= Widemouth =

Widemouth may refer to:

- Widemouth, West Virginia, a community in Mercer County
- Widemouth Bay, in Cornwall, England
- Widemouth Creek, a stream in West Virginia
