= TAT-6 =

Transatlantic telephone cable

TAT-6 was the sixth transatlantic telephone cable. It was in operation from 1976 to 1994, with a bandwidth of 12 MHz (4,000 telephone circuits) between Green Hill (United States) and Saint-Hilaire-de-Riez, Vendée, (France).

Known as the SG coaxial cable system, designed by Bell Labs, the cable is 3,396 nautical miles (6,300 km) with repeater spacing of 5.1 nautical miles (9 km). The deep sea portion, some 3,000 nautical miles (5,600 km) in length, was laid by the Cable Ship Long Lines, owned by AT&T. Portions of the shore sections were laid by the French Cable Ship Vercors.

The SG Undersea Cable System was designed by Bell Laboratories at their Allentown, PA, Greensboro, NC, Holmdel, NJ, and Whippany, NJ facilities.

A few years later, TAT-7 was put into service between Tuckerton, New Jersey, and Lands End, England, and was the last analog Transatlantic undersea system.

The following system, TAT-8, was implemented by AT&T Corp. (with Bell Laboratories), STC (with British Telecom), and Alcatel (with France Telecom). This was the first Transatlantic fiber-optic system, had greatly increased capacity and performance.
