= HMS Squirrel (1904) =

Royal Navy's coast guard vessel

History

United Kingdom
- Name: HMS Squirrel
- Builder: Workman, Clark & Co Ltd
- Launched: 21 December 1904
- Commissioned: 1905
- Fate: Sold, 16 November 1921 and renamed Vedra

General characteristics
- Displacement: 230 long tons (260 short tons)
- Length: 103 ft (31 m)
- Beam: 21 ft (6.4 m)
- Propulsion: 300 ihp steam engine
- Speed: 10 knots
- Armament: 2 × 3 pdr guns

HMS Squirrel was built for the Royal Navy as a coast guard vessel, commissioned in 1905 to replace the previous HMS Squirrel. She was built at Belfast by Workman, Clark and Company as yard number 215, launched on 21 December 1904 and completed early in 1905. The displacement of Squirrel was 230 t (250 short tons), her dimensions 103 ft (31 m) length overall and 21 ft (6.4 m) beam, and she was fitted with a 300 ihp steam engine giving her a speed of 10 knots. She was armed with two 3-pounder guns.

From 1905 to 1912 Squirrel was nominally tender for HMS President and possibly HMS Halcyon, and in October 1906 she was recorded as being under the command of Chief Officer C H Coleman. From 1914 to 1917 she was a tender to HMS Vivid, and in February 1914 she was under the command of Chief Officer James B Newman. The coastguard role continued until 1917, when she became a cable vessel.

Surplus to requirements, Squirrel was sold on 16 November 1921 to the Sunderland Pilotage Authority for conversion to the pilot tender Vedra. Registered in 1923 at Sunderland with Official Number 146924, she was measured as 158 GRT and 52 NRT. In the mid-1930s several attempts were made to sell Vedra, and in 1936 Thomas Young & Sons (Shipbreakers) Ltd purchased her for local demolition. However, she was resold to Captain Vernon Sewell for use during the making of the Michael Powell film The Edge of the World in Scotland during 1937. Thereafter Vedra was sold to foreign owners and renamed, but again became a British ship in 1938 as the yacht Sea-Serpent, registered at Famagusta, Cyprus, then a British colony. Sea-Serpent was reported sunk on 22 April 1941 by German aircraft between Syros and Souda.
