= CANTAT-1 =

CANTAT-1 was the first Canadian transatlantic telephone cable, between Hampden, Newfoundland and eventually Grosses-Roches, Quebec and Oban, United Kingdom, which followed on from the success of TAT-1. It was conceived and approved as stage one of a proposed commonwealth round the world cable and was done at a cost of $8,500,000. The system was jointly owned by Cable & Wireless and the Canadian Overseas Telecommunication Corporation (COTC).

The system, involving the first commercial use of a new lightweight deep sea cable with a weight in water of about one-fifth that of armored deep sea cable, was laid in two phases. The first, CANTAT A, was the 2,072 nmi (2,384 mi; 3,837 km) ocean section laid by HMTS Monarch with the U.K. shore end laid by HMTS Ariel (Note: Built 1939 by Swan, Hunter and Wigham Richardson Ltd.) and the Canadian end laid by the U.S. Army CS Albert J. Myer. The second phase, linked by overland cable from Hampden to Corner Brook, Newfoundland, was the 400 nmi (460 mi; 740 km) segment laid by HMTS CS Alert (Note: Fourth Alert, built in 1961 by Fairfield Ship Building & Engineering.) with both shore ends laid by CS Hadsund.

The new Trans Atlantic cables, TAT-1, CANTAT-1 and TAT-2, with their high capacity brought about a major change in regulations, with specific changes in the U.S. Federal Communications Commission policies regarding lease of foreign cable channels by U.S. international record carriers. (Note: Companies had been divided by the Communications Act of 1934 according to the technology used.) CANTAT-1 operated from 1961 to 1986, initially carrying 60 telephone circuits, later modified from 4 kHz channels to 3 kHz channels, expanding capacity to 80 telephone circuits.
