= Youlan-class cable layer =

Ship class

History

PRC
- Commissioned: 2015 onward
- Status: Active

General characteristics
- Class & type: Youlan class
- Type: Cable layer
- Displacement: 5,000 long tons (5,100 t)
- Length: 97 m (318 ft 3 in)
- Propulsion: Marine Diesel
- Sensors & processing systems: Navigation radar
- Electronic warfare & decoys: None
- Armament: None
- Armour: None
- Aircraft carried: None
- Aviation facilities: None

Youlan-class cable layer is a class of little-known cable layer built in the People’s Republic of China (PRC) for the People's Liberation Army Navy (PLAN), and it has received the NATO reporting name Youlan (邮缆 in Chinese), meaning Postal Cable.

Contrary to the usual layout of Chinese cable layers built earlier of bow sheaves design, Dong-Lan 885 class cable layers adopt a modern stern sheaves design. The superstructure consists of three levels of decks, with the first deck for enlisted quarters, clinics, conference rooms, and control rooms for cable-laying machinery. The second deck is for officers’ quarters, while the third deck is for the bridge, where navigation, control, and communication consoles are located. Dong-Lan 885-class cable layer is equipped with radars, sonars, radios, buoys, tension machines, and various other devices to enable it lay and repair both power cable and communication cable, including fiber optic cable. A total of 2 units were identified by the end of 2021: Dong-Lan 885 was the first ship of this class, and the second ship of this class was PLANS Nan-Lan 233, which replaced the retired Type 991 cable layer unit of the same pennant number/name.

Youlan class in PLAN service is designated by a combination of two Chinese characters followed by a three-digit number, with the second Chinese character being Lan(缆), meaning cable (for communication & power) in Chinese. The first Chinese character denotes which fleet the ship is serviced with, with East (Dong, 东) for East Sea Fleet (ESF), North (Bei, 北) for North Sea Fleet (NSF), and South (Nan, 南) for South Sea Fleet (SSF). However, the pennant numbers are subject to change due to changes in Chinese naval ships naming convention, or when units are transferred to different fleets. Specification:

- Length: 97 meter

Type	NATO designation	Pennant No.	Name (English)	Name (Han 汉)	Commissioned	Displacement	Fleet	Status
Unknown type of cable layer (ARC)	Youlan class	Dong-Lan 885	East Cable 885	东缆 885	January 30, 2015	5000 t	East Sea Fleet	Active
Unknown type of cable layer (ARC)	Youlan class	Nan-Lan 233	South Cable 233	南缆 233	2017	5000 t	South Sea Fleet	Active
