= Widemouth Bay =

Village and beach in Cornwall, England

Coordinates: 50.790°N 4.555°W

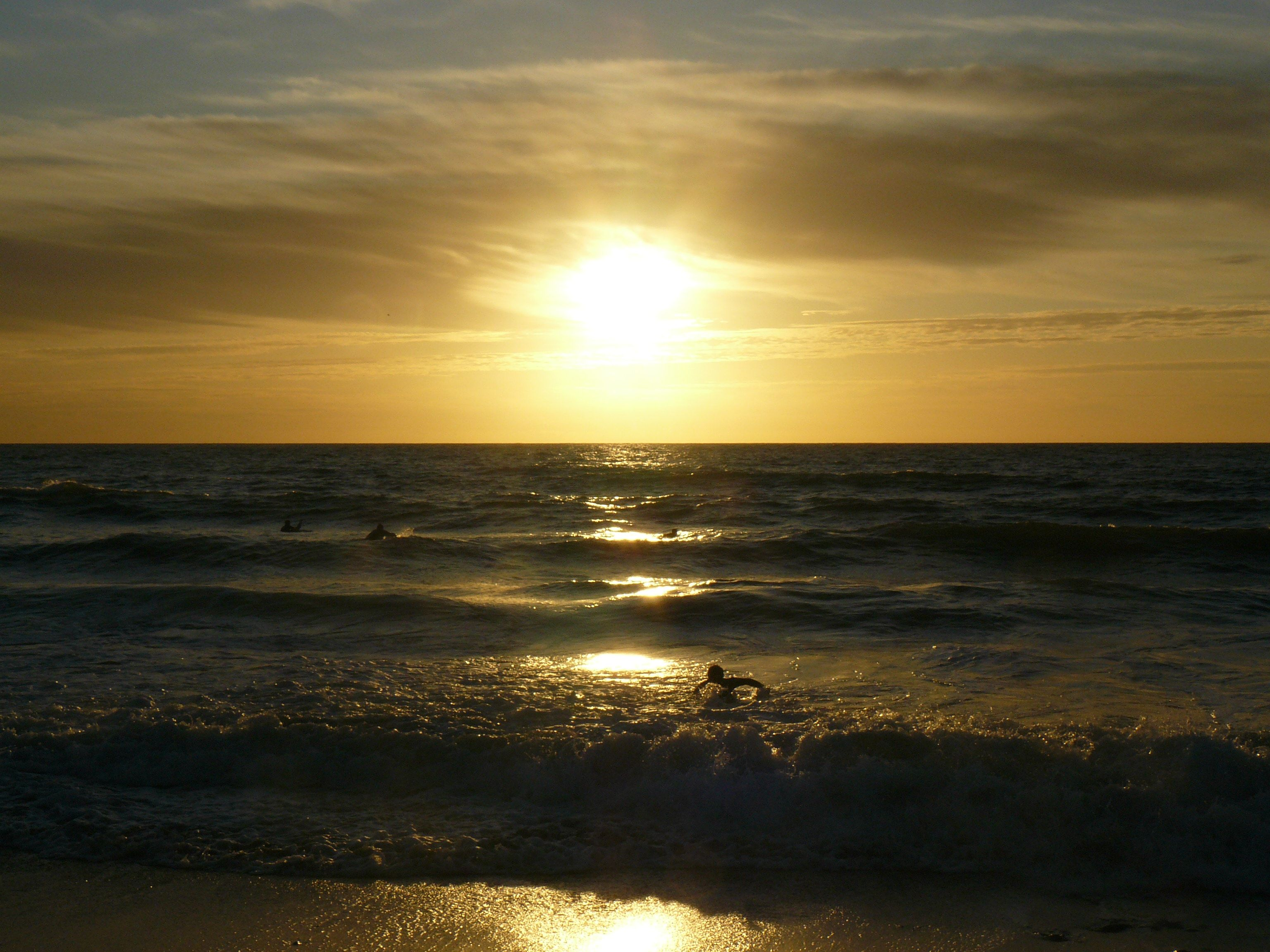
Widemouth Bay in the summer

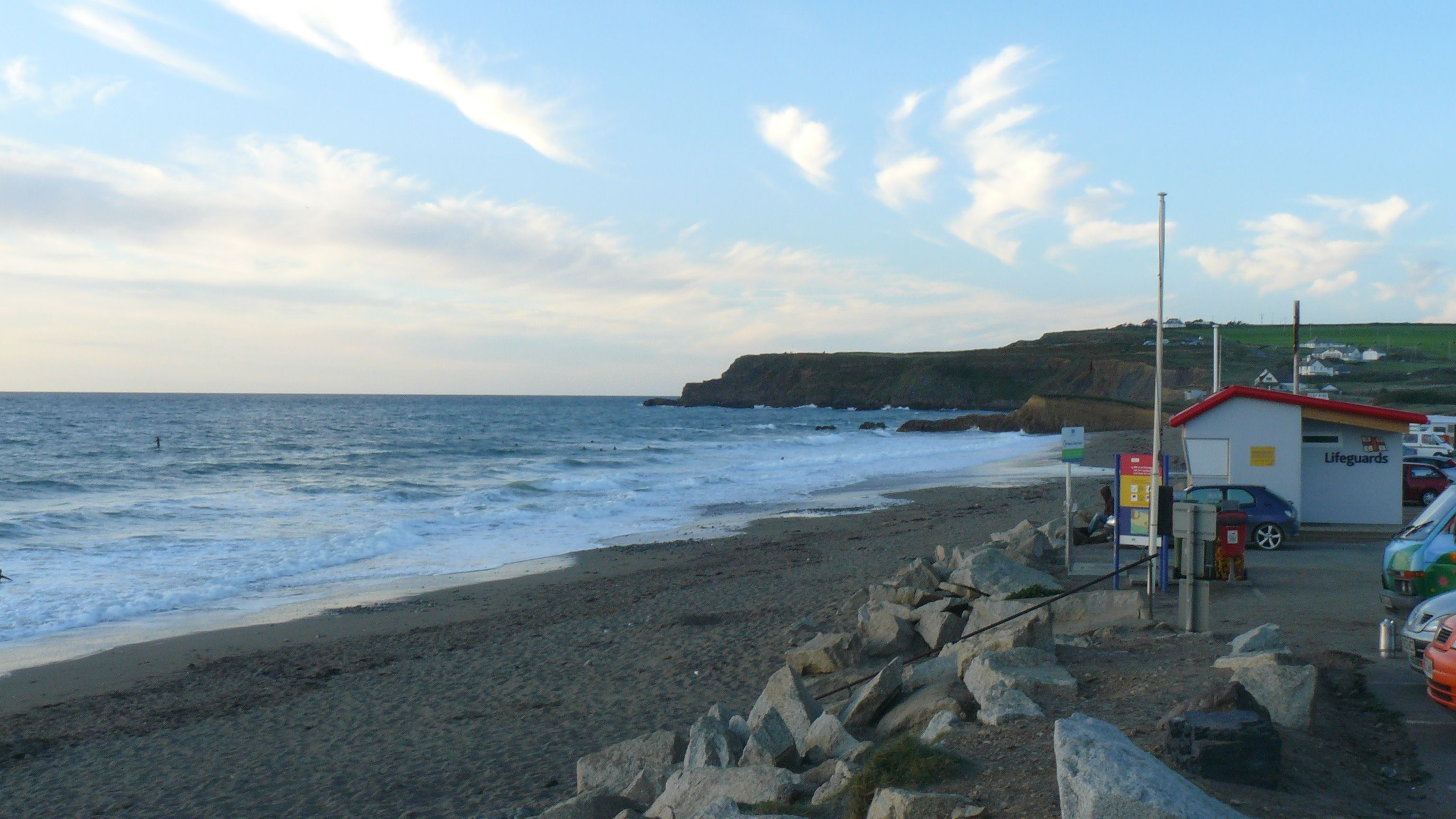
Facing north

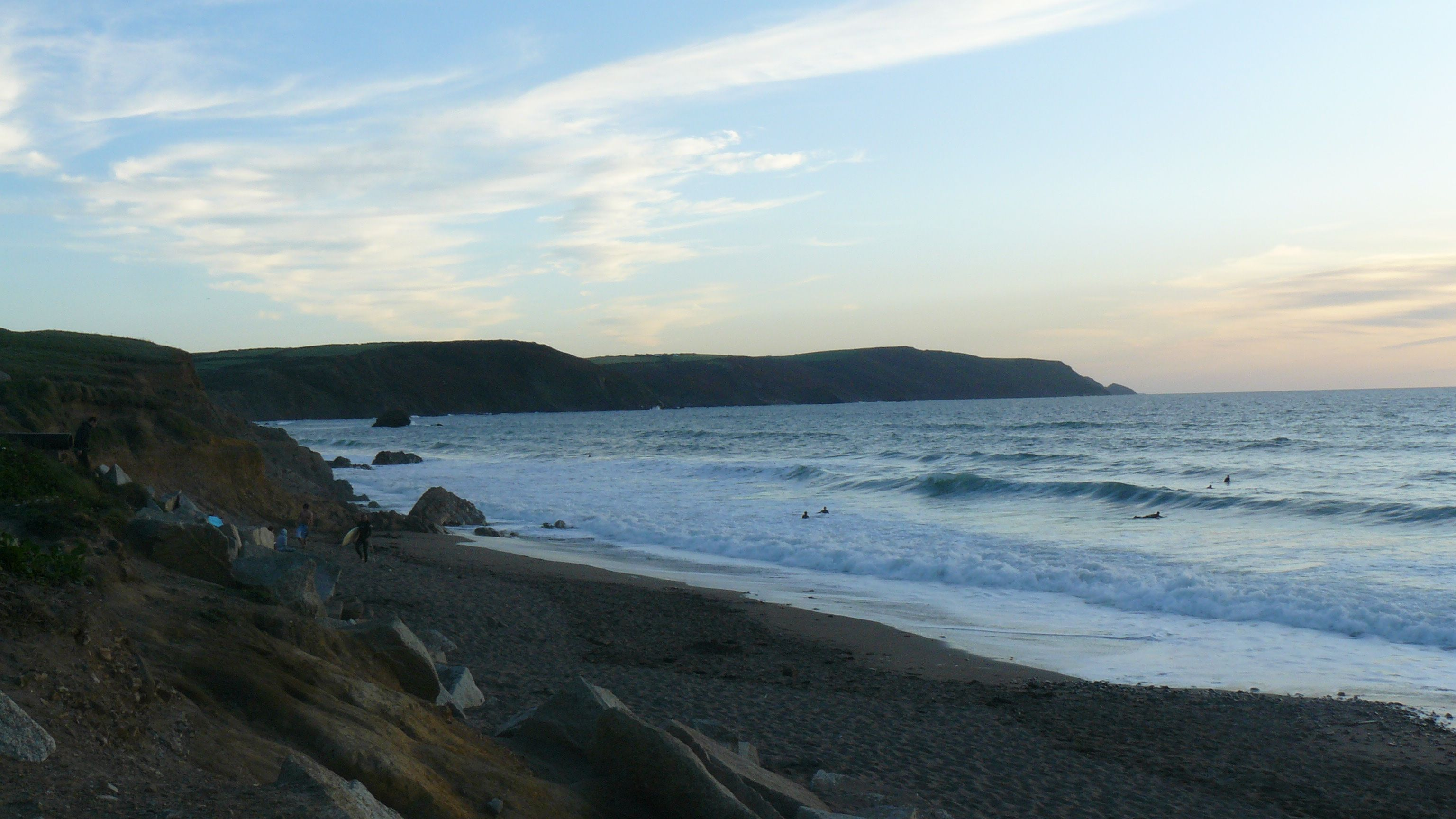
Facing south

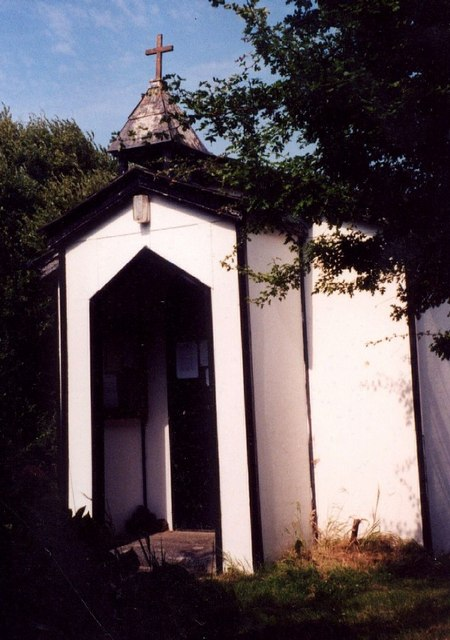
The Church of Our Lady and St Anne (Church of England)

Widemouth Bay (Cornish: Porth an Men (bay) meaning bay of the stone, Cornish: Aswaledan (village) meaning broad gap) is a bay, beach and small village on the Atlantic coast of Cornwall, England, United Kingdom. It is about 3 miles (5 km) south of Bude. This stretch of coast is steeped in smuggling history from previous centuries, and not far south of Widemouth Bay can be found many little inlets and coves.

== Village ==
The village of Widemouth Bay itself is a much more recent development, consisting mainly of bungalows built during the twentieth century. As well as a number of hotels, there are several cafes on and around the beach as well as a pub and shops on the hill above the bay. Widemouth Bay has a small church, Our Lady and St Anne's, located on the landward side of the village.

== Activities ==
The beach is popular for surfing and swimming and is patrolled in the summer by RNLI lifeguards. Several surfing schools operate on the beach because it has relatively gentle, easy to ride waves but on the other hand there can be big waves.

The area is also very popular for tourists, and a number of holiday parks and campsites operate in the area.

== Geography ==
Widemouth Bay is visually very similar to Southerndown and Ogmore-by-Sea across the Bristol Channel in Wales; it has the same (gently sloping) hill-top location; wide, sandy beach; pounding Atlantic surf; and significantly the same carboniferous sandstone cliffs. Another significant connection is that sloops from Wales would use Widemouth as a port (in the most basic sense), unloading coal and limestone; sloops would take back to Wales Cornish wares such as granite, slate, tin, copper and even Cornish pasties.

== Telecommunications ==
=== Submarine communications cables ===
The gentle beaches in the bay are also the landing points for many submarine cables that link the UK with other parts of the world. The proximity to the GCHQ Bude installation allows data sent on these cables to be intercepted by GCHQ. These cables include:

- TAT-3 (USA and UK)
- CANTAT-1 (Canada and UK)
- Apollo (USA)
- TAT-8 (USA and France - last used in 2002)
- TAT-14 (USA and Europe)
- AC-2 (USA)
- EIG (Europe India Gateway)
- GLO-1 (UK and west Africa)
- Grace Hopper (USA, UK and Spain - due to go live 2022)

=== Repeater station ===
The repeater station is a cable landing station. Construction was begun in 1962 and finished during 1963. The building was specifically constructed to withstand nuclear attack, having numerous specialised features including an air filtration system, five-ton blast doors, and backup power supply systems allowing it to operate as an autonomous building. The majority of the building is constructed below ground, as is common with many blast-resistant bunkers.
