= Transatlantic communications cable =

Communications cable across the Atlantic

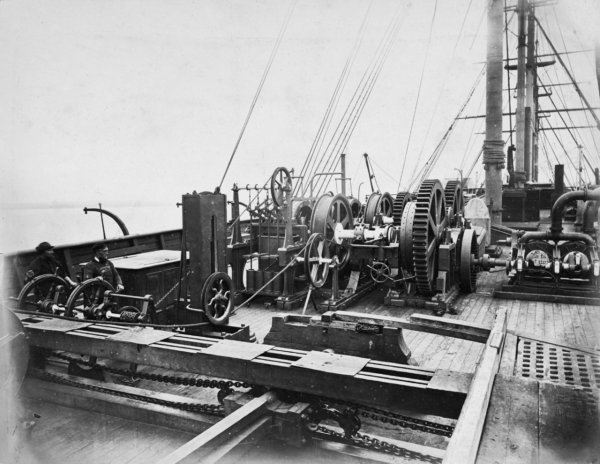
Cable laying in the 1860s

A transatlantic telecommunications cable is a submarine communications cable connecting one side of the Atlantic Ocean to the other. In the 19th and early 20th centuries, each cable was a single wire. After mid-century, coaxial cable came into use, with amplifiers. Late in the 20th century, all cables installed use optical fiber as well as optical amplifiers, because distances range thousands of kilometers.

== History ==
When the first transatlantic telegraph cable was laid in 1858 by Cyrus West Field, it operated for only three weeks; a subsequent attempt in 1866 was more successful. On July 13, 1866 the cable laying ship Great Eastern sailed out of Valentia Island, Ireland and on July 27 landed at Heart's Content in Newfoundland, completing the first lasting connection across the Atlantic. It was active until 1965.

Although a telephone cable was discussed starting in the 1920s, to be practical it needed a number of technological advances which did not arrive until the 1940s. Starting in 1927, transatlantic telephone service was radio-based.

TAT-1 (Transatlantic No. 1) was the first transatlantic telephone cable system. It was laid between Gallanach Bay, near Oban, and Clarenville, Newfoundland between 1955 and 1956 by the cable ship Monarch. It was inaugurated on September 25, 1956, initially carrying 36 telephone channels. In the first 24 hours of public service, there were 588 London–U.S. calls and 119 from London to Canada. The capacity of the cable was soon increased to 48 channels. Later, an additional three channels were added by use of C Carrier equipment. Time-assignment speech interpolation (TASI) was implemented on the TAT-1 cable in June 1960 and effectively increased the cable's capacity from 37 (out of 51 available channels) to 72 speech circuits. TAT-1 was finally retired in 1978. Later coaxial cables, installed through the 1970s, used transistors and had higher bandwidth. The Moscow–Washington hotline was initially connected through this system.

== Current technology ==
All cables presently in service use fiber optic technology. Many cables terminate in Newfoundland and Ireland, which lie on the great circle route from London, UK to New York City, US.

There has been a succession of newer transatlantic cable systems. All recent systems have used fiber optic transmission, and a self-healing ring topology. Late in the 20th century, communications satellites lost most of their North Atlantic telephone traffic to these low-cost, high-capacity, low-latency cables. This advantage only increases over time, as tighter cables provide higher bandwidth – the 2012 generation of cables drop the transatlantic latency to under 60 milliseconds, according to Hibernia Atlantic, deploying such a cable that year.

Some new cables are being announced on the South Atlantic: SACS (South Atlantic Cable System) and SAex (South Atlantic Express).

== TAT cable routes ==
The TAT series of cables constitute a large percentage of all North Atlantic cables. All TAT cables are joint ventures between a number of telecommunications companies, e.g. British Telecom. CANTAT cables terminate in Canada rather than in the US.

| Name | In service | Type | Initial channels | Final channels | Western end | Eastern end |
|---|---|---|---|---|---|---|
| TAT-1 | 1956–1978 | Galvanic | 36 | 51 | Newfoundland | Scotland |
| TAT-2 | 1959–1982 | Galvanic | 48 | 72 | Newfoundland | France |
| TAT-3 | 1963–1986 | Galvanic | 138 | 276 | New Jersey | England |
| TAT-4 | 1965–1987 | Galvanic | 138 | 345 | New Jersey | France |
| TAT-5 | 1970–1993 | Galvanic | 845 | 2,112 | Rhode Island | Spain |
| TAT-6 | 1976–1994 | Galvanic | 4,000 | 10,000 | Rhode Island | France |
| TAT-7 | 1978–1994 | Galvanic | 4,000 | 10,500 | New Jersey | England |
| TAT-8 | 1988–2002 | Fiber-optic | 40,000 | – | New Jersey | England, France |
| TAT-9 | 1992–2004 | Fiber-optic | 80,000 | – | New Jersey, Nova Scotia | Spain, France, England |
| TAT-10 | 1992–2003 | Fiber-optic | 2 × 565 Mbit/s | – | US | Germany, Netherlands |
| TAT-11 | 1993–2003 | Fiber-optic | 2 × 565 Mbit/s | – | New Jersey | France |
| TAT-12/13 | 1996–2008 | Fiber-optic | 12 × 2.5 Gbit/s | – | US × 2 | England, France |
| TAT-14 | 2001–2020 | Fiber-optic | 3.2 Tbit/s | – | New Jersey × 2 | England, France, Netherlands, Germany, Denmark |
| CANTAT-1 | 1961–1986 | Galvanic | 80 | – | Newfoundland | Scotland |
| CANTAT-2 | 1974–1992 | Galvanic | 1,840 | – | Nova Scotia | England |
| CANTAT-3 | 1994–2010 | Fiber-optic | 2 × 2.5 Gbit/s | | Nova Scotia | Iceland, Faroe Islands, England, Denmark, Germany |
| PTAT-1 | 1989–2004 | Fiber-optic | 3 × 140 Mbit/s? | | New Jersey & Bermuda | Ireland & England |

== Private cable routes ==
There are a number of private non-TAT cables.

| Cable name | Ready for service | Cable length (km) | Nominal capacity | Latency (ms) | Landing points | Owner |
|---|---|---|---|---|---|---|
| Gemini (decommissioned) | May 1998 | | | under 100 ms | north: Charlestown, US-RI; Oxwich Bay, GB-WLS; south: Manasquan, US-NJ; Porthcurno, GB-ENG | Vodafone (originally Cable & Wireless) |
| AC-1 | May 1998 | 14,301 km | 120 Gbit/s | 65 ms | Brookhaven, US-NY; Whitesands Bay, GB-ENG; Beverwijk, NL-NH; Sylt, DE-SH | Lumen Technologies (originally Global Crossing) |
| Columbus III (decommissioned) | December 1999 | 9,833 km | | | Hollywood, US-FL; Ponta Delgada (Azores), PT; Carcavelos, PT; Conil de la Frontera, ES-AN; Mazara del Vallo (Sicily), IT | various telecom operators |
| Yellow/AC-2 | September 2000 | 7,001 km | 640 Gbit/s | under 100 ms | Bellport, US-NY; Bude, GB-ENG | Lumen Technologies |
| Hibernia Atlantic | April 2001 | 12,200 km | 320 Gbit/s, upgraded to 10.16 Tbit/s | 59 ms | Lynn, US-MA; Herring Cove, CA-NS; Dublin, IE-L; Southport, GB-ENG; Coleraine, GB-NIR | GTT Communications, Inc. (originally Hibernia Networks) |
| FLAG Atlantic | June 2001 | 14,500 km | | under 100 ms | Island Park, US-NY; Plerin, FR-BRE; Skewjack, GB-ENG; Northport, US-NY | Global Cloud Xchange (Reliance Communications) |
| Tata TGN-Atlantic | June 2001 | 13,000 km | 5.1 Tbit/s | under 100 ms | Wall Township, US-NJ; Highbridge, GB-ENG | Sold by Tyco to Tata Communications in 2005 |
| Apollo | February 2003 | 13,000 km | 3.2 Tbit/s | under 100 ms | Manasquan, New Jersey, US-NJ; Lannion, FR-BRE; Bude, GB-ENG; Shirley, US-NY | Vodafone (originally Cable & Wireless) |
| Greenland Connect | March 2009 | 4,780 km | | | Milton, CA-NL; Aasiaat, GL-QA; Sisimiut, GL-QE; Maniitsoq, GL-QE; Nuuk, GL-SM; Qaqortoq, GL-KU; Landeyjar, IS | TELE Greenland |
| Hibernia Express | September 2015 | 4,600 km | | | Halifax, CA-NS; Cork, IE-M; Brean, GB-ENG | GTT Communications, Inc. (originally Hibernia Networks) |
| AEConnect (AEC-1) | January 2016 | 5,522 km | 4 × 10 Tbit/s (four strand 100 × 100 Gbit/s) | 54 ms | Shirley, US-NY; Killala, IE-C | Aqua Comms |
| MAREA | February 2018 | 6,600 km | 160 Tbit/s | | Virginia Beach, US-VA; Bilbao, ES-PV | Facebook (25 %), Microsoft (25 %), Telefónica (50 %) |
| Midgardsormen (cancelled) | Q2 2019 (planned) | 7,848 km | | | Virginia Beach, US-VA; Blaabjerg, DK; Mo i Rana, NO | Midgardsormen |
| Dunant | September 2020 (live) | 6,400km | 250 Tbit/s | | Virginia Beach, US-VA; Saint-Hilaire-de-Riez, FR | Google |
| Havfrue, including America Europe Connect-2 (AEC-2) branch | December 2020 | 7,851km | 108 Tbit/s | | New Jersey, US; Dublin, RoI; London, UK; Amsterdam, NL; Blaabjerg, DK; Kristiansand, NO | AquaCommms, Bulk Infrastructure, Facebook and Google |
| Grace Hopper | September 2022 | 6,000km | 352 Tbit/s | | New York, US; Bude, UK; Bilbao, Spain | Google |
| Amitié | July 2023 | 6,600km | 320 Tbit/s | | Lynn, Massachusetts, US; Bude, UK; Le Porge, France | A consortium comprising Facebook, Microsoft, Aqua Comms, Vodafone (through Cable & Wireless Americas Systems), Orange |

== South Atlantic cable routes ==
| Cable name | Ready for service | Length | Landing points | Owner |
|---|---|---|---|---|
| Atlantis-2 | February 2000 | 8,500 km | Carcavelos, PT; El Médano, ES-CN; Praia, CV; Dakar, SN; Fortaleza, BR-CE; Las Toninas, AR-B | various telecom operators |
| EllaLink | Q2 2021 | 5,900 km | Sines, PT; Fortaleza, BR-CE; Santos, BR-SP | Telebras, IslaLink |
| SACS | Q3 2018 | 6,165 km | Fortaleza, BR-CE; Luanda, AO | Angola Cables |
| SAIL | Q4 2018 | 5,900 km | Fortaleza, BR-CE; Kribi, CM | Camtel, China Unicom |

== See also ==
- Cable layer
- List of international submarine communications cables
