= TAT2 =

TAT2 could refer to:

- TAT2 neutraceutical - see cycloastragenol
- TAT-2, a transatlantic communications cable.
