= Transatlantic cable =

Transatlantic cable may refer to:

- Transatlantic telegraph cable
- Transatlantic communications cable
- Other transatlantic submarine communications cable
