= TAT-3 =

Transatlantic telephone cable

TAT-3 was the third transatlantic telephone cable, in operation from 1963 to 1986. It had 414 kHz of bandwidth, allowing it to carry 138 telephone circuits (simultaneous calls). It was 3,518 nautical miles (6,515 km; 4,048 mi) long, connecting Widemouth Bay in Cornwall, England to Tuckerton, New Jersey in the United States. It was owned by AT&T and GPO (now BT). It cost £12m in 1960 equivalent to £349,030,172 in 2023.
