= HAW-1 =

Submarine telephone cable

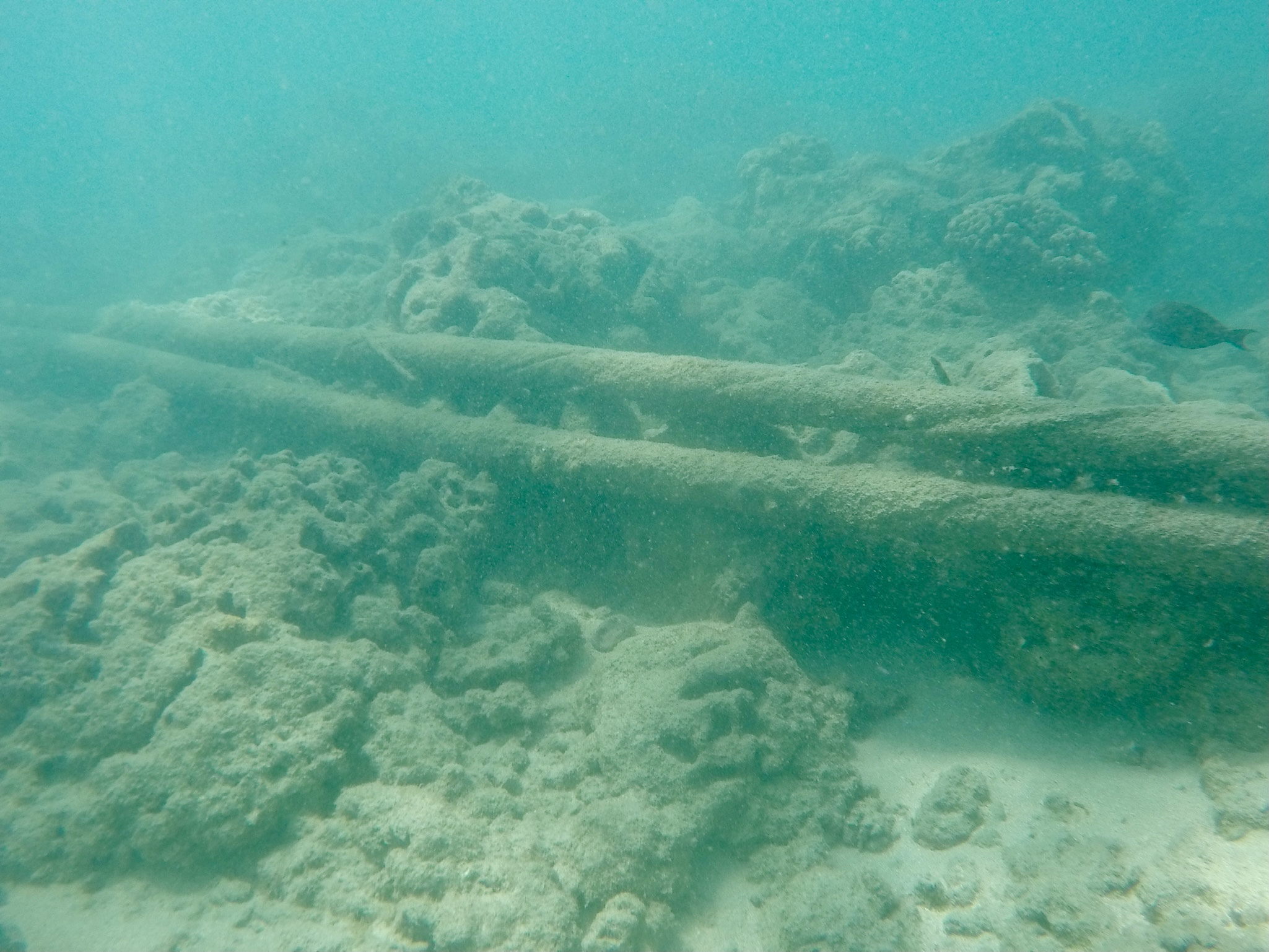
HAW-1 cable pairs seen underwater in Hanauma Bay Nature Preserve, Oahu in June 2021. Degradation of the cable armor is visible.

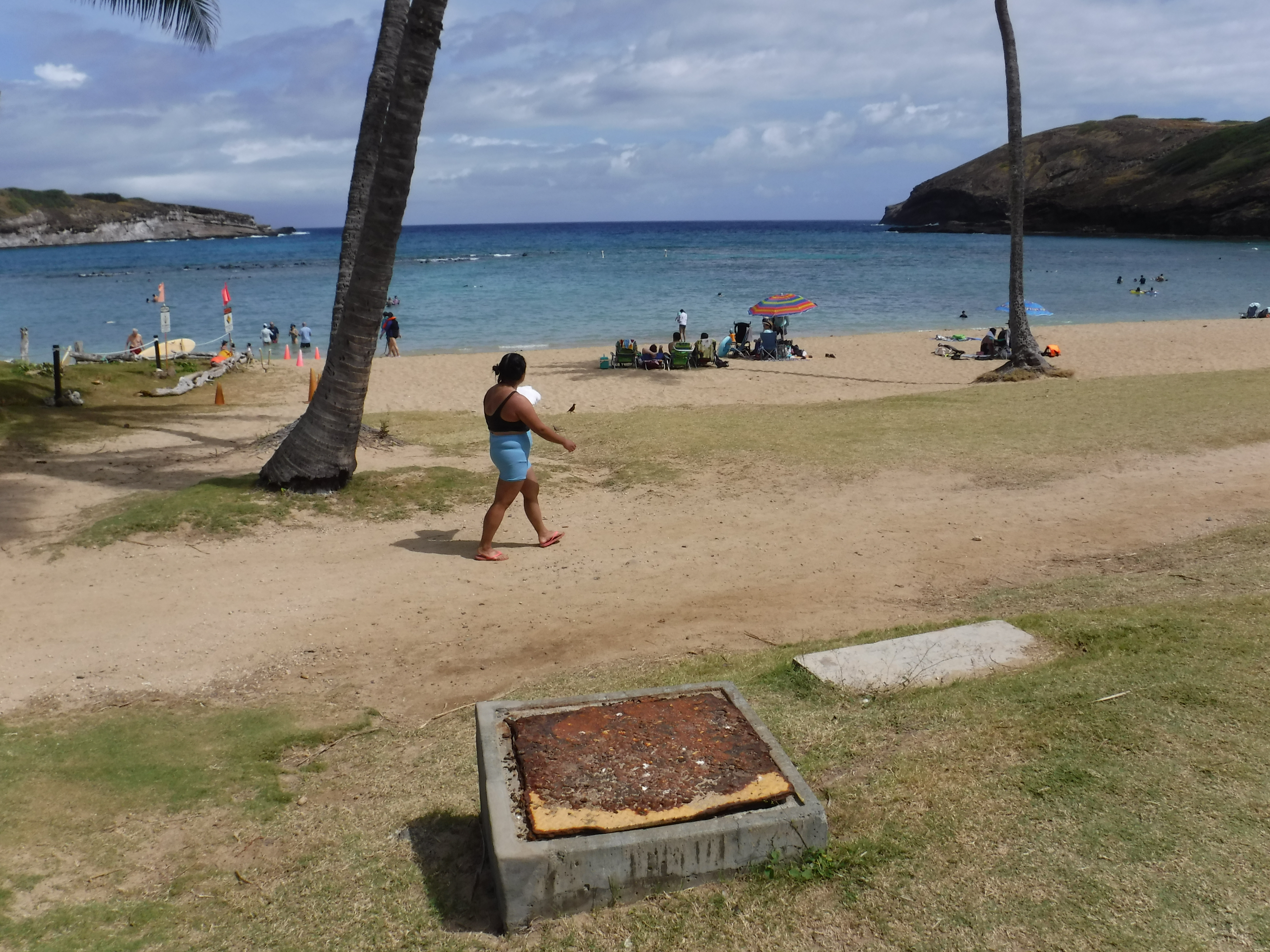
Hanauma Bay presumed beach vaults, March 2022.

HAW-1 (Hawaii No. 1) was the first submarine telephone cable laid between Hawaii and the mainland United States. HAW-1 was laid in 1957, and consisted of two cables, each transmitting in one direction over 36 channels, with an individual length of 2,625 Nmi (4,862 km). The cable spans between Hanauma Bay, Oahu, Hawaii and Point Arena, California.

== History ==
After Operator Toll Dialing commenced service between San Francisco and Hawaii on June 15, 1950, a plan for an undersea cable route between these points was announced on August 10, 1955.

Manufactured by Submarine Cables Ltd. (2,030 nm) and Simplex Wire & Cable Co. (2,380 nm), the cable was commissioned by the Long Lines division of AT&T and the Hawaiian Telephone Company.

The cableship HMTS Monarch commenced laying the cable from Point Arena (San Francisco) on July 15, 1957, and after laying 1900 miles met in mid-ocean with CS Ocean Layer, which put down the remaining 665 miles of cable into Hanauma Bay on Oahu. The Pacific Telephone Company constructed a radio-relay link over a distance of 125 miles to connect the cable with the national telephone network at Oakland, CA.

The first message through the cable was sent on 3 August 1957, and the ships then laid the eastbound cable, completing the installation. On October 8, 1957, the cable opened to public service.

In 1964, the HAW-1 cable formed the last leg of a transpacific cable route from Japan to the United States, but shared traffic with a new cable from Makaha, Oahu, to San Luis Obisbo.

== Cable ==
The cable used for HAW-1 was of the same type as used for TAT-1, the first telephone cable across the Atlantic Ocean, which had been laid the previous year, and also for the 1956 USA to Alaska telephone cable. At that time, the repeaters worked in only one direction, therefore two cables were needed for each route. The Hawaii No. 1 cable provided the first direct operator dialing between Hawaii and the mainland and was retired in 1989 after 32 years of service, then being replaced with more advanced fiber-optic cable technology.
