= TAT-4 =

Transatlantic telephone cable

TAT-4 was the fourth transatlantic telephone cable, in operation from 1965 to 1987. It operated at 384 kHz, initially carrying 128 telephone circuits between Saint-Hilaire-de-Riez, (France) and Tuckerton, New Jersey (United States). It was co-owned by AT&T and France Telecom.
