= Cable layer =

Ship for laying undersea cables

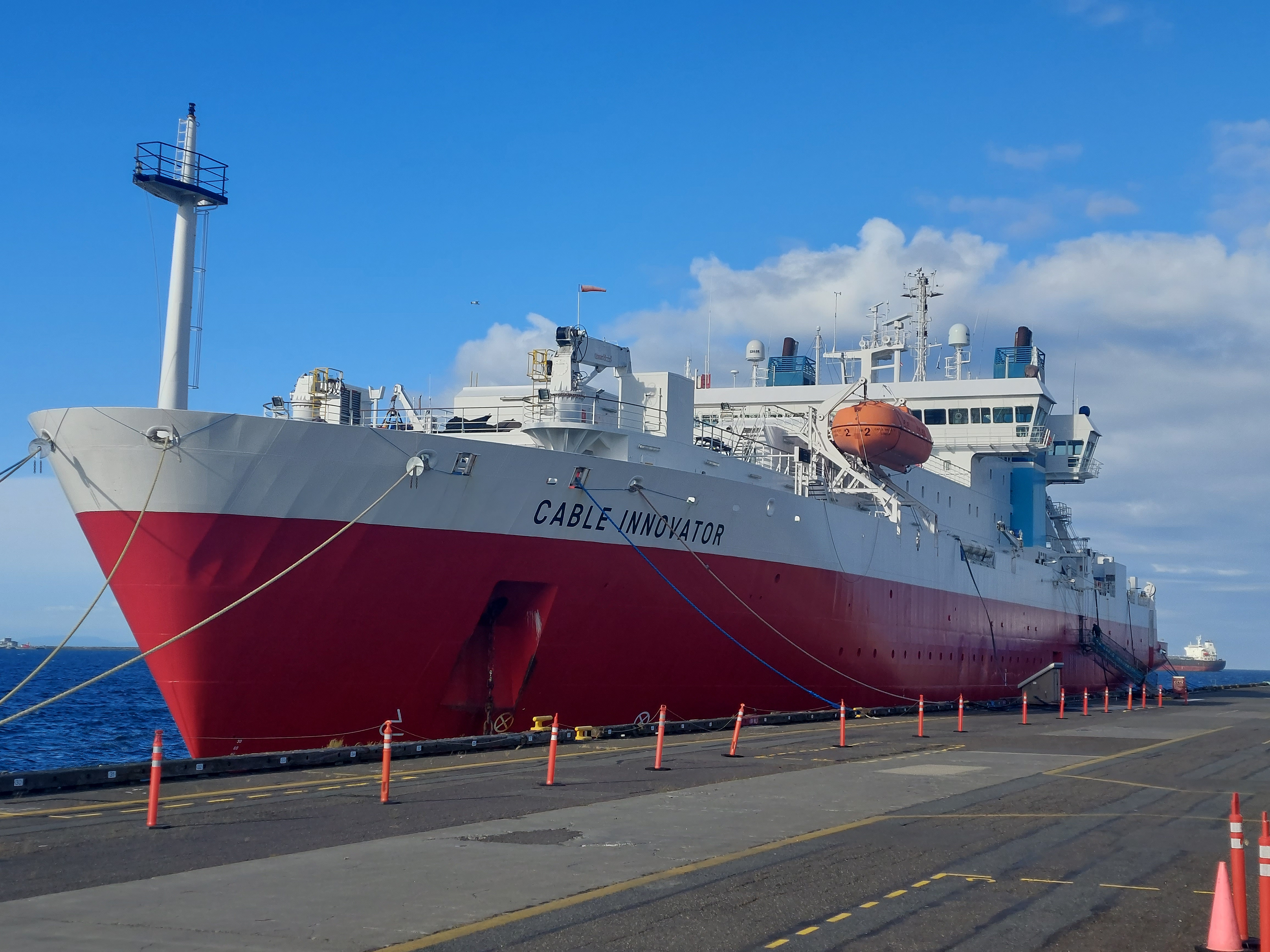
Modern cable layer CS Cable Innovator docked in Port Angeles, Washington

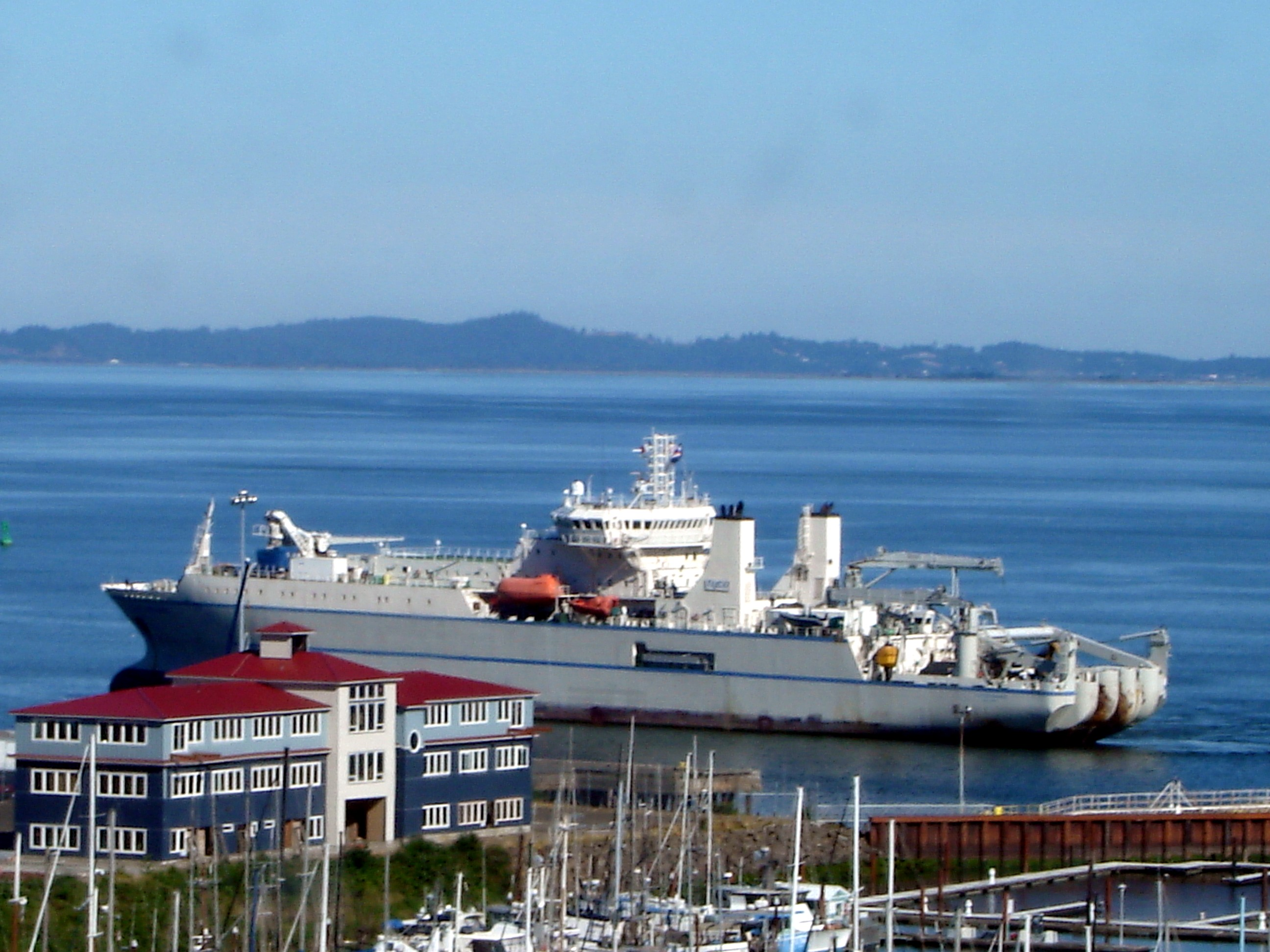
CS Dependable at Astoria, Oregon, a modern stern sheave design

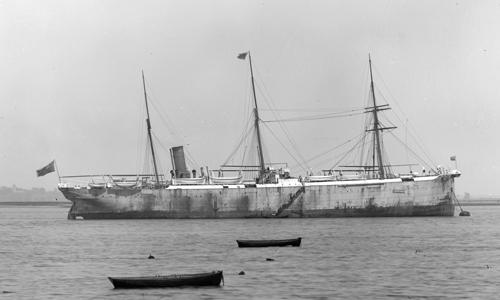
CS Hooper, the world's first purpose-built cable-laying ship, built by C. Mitchell & Co of Newcastle-upon-Tyne in 1873, renamed CS Silvertown in 1881

A cable layer or cable ship is a deep-sea vessel designed and used to lay underwater cables for telecommunications, for electric power transmission, military, or other purposes. Cable ships are distinguished by large cable sheaves for guiding cable over bow or stern or both. Bow sheaves, some very large, were characteristic of all cable ships in the past, but newer ships are tending toward having stern sheaves only, as seen in the photo of CS Cable Innovator at the Port of Astoria on this page. The names of cable ships are often preceded by "C.S." as in CS Long Lines.

The first transatlantic telegraph cable was laid by cable layers in 1857 to 1858. It briefly enabled telecommunication between Europe and North America before misuse resulted in failure of the line. In 1866 the SS Great Eastern successfully laid two transatlantic cables, securing future communication between the continents.

== Modern cable ships ==
Cable ships have unique requirements related to having long idle periods in port between cable laying or repairs, operation at low speeds or stopped at sea during cable operations, long periods running astern (less frequent as stern layers are now common), high maneuverability, and a fair speed to reach operation areas.

Modern cable ships differ greatly from their predecessors. There are two main types of cable ships: cable repair ships and cable-laying ships. Cable repair ships, like the Japanese Tsugaru Maru, tend to be smaller and more maneuverable; they are capable of laying cable, but their primary job is fixing or repairing broken sections of cable. A cable-laying ship, like CS Long Lines, is designed to lay new cables. Such ships are bigger than repair ships and less maneuverable; their cable storage drums are also larger and are set in parallel so one drum can feed into another, allowing them to lay cable much faster. These ships are also generally equipped with a linear cable engine (LCE) that helps them lay cable quickly. By locating the manufacturing plant near a harbor, cable can be loaded into the ship's hold as it is being manufactured.

The newest design of cable layers, though, is a combination of cable-laying and repair ships. An example is USNS Zeus (T-ARC-7) the only U.S. naval cable layer-repair ship. Zeus uses two diesel-electric engines that produce 5,000 horsepower (3,700 kW) each and can carry her up to 15 knots (28 km/h; 17 mph). She can lay about 1,000 miles (1,600 km) of telecommunications cable to a depth of 9,000 feet (2,700 m). The purpose of Zeus was to be a cable ship that could do anything required of it, so the ship was built to be able to lay and retrieve cable from either the bow or the stern with ease. This design was similar to that of the first cable ship, Great Eastern. Zeus was built to be as maneuverable as possible so that it could fulfill both roles: as a cable layer or a cable repair ship.

== Equipment ==
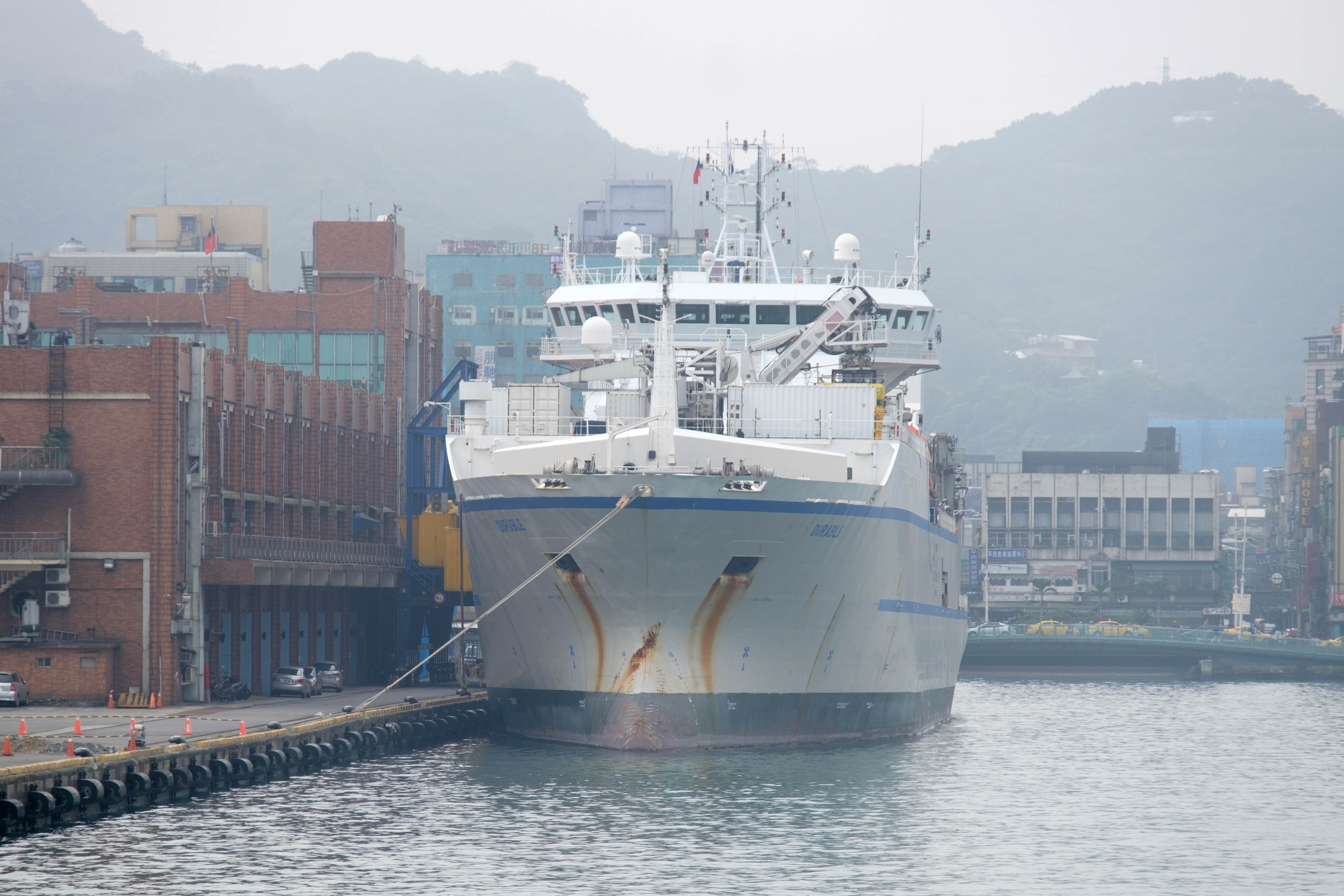
CS Durable was operated by TE Subcom, docked at Keelung port in 2015. This reliance-class ship without bow sheaves.

To ensure that cable is laid and retrieved properly, specially designed equipment must be used. Different equipment is used on cable-laying ships depending on what their job requires. In order to retrieve damaged or mislaid cable, a grapple system is used to gather cable from the ocean floor. There are several types of grapples, each with certain advantages or disadvantages. These grapples are attached to the vessel via a grapple rope, originally a mix of steel and manila lines, but now made from synthetic materials. This ensures that the line is strong, yet can flex and strain under the weight of the grapple. The line is pulled up by reversing the Linear Cable Engine used to lay the cable.

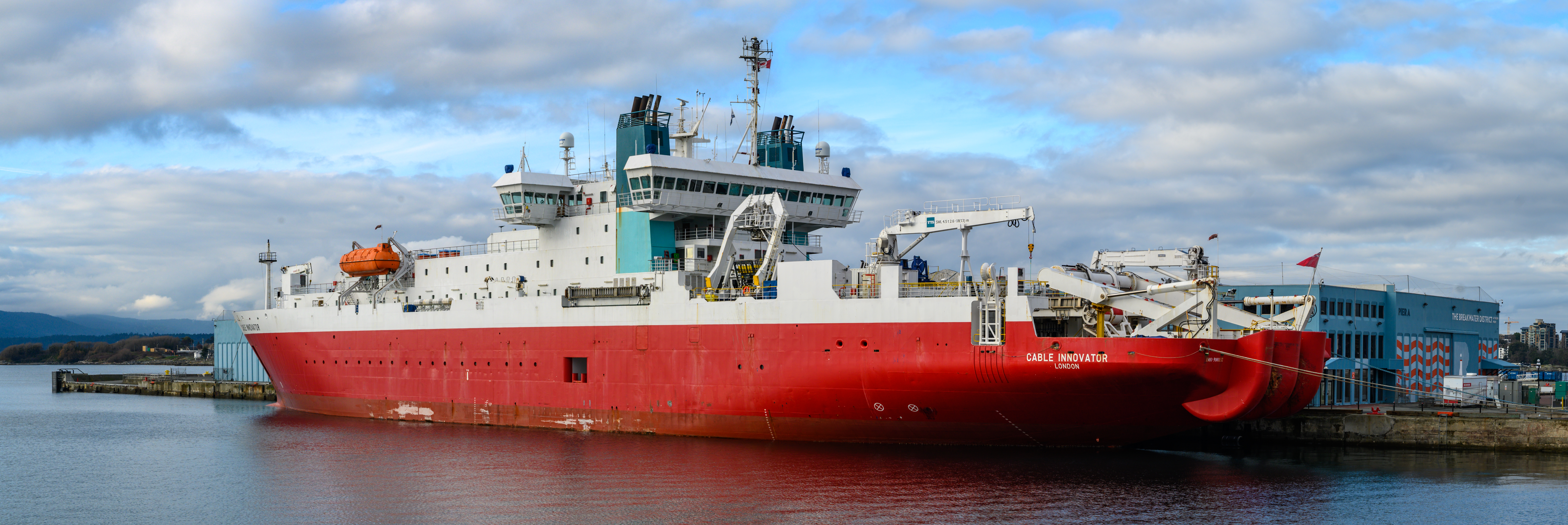
CS Cable Innovator at anchor in Victoria, British Columbia, Canada, showing a modern design without bow sheaves

The most common laying engine in use is the Linear Cable Engine (LCE). The LCE is used to feed the cable down to the ocean floor, but this device can also be reversed and used to bring back up cable needing repair. These engines can feed 800 feet (240 m) of cable a minute. Ships are limited to a speed of eight knots (15 km/h) while laying cable to ensure the cable lies on the sea floor properly and to compensate for any small adjustments in course that might affect the cables' position, which must be carefully mapped so that they can be found again if they need to be repaired. Linear Cable Engines are also equipped with a brake system that allows the flow of cable to be controlled or stopped if a problem arises. A common system used is a fleeting drum, a mechanical drum fitted with eoduldes (raised surfaces on the drum face) that help slow and guide the cable into the LCE. Cable ships also use “plows” that are suspended under the vessel. These plows use jets of high-pressure water to bury cable three feet (0.91 m) under the sea floor, which prevents fishing vessels from snagging cables as thrall their nets.

HMTS Monarch (renamed CS Sentinel 13 October 1970) completed the first transatlantic telephone cable, TAT-1, in 1956 from Scotland to Nova Scotia for Britain's General Post Office (GPO).

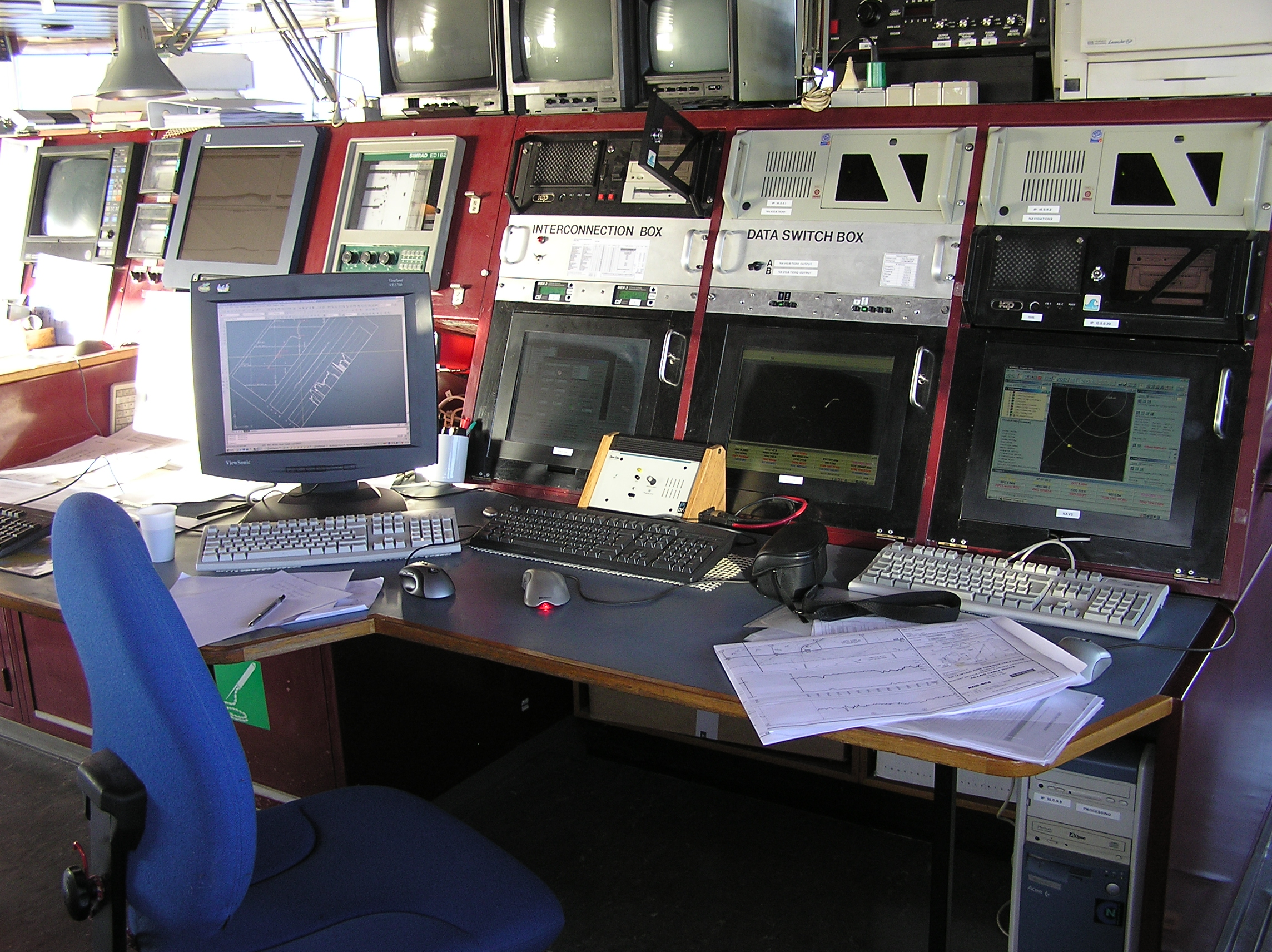
CS Peter Faber navigation systems and other equipment in 2005

The Ocean Marine System Group used a cable laying software designed by Makai Ocean Engineering Inc., in five of their cable installation and repair vessels. The MakaiLay software has been used by 90% of the worlds' global fleet of cable ships. These five OMS vessels were installed with this software on August 23, 2023, to reduce failures during installation and increase reliability, safety, speed, and accuracy:

- CS Cable Vigilance
- CS Île de Ré (Formerly Alcatel/Alcatel-Lucent/Nokia ship)
- CS Lodbrog (Formerly Alcatel/Alcatel-Lucent ship)
- CS Teneo
- Peter Faber (Formerly Alcatel-Lucent/Nokia ship)

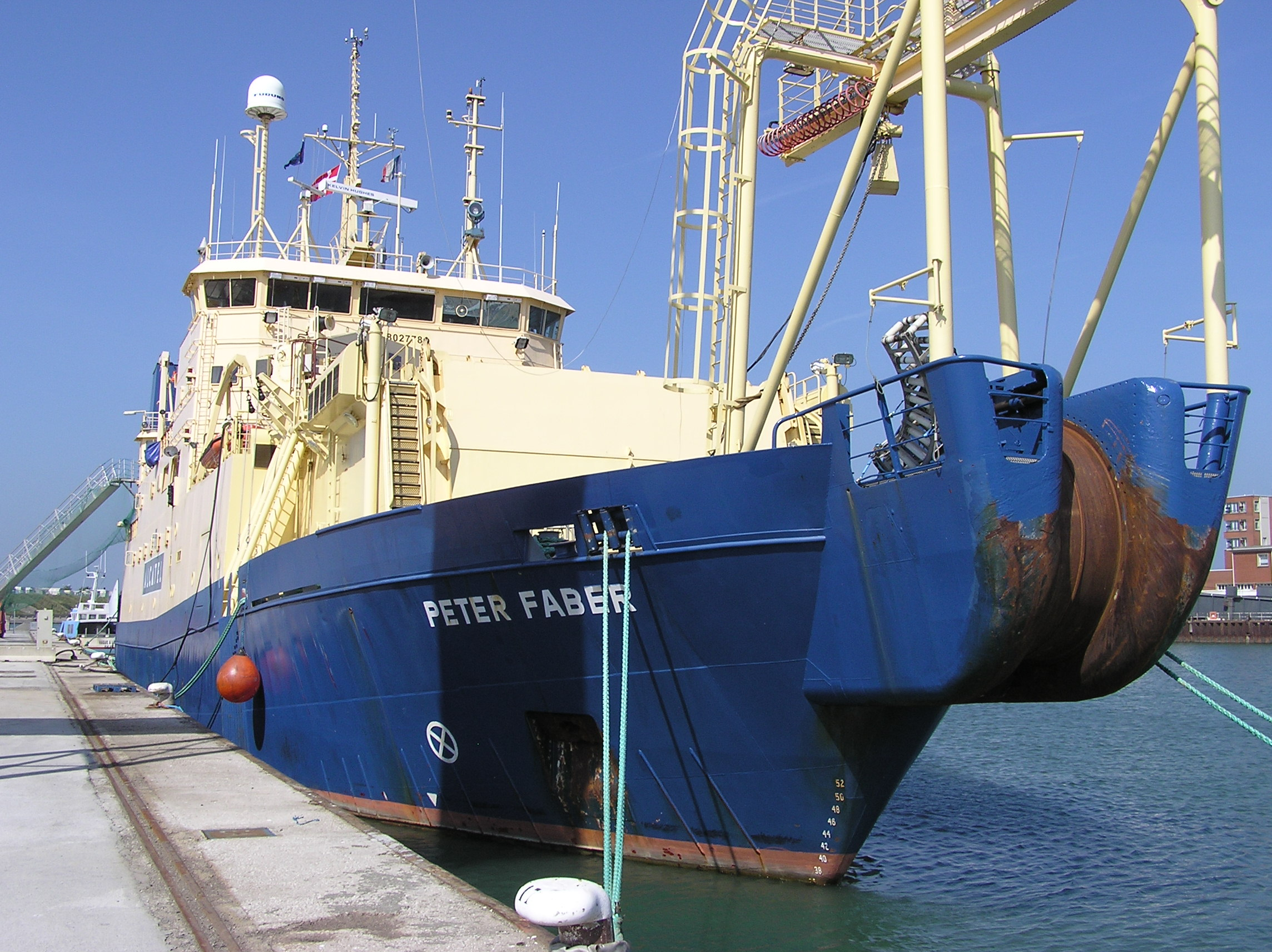
The Alcatel CS MV Peter Faber in 2005 docked at Calais, France where Alcatel has a cable factory

=== Repeaters ===
When coaxial cables were introduced as submarine cables, a new issue with cable-laying was encountered. These cables had periodic repeaters inline with the cable and powered through it. Repeaters overcame significant transmission problems on submarine cables. The difficulty with laying repeaters is that there is a bulge where they are spliced in to the cable and this causes problems passing through the sheave. British ships, such as HMTS Monarch and HMTS Alert solved the problem by providing a trough for the repeater to bypass the sheave. A rope connected in parallel to the repeater went through the sheave which pulled the cable back in to the sheave after the repeater had passed. It was normally necessary for the ship to slow down while the repeater was being laid. American ships, for a time, tried using flexible repeaters which passed through the sheave. However, by the 1960s they were also using rigid repeaters similar to the British system.

Another issue with coaxial repeaters is that they are much heavier than the cable. To ensure that they sink at the same rate as the cable (which can take some time to reach the bottom) and keep the cable straight, the repeaters are fitted with parachutes.

== List of cable ships ==
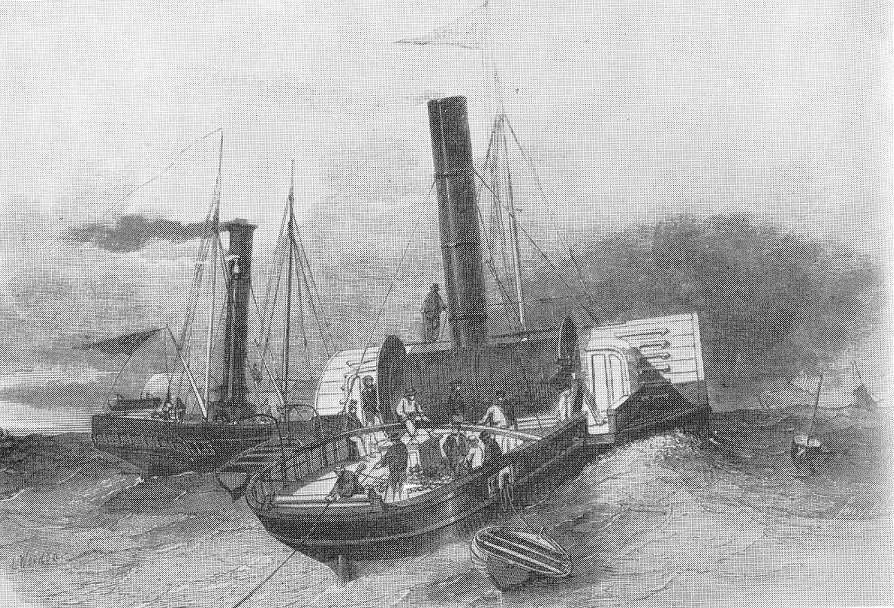
Goliath

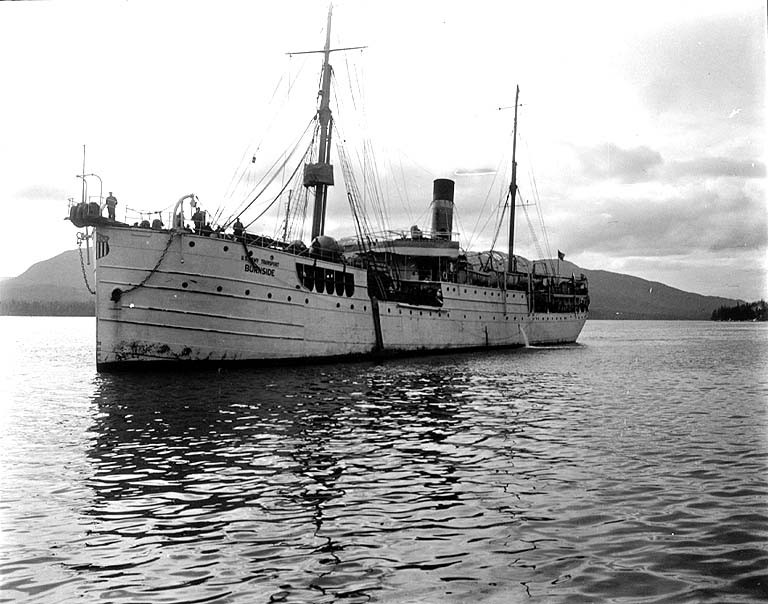
Cable ship Burnside in Ketchikan, Alaska, June 1911

- Princess Clementine was a passenger ferry, in 1849, installed two miles (3.2 km) of cable from the coast of Folkestone to the shoreline of railway telegraph lines. Charles Vincent Walker of the South Eastern Railway Company conceived this cable for to have ship to shore telegraph messages communications.
- Goliath, the first ship to lay an ocean cable in 1850. Done for the Submarine Telegraph Company across the English Channel.
- Blazer, the hulk vessel laid the South Foreland and Sangatte cable by Submarine Telegraph Company in 1851.
- Red Rover in 1851, a steam tug, worked on the South Foreland and Sangatte replacement cable with new section of armored cable.
- HMS Widgeon in 1851, the vessel provided a slice at sea on the new section cable of South Foreland and Sangatte with the failed rendezvous with Red Rover.
- CS Monarch (1830–1883), first ship to be permanently fitted out as a cable ship
- HMS Agamemnon (1852–1870) a converted British warship, involved in the first Ireland and US cabling of 1857. Cable laying began off Ireland's Ballycarbery Castle in County Kerry. During this operation, 2,500 nautical miles (4,600 km; 2,900 mi) of cable were stored on each ship, but 300 feet (91 m) of cable was lost over a region known as Telegraph Plateau in the North Atlantic with depths nearly 10,500 ft (3,200 m). Attempts with USS Niagara failed twice that year and work was abandoned, until next year, both ships met in the mid-Atlantic for spicing of their cables and HMS Agamemnon traveled east towards Valentia Island. Additional breakage in the cable occurred and another attempts to lay the cabling were sort of successful. A failure occurred in the installed cable after a month due to engineer mishandling causing damage.
- USS Niagara (1855–1885) a converted American warship, worked with HMS Agamemnon on the first US and Ireland cable run attempt failed route of 1857. In 1858, another attempt was done with middle Atlantic splicing meet by both ships, and USS Niagara laying cable as traveled westward towards Newfoundland. Three attempts were done due to further breaks in the cable. After a month of service, the cable became useless when damage was done by an engineer handling.
- SS Great Eastern, worked as a cable ship from 1865 to 1870. This paddle wheel steamship vessel was originally made as a passenger ship and performed duties during the interim until being re-fitted as a liner, showboat, and advertising vessel. In 1890, she was scrapped.
- CS Anglia (1901–1902) custom built-ship used on the 1901–1902, first trans-Pacific telegraph cable by Telegraph Construction and Maintenance Company (Telcon.)
- CS Hooper, built in Newcastle, launched 29 March 1873 for Hooper's Telegraph Works, first cable ship designed to lay trans Atlantic cable, renamed CS Silvertown in 1881. In 1901–1902, operated under CS Silvertown for the first trans-Pacific telegraph cable laying. The cable was from San Francisco, California along Hawaii, Midway, and Guam to Manila, Philippines, and continued undersea along China and Japan. A collaborated effort between two other vessels, CS Anglia and CS Colonia, and the two operating companies of the vessels: India Rubber, Gutta Percha and Telegraph Works Company with Telegraph Construction and Maintenance Company.
- CS Colonia (1901–1902) custom-built ship used on the first trans-Pacific telegraph cable of 1901–1902. The vessels' operator, Telegraph Construction and Maintenance Company (Telcon) collaborated with India Rubber, Gutta Percha, and Telegraph Works Company on the CS Silverton.
- CS H. C. Oersted, named for Hans Christian Ørsted (1872–1922) built for The Great Northern Telegraph Company 1872, was the first ship specifically designed for cable repair. Scrapped in 1922.
- CS Seine, maiden voyage 1873
- CS Faraday, built in 1874 for Siemens Brothers
- CS Gomos, the first cable ship ever to be sunk; she was rammed by another ship in the 1870s while laying a cable for the Brazilian Submarine Telegraph Company.
- CS La Plata, chartered by Siemens Brothers Ltd. from W.T. Henley's Telegraph Works Co. to lay cable between Rio de Janeiro, Brazil and Chuy, Uruguay to complete work after CS Gomos sunk. Foundered 29 November 1874 in the Bay of Biscay with loss of 58 crew and the cable.
- CS Ambassador during the laying of Brazil and Uruguay cable route for the Brazilian Submarine Telegraph Company, its partner ship, CS Gomos was sunk in the operations by a ramming ship. Afterwards, the CS La Plata was partnered with the CS Ambassador with cable but sunk in Bay of Biscay before working on the completion of the route. The CS Ambassador was able to finish the laying.
- CS Burnside (1882–1924) British/Spanish/American ship. Built for W. Lund of London and named Yeoman. Ship was planned for an Australian cable laying route and initially named Yeoman. Sold to Spain in 1891, as Rita, and captured by US, renaming as Burnside. Completed work in laying cable in the Philippines after CS Hooker sunk. In 1903, laid the US-Alaska cable from Sitka to Juneau. Scrapped in 1924.
- CS Monarch (1883–1915) British ship. Second cable ship with the name. Sunk in 1915.
- CS Mackay-Bennett, in service from 1884 until 1922, and best known for recovering the bodies of the victims of the Titanic disaster in 1912
- CS Alert (1890–1915), cut important German cables in World War I
- CS Cambria (1905), sank in Montevideo harbour, Uruguay, in 1945
- HMTS Monarch (1916–1945) British ship. Third cable ship with the name. Sunk in 1945. Was to be the second CS Alert.
- HMTS Alert (1918–1945) Second cable ship with the name. Sunk in 1945.
- CS Faraday (1923)
- CS Telconia, in service from 1910 until 1934
- HMTS Alert (1945–1960) Third cable ship with the name. Scrapped in 1960.
- HMTS Monarch/CS Sentinel (1945–1977) British ship. Chartered by AT&T Corp. for operations until CS Long Lines was commissioned for company use. The TAT-1, submarine transatlantic telephone cable system was laid in the 1950s between Clarenville, Newfoundland and Oban, Scotland. Fourth cable ship with the name. Operated in 1956 on TAT-2. Renamed in 1970 as the second CS Sentinel when sold to Cable & Wireless plc.
- CS Lidiv (Decommissioned 1955) Built for AT&T Corp. for New York Telephone Company use. Decommissioned in 1955 and the CS Cable Queen was the replacement.
- CS Cable Queen (Built 1951–1952) Built for AT&T Corp. for the Bell System usage by New York Telephone Company. A 65-foot small-scale underwater telephone cable-laying vessel. Decommissioned after 1989 with over 100,000 miles of cable laying.
- CS Salernum/Charles L. Brown (Built 1954) Built in Italy and named CS Salernum. Dimensions were length as 339.6 ft, breadth as 41.0 ft, depth as 18.5 ft, and gross tonnage at 2,789. Purchased by AT&T Corp. through its subsidiary, Transoceanic Cableship Co., in 1984. Sold by AT&T in 1997 to Tyco International in the AT&T Submarine Systems fleet purchases. The wreck became an artificial reef in the Dutch Caribbean island, Sint Eustatius.

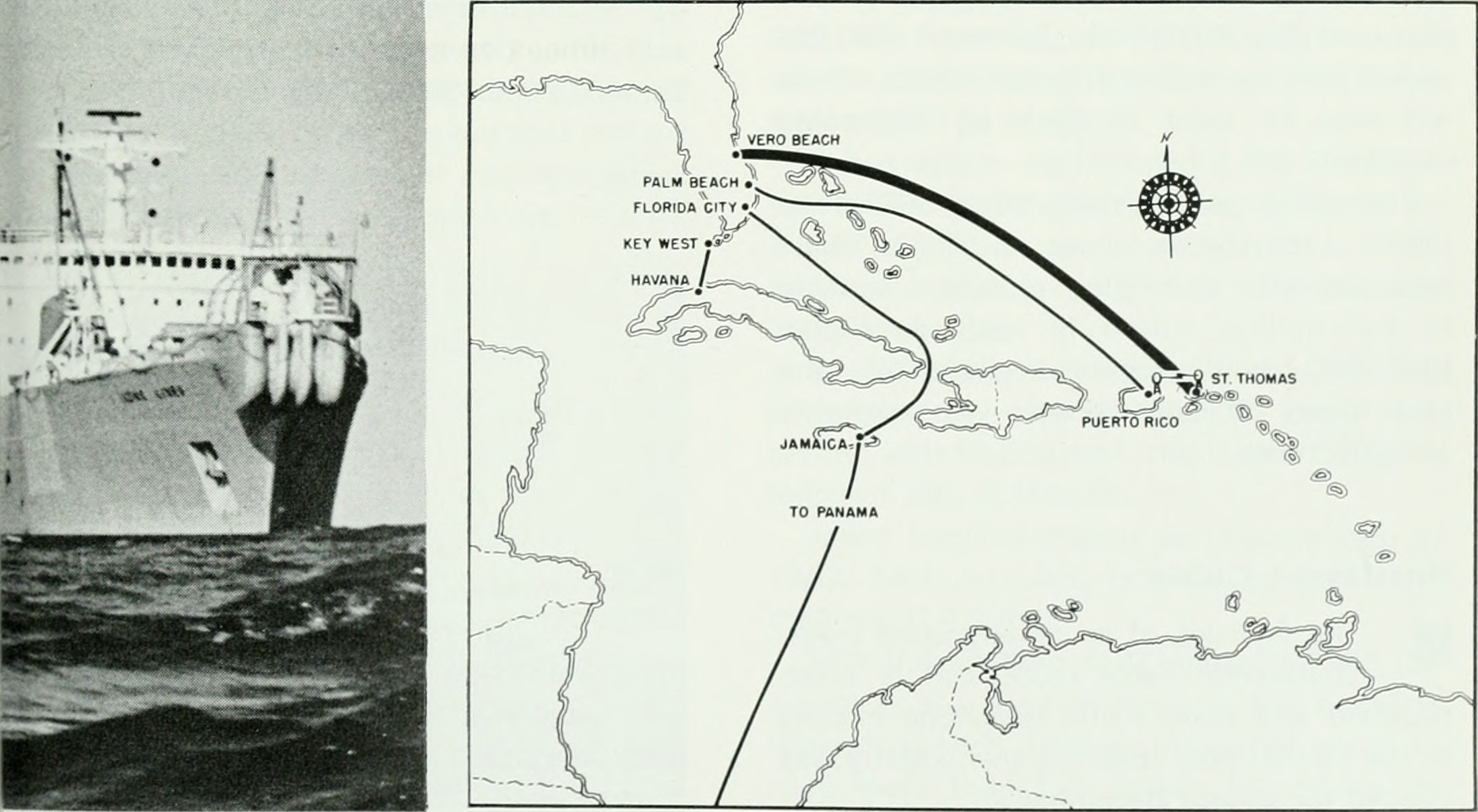
AT&T Long Lines cable ship working on the cable linking mainland Vero Beach, Florida to St. Thomas in the Virgin Islands. Typical maps, US to Venezuela cable route.

- CS Long Lines (Built 1961–1963) Built for AT&T Corp. for the 1961 launching, but cable laying assignments began in 1963. The $19 million vessel was 511 feet length and 11,300 tons. Performed the laying of the first trans-Pacific telephone cable, known as TRANSPAC-1 (TPC-1) in 1964. and the first trans-Pacific fiber cable, known as TPC 3. Sold in 1997 to Tyco International. Scrapped in 2003.
- HMTS Alert (1961) In 1988, was owned by British Telecom when it worked a joint operation with CS Long Lines and CS Vercors on the first transatlantic fiber optic cable, TAT-8. The three cable laying points originated from three telephone companies owned vessels in three countries. Britain was Widemouth Bay, England.
- CS Mercury (1962–1997) by Cammell Laird & Company, Birkenhead. Built for Cable & Wireless, laid the COMPAC and SEACOM cable systems.
- CS KDD Maru (1967) Owned by Kokusai Denshin Denwa Company Participated in the joint cable laying of TPC-3 with CS Long Lines.
- HMTS Monarch (1973–2003) British ship. Fifth cable ship with the name.
- CS Vercors/Chamarel (1974) In 1988, was owned by France Telecom when it worked a joint operation with CS Alert and CS Long Lines on the first transatlantic fiber optic cable, TAT-8. The three cable laying points originated from three countries and three different telephone company vessels. France was Penmarch, France. Later operated by Orange. The United States point was Tuckerton, New Jersey. The communications transmission capacity reached in 18 months beyond expectations that other lines would be needed within a decade.
- CS Tyco Provider/Provider 1 (1978) Built in Finland, named, Stakhanovets Yermolenko until March 1998. Became the Tyco Provider until 2003. The vessel was in service in May 2004 and was not docked at a port, according to a log. The renamed ship, as Provider 1, was operated by Allseas Marine Contractors S.A. in the log until June 2005 showed the name of Calamity Jane. Listed in 2019 as Tyco property, under the Marshall Islands.
- CS Raymond Croze (1982) Used by Orange UK, the vessel was 40 years old in 2022 when a replacement was being planned by Orange Marine, the subsidiary of Orange. New ship launching was planned for 2023 after new vessel would be completed.
- CS Global Link (Built 1990s) Owned by Transoceanic Cable Ship Co., a subsidiary of the United States–based telephone company, AT&T Corp.. It was a sister ship and identical to CS Global Sentinel.

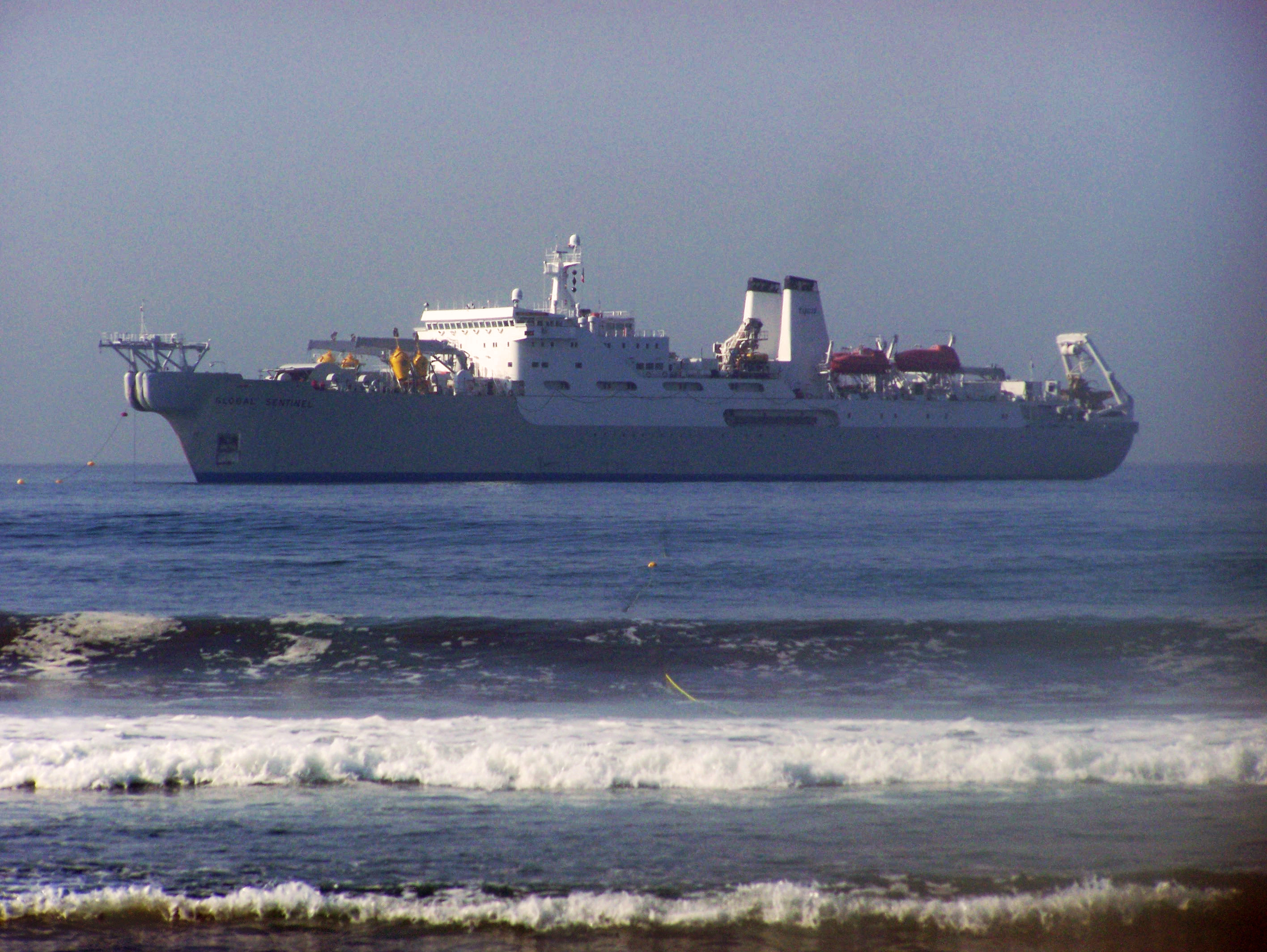
CS Global Sentinel, built in 1992 for AT&T and sold to Tyco Submarine Systems in 1997. Managed by Transoceanic Cable Ship. Laying cable in 2008.

- CS Global Sentinel (Built 1992) Maiden voyage from shipyard to Honolulu was February 1992. The 479-foot vessel equipped with bow thrusters, began cable laying operations in early 1992. Owned by Transoceanic Cable Ship Co., a subsidiary of the United States telephone company, AT&T Corp..
- CS Global Mariner (Built 1992) Built in Singapore. The vessel was equipped with bow and stern thrusters only and had storage space for up to 4100 nautical miles of cable. Seafaring was done in December 1992 by Seafarers International Union crew. A SIU publication, Seafarers Log, indicated in January 1993 the vessel was the fifth cable ship of the AT&T Corp. fleet. Owned by Transoceanic Cable Ship Co., the subsidiary of the United States AT&T telephone company.
- CS Cable Innovator (Built 1995) This vessel was built in Kvaerner Masa Shipyard, Turku, Finland for the United Kingdom. The ship was part of Cable & Wireless plc (Marine) Ltd. The C&W fleet was transferred to Global Marine. The length is 476 feet (145 meters) and has a gross tonnage of 14,277. The ship can carry 8,000 tons of cable.

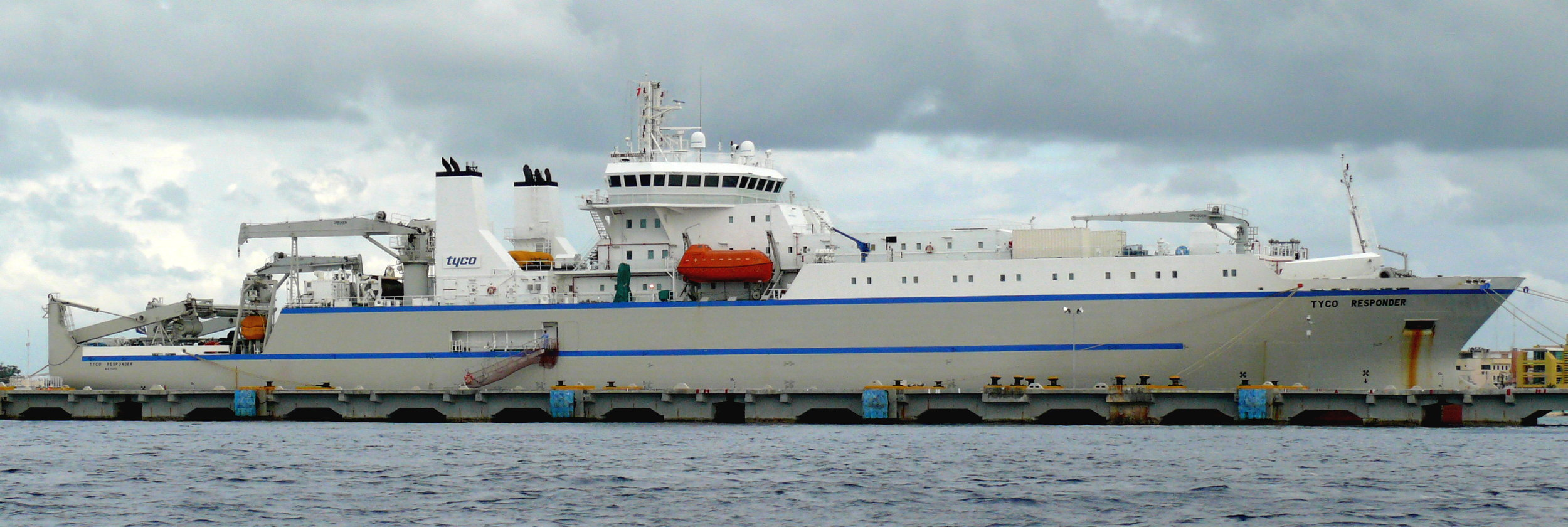
CS Responder in 2008, at the island of Cozumel in Quintana Roo, Mexico

- CS Responder (2000–2020) Built for Maersk and TYCOM. The vessel was in service on April 24, 2004, when arrived at Hovensa port of the American Virgin Islands, according to a log. In 2016, belonged to KT Submarine. In September 2020, while operating on cable laying off South Korea, the ship caught on fire and sunk. Listed in 2019 as one of the six ships belonging Tyco Telecommunications (TYCOM). The vessel is part of the Reliance-class fleet.
- CS Reliance (2002) Built in 2002. The vessel is part of the Reliance-class fleet and was in service on May 1, 2004, as was docked at Bristol port, according to a log. Listed in 2019 as one of the six ships belonging Tyco Telecommunications (TYCOM). In 2020, provided the first half of the commercial cable from Perth, Australia, to the middle of the Indian Ocean for Subcom.
- CS Resolute (2002) The vessel is part of the Reliance-class fleet and was in service in May 2004 and was not docked at a port, according to a log. Listed in 2019 as one of the six ships belonging Tyco Telecommunications (TYCOM) with Marshall Islands. The vessel operates at speed of 14 knots with 40 meters length and has a 21 meters beam. Tonnage is 12,184. There are five main diesel engines on board and cable laying capacity is about 5,465.5 metric tons.
- CS Dependable (2002) The vessel was in service in May 2004 and was not docked at a port, according to a log. Listed in 2019 as one of the six ships belonging to Tyco Telecommunications (TYCOM). In 2018, Tyco sold, the cable unit subsidiary, TE SubCom, for $325 million to a New York–based private equity firm with the ship assets. Currently used by Subcom, a New Jersey–based company contracted by the U.S. military in laying internet or surveillance cables. In 2021, U.S. Department of Transportation (DOT) awarded a $10 million-a-year contract to provide undersea cable security with two ships. Subcom selected this ship with the CS Decisive for clandestine operations for laying cables for partnership with the Department of Defense in national security. In 2022, provided the second half of a commercial cable from the middle of the Indian Ocean to Diego Garcia that was started by CS Reliance. Continued to lay the rest of the main cable to Oman. The vessel is part of the Reliance Class fleet.

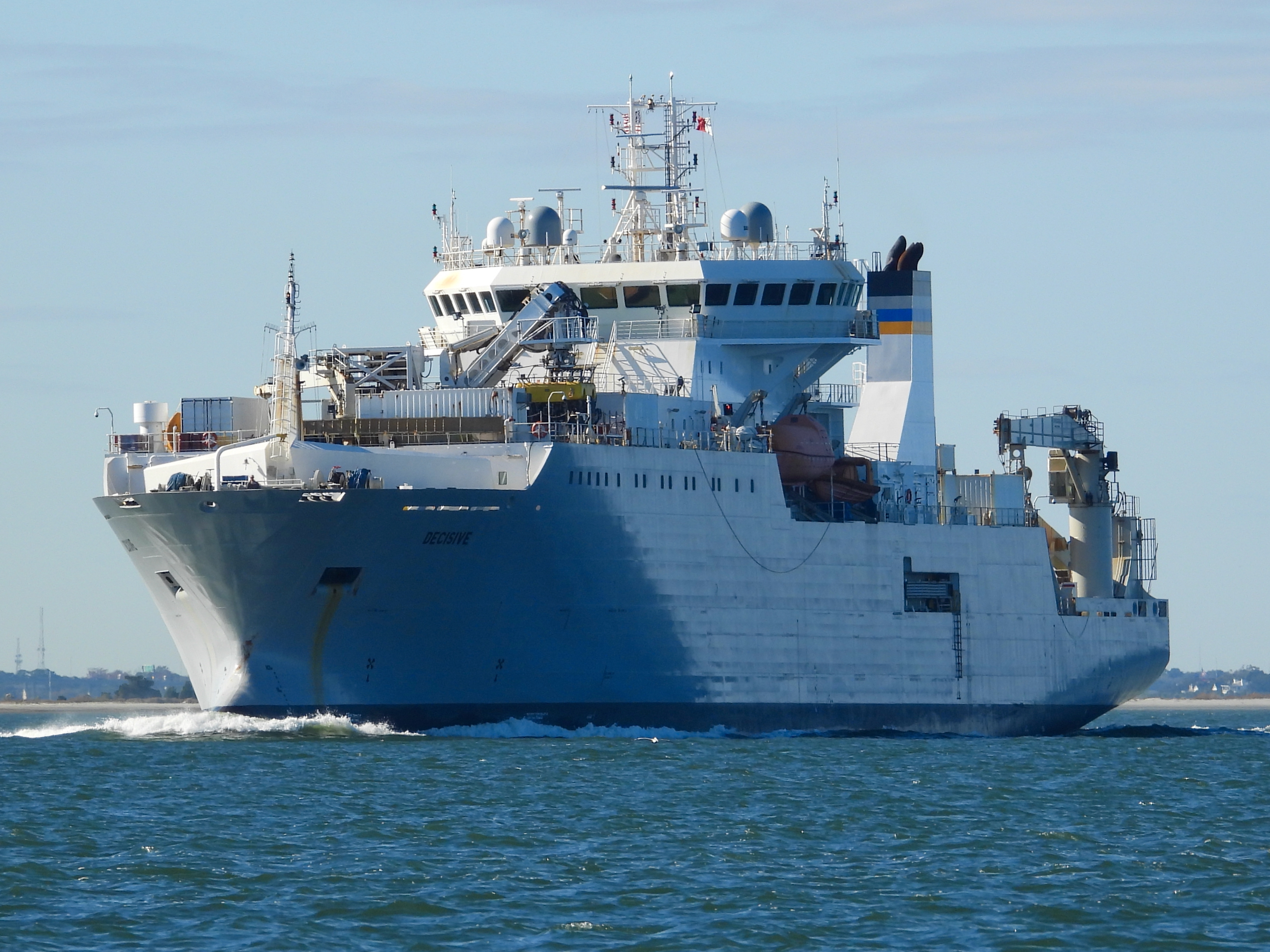
CS Decisive departing Charleston, South Carolina, in 2025

- CS Decisive (2003) The vessel is part of the Reliance-class fleet and was in service on May 12, 2004, when arrived at Baltimore port, according to a log. Listed in 2019 as one of the six ships belonging to Tyco Telecommunications (TYCOM). This vessel is part of the U.S. government's first Cable Security Fleet with additionally, CS Dependable, under Subcom ownership. In 2021, U.S. Department of Transportation (DOT) awarded a $10 million-a-year contract to provide undersea cable security with two ships. Subcom selected this ship with the CS Dependable for responsibility for maintaining or repairing cables for economic interests with the U.S. Department of Defense partnership. In 2020, provided the first half of the commercial cable from Perth, Australia, to the middle of the Indian Ocean for Subcom.

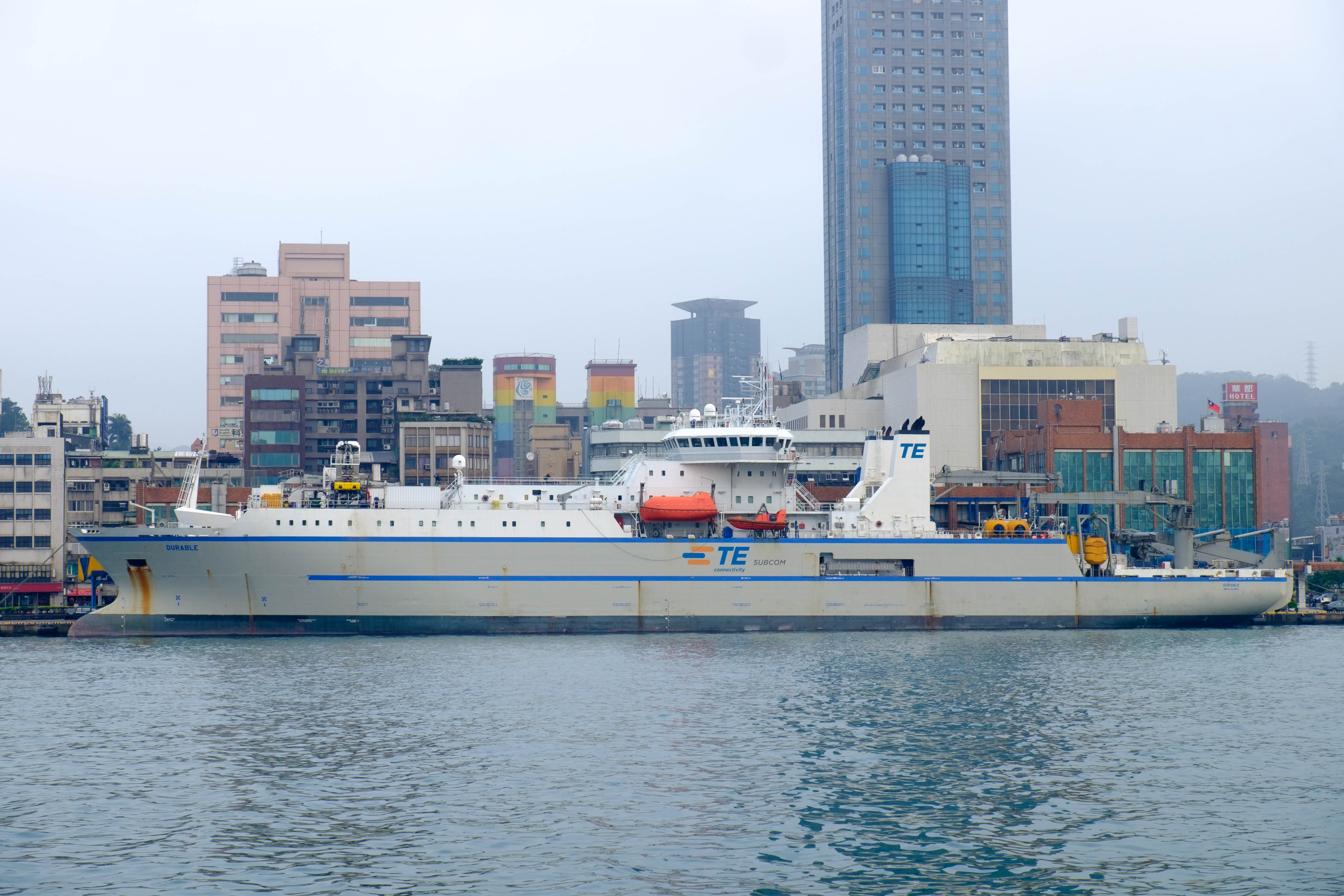
CS Durable, under the TE Subcom operation, was at Keelung Port in 2015

- CS Durable (2003) The vessel was in service on May 8, 2004, and set sail from Singapore port, according to a log. Listed in 2019 as one of the six ships belonging Tyco Telecommunications (TYCOM). The vessel is part of the Reliance Class fleet.
- CS Fu Tai (Built 2007) Built in Spain for offshore construction purposes. Purchased by Chinese S.B.Submarine Systems (SBSS) in 2021 for a retrofit conversion as a cable ship. Launched in 2022 for those cable ship purposes.
- CS Pierre de Fermat (2014) Used by Orange UK, the vessel was the first new ship built by Orange Marine, since the CS Raymond Croze was launched in 1983 for cable laying.
- CS MV Lida (Still operating in 2022) South Africa's Mertech Marine owns this cable retrieval ship as of 2022 and planned a retirement of the vessel with an unforeseen replacement date.
- MV Maasvliet (Built 2023/2024) Launched on January 11, 2024, from Nantong, China shipyards. This cable recovery vessel is a 89.43 metres (293.4 feet) length ship, registered in Netherlands as built, owned, and operated by Netherland companies. Subsea Environmental Services chartered this cargo vessel with diesel-electric engines for cable recovery use. This is one of five designed ships by Conoship International, a Dutch naval architecture firm. By August 2025, the ship had recovered 1,012 kilometers of cable from the defunct TAT-8 fiber undersea communications cable. The cable is being transported to Leixoes port in Portugal, and recycling done in South Africa by Mertech Marine of the cables two metals and two types of polyethylene.

=== Royal Navy ===
- HMS Pique (1834), fifth-rate frigate used in 1845 as a cable ship
- HMS Agamemnon (1852), 91-gun steam line-of-battle ship used as a cable ship in 1857 as part of the effort to lay the first transatlantic telegraph cable
- HMS Thrush (1889), composite gunboat used briefly as a cable ship in 1915
- HMS Squirrel (1904), coast guard vessel used as a cable ship in 1917

=== US Navy ===
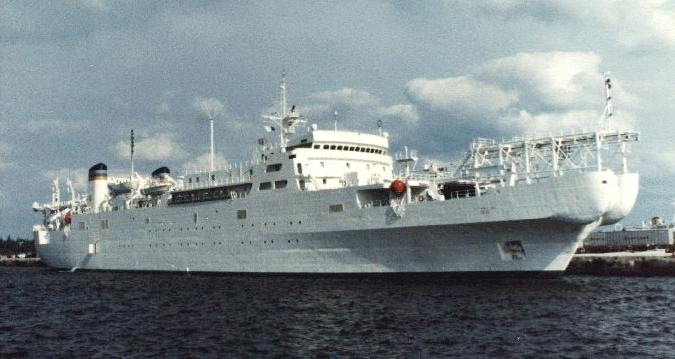
USNS Zeus, with both bow and stern sheaves

- USS Portunus (ARC-1) 1951–1959
- USNS Neptune (ARC-2) 1973–1992
- USS Aeolus (ARC-3) 1973–1985
- USS Thor (ARC-4) 3 January 1956 to 2 July 1973
- USS Yamacraw (ARC-5) 1959–1965
- USNS Albert J. Myer (T-ARC-6) 1963–1994
- USNS Zeus (T-ARC-7) 1984–present, only ship in class

== See also ==
- List of auxiliaries of the United States Navy § Cable Repair Ships (ARC)
- List of ships of the United States Army § Cable laying ships
- List of international submarine communications cables
- Optical fiber
- Submarine communications cable
- Submarine power cable
- Pipe-laying ship
