= HMTS Monarch (1945) =

British cable-laying ship

History
- Name: Monarch (1945–1970); Sentinel (1970–1977)
- Owner: General Post Office (1945–1969); Post Office (1969–1970); Cable & Wireless Ltd. (1970–1977)
- Operator: General Post Office (1945–1969); Post Office (1969–1970); Cable & Wireless Ltd. (1970–1977)
- Builder: Swan, Hunter & Wigham Richardson Ltd., Neptune Yard, Walker-on-Tyne
- Yard number: 1768
- Launched: 8 August 1945
- Completed: February 1946
- In service: 1946
- Out of service: 1977
- Fate: Scrapped November 1977

General characteristics
- Tonnage: 8,056 GRT; 8,950 DWT
- Displacement: 14,000 tons (fully loaded)
- Length: 475 ft (144.8 m) LOA; 435 ft (132.6 m) LBP
- Beam: 55 ft 6 in (16.9 m)
- Draft: 27 ft 10 in (8.5 m) (fully loaded)
- Installed power: Four boilers for main engines and steam auxiliaries, including two steam turbines for electrical plant.; Cable machinery all electrically driven; Two 100 kilowatt steam turbo-generator sets; Two 100 kilowatt 8 cylinder diesel driven generator sets
- Propulsion: Two triple expansion steam engines, total 4,500 h.p.
- Speed: 14.5 kn (26.9 km/h; 16.7 mph)
- Capacity: 125,000 cubic feet (3,539.6 m^{3}) coiled cable in four tanks

HMTS Monarch, launched on 8 August 1945 and completed during February 1946, was the fourth cable ship with that name. The ship was built for the General Post Office (GPO) for the laying and repair of submarine communications cable and was the largest cable ship in the world when completed and the first cable ship to have all electric cable machinery. The ship was first engaged in repair and update of existing cables which had been neglected during the war. Monarch laid the first transatlantic telephone cable TAT-1.

In 1969 When the GPO became a public corporation, the Post Office, the designation "Her Majesty's Telegraph Ship" (HMTS) became the more conventional, commercial designation "Cable Ship" (CS). In 1970 the ship was sold to Cable & Wireless and renamed Sentinel. (Note: A fifth, smaller, Monarch for the Post Office was launched in 1975.)

== Background ==
The war loss of CS Faraday left Britain without a large cable ship. The government decided the national need for such a ship should be met by construction of a modern cable ship to be assigned to the General Post Office. Cable ships have unique requirements related to having long idle periods in port between cable laying or repairs, operation at low speeds or stopped at sea during cable operations, long periods running astern, high maneuverability, and a fair speed to reach operation areas. Electric drive was considered, but with the war were difficult to obtain. The design thus settled on oil fired boilers and two triple expansion steam engines driving two shafts. After design and model tests with design later coordinated with the builders to refine the final construction plans.

This was to be the fourth cable ship to bear the name Monarch (the first was built in 1830 and was the first to be fitted out permanently as a cable ship; the second Monarch, sunk by a mine in 1915, had been the first cable ship built for the General Post Office; the third Monarch was sunk by a mine in 1944).

== Construction ==
Monarch was designed by General Post Office engineers under the Engineer in Chief with the design completed in 1942 but construction delayed by war needs until late 1944. The ship was built at Swan Hunter (Swan, Hunter & Wigham Richardson, Ltd), as hull 1768 at the Neptune Yard, Walker-on-Tyne (Low Walker), and launched on 8 August 1945. The ship, largest cable ship in the world at the time of its launch, was completed and handed over to the Postmaster General in February, 1946.

=== Dimensions & capacities ===
The ship, as built, was 8,056 GRT, 8,950 DWT, fully loaded displacement of 14,000 tons, 475 ft (144.8 m) length overall, 435 ft (132.6 m) length between perpendiculars, 55 ft 6 in (16.9 m) breadth, and a draft, fully loaded, of 27 ft 10 in (8.5 m). Four 41 ft (12.5 m) diameter cable tanks of 170,000 cubic feet (4,813.9 m^{3}) total volume were capable of holding 125,000 cubic feet (3,539.6 m^{3}) of coiled cable. The tanks held 2,500 nmi (2,900 mi; 4,600 km) of deep sea telegraph cable or 1,500 nmi (1,700 mi; 2,800 km) of coaxial telephone cable with repeaters. A hold, forward of the cable tanks, was available for lines and cable buoys. Oil bunkers had a 2,000 ton capacity with boiler feed and fresh water capacity each of 400 tons.

=== Cable machinery ===
Monarch differed from all previous cable ships in having all electric cable machinery. That avoided the need to run high pressure steam piping through forward parts of the ship and condensation problems in cold weather but had disadvantages regarding even torque and variable cable load from zero to full load. The ship's three cable engines, two forward (160 h.p. motors) for picking up or paying out and one aft (90 h.p) used for braking in stern laying, were supplied power by an unusual system of a constant current power supply to meet the requirements of cable laying. The cable machinery forward was for laying cable in shallower water or picking up and retrieving cable in all depths. The aft machinery would be used for long deep water cable runs.

The motors were fitted to the cable drum with reduction gears to give a slow speed at 20 ton load of 0.75 nmi (0.86 mi; 1.39 km) per hour to a fast speed at 6.5 ton load of 3 nmi (3.5 mi; 5.6 km) per hour. The novel arrangement allowed electric motors to stall yet still exert holding effect similar to that of steam driven cable machinery. The system also allowed regenerative power so that energy developed by cable being paid out can be used to provide electrical power to the ship's lighting and other systems. The anchor windlass and capstan motors were electrically powered.

The most prominent external feature of cable ships until some recently designed were the bow sheaves and often stern sheaves that are included in length overall and are subject to change as cable machinery and needs change, thus will be a factor in length overall measurement as ships are modified. (Note: Photos of Albert J. Myer show the change in bow sheaves after a modernization. In that case the entire ship was essentially rebuilt. The Monarch (4) page at History of the Atlantic Cable & Undersea Communications has a painting of Monarch anchored off Sesimbra during 1969 operations showing the drastic change in the ship's bow after the 1968 modernization.) After a 1968 modification Monarch had three bow sheaves, a 5 ft 10 in (1.8 m) flat surface sheave and two 6 ft (1.8 m) "V" sheaves, and one 7 ft (2.1 m) "V" stern sheave. The model at the Telegraph Museum Porthcurno shows an original configuration in which a "V" sheave was in the center flanked by two flat sheaves.

=== Ship's power ===
Four main oil fired boilers, 15 ft (4.6 m) in diameter and 11 ft 6 in (3.5 m) long, provided steam for the main engine and steam driven auxiliaries. Two triple expansion engines with cylinders 21 in (53.3 cm), 35 in (88.9 cm), and 60 in (152.4 cm) with a 30 in (76.2 cm) stroke develop 4,500 horsepower for a top speed of 14.5 kn (26.9 km/h; 16.7 mph).

Electricity for both cable machinery and general ship's electrical power was provided by two steam turbines, with their own condensers and pumps making them independent of the main engine steam system, each driving through gearing two 100 kilowatt generator sets. The solution to electrical cable machinery involved combined use of constant voltage at 220 volts, used for both the machinery and general ship's service, and another providing constant current at 300 amperes used in the cable machinery solution. One generator set of each system is dual purpose while the other is permanently connected to the constant voltage board.

In addition to the main generator sets there were two 100 kilowatt generator sets driven by two eight-cylinder, 192 bhp (143 kW), Paxman-Ricardo diesels that are for emergency use or when the ship is in port with the boilers are shut down. One of the sets is for dual use, constant current or constant voltage while the other is only for constant voltage so that either or both could be used for the 220 volt ship's service or, for emergency cable operation, one could be providing constant 220 volts and the other 300 ampere constant current.

== Deck layout in 1946 ==
The Monarch's deck layout as outlined in The Shipbuilder & Marine Engine-Builder, April 1946, Plates IV and V, (Note: Detailed inboard profile and plans are on pages 132—133 of A. J. Gill's "H.M.T.S. Monarch" in The Post Office Electrical Engineers' Journal.) can be described as follows:

- Wheelhouse Top: radar hut; signal platform.
- Navigating Bridge: the wheelhouse; chart-room; radio-room.
- Captain's Bridge: captain's day-cabin; captain's bedroom; cable engineer's quarters; cable representative's quarters; 26-foot cutters; 30-foot general service launches.
- Boat Deck (and Docking Bridge): mostly officers' quarters, including deck officers, radio officers, and engineers; drawing office; five 30-foot wooden lifeboats (whalers) and one 30-foot wooden motorboat.
- Shelter Deck (weather deck): cable hatches; testing room; chief electrician's quarters; dining saloon and pantry; purser's office; cabins of the cable engineers; engineers' duty mess; cabins for the ship's electricians, deck engineers, and radio officers; galley; crew's library and writing room; surgery and ship's hospital.
- Main Deck: lamp room; cable stores; various workshops such as the carpenter's shop, the blacksmith's shop, and the joiner's shop; cabins for cable staff, quartermasters, domestic staff, petty officers, cable hands, stewards, engine-room ratings, and seamen, as well as mess-spaces; butcher's shop; crew galley; officers' laundry; bakery.
- Lower Deck: mostly taken up by the upper portions of the four cable tanks, oil-fuel bunkers, the boiler room, and the engine room, as well as the chain locker and rope stowage spaces; paint store; carpenter's wood store; cargo space; bosun's store; electrical spare-gear store; joiner's store; diesel generators; meat room and vegetable room; refrigerating machinery space; engineer's paint store.
- Orlop Deck: fore-peak; cargo hold; chain locker; rope stowage; cable tanks No. 1, No. 2, No. 3, and No. 4, each 41 feet in diameter; fresh water tanks; deep ballast tanks; oil-fuel bunkers; boiler room; engine room; feed water tanks; after peak tank.

== 1968 refit ==
The ship was radically changed during the 1968 refit with removal of the centre mast, a new deck house forward and major change to the bow sheaves.

== Career ==
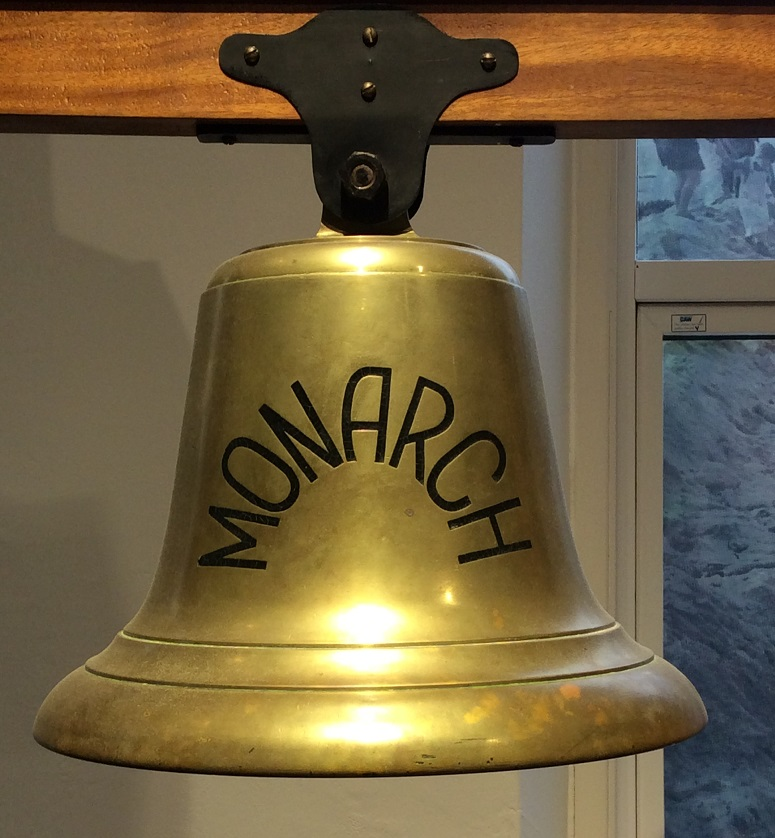
Bell from cable ship HMTS Monarch, on display at Porthcurno Telegraph Museum, January 2019.

Over the course of its career, it laid or helped lay telecommunications cables all over the world, including TAT-1 in 1956, HAW-1 (the telephone cable between the continental United States and Hawaii) in 1957, the second transatlantic telephone cable TAT-2 in 1959, the first Canadian transatlantic telephone cable CANTAT-1 in 1961, the Commonwealth Pacific Cable System (COMPAC) in 1963, and the South Atlantic cable SAT-1 in 1968.

As one of the largest submarine cable laying ships, the Monarch was much in demand. It was chartered by Cable & Wireless for COMPAC, where it worked with the company's ships CS Retriever (Note: CS Retriever, fifth cable ship with that name, 4,000 GRT, built 1961, Cammell Laird & Co., Birkenhead.) and the CS Mercury (Note: CS Mercury, 8,962 GRT, built 1962 by Cammell Laird & Company, Birkenhead.) in the southern Pacific.

The ship's operation on the COMPAC segment between Suva and Auckland is an example of an oceanic cable layer connecting shore ends and terminal stations. Monarch arrived in Suva in October 1962 to pick up the shore end already laid by CS Retriever, which had also laid the shore end at Takapuna in New Zealand, that was buoyed some 3.5 nmi (6.5 km; 4.0 mi) off the Samabula area of Suva. After testing to make sure the shore end was fully operational the shore end was spliced to the 1,214 nmi (1,397 mi; 2,248 km) of cable in Monarch's tanks. Monarch began the oceanic lay at dawn, 20 October, paying out cable at 6 kn (11 km/h; 6.9 mph). The ship arrived off Takapuna on 28 October, picked up the shore end there, and made the final splice on 29 October to complete the second link of COMPAC.

In 1969, as a result of the Post Office Act 1969, (Note: The legislation changed the General Post Office from a department of state to a public corporation, known as the Post Office. It also abolished the office of Postmaster General of the United Kingdom.) all General Post Office cable ships, including the Monarch, lost the use of the prefix 'HMTS' and became 'CS' (Cable Ship). The Monarch was sold in October of the following year to Cable & Wireless, who renamed it CS Sentinel, the second cable ship to bear the name.

After an extensive refit at Immingham that prioritised its cable repair facilities over cable laying, it entered operational service in March 1971. Its first captain as CS Sentinel was G. H. C. Reynolds. It had a crew of 26 officers and 89 petty officers and ratings. It was based at Vigo, Spain, and then Bermuda. CS Sentinel arrived on 25 October 1977 at Blyth, Northumberland and scrapped the next month.

== Ship models ==
The National Maritime Museum in London has a model (to 1:192 scale) of the Monarch, and there is a 10-foot (3.0 m) model in Porthcurno Telegraph Museum's collection. The ship's bell is on display at the latter.

== See also ==
- List of international submarine communications cables
- Optical fiber
- Submarine communications cable
- Submarine power cable
