= TAT-10 =

Transatlantic telephone cable

TAT-10 was AT&T Corporation's 10th transatlantic telephone cable, in operation from 1992 to 2003, initially carrying 2 x 565 Mbit/s between United States and Norden in Germany.

The A-segment was the part on the US continental shelf, the B-segment went North of Scotland, the C-segment crossed the North-Sea continental shelf to Norden. The D-segment was a special festoon leg that carried 3 x 565 Mbit/s from Norden, repeatered at land at West-Terschelling to Bergen near Alkmaar.
