= Widemouth, West Virginia =

Widemouth
- Former community
- Location within the state of West Virginia Widemouth (the United States)
- Coordinates: 37°27′20″N 81°15′51″W
- Country: United States
- State: West Virginia
- County: Mercer
- Elevation: 2,454 ft (748 m)
- Time zone: UTC-5 (Eastern (EST))
  - Summer (DST): UTC-4 (EDT)
- FIPS code: 1557361

Widemouth was an unincorporated community and coal town located in Mercer County, West Virginia.

The community takes its name from nearby Widemouth Creek.
