= TAT-5 =

Transatlantic telephone cable

TAT-5 was AT&T Corporation's 5th transatlantic telephone cable, in operation from 1970 to 1993, carrying 720 3 kHz channels, between Rhode Island, United States and Conil de la Frontera, (Cádiz), Spain. It had 361 repeaters.
