= Commonwealth Pacific Cable System =

Undersea telephone cable system

COMPAC, the Commonwealth Pacific Cable System, was an undersea telephone cable system connecting Canada with New Zealand and Australia. It was completed by closing the last gap in Honolulu Harbor, Hawaii, at 6:25 a.m. B.S.T. on October 10, 1963. Public service of the cable commenced early in December 1963.

== History ==
COMPAC was developed as a complementary system to CANTAT, the system linking Canada to the United Kingdom, which had begun operating in December 1961. COMPAC was designed to extend west towards Commonwealth nations in the Pacific, linking Vancouver to Auckland, New Zealand and Sydney, Australia, via Honolulu and Suva in Fiji. The Auckland – Sydney section was completed in early 1962, followed by the Auckland – Suva section in July, with the entire system completed by October 1963.

The system cost a total of $100 million. It spanned 14,000 miles, from Oban in Scotland via CANTAT to Newfoundland, by microwave link across Canada, then cable on to Hawaii, Suva (Fiji), Auckland (New Zealand), and Sydney (Australia). Three cable ships (CS Mercury, CS Retriever, and HMTS Monarch) laid the cable. The link contains 11,000 miles of telephone cable, which, at the time, provided 80 two-way speech channels or 1,760 teleprinter circuits. In addition, the cable carried telegraph traffic, leased circuits for airlines, shipping companies and other commercial transmission.
