= Columbus III =

Transatlantic telecommunications cable

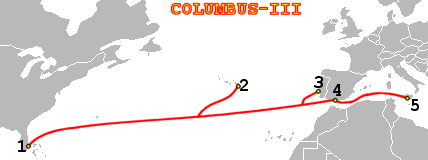
Columbus-III cable landing points in: 1) Hollywood, Florida, United States; 2) Ponta Delgada, Azores Islands, Portugal; 3) Carcavelos e Parede, Portugal; 4) Conil de la Frontera, Spain; 5) Mazara del Vallo, Sicily, Italy

Columbus-III was a transatlantic telecommunications cable connecting Europe to North America.

== History and details ==
Columbus-III entered service in December 1999 and is owned by over 30 carriers. Supported by 90 repeaters, it was 9833 km long.

After a 2009 upgrade, the capacity of the system between the United States and Portugal was increased from the original design capacity of 8 x 2.5 Gbit/s to 160 Gbit/s initially. The upgraded system could accommodate up to 320 Gbit/s with potential to go even further beyond.

The cable was decommissioned in December 2020.
