= Grace Hopper (submarine communications cable) =

Transatlantic communications cable connecting the US to UK and Spain

- Owners: Google
- Landing points: 1. (United Kingdom) Bude, Cornwall (50°50′7.8″N 4°33′9″W); 2. (United States) New York; 3. (Spain) Bilbao
- Total length: 6,250 km + 6,300 km
- Design capacity: 352 Tbit/s
- Technology: Fibre Optic
- Date of first use: September 27 2022; 2 years ago

Grace Hopper is a private transatlantic communications cable that connects the United States of America (New York) with the UK (Bude) and Spain (Bilbao). It was announced by Google in 2020 and scheduled to go live in 2022. The US to UK (Bude) leg went live on 27 September 2022.

== History ==
In July 2020, Google announced that it would be investing in a new private subsea cable — Grace Hopper — its fourth private subsea cable after Curie (which was completed in 2019), Dunant, and Equiano. The Grace Hopper cable, which links America with the UK and Spain was named after the American pioneering computer scientist Grace Brewster Murray Hopper, who was known for developing an early compiler that was important in the development of COBOL. Google said it was: "thrilled to honor Grace Hopper’s legacy of innovation by investing in the future of transatlantic communications with a state-of-the-art fiber optic cable".

Google stated that the cable would provide better resilience for its network and marked its first investment in a private subsea cable route to the UK, and its first route to Spain. The cable, which went live in 2022, integrated the new Google Cloud region in Madrid more tightly into Google's global infrastructure. Google's Jayne Stowell also has stated that another motivation for the investment is that many of the existing transatlantic cables are aging and need to be upgraded. “We need to be able to proactively manage the capacity availability, quality, latency, routing, technology and scalability of our network to provide constant, uninterruptible and high quality of network to Google services like Meet, Gmail and Google Cloud,” she said. Telecoms industry analysts have said that the main purpose of Google's subsea cable investments in cables such as Grace Hopper are twofold: to support and control quality of service and to reduce costs.

== Specifications ==
The Grace Hopper cable consists of 16 fiber pairs (32 fibers) of 22 Tbit/s each (352 Tbit/s total) and optical switching that increases its reliability and also enable Google to more easily move traffic around during outages. This technology was developed in co-operation with SubCom, formerly a TE Connectivity company, who built the cable and which also worked with Google on the Dunant and Curie cables.

The cable route comprises a 6,250 km stretch from New York to Widemouth Bay, Cornwall and a 6,300 km route between New York and Bilbao.

Owing to works managed by Telxius, the cable landed in Sopelana (near Bilbao) on 10 September 2021. It later landed near GCHQ Bude on 14 September 2021, with the location chosen as it was "an ideal, nicely protected beach and adjacent to a lot of the terrestrial infrastructure needed".

== See also ==
- Dark fibre
- Submarine communications cable
- Transatlantic communications cable
