= TAT-7 =

Seventh transatlantic telephone cable, operated 1983 to 1994

TAT-7 was the seventh transatlantic telephone cable, in operation from 1983 to 1994, initially carrying 4,000 3 kHz telephone circuits between New Jersey, United States and Porthcurno in southwest England. It was owned by AT&T, British Telecom and France Telecom, and was the last copper cable to be laid across the Atlantic.

Although optical fiber had been invented in 1970, this cable was still using coaxial cable technology.
