= HMS Halcyon =

Five ships of the Royal Navy have been named HMS Halcyon. The term Halcyon originates from the Greek myth of Alcyone and means golden or marked by peace and prosperity.

- The first HMS Halcyon was the French 16-gun brig-sloop Alcyon, which HMS Narcissus captured in 1803; Halcyon was broken up 1812.
- The second HMS Halcyon (1813) was an 18-gun Cruizer-class brig-sloop launched in 1813 and wrecked the following year in Jamaica.
- The third HMS Halcyon (1894) was a Dryad-class torpedo gunboat in service from 1894 to 1919.
- The fourth HMS Halcyon (1916) was a paddle minesweeper in service from 1916 to 1921.
- The fifth HMS Halcyon (J42) was a Halcyon-class minesweeper. She was launched in 1933 and sold for scrapping in 1950.
