= TAT-1 =

First trans-Atlantic telephone cable

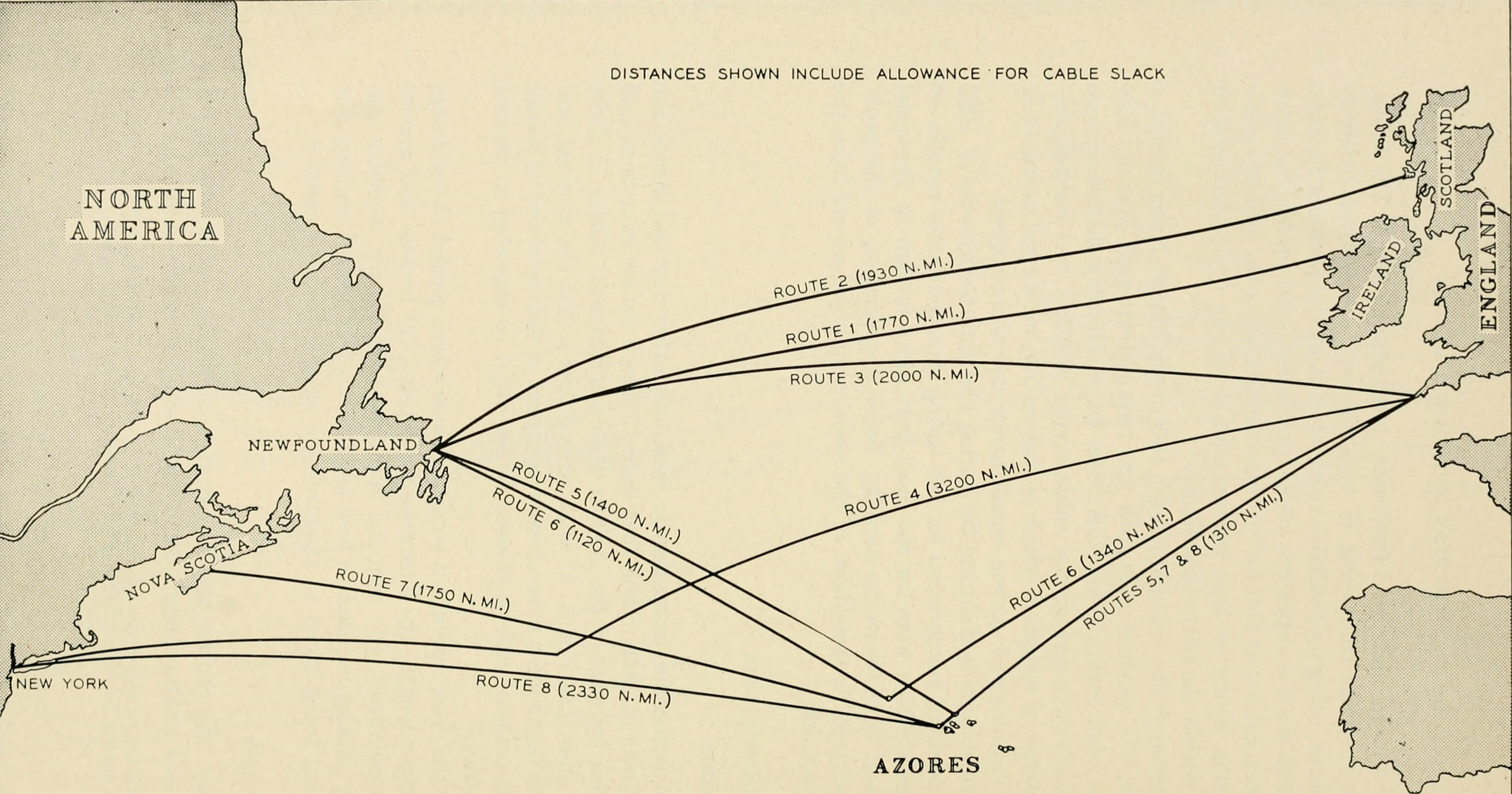
Tentative cable routes

TAT-1 (Transatlantic No. 1) was the first submarine transatlantic telephone cable system. It was laid between Kerrera, Oban, Scotland, and Clarenville, Newfoundland. Two cables were laid between 1955 and 1956 with one cable for each direction. It was inaugurated on September 25, 1956. The cable was able to carry 35 simultaneous telephone calls. A 36th channel was used to carry up to 22 telegraph lines.

== History ==
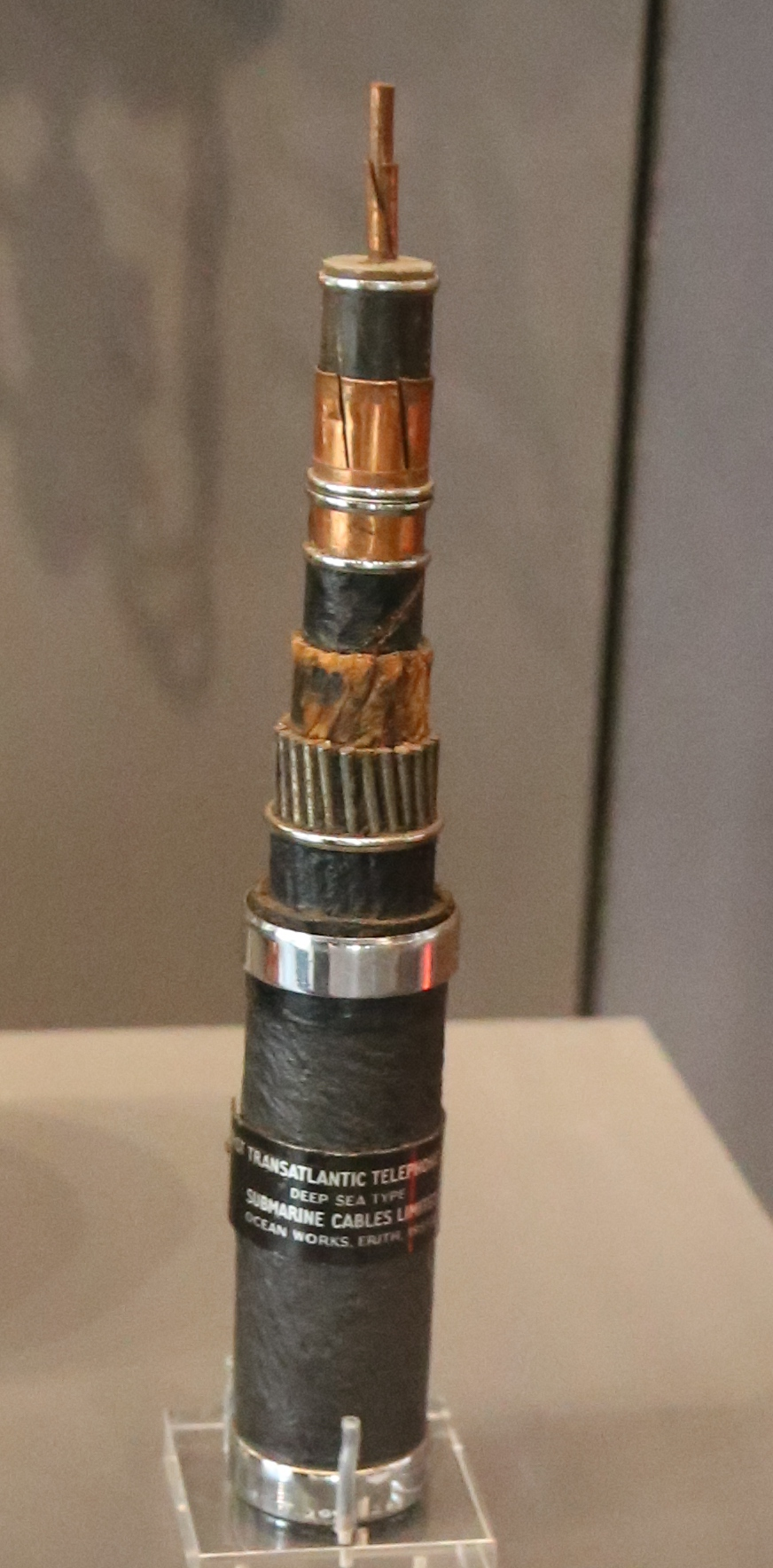
A section of TAT 1 cable with the layers successively stripped back

The first transatlantic telegraph cable had been laid in 1858 (see Cyrus West Field). It only operated for a month, but was replaced with a successful connection in 1866. A radio-based transatlantic telephone service was started in 1927, charging £9 (about US$45, or roughly $550 in 2010 dollars) for three minutes and handling around 300,000 calls a year. Although a telephone cable was discussed at that time, it was not practical until a number of technological advances arrived in the 1940s.

The developments that made TAT-1 possible were coaxial cable, polyethylene insulation (replacing gutta-percha), very reliable vacuum tubes for the submerged repeaters, and a general improvement in carrier equipment. Transistors were not used, being a recent invention of unknown longevity.

The agreement to make the connection was announced by the Postmaster General on December 1, 1953. The project was a joint one between the General Post Office of the UK, the American Telephone and Telegraph company, and the Canadian Overseas Telecommunications Corporation. The share split in the scheme was 40% British, 50% American, and 10% Canadian. The total cost was about £120 million.

There were to be two main cables, one for each direction of transmission. Each cable was produced and laid in three sections, two shallow-water armored sections, and one continuous central section 1,500 nautical miles (2,800 km) long. The electronic repeaters were designed by the Bell Telephone Laboratories of the United States and they were inserted into the cable at 37-nautical-mile (69 km) intervals – for a total of 51 repeaters in the central section. The armored cables were manufactured southeast of London, at a factory in Erith, Kent, owned by Submarine Cables Ltd. (owned jointly by Siemens Brothers & Co, Ltd, and The Telegraph Construction & Maintenance Company, Ltd).

The cables were laid over the summers of 1955 and 1956, with the majority of the work done by the cable ship HMTS Monarch. At the land-end in Gallanach Bay near Oban, Scotland, the cable was connected to coaxial (and then 24-circuit carrier lines) carrying the transatlantic circuits via Glasgow and Inverness to the International Exchange at Faraday Building in London. At the cable landing point in Newfoundland the cable joined at Clarenville, then crossed the 300-mile (480 km) Cabot Strait by another submarine cable to Sydney Mines, Nova Scotia. From there the communications traffic was routed to the US border by a microwave radio relay link, and in Brunswick, Maine, the route joined the main US network and branched to Montreal to connect with the Canadian network.

Opened on September 25, 1956, TAT-1 carried 588 London–US calls and 119 London–Canada calls in the first 24 hours of public service.

The original 36 channels were 4 kHz bandwidth. The increase to 48 channels was accomplished by narrowing the bandwidth to 3 kHz. Later, an additional three channels were added by use of C carrier equipment. Time-assignment speech interpolation (TASI) was implemented on the TAT-1 cable in June 1960 and effectively increased the cable's capacity from 37 (out of 51 available channels) to 72 speech circuits.

TAT-1 carried the Moscow–Washington hotline between the American and Soviet heads of state, although using a teleprinter rather than voice calls as written communications were regarded as less likely to be misinterpreted. The link became operational on 13 July 1963 and was principally motivated as a result of the Cuban Missile Crisis where it took the US, for example, nearly 12 hours to receive and decode the initial settlement message that contained approx. 3,000 words. By the time the message was decoded and interpreted, and an answer had been prepared, another, more aggressive message had been received.

In May 1957, TAT-1 was used to transmit a concert by the singer and civil rights activist Paul Robeson, performing in New York, to St Pancras Town Hall in London. Due to McCarthyism, Robeson's passport had been withdrawn by the United States authorities in 1950. Unable to accept numerous invitations to perform abroad, he stated, "We have to learn the hard way that there is another way to sing." The 15 minute connection, which required a music-quality circuit, cost £300 (~£6,500 as of 2015). Robeson performed this way again in October 1957 when he linked up to the Grand Pavilion, Porthcawl, Wales, fulfilling an invitation to the eisteddfod there. A 10-inch record featuring selections from the event, entitled Transatlantic Exchange, was issued by South Wales area of the National Union of Mineworkers as a fundraiser and protest at Robeson's treatment.

After the success of TAT-1, a number of other TAT cables were laid, and TAT-1 was retired in 1978.

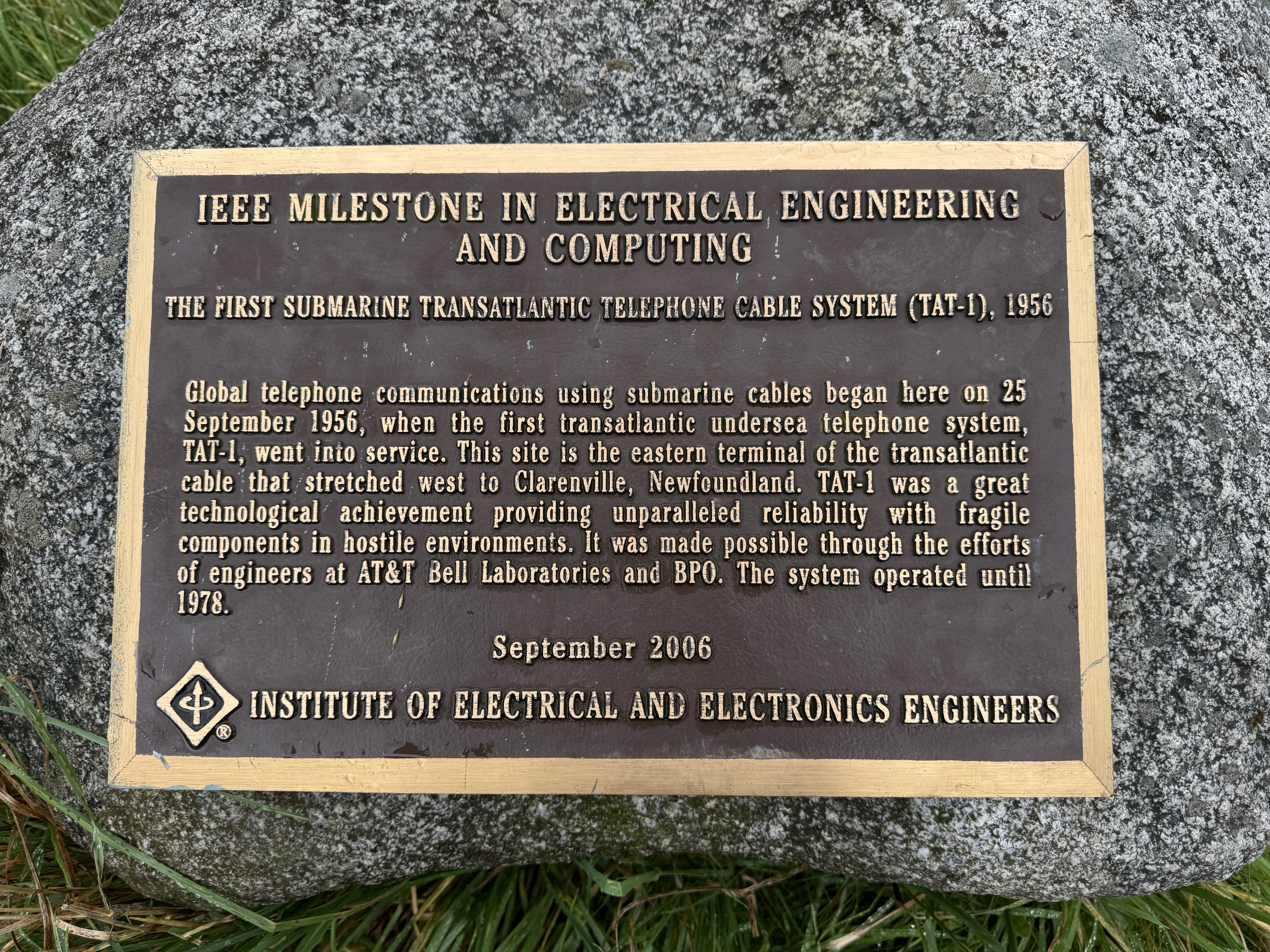
IEEE Milestone plaque for the first submarine transatlantic telephone cable system

The TAT-1 was named an IEEE milestone in 2006.

== See also ==
- Transatlantic telephone cable
- HAW-1
