= TAT-8 =

Transatlantic communications cable

TAT-8 was the 8th transatlantic communications cable and first transatlantic fiber-optic cable, carrying 280 Mbit/s (40,000 telephone circuits) between the United States, United Kingdom and France. It was constructed in 1988 by a consortium of companies led by AT&T Corporation, France Télécom, and British Telecom. AT&T Bell Laboratories developed the technologies used in the cable. The system was made possible by opto-electric-opto regenerators acting as repeaters with advantages over the electrical repeaters of former cables. They were less costly and could be at greater spacing with less need for associated hardware and software. It was able to serve the three countries with a single transatlantic crossing with the use of an innovative branching unit located underwater on the continental shelf off the coast of Great Britain. The cable lands in Tuckerton, New Jersey, USA, Widemouth Bay, England, UK, and Penmarch, France.

The system was built at an initial cost of US$335 million in 1988 and was retired from service in 2002. Capacity was reached in eighteen months despite optimistic predictions that the capacity would not be filled for a decade and some that it would never be filled and no other cables would be needed.

In 2025, the cable began the recovery process of being pulled up and sent for recycling by Subsea Environmental Services. Subsea Environmental Services chartered the MV Maasvliet vessel designed for cable recovery use. By August 2025, the ship had recovered 1,012 kilometers of cable from the defunct fiber optic undersea communications cable. The cable was being transported for offloading at Leixoes port in Portugal, and recycling done in South Africa by Mertech Marine.

== History ==
This was the first transatlantic cable to use optical fibers, a revolution in telecommunications. The system contained two working pairs of optical fibers; a third fiber pair (in the AT&T segment only) was reserved as a span-wise spare. The signal on each optical fiber was modulated at 295.6 Mbit/s (carrying 280 Mbit/s of traffic) and fully regenerated in equipment placed in pressure housings separated by about 40 km of cable.

There were several problems with the early reliability of this cable during its first two years of operation. The cable was buried on the continental shelf on the European and the American side of the ocean. The burial was largely effective, and the cable issues were primarily related to manufacturing defects. AT&T laid a trial optical cable in the Canary Islands in 1985. This cable did not have an electrical screen and was attacked by sharks. It was never proved whether these attacks were due to the sharks sensing the electrical radiation from the cable or the vibration of the cable moving on the sea floor where it might have been suspended, or a combination of both. TAT-8 did not have the screen conductor over the vast majority of its length, as the threat of shark attack was deemed to be small over the majority of the route. Because the Canary Island cable was the first fiber-optic cable and not a coaxial cable, the electrical interference shielding for the high voltage supply lines was removed. This removal did not affect the fiber, but it did cause feeding frenzies in sharks that swam nearby. The sharks would then attack the cable until the voltage lines killed them. This caused numerous, prolonged outages. Eventually, a shark shielding was developed for the cable and was available for TAT-8. PTAT-1, the next cable to go in the Atlantic was put in with the shark shielding across its entire length; the added reliability provided by this shield has not been fully evaluated.

The system was manufactured by a consortium of three established submarine system suppliers: AT&T, Standard Telephones and Cables and Alcatel. The idea was that each manufacturer would manufacture part of the system, so French technology procured by France Télécom would land in France, US technology in America procured by AT&T and British technology procured by BT in the UK. The systems were designed to interoperate although the regenerator supervisory systems were all proprietary. The transition between one supplier to another supplier's regenerators was achieved using a "mid-span meet". AT&T was appointed the integration coordinator and integration trials were held in Freehold, New Jersey.

== Impact ==
In 1989, with the new available capacity due to the TAT-8 cable, IBM agreed to fund a dedicated T1 link between Cornell University and CERN, which was completed in February 1990. It greatly increased the connectivity between the American and European portions of the early Internet. This allowed Tim Berners-Lee a high-speed, direct and open connection to the NSFNET, which greatly aided the first demonstrations of the World Wide Web ten months later. It was also crucial, along with the collapse of the Warsaw Pact at the same time, to the acceptance of TCP/IP protocols in Europe.
