= Widemouth Creek =

Stream in West Virginia, U.S.

Coordinates: 37°22′22″N 81°13′26″W

Widemouth Creek is a stream in the U.S. state of West Virginia.

Widemouth Creek was named for the fact the creek has a relatively wide mouth.

== See also ==
- List of rivers of West Virginia
