= AC-2 =

Yellow / AC-2
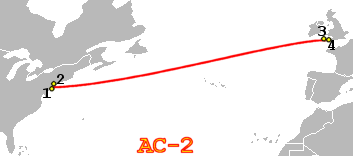
- Owners: Lumen
- Landing points: 1. Bellport / Brookhaven, New York; 2. Bude, Cornwall
- Total length: c. 6,400 km
- Topology: unknown
- Design capacity: 640 Gbit/s
- Currently lit capacity: 320 Gbit/s
- Technology: Fiber optics
- Date of first use: November 2000

Yellow / AC-2 (Atlantic Crossing 2) is a submarine telecommunications cable system linking the United States and the United Kingdom. The cable is wholly owned by Lumen (formerly Level 3 Communications) in the US following its acquisition of Global Crossing. The original owners, which each owned two of the fibre pairs, gave this cable system different names, so it is known as both Yellow (after the Beatles song Yellow Submarine) and AC-2. It has a capacity of 320 Gbit/s as of January 2007, upgradeable to 640 Gbit/s.

It has landing points in:

1. Bellport/Brookhaven, New York, United States
2. Bude, Cornwall, United Kingdom
