= TAT-2 =

Transatlantic communications cable

TAT-2 was AT&T Corporation's second transatlantic telephone cable. It was in operation from 1959 to 1982, initially carrying 48 telephone circuits on two cables between Penmarch, France and Clarenville, Newfoundland. It was operated by AT&T and the national operators of Germany and France.
