= ICPC =

ICPC may refer to:

== Organisations ==
- Independent Corrupt Practices Commission, Nigeria
- International Cable Protection Committee, UK
- International Centre for the Prevention of Crime, Montreal, Canada
- International Criminal Police Commission, former name of Interpol

== Other uses ==
- International Collegiate Programming Contest, annual competition
- International Classification of Primary Care, a medical classification method
- Interstate Compact on the Placement of Children, a contract among all 50 U.S. states, the District of Columbia and the Virgin Islands
