= CIPC =

CIPC is an abbreviation which may refer to:

- CIPC-FM, radio station
- Companies and Intellectual Property Commission, South African government agency
- Chlorpropham, a plant growth regulator also known as CIPC
- Cleveland International Piano Competition, an international classical music competition
- International Centre for the Prevention of Crime, a global non-profit organization
