= Massimo Ellul =

Maltese businessman

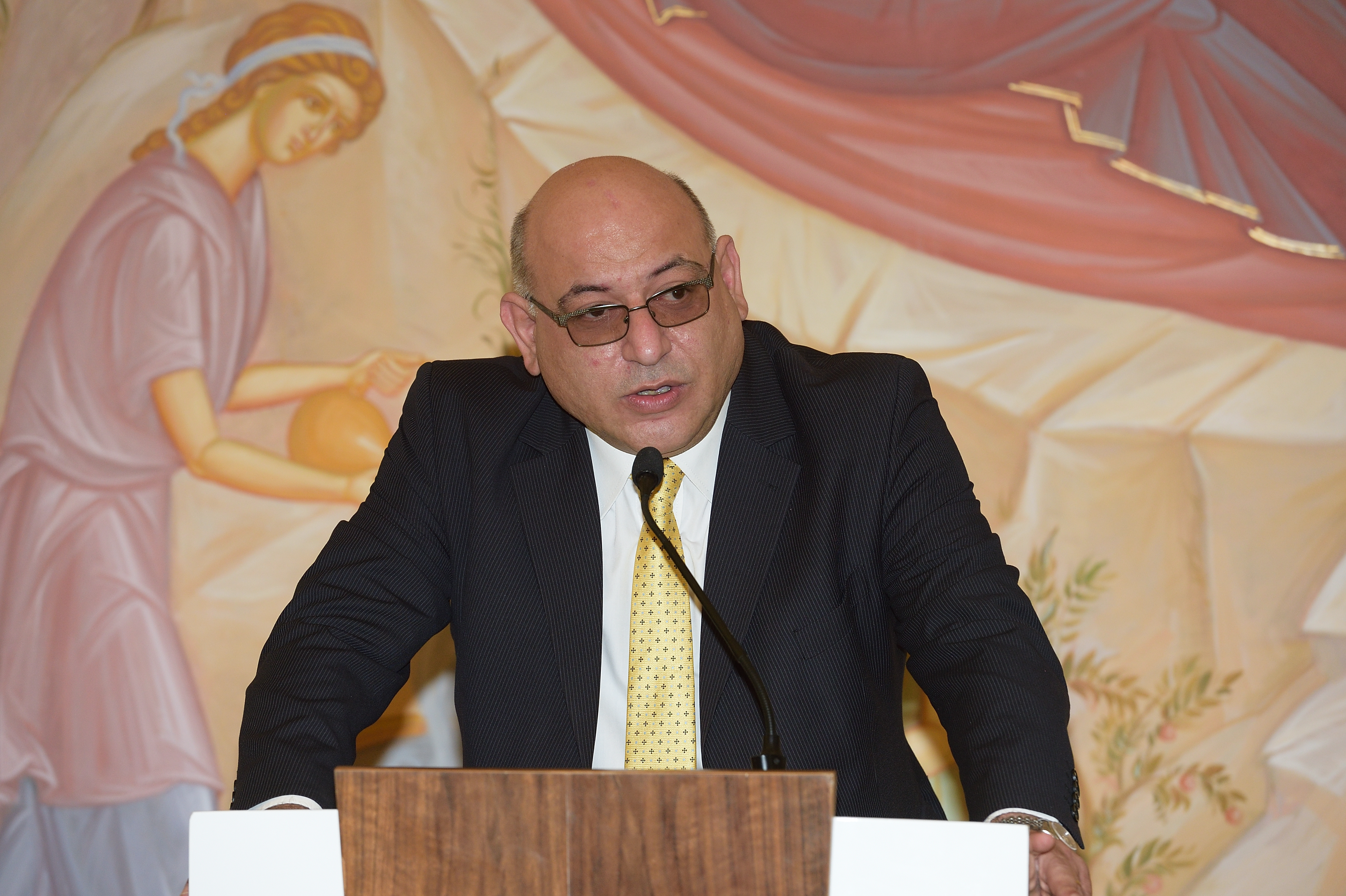
- Born: December 20, 1970 (age 55); Attard, Malta
- Other name: Max
- Occupations: Businessman, author

Massimo Ellul is a Maltese entrepreneur and contributor to the voluntary sector. He is a Fellow of the Royal Society of Arts Ellul is the chief executive of a group of companies in the marketing and management consultancy field operating in Malta, Manchester, Edinburgh, Sicily and Dubai.

== Education ==
Ellul pursued studies in marketing and management in Malta, the UK and the US and is an alumnus of the Judge Business School of the University of Cambridge.

Ellul has authored and had published a number of books in Malta and the US, with subjects varying from medieval history to current affairs and social policy. He has been regularly contributing to various Maltese newspapers and online journals since the nineties in both the Maltese and English language.

== Career ==
=== Business career ===
His business career began in the early 1990s while studying at Cambridge, he earned a diploma in marketing and continued academic work in the field up to postdoctoral level.

He was also an elected official of the Executive Committee of the European Forum for Urban Security under the aegis of the Council of Europe and represents Malta in the European Disability Forum and the European Union of Supported Employment. In Scotland, Ellul was very much involved with the Friends of Rosslyn [Chapel], and has lectured extensively in the region. He was admitted as Liveryman of the Worshipful Company of Marketors of the City of London and in 2005 was granted the Freedom of the City of London.

In 2002, Ellul became Chancellor of the Grand Priory of the Mediterranean within the Hospitaller Order of Saint Lazarus of Jerusalem and later served as Chairman of the Saint Lazarus Foundation. He was appointed Grand Chancellor of the Order in 2008. In addition, he has held positions as Honorary Secretary of the Malta Federation of Organizations and Persons with Disability (MFOPD) and Vice President of the Malta Association of Supported Employment. Ellul has been awarded a number of accolades from various countries for his philanthropic and Hospitaller initiatives worldwide. These include accolades from US President Barak Obama, from King Kigeli V of Rwanda and from the Rajah of Kupang (Indonesia).

Ellul was also the Chairman of the annual Malta International Folk Festival, and sits on/consults the board of directors of various firms and organisations in Malta, England, Scotland, Sicily and Dubai.

He is particularly active in Sicily where he has aided and assisted both Sicilian and Maltese governmental authorities to work in synergy in the touristic, cultural, economic and cultural sectors. This included a number of twinning and joint venture agreements with Enna, Paterno, Agira, Acireale and other cities.

As consultant for the Malta Food Agency and the Chamber of Small and Medium Enterprises in Sicily, Ellul was tasked to ensure that the annual international Taormina Food Expo would be jointly organized between the Italian and Maltese authorities, an initiative which has been annually successful since 2023.

=== Political career ===
Ellul was Assistant Secretary General of the Malta Labour Party and later occupied the post of Assistant Education Secretary of the Party, President of the Students' Movement and Secretary of the Youth Commission of the Party. He was a Parliamentary Candidate with the Malta Labour Party in the 1996 and 1998 general elections
