= Transatlantic cables incident =

1959 American boarding of a Soviet ship

- Part of the Cold War
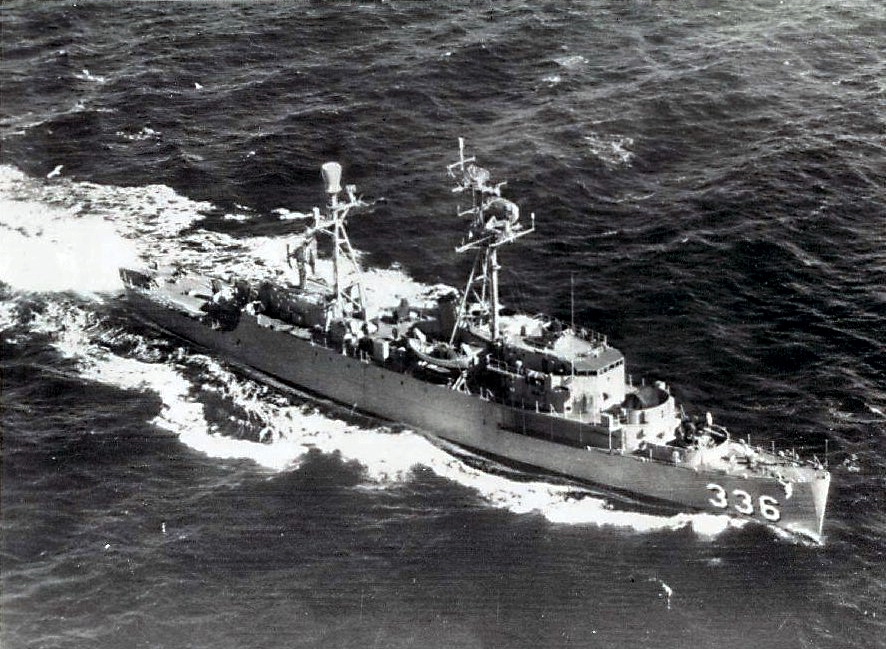
- USS Roy O. Hale pictured underway on February 26, 1959, while engaged in a Submarine Cables Convention police action
Date	February 26, 1959
Location	North Atlantic
Result	Soviet trawler compelled to stop and receive U.S. Navy boarders

Belligerents
United States	USSR

Commanders and leaders
LCDR Ernest J. Korte	

Units involved
USS Roy O. Hale; An AT&T survey aircraft	MV Novorossiysk

Strength
about 216 (Note: The customary complement of Edsall-class destroyers was 216)	54

In 1959, the Soviet vessel MV Novorossiysk was boarded by personnel from the United States warship USS Roy O. Hale in response to a complaint filed by AT&T and Western Union over breakages in their undersea telecommunications cables. It was the first and, until 2024, only enforcement action taken under the Convention for the Protection of Submarine Telegraph Cables of 1884.

Accidental damage to undersea cables by fishing vessels was a common occurrence at the time and a U.S. Navy investigation concluded that Novorossiysk may have unintentionally cut the cables. The Soviet Union denounced the U.S. boarding action as "provocative".

== Background ==
Undersea telecommunications cables have been the object of sabotage since the Spanish–American War. During the Cold War, the Soviet Union outfitted a number of ships in its fishing and merchant fleets with intelligence-gathering and marine sabotage equipment. This operational provisioning of Soviet merchantmen was known to the United States Navy and, for its part, the United States interfered with the Soviet Union's own undersea cables.

According to the International Cable Protection Committee, it is common for fishing vessels to unintentionally break undersea cables. An AT&T technician, interviewed in 1959 by the Associated Press, said the company's undersea cables were at the time being regularly cut by accident each summer by Portuguese and Norwegian fishing vessels trawling for cod in the North Atlantic.

=== Convention for the Protection of Submarine Telegraph Cables ===
The 1884 Convention for the Protection of Submarine Telegraph Cables was the first international compact to deal with underwater cables. It proscribes breakage or damage of such cables — except by belligerents engaged in open war — and permits the naval forces of state parties to engage in certain enforcement actions against suspected offenders.

Article 10 of the convention provides that:

Evidence of violations of this convention may be obtained by all methods of securing proof that are allowed by the laws of the country of the court before which a case has been brought. When the officers commanding the vessels of war or the vessels specially commissioned for that purpose, of one of the High Contracting Parties, shall have reason to believe that an infraction of the measures provided for by this Convention has been committed by a vessel other than a vessel of war, they may require the captain or master to exhibit the official documents furnishing evidence of the nationality of the said vessel.

== The incident ==
Between February 21 and February 25, 1959, several undersea telecommunications cables in the North Atlantic suffered a total of 12 breaks, of which nine were "tension breaks" and three were "man-made cuts severing the cables". The cables were owned by AT&T and Western Union, who reported the breaks to the U.S. Government. AT&T also sent a surveillance aircraft to the area, which sighted the Soviet fishing trawler MV Novorossiysk. The AT&T aircraft air dropped a note to the deck of the Novorossiysk demanding she stop trawling pending investigation.

Roy O. Hale signaled by flag to Novorossiysk to come to a stop and ready herself for boarding. Pictured is the Lima flag, indicating "heave to" in the International Code of Signals.

In response to the report from AT&T and Western Union, the United States Navy dispatched USS Roy O. Hale to the area. On February 26, 1959, Roy O. Hale came in flaghoist range of Novorossiysk in international waters approximately 120 miles (190 km) from the coast of Newfoundland. Taking note that the Soviet ship was the only vessel in the immediate vicinity of the cable breaks, Roy O. Hale raised signal flags indicating "heave to, we are sending a boat". The boarding of the Soviet vessel was ordered by U.S. Navy Admiral William Martin, who was not aboard Roy O. Hale at the time of the action.

Novorossiysk complied with the instruction and a five-man, unarmed party commanded by Roy O. Hale's executive officer Donald M. Sheely boarded the Soviet ship. The American and Soviet mariners communicated with each other in French. According to the U.S. Government, after collecting evidence for about one hour, the boarding party returned to its vessel and Novorossiysk departed the area.

=== United States account of investigation ===
According to the United States Government, in a note verbale addressed to the Soviet foreign ministry after the incident, the U.S. Navy boarding party inspected Novorossiysk's log books and catch. It noted that the ship had recently caught bottomfish, which might be consistent with the dragging of fishing nets across the ocean floor and that the man-made cutting of the cables could be explained by deck crew severing them to disentangle the cables from their nets before discarding them back into the ocean.

The United States noted the captain of Novorossiysk was "friendly and cooperative" and concluded that any breakage of the cables was probably unintentional.

=== Soviet response ===
The Soviet Union denounced the U.S. action against Novorossiysk, describing it as "provocative".

== Historical context ==
The transatlantic cables incident was the first enforcement action taken under the Submarine Cables Convention. On about November 20, 2024, in what was cited as the second enforcement action under the convention, a Royal Danish Navy warship detained the Chinese merchant vessel Yi Peng 3 while investigating the damaging of two undersea fiber optic cables in the Baltic Sea.
