= Submarine communications cable =

Transoceanic communication line placed on the seabed

A cross section of the shore-end of a modern submarine communications cable. 1 – Polyethylene 2 – Mylar tape 3 – Stranded steel wires 4 – Aluminium water barrier 5 – Polycarbonate 6 – Copper or aluminium tube 7 – Petroleum jelly 8 – Optical fibers

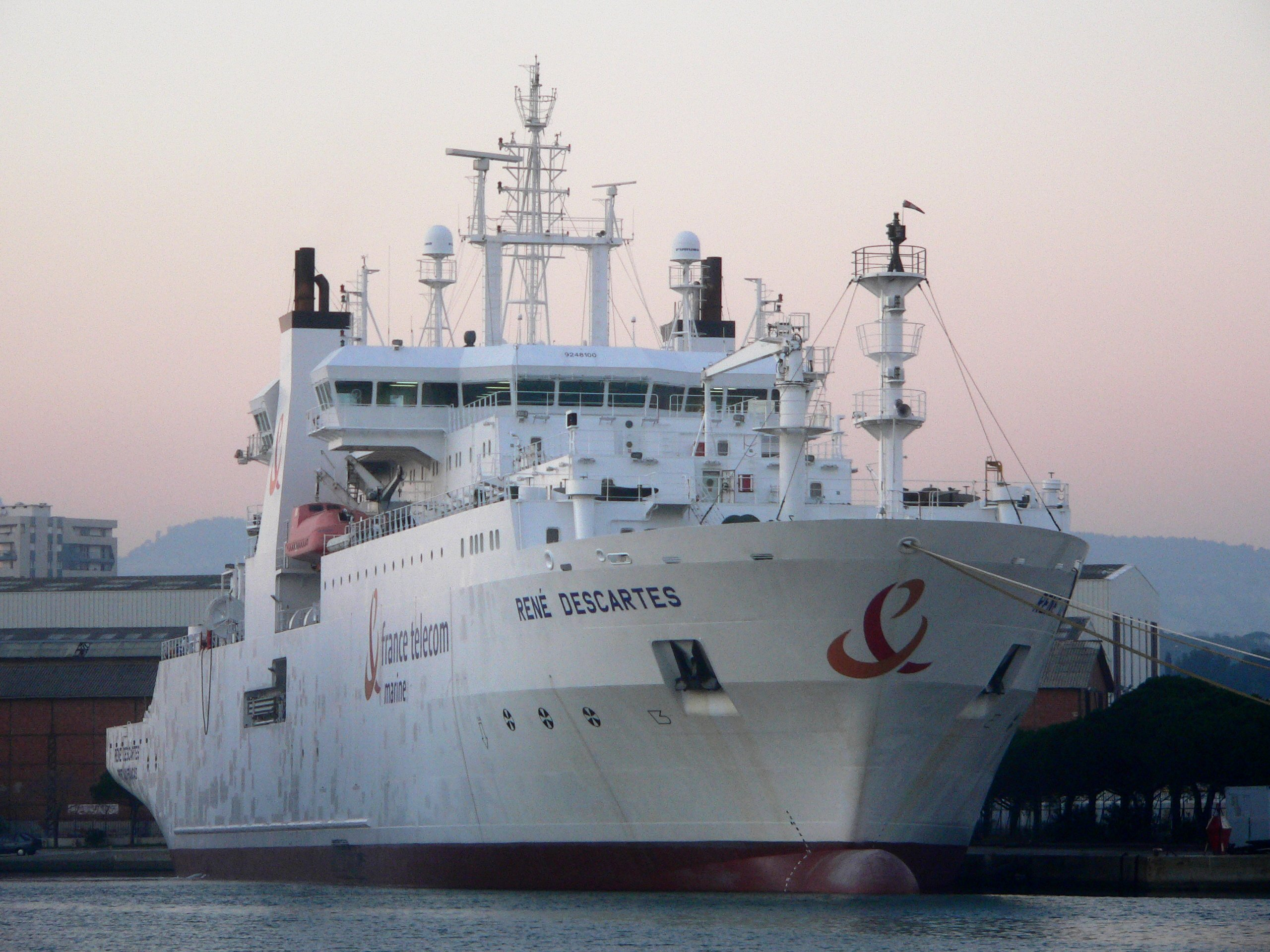
Submarine cables are laid using special cable layer ships, such as the modern René Descartes, operated by Orange Marine.

A submarine communications cable is a cable laid on the seabed between land-based stations to carry telecommunication signals across stretches of ocean and sea.

The first submarine communications cables were laid beginning in the 1850s and carried telegraphy traffic, establishing the first instant telecommunications links between continents, such as the first transatlantic telegraph cable which became operational on 16 August 1858. By 1872 all the continents with the exception of Antarctica had been linked by submarine telecommunications cables. Although plans have been made to construct one, as of February 2026, Antarctica remains without a submarine cable link to the other continents.

Subsequent generations of cables carried telephone traffic, then data communications traffic. These early cables used copper wires in their cores, but modern cables use optical fiber technology to carry digital data, which includes telephone, internet and private data traffic. Modern cables are typically about 25 mm (1 in) in diameter and weigh around 1.4 tonnes per kilometre (2.5 short tons per mile; 2.2 long tons per mile) for the deep-sea sections which comprise the majority of the run, although larger and heavier cables are used for shallow-water sections near shore.

== Early history: telegraph and coaxial cables ==
=== First successful trials ===
After William Cooke and Charles Wheatstone had introduced their working telegraph in 1839, the idea of a submarine line across the Atlantic Ocean began to be thought of as a possible triumph of the future. Samuel Morse proclaimed his faith in it as early as 1840, and in 1842 he submerged a wire, insulated with tarred hemp and India rubber, in the water of New York Harbor, and telegraphed through it. The following autumn, Wheatstone performed a similar experiment in Swansea Bay. A good insulator to cover the wire and prevent the electric current from leaking into the water was necessary for the success of a long submarine line. India rubber had been tried by Moritz von Jacobi, the Prussian electrical engineer, as far back as the early 19th century.

Another insulating gum which could be melted by heat and readily applied to wire made its appearance in 1842. Gutta-percha, the adhesive juice of the Palaquium gutta tree, was introduced to Europe by William Montgomerie, a Scottish surgeon in the service of the British East India Company. Twenty years earlier, Montgomerie had seen whips made of gutta-percha in Singapore, and he believed that it would be useful in the fabrication of surgical apparatus. Michael Faraday and Wheatstone soon discovered the merits of gutta-percha as an insulator, and in 1845 the latter suggested that it should be employed to cover the wire which was proposed to be laid from Dover to Calais. In 1847 William Siemens, then an officer in the army of Prussia, laid the first successful underwater cable using gutta-percha insulation across the Rhine between Deutz and Cologne. In 1849 Charles Vincent Walker, electrician to the South Eastern Railway, submerged 3 km (2 mi) of wire coated with gutta-percha off the coast from Folkestone, which was tested successfully.

=== First commercial cables ===
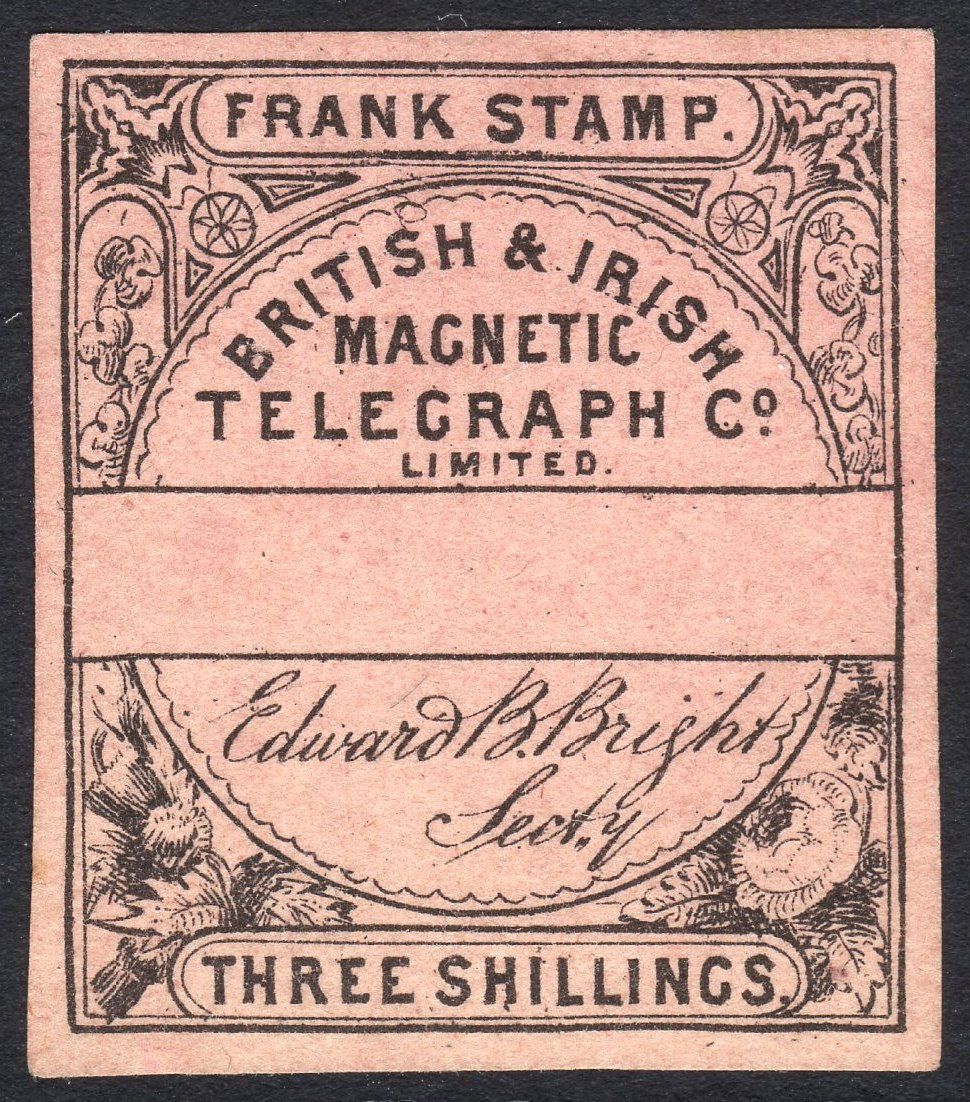
A telegraph stamp of the British & Irish Magnetic Telegraph Co. Limited (c. 1862)

In August 1850, having earlier obtained a concession from the French government, John Watkins Brett's English Channel Submarine Telegraph Company laid the first line across the English Channel using the converted tugboat Goliath. It was simply a copper wire coated with gutta-percha, without any other protection, and was not successful. However, the experiment served to secure renewal of the concession, and in September 1851 a protected core, or true, cable was laid by the reconstituted Submarine Telegraph Company from a government hulk, Blazer, which was towed across the Channel.

In 1853 more successful cables were laid, linking Great Britain with Ireland, Belgium, and the Netherlands, and crossing The Belts in Denmark. The British & Irish Magnetic Telegraph Company completed the first successful Irish link on May 23 between Portpatrick and Donaghadee using the collier William Hutt. The same ship was used for the link from Dover to Ostend in Belgium by the Submarine Telegraph Company. Meanwhile the Electric & International Telegraph Company completed two cables across the North Sea from Orford Ness to Scheveningen, the Netherlands. These cables were laid by the Monarch, a paddle steamer which later became the first vessel with permanent cable-laying equipment.

In 1858 the steamship Elba was used to lay a telegraph cable from Jersey to Guernsey, on to Alderney, and then to Weymouth, the cable being completed successfully in September of that year. Problems soon developed with eleven breaks occurring by 1860 due to storms, tidal and sand movements, and wear on rocks. A report to the Institution of Civil Engineers in 1860 set out the problems to assist in future cable-laying operations.

=== Crimean War (1853–1856) ===
In the Crimean War various forms of telegraphy played a major role; this was a first. At the start of the campaign there was a telegraph link at Bucharest connected to London. In the winter of 1854 the French extended the telegraph link to the Black Sea coast. In April 1855 the British laid an underwater cable from Varna to the Crimean peninsula so that news of the Crimean War could reach London in a handful of hours.

=== Transatlantic telegraph cable ===
The first attempt at laying a transatlantic telegraph cable was promoted by Cyrus West Field, who persuaded British industrialists to fund and lay one in 1858. However, the technology of the day was not capable of supporting the project; it was plagued with problems from the outset and was in operation for only a month. Subsequent attempts in 1865 and 1866 with the world's largest steamship, the SS Great Eastern, used a more advanced technology and produced the first successful transatlantic cable. Great Eastern later went on to lay the first cable to reach India from Aden, Yemen, in 1870.

=== British dominance of early cable ===
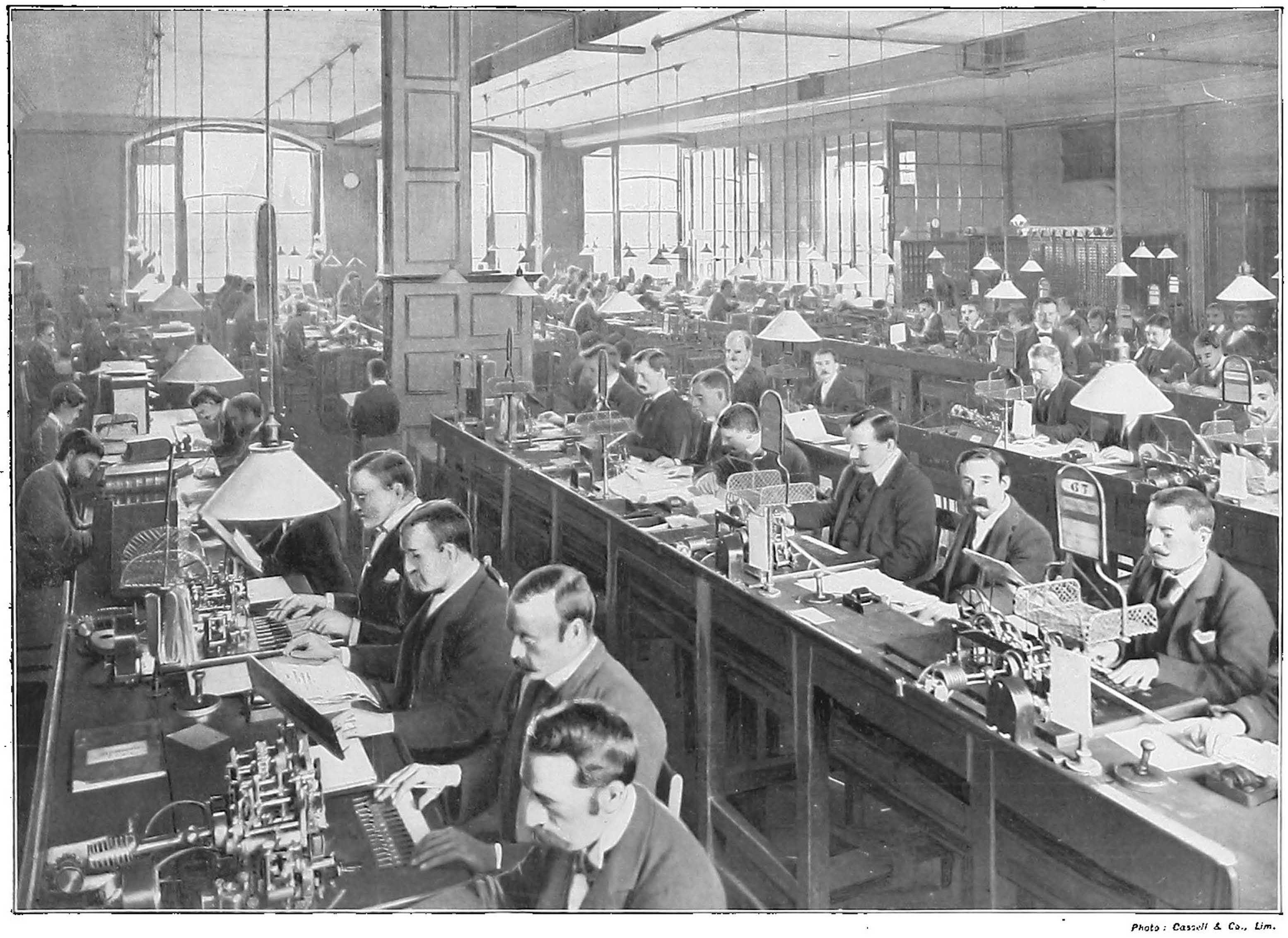
Operators in the submarine telegraph cable room at the GPO's Central Telegraph Office in London c. 1898

From the 1850s until 1911, British submarine cable systems dominated the most important market, the North Atlantic Ocean. The British had both supply-side and demand-side advantages. In terms of supply, Britain had entrepreneurs willing to put forth enormous amounts of capital necessary to build, lay, and maintain these cables. In terms of demand, Britain's vast colonial empire led to business for the cable companies from news agencies, trading and shipping companies, and the British government. Many of Britain's colonies had significant populations of European settlers, making their news of interest to the general public in the home country.

British officials believed that dependence on telegraph lines passing through non-British territory posed a security risk, as lines could be cut and messages interrupted during wartime. They sought the creation of a worldwide network within the empire, which became known as the All Red Line, and conversely prepared strategies for quickly interrupting enemy communications. Britain's very first action after declaring war on Germany in World War I was to have the cable ship Alert (not the CS Telconia as frequently reported) cut the five cables linking Germany with France, Spain, and the Azores, and through them, North America. Thereafter, the only way Germany could communicate was by wireless, and that meant that Room 40 could listen in.

The submarine cables were an economic benefit to trading companies because owners of ships could communicate with captains upon reaching their destinations and give directions as to where to pick up cargo next based on reported pricing and supply information. The British government had obvious uses for the cables in maintaining administrative communications with governors throughout its empire, as well as in engaging other nations diplomatically and communicating with its military units in wartime. The geographic location of British territory was also an advantage, as it included both Ireland on the east side of the Atlantic Ocean and Newfoundland in North America on the west side, making for the shortest route across the ocean and reducing costs significantly.

A few facts put this dominance of the industry in perspective. In 1896 there were 30 cable-laying ships in the world, 24 of which were owned by British companies. In 1892 British companies owned and operated two-thirds of the world's cables, and by 1923 their share was still 42.7 percent. During World War I, Britain's telegraph communications were almost completely uninterrupted, while it was able to quickly cut Germany's cables worldwide.

=== Cable to India, Singapore, East Asia and Australia ===
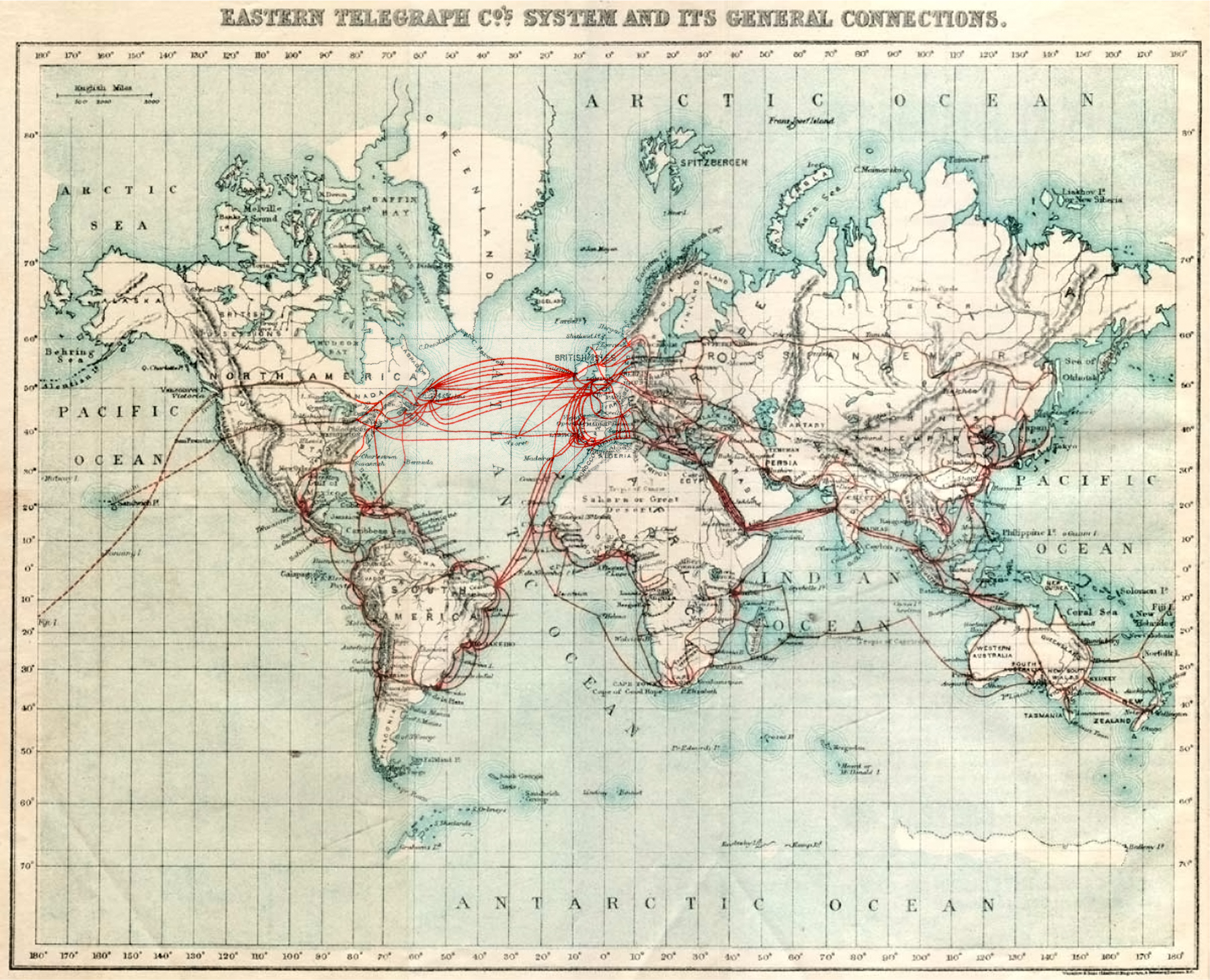
Eastern Telegraph Company network in 1901. Dotted lines across the Pacific indicate planned cables laid in 1902–03.

Throughout the 1860s and 1870s, British cable expanded eastward into the Mediterranean Sea and the Indian Ocean. An 1863 cable to Bombay (now Mumbai), India, provided a crucial link to Saudi Arabia. At the behest of the British Government in 1870, Bombay was linked to London via submarine cable in a combined operation by four cable companies. In 1872 these four companies were combined to form the mammoth, globe-spanning Eastern Telegraph Company, owned by John Pender. A spin-off sister company became the Eastern Extension, China and Australasia Telegraph Company, commonly known simply as "the Extension". That same year, Australia was linked by cable to Bombay via Singapore and China, and by 1876 the cable linked the British Empire from London to New Zealand.

=== Submarine cables across the Pacific, 1902–1991 ===
The first trans-Pacific cables providing telegraph service were completed in 1902 and 1903, linking the US mainland to Hawaii in 1902 and Guam to the Philippines in 1903. Canada, Australia, New Zealand and Fiji were also linked in 1902 with the trans-Pacific segment of the All Red Line. Japan was connected into the system in 1906. Service beyond Midway Atoll was abandoned in 1941 due to World War II, but the remainder stayed in operation until 1951 when the FCC gave permission to cease operations.

The first trans-Pacific telephone cable was laid from Hawaii to Japan in 1964, with an extension from Guam to The Philippines. Also in 1964, the Commonwealth Pacific Cable System (COMPAC), with 80 telephone channel capacity, opened for traffic from Sydney to Vancouver, and in 1967, the South East Asia Commonwealth (SEACOM) system, with 160 telephone channel capacity, opened for traffic. This system used microwave radio from Sydney to Cairns (Queensland), cable running from Cairns to Madang (Papua New Guinea), Guam, Hong Kong, Kota Kinabalu (capital of Sabah, Malaysia), Singapore, then overland by microwave radio to Kuala Lumpur. In 1991, the North Pacific Cable system was the first regenerative system (i.e., with repeaters) to completely cross the Pacific from the US mainland to Japan. The US portion of NPC was manufactured in Portland, Oregon, from 1989 to 1991 at STC Submarine Systems, and later Alcatel Submarine Networks. The system was laid by Cable & Wireless Marine on the CS Cable Venture.

=== Construction, 19–20th century ===
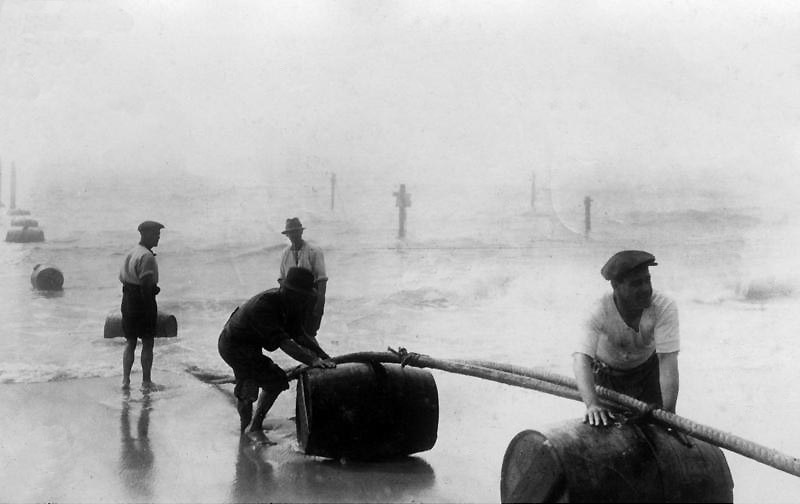
Landing of an Italy–US cable (4,704 nautical miles long), on Rockaway Beach, Queens, New York, January 1925

Transatlantic cables of the 19th century consisted of an outer layer of iron and later steel wire, wrapping India rubber, wrapping gutta-percha, which surrounded a multi-stranded copper wire at the core. The portions closest to each shore landing had additional protective armour wires. Gutta-percha, a natural polymer similar to rubber, had nearly ideal properties for insulating submarine cables, with the exception of a rather high dielectric constant which made cable capacitance high. William Thomas Henley had developed a machine in 1837 for covering wires with silk or cotton thread that he developed into a wire wrapping capability for submarine cable with a factory in 1857 that became W.T. Henley's Telegraph Works Co., Ltd. The India Rubber, Gutta Percha and Telegraph Works Company, established by the Silver family and giving that name to a section of London, furnished cores to Henley's as well as eventually making and laying finished cable. In 1870 William Hooper established Hooper's Telegraph Works to manufacture his patented vulcanized rubber core, at first to furnish other makers of finished cable, that began to compete with the gutta-percha cores. The company later expanded into complete cable manufacture and cable laying, including the building of the first cable ship specifically designed to lay transatlantic cables.

Gutta-percha and rubber were not replaced as a cable insulation until polyethylene was introduced in the 1930s. Even then, the material was only available to the military and the first submarine cable using it was not laid until 1945 during World War II across the English Channel. In the 1920s, the American military experimented with rubber-insulated cables as an alternative to gutta-percha, since American interests controlled significant supplies of rubber but did not have easy access to gutta-percha manufacturers. The 1926 development by John T. Blake of deproteinized rubber improved the impermeability of cables to water.

Many early cables suffered from attack by sea life. The insulation could be eaten, for instance, by species of Teredo (shipworm) and Xylophaga. Hemp laid between the steel wire armouring gave pests a route to eat their way in. Damaged armouring, which was not uncommon, also provided an entrance. Cases of sharks biting cables and attacks by sawfish have been recorded. In one case in 1873, a whale damaged the Persian Gulf Cable between Karachi and Gwadar. The whale was apparently attempting to use the cable to clean off barnacles at a point where the cable descended over a steep drop. The unfortunate whale got its tail entangled in loops of cable and drowned. The cable repair ship Amber Witch was only able to winch up the cable with difficulty, weighed down as it was with the dead whale's body.

=== Bandwidth problems ===
Early long-distance submarine telegraph cables exhibited formidable electrical problems. Unlike modern cables, the technology of the 19th century did not allow for in-line repeater amplifiers in the cable. Large voltages were used to attempt to overcome the electrical resistance of their tremendous length but the cables' distributed capacitance and inductance combined to distort the telegraph pulses in the line, reducing the cable's bandwidth, severely limiting the data rate for telegraph operation to 10–12 words per minute.

As early as 1816, Francis Ronalds had observed that electric signals were slowed in passing through an insulated wire or core laid underground, and outlined the cause to be induction, using the analogy of a long Leyden jar. The same effect was noticed by Latimer Clark (1853) on cores immersed in water, and particularly on the lengthy cable between England and The Hague. Michael Faraday showed that the effect was caused by capacitance between the wire and the earth (or water) surrounding it. Faraday had noticed that when a wire is charged from a battery (for example when pressing a telegraph key), the electric charge in the wire induces an opposite charge in the water as it travels along. In 1831, Faraday described this effect in what is now referred to as Faraday's law of induction. As the two charges attract each other, the exciting charge is retarded. The core acts as a capacitor distributed along the length of the cable which, coupled with the resistance and inductance of the cable, limits the speed at which a signal travels through the conductor of the cable.

Early cable designers failed to analyse these effects correctly. Famously, E.O.W. Whitehouse had dismissed the problems and insisted that a transatlantic cable was feasible. When he subsequently became chief electrician of the Atlantic Telegraph Company, he became involved in a public dispute with William Thomson. Whitehouse believed that, with enough voltage, any cable could be driven. Thomson believed that his law of squares showed that retardation could not be overcome by a higher voltage. His recommendation was a larger cable. Because of the excessive voltages recommended by Whitehouse, Cyrus West Field's first transatlantic cable never worked reliably, and eventually short circuited to the ocean when Whitehouse increased the voltage beyond the cable design limit.

Thomson designed a complex electric-field generator that minimized current by resonating the cable, and a sensitive light-beam mirror galvanometer for detecting the faint telegraph signals. Thomson became wealthy on the royalties of these, and several related inventions. Thomson was elevated to Lord Kelvin for his contributions in this area, chiefly an accurate mathematical model of the cable, which permitted design of the equipment for accurate telegraphy. The effects of atmospheric electricity and the geomagnetic field on submarine cables also motivated many of the early polar expeditions.

Thomson had produced a mathematical analysis of propagation of electrical signals into telegraph cables based on their capacitance and resistance, but since long submarine cables operated at slow rates, he did not include the effects of inductance. By the 1890s, Oliver Heaviside had produced the modern general form of the telegrapher's equations, which included the effects of inductance and which were essential to extending the theory of transmission lines to the higher frequencies required for high-speed data and voice.

=== World wars ===
Even before WWI began, British planners considered cutting enemy submarine communications cables. During WWII the dominance of radio for long-distance communication meant that cable-cutting was not as important.

=== Transatlantic telephony ===
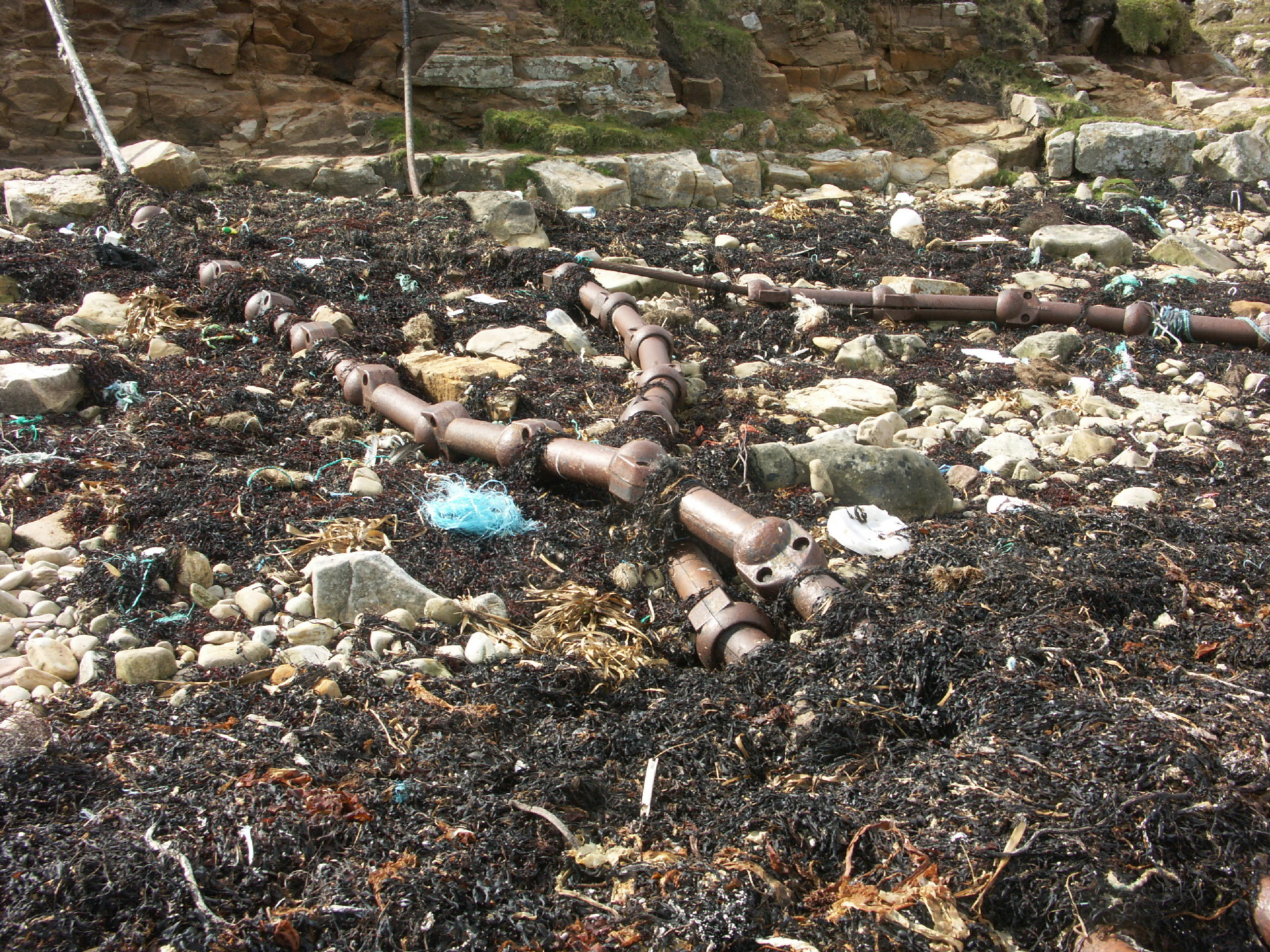
Submarine communication cables crossing the Scottish shore at Scad Head on Hoy, Orkney

While laying a transatlantic telephone cable was seriously considered from the 1920s, the technology required for economically feasible telecommunications was not developed until the 1940s. A first attempt to lay a "pupinized" telephone cable—one with loading coils added at regular intervals—failed in the early 1930s due to the Great Depression.

TAT-1 (Transatlantic No. 1) was the first transatlantic telephone cable system. Between 1955 and 1956, cable was laid between Gallanach Bay, near Oban, Scotland and Clarenville, Newfoundland and Labrador, in Canada. It was inaugurated on September 25, 1956, initially carrying 36 telephone channels.

In the 1960s, transoceanic cables were coaxial cables that transmitted frequency-multiplexed voiceband signals. A high-voltage direct current on the inner conductor powered repeaters (two-way amplifiers placed at intervals along the cable). The first-generation repeaters remain among the most reliable vacuum tube amplifiers ever designed. Later ones were transistorized. Many of these cables are still usable, but have been abandoned because their capacity is too small to be commercially viable. Some have been used as scientific instruments to measure earthquake waves and other geomagnetic events.

=== Other uses ===
In 1942, Siemens Brothers of New Charlton, London, in conjunction with the United Kingdom National Physical Laboratory, adapted submarine communications cable technology to create the world's first submarine oil pipeline in Operation Pluto during World War II.

Active fiber-optic cables may be useful in detecting seismic events which alter cable polarization.

== Modern history ==
=== Optical telecommunications cables ===
External image
- Map of sea cables (regularly updated)

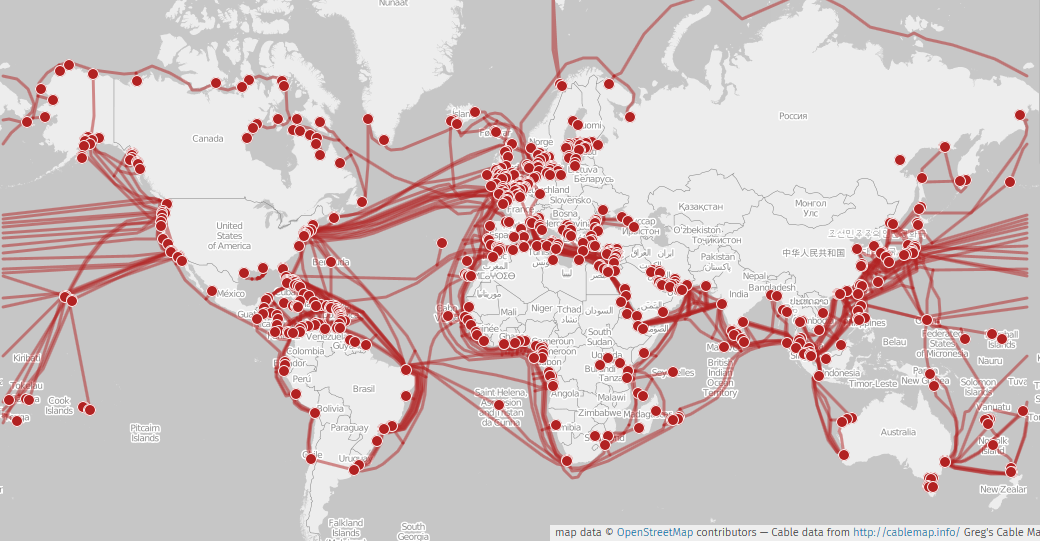
World map showing submarine cables in 2015

In the 1980s, fiber-optic cables were developed. The first transatlantic telephone cable to use optical fiber was TAT-8, which went into operation in 1988. A fiber-optic cable comprises multiple pairs of fibers. Each pair has one fiber in each direction. TAT-8 had two operational pairs and one backup pair. Except for very short lines, fiber-optic submarine cables include repeaters at regular intervals.

Modern optical fiber repeaters use a solid-state optical amplifier, usually an erbium-doped fiber amplifier (EDFA). Each repeater contains separate equipment for each fiber. These comprise signal reforming, error measurement and controls. A solid-state laser dispatches the signal into the next length of fiber. The solid-state laser excites a short length of doped fiber that itself acts as a laser amplifier. As the light passes through the fiber, it is amplified. This system also permits wavelength-division multiplexing, which dramatically increases the capacity of the fiber. EDFA amplifiers were first used in submarine cables in 1995.

Repeaters are powered by a constant direct current passed down the conductor near the centre of the cable, so all repeaters in a cable are in series. Power feed equipment (PFE) is installed at the terminal stations. Typically both ends share the current generation with one end providing a positive voltage and the other a negative voltage. A virtual earth point exists roughly halfway along the cable under normal operation. The amplifiers or repeaters derive their power from the potential difference across them. The voltage passed down the cable is often anywhere from 3000 to 15,000VDC at a current of up to 1,100mA, with the current increasing with decreasing voltage; the current at 10,000VDC is up to 1,650mA. Hence the total amount of power sent into the cable is often up to 16.5 kW.

The optic fiber used in undersea cables is chosen for its exceptional clarity, permitting runs of more than 100 kilometres (62 mi) between repeaters to minimize the number of amplifiers and the distortion they cause. Unrepeated cables are cheaper than repeated cables, and their maximum transmission distance is limited. This transmission distance has increased over the years; in 2014 unrepeated cables of up to 380 kilometres (240 mi) in length were in service; however these require unpowered repeaters to be positioned every 100 km (50 nmi.).

Diagram of an optical submarine cable repeater

Having to shift traffic to satellites resulted in lower-quality signals. To address this issue, AT&T had to improve its cable-laying abilities. It invested $100 million in producing two specialized fiber-optic cable laying vessels. These included laboratories in the ships for splicing cable and testing its electrical properties. Such field monitoring is important because the glass of fiber-optic cable is less malleable than the copper cable that had been formerly used. The ships are equipped with thrusters that increase maneuverability. This capability is important because fiber-optic cable must be laid straight from the stern, which was another factor that copper-cable-laying ships did not have to contend with.

Originally, submarine cables were simple point-to-point connections. With the development of submarine branching units (SBUs), more than one destination could be served by a single cable system. Modern cable systems now usually have their fibers arranged in a self-healing ring to increase their redundancy, with the submarine sections following different paths on the ocean floor. One reason for this development was that the capacity of cable systems had become so large that it was not possible to completely back up a cable system with satellite capacity, so it became necessary to provide sufficient terrestrial backup capability. Not all telecommunications organizations wish to take advantage of this capability, so modern cable systems may have dual landing points in some countries (where back-up capability is required) and only single landing points in other countries where back-up capability is either not required, the capacity to the country is small enough to be backed up by other means, or having backup is regarded as too expensive.

A further redundant-path development over and above the self-healing rings approach is the mesh network whereby fast switching equipment is used to transfer services between network paths with little to no effect on higher-level protocols if a path becomes inoperable. As more paths become available to use between two points, it is less likely that one or two simultaneous failures will prevent end-to-end service.q

As of 2012, operators had "successfully demonstrated long-term, error-free transmission at 100 Gbps across Atlantic Ocean" routes of up to 6,000 km (3,700 mi), meaning a typical cable can move tens of terabits per second overseas. Speeds improved rapidly in the previous few years, with 40 Gbit/s having been offered on that route only three years earlier in August 2009.

Switching and all-by-sea routing commonly increases the distance and thus the round trip latency by more than 50%. For example, the round trip delay (RTD) or latency of the fastest transatlantic connections is under 60 ms, close to the theoretical optimum for an all-sea route. While in theory, a great circle route (GCP) between London and New York City is only 5,600 km (3,500 mi), this requires several land masses (Ireland, Newfoundland, Prince Edward Island and the isthmus connecting New Brunswick to Nova Scotia) to be traversed, as well as the extremely tidal Bay of Fundy and a land route along Massachusetts' north shore from Gloucester to Boston and through fairly built up areas to Manhattan itself. In theory, using this partial land route could result in round trip times below 40 ms (which is the speed of light minimum time), and not counting switching. Along routes with less land in the way, round trip times can approach speed of light minimums in the long term.

The type of optical fiber used in unrepeated and very long cables is often PCSF (pure silica core) due to its low loss of 0.172 dB per kilometer when carrying a 1550 nm wavelength laser light. The large chromatic dispersion of PCSF means that its use requires transmission and receiving equipment designed with this in mind; this property can also be used to reduce interference when transmitting multiple channels through a single fiber using wavelength division multiplexing (WDM), which allows for multiple optical carrier channels to be transmitted through a single fiber, each carrying its own information. WDM is limited by the optical bandwidth of the amplifiers used to transmit data through the cable and by the spacing between the frequencies of the optical carriers; however this minimum spacing is also limited, with the minimum spacing often being 50 GHz (0.4 nm). The use of WDM can reduce the maximum length of the cable although this can be overcome by designing equipment with this in mind.

Optical post amplifiers, used to increase the strength of the signal generated by the optical transmitter often use a diode-pumped erbium-doped fiber laser. The diode is often a high power 980 or 1480 nm laser diode. This setup allows for an amplification of up to +24dBm in an affordable manner. Using an erbium-ytterbium doped fiber instead allows for a gain of +33dBm, however again the amount of power that can be fed into the fiber is limited. In single carrier configurations the dominating limitation is self phase modulation induced by the Kerr effect which limits the amplification to +18 dBm per fiber. In WDM configurations the limitation due to crossphase modulation becomes predominant instead. Optical pre-amplifiers are often used to negate the thermal noise of the receiver. Pumping the pre-amplifier with a 980 nm laser leads to a noise of at most 3.5 dB, with a noise of 5 dB usually obtained with a 1480 nm laser. The noise has to be filtered using optical filters.

Raman amplification can be used to extend the reach or the capacity of an unrepeatered cable, by launching 2 frequencies into a single fiber; one carrying data signals at 1550 nm, and the other pumping them at 1450 nm. Launching a pump frequency (pump laser light) at a power of just one watt leads to an increase in reach of 45 km (25 nmi.) or a 6-fold increase in capacity.

Another way to increase the reach of a cable is by using unpowered repeaters called remote optical pre-amplifiers (ROPAs); these still make a cable count as unrepeatered since the repeaters do not require electrical power but they do require a pump laser light to be transmitted alongside the data carried by the cable; the pump light and the data are often transmitted in physically separate fibers. The ROPA contains a doped fiber that uses the pump light (often a 1480 nm laser light) to amplify the data signals carried on the rest of the fibers.

WDM or wavelength division multiplexing was first implemented in submarine fiber optic cables from the 1990s to the 2000s, followed by DWDM or dense wavelength division mulltiplexing around 2007. Each fiber can carry 30 wavelengths at a time. SDM or spatial division multiplexing submarine cables have at least 12 fiber pairs which is an increase from the maximum of 8 pairs found in conventional submarine cables, and submarine cables with up to 24 fiber pairs have been deployed. The type of modulation employed in a submarine cable can have a major impact in its capacity. SDM is combined with DWDM to improve capacity.

Transponders are used to send data through the cable. The open cable concept allows for the design of a submarine cable independently of the transponders that will be used to transmit data through the cable. SLTE (Submarine Line Terminal Equipment) has transponders and a ROADM (Reconfigurable optical add-drop multiplexer) used for handling the signals in the cable via software control. The ROADM is used to improve the reliability of the cable by allowing it to operate even if it has faults. This equipment is located inside a cable landing station (CLS). C-OTDR (Coherent Optical Time Domain Reflectometry) is used in submarine cables to detect the location of cable faults. The wet plant of a submarine cable comprises the cable itself, branching units, repeaters and possibly OADMs (Optical add-drop multiplexers). The SLTE is usually installed in a data center and it may be possible to purchase capacity in a cable for connecting to other points of the cable, connecting the internet, for example at the NAP of the Americas which connects many Latin American ISPs with networks in the US.

=== Investment and finances ===
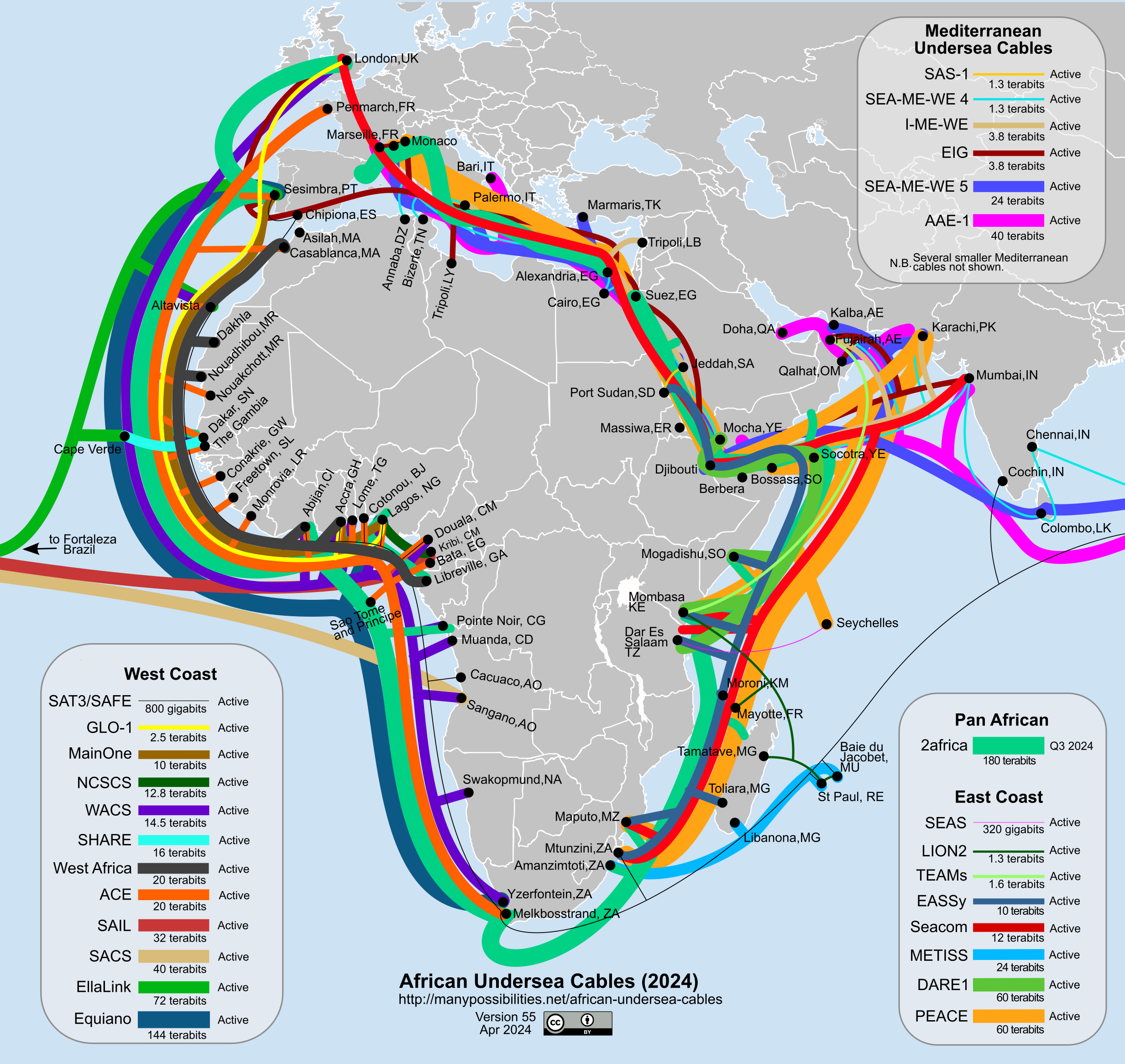
A map of active and anticipated submarine communications cables servicing the African continent in 2024.

A typical multi-terabit, transoceanic submarine cable system costs several hundred million dollars to construct. Almost all fiber-optic cables from TAT-8 in 1988 until approximately 1997 were constructed by consortia of operators. For example, TAT-8 counted 35 participants including most major international carriers at the time such as AT&T Corporation. Two privately financed, non-consortium cables were constructed in the late 1990s, which preceded a massive, speculative rush to construct privately financed cables that peaked in more than $22 billion worth of investment between 1999 and 2001. This was followed by the bankruptcy and reorganization of cable operators such as Global Crossing, 360networks, FLAG, Worldcom, and Asia Global Crossing. Tata Communications' Global Network (TGN) is the only wholly owned fiber network circling the planet.

Some governments have invested in cables. For example, Tonga-Fiji Submarine Cable System is owned and operated by Tonga Cable Limited, which developed and manages the cable with financing support from the Asian Development Bank and World Bank. Tonga Cable Limited is a public enterprise 80% owned by the government. In China, three state-owned companies in China—China Mobile, China Telecom, and China Unicom—invested in undersea cables. In the United States, the U.S. Navy owns over 40,000 nautical miles of various subsea cables.

Most cables in the 20th century crossed the Atlantic Ocean, to connect the United States and Europe. However, capacity in the Pacific Ocean was much expanded starting in the 1990s. For example, between 1998 and 2003, approximately 70% of undersea fiber-optic cable was laid in the Pacific. This is in part a response to the emerging significance of Asian markets in the global economy.

After decades of heavy investment in already developed markets such as the transatlantic and transpacific routes, efforts increased in the 21st century to expand the submarine cable network to serve the Developing World. For instance, in July 2009, an underwater fiber-optic cable line plugged East Africa into the broader Internet. The company that provided this new cable was SEACOM, which is 75% owned by East African and South African investors. The project was delayed by a month due to increased piracy along the coast.

Investments in cables present a commercial risk because cables cover 6,200 km (3350 nmi.) of ocean floor, cross submarine mountain ranges and rifts. Because of this most companies only purchase capacity after the cable is finished.

=== Antarctica ===
Antarctica is the only continent not yet reached by a submarine telecommunications cable. Phone, video, and e-mail traffic must be relayed to the rest of the world via satellite links that have limited availability and capacity. Bases on the continent itself are able to communicate with one another via radio, but this is only a local network. To be a viable alternative, a fiber-optic cable would have to be able to withstand temperatures of −80 °C (−112 °F) as well as massive strain from ice flowing up to 10 metres (33 ft) per year. Thus, plugging into the larger Internet backbone with the high bandwidth afforded by fiber-optic cable is still an as-yet infeasible economic and technical challenge in the Antarctic.

=== Arctic ===
The climate change induced melting of Arctic ice has provided the opportunity to lay new cable networks, linking continents and remote regions. Several projects are underway in the Arctic including 12,650 km (6830 nmi.)"Polar Express" and 14,500 km (7830 nmi.) Far North Fiber. However, scholars have raised environmental concerns about the laying of submarine cables in the region and the general lack of a nuanced regulatory framework. Environmental concerns pertain both to ice-related hazards damaging the cables, and cable installation disturbing the seabed or electromagnetic fields and thermal radiation of the cables impacting sensitive organisms.

In response to the growing threat of undersea wiretapping by specialized submarines and unmanned underwater vehicles (UUVs), recent developments in Physical layer security (PLS) have focused on making the optical transmission itself unrecordable. Unlike digital encryption, which protects the data payload, PLS technologies use Optical chaos or spectral phase encoding to bury the signal within the optical noise floor (low OSNR).

By rendering the intercepted light indistinguishable from background static, these systems aim to neutralize "Harvest now, decrypt later" strategies, as attackers cannot capture a valid waveform to store for future decryption. This approach allows for secure 100 Gbit/s transmission over long-haul infrastructure without requiring physical modifications to the undersea cable itself.

== Importance of submarine cables ==
Submarine cables, while often perceived as ‘insignificant’ parts of communication infrastructure as they lay "hidden" in the seabed, are an essential infrastructure in the digital era, carrying 99% of the data traffic across the oceans. This data includes all internet traffic, military transmissions, and financial transactions.

The total carrying capacity of a submarine cable is in the terabits per second, while a satellite typically offers only 1 gigabit per second, a ratio of more than 1000 to 1. Satellites handle less than 5% – to an estimate of even 0.5% – of global data transmission, and are less efficient, slower, and more expensive. Therefore, satellites are often exclusively considered for remote areas with challenging conditions for laying submarine cables. Submarine cables are thus the essential technical infrastructure for all internet communication.

=== National security ===
As a result of these cables' cost and usefulness, they are highly valued not only by the corporations building and operating them for profit, but also by national governments. For instance, the Australian government considers its submarine cable systems to be "vital to the national economy". Accordingly, the Australian Communications and Media Authority (ACMA) has created protection zones that restrict activities that could potentially damage cables linking Australia to the rest of the world. The ACMA also regulates all projects to install new submarine cables.

Due to their critical role, disruptions to these cables can lead to communication blackouts and, thus, extensive economic losses. The impact of such disruptions is often exemplified by the 2022 Tonga volcanic eruption that severed the island's only submarine cable and thus connectivity to the rest of the world for several days. The cable break was declared a “national crisis,” and repairs took several weeks, leaving Tonga largely isolated during a crucial period for disaster response.

Submarine cable infrastructure may even have additional technical advantages, such as carrying SMART environmental sensors supporting national disaster early warning systems. Furthermore, the cables are predicted to become even more critical with growing demands from 5G networks, the ‘Internet of things’ (IoT), and artificial intelligence on large data transfers.

=== International security ===
Submarine communication cables are a critical infrastructure within the context of international security. Transmitting massive amounts of sensitive data every day, they are essential for both state operations and private enterprises. One of the catalysts for the amount and sensitivity of data flowing through these cables has been the global rise of cloud computing.

The U.S military, for example, uses the submarine cable network for data transfer from conflict zones to command staff in the United States (U.S.). Interruption of the cable network during intense operations could have direct consequences for the military on the ground.

The criticality of cable services makes their geopolitical influence profound. Scholars argue that state dominance in cable networks can exert political pressure, or shape global internet governance.

An example of such state dominance in the global cable infrastructure is China's ‘Digital Silk Road’ strategy funding the expansion of Chinese cable networks, with the Chinese company HMN Technologies often criticised for providing networks for other states, holding up to 10% of the global market share. Some critiques argue that Chinese investments in critical cable infrastructure, being involvement in approximately 25% of global submarine cables, such as the PEACE Cable linking Eastafrica and Europe, may enable China to reroute data traffic through its own networks, and thus apply political pressure. The strategy is countered by the U.S., supporting alternative projects.

== Vulnerabilities of submarine cables ==
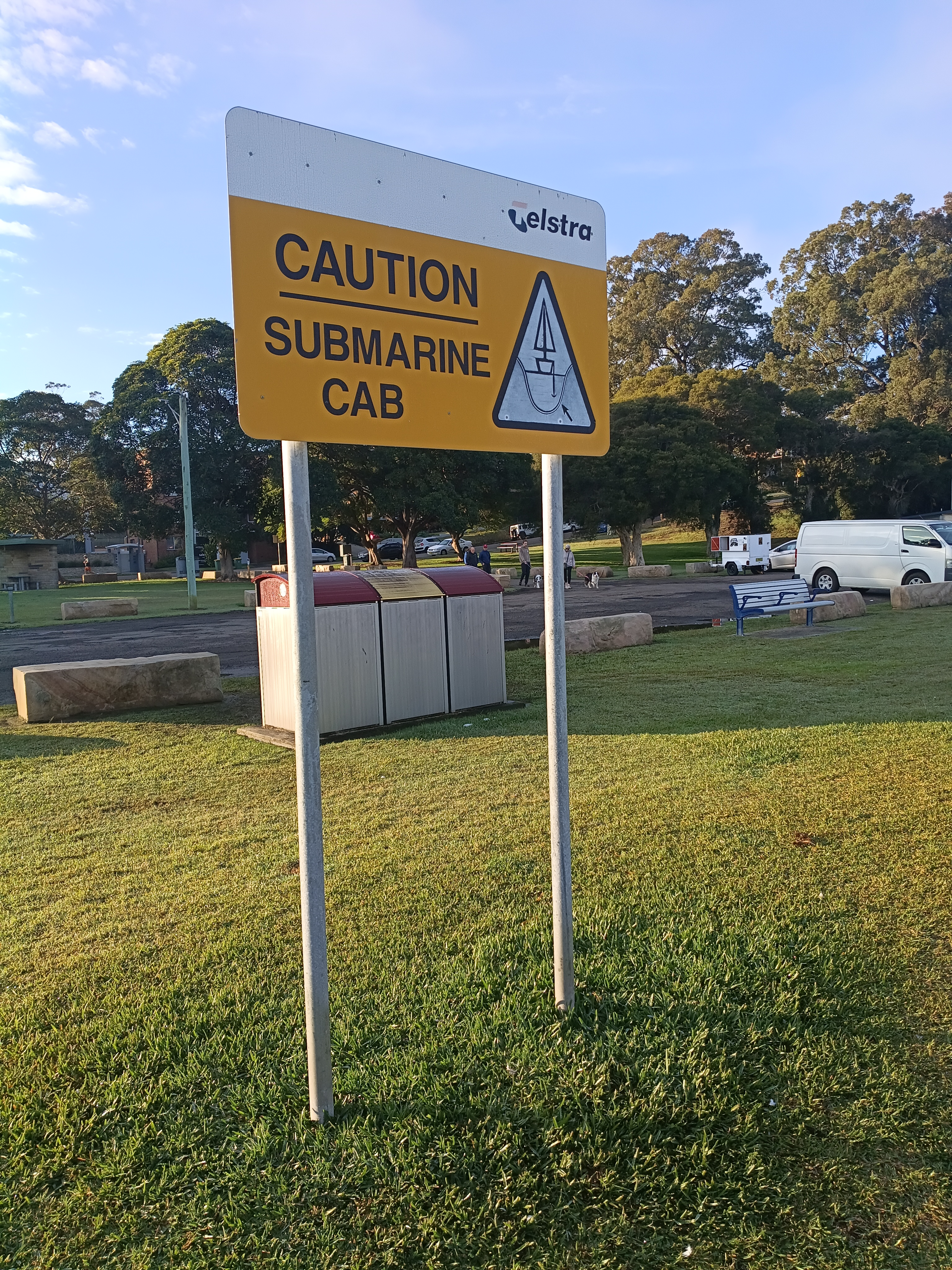
A Telstra warning sign advising boaters of submarine telecommunications cables in Brisbane Water, New South Wales.

Submarine cables are exposed to a variety of potential threats. Many of these threats are accidental, such as by fishing trawlers, ship anchors, earthquakes, turbidity currents, and even shark bites.

Based on surveying breaks in the Atlantic Ocean and the Caribbean Sea, it was found that between 1959 and 1996, fewer than 9% were due to natural events. In response to this threat to the communications network, the practice of cable burial has developed. The average incidence of cable faults was 3.7 per 1,000 km (620 mi) per year from 1959 to 1979. That rate was reduced to 0.44 faults per 1,000 km (500 nmi.) per year after 1985, due to widespread burial of cable starting in 1980.

Still, cable breaks are by no means a thing of the past, with more than 50 repairs a year in the Atlantic Ocean alone, and significant breaks in 2006, 2008, 2009 and 2011.

Several vulnerabilities of submarine communication cables make them attractive targets for espionage and sabotage.

=== Technical perspective ===
==== Technical vulnerabilities ====
The remoteness of these cables in international waters, poses significant challenges for continuous monitoring and increases their attractiveness as targets of physical tampering, data theft, and service disruptions.

The cables' vulnerability is further compounded by technological advancements, such as the development of unmanned underwater vehicles (UUVs), which enable covert cable damage while avoiding detection. However, even low-tech attacks can impact the cable's security significantly, as demonstrated in 2013, when three divers were arrested for severing the main cable linking Egypt with Europe, drastically lowering Egypt's internet speed.

Even in shallow waters, cables remain exposed to risks, as illustrated in the context of the Korea Strait. Such sea passages are often marked as ‘maritime choke points’ where several nations have conflicting interests, increasing the risk of harm from shipping activities and disputes.

Further, most cable locations are publicly available, making them an easy target for criminal acts such as disrupting services or stealing cable materials, which potentially lead to substantial communication blackouts. The stealing of submarine cable has been reported in Vietnam, where more than 11 km (6 nmi.) of cables went missing in 2007 and were later presumed to be found on fishing boats, attributed to their incentives to sell them, according to media reports.

==== Technical countermeasures ====
Typically, cables are buried in waters with a depth of less than 2,000 meters, but increasingly, they are buried in deeper seabed as a means of protection against high seas fishing and bottom trawling. However, this may also be advantageous against physical attacks from organized crime.

Further technical solutions are advanced protective casings, and monitoring them with, e.g., UUVs. Such technical solutions, however, can be challenging to implement and are limited in the remote areas of the high sea. Other proposed solutions include spatial modelling through protective or safety zones and penalties, increasing resources for surveillance, and a more collaborative approach between states and the private sector. However, how to implement and enforce these solutions remains to be determined. The cables' remoteness thus complicates both physical attacks and their protection.

===== Cable repair =====
An animation showing a method used to repair submarine communications cables.

Shore stations can locate a break in a cable by electrical measurements, such as through spread-spectrum time-domain reflectometry (SSTDR), a type of time-domain reflectometry that can be used in live environments very quickly. Presently, SSTDR can collect a complete data set in 20ms. Spread spectrum signals are sent down the wire and then the reflected signal is observed. It is then correlated with the copy of the sent signal and algorithms are applied to the shape and timing of the signals to locate the break.

A cable repair ship will be sent to the location to drop a marker buoy near the break. Several types of grapples are used depending on the situation. If the sea bed in question is sandy, a grapple with rigid prongs is used to plough under the surface and catch the cable. If the cable is on a rocky sea surface, the grapple is more flexible, with hooks along its length so that it can adjust to the changing surface. In especially deep water, the cable may not be strong enough to lift as a single unit, so a special grapple that cuts the cable soon after it has been hooked is used and only one length of cable is brought to the surface at a time, whereupon a new section is spliced in. The repaired cable is longer than the original, so the excess is deliberately laid in a "U" shape on the seabed. A submersible can be used to repair cables that lie in shallower waters.

A number of ports near important cable routes became homes to specialized cable repair ships. Halifax, Nova Scotia, was home to a half dozen such vessels for most of the 20th century including long-lived vessels such as the CS Cyrus West Field, CS Minia and CS Mackay-Bennett. The latter two were contracted to recover victims from the sinking of the RMS Titanic. The crews of these vessels developed many new techniques and devices to repair and improve cable laying, such as the "plough".

=== Cybersecurity perspective ===
==== Cyber vulnerabilities ====
Increasingly, sophisticated cyber-attacks threaten the data traffic on the cables, with incentives ranging from financial gain, espionage, or extortion by either state actors or non-state actors. Further, hybrid warfare tactics can interfere with or even weaponize the data transferred by the cables. For example, low-intensity cyber-attacks can be employed for ransomware, data manipulation and theft, opening up new a new opportunity for the use of cybercrime and grey-zone tactics in interstate disputes.

The lack of binding international cybersecurity standards may create a gap in dealing with cyber-enabled sabotage, that can be used by organized crime. However, attributing an incident to a specific actor or motivation of such actor can be challenging, specifically in cyberspace.

==== Cyber espionage and Intelligence-gathering ====
The rising sophistication of cyberattacks underscores the vulnerability of submarine cables to cyberespionage, ultimately complicating their security. Techniques like cable tapping, hacking into network management systems, and targeting cable landing stations enable covert data access by intelligence agencies, with Russia, the U.S., and the United Kingdom (U.K.) noted as primary players.

These activities are driven by both strategic and economic motives, with advancements in technology making interception and data manipulation more effective and difficult to detect. Recent technological advancements increasing the vulnerability include the use of remote access portals and remote network management systems centralizing control over components, enabling attackers to monitor traffic and potentially disrupt data flows.

Intelligence-gathering techniques have been deployed since the late 19th century. Frequently at the beginning of wars, nations have cut the cables of the other sides to redirect the information flow into cables that were being monitored. The most ambitious efforts occurred in World War I, when British and German forces systematically attempted to destroy the others' worldwide communications systems by cutting their cables with surface ships or submarines.

During the Cold War, the United States Navy and National Security Agency (NSA) were able to place wire taps on Soviet underwater communication lines in Operation Ivy Bells.

These historical intelligence-gathering techniques were eventually countered with technological advancements like the widespread use of end-to-end encryption minimizing the threat of wire tapping.

==== Cybersecurity countermeasures ====
Cybersecurity strategies for submarine cables, such as encryption, access controls, and continuous monitoring, primarily focus on preventing unauthorized data access but do not adequately address the physical protection of cables in vulnerable, remote, high-sea areas as stated above.

As a result, while cybersecurity protocols are effective near coastal landing points, their enforcement across vast stretches of the open ocean becomes a challenge. To address these limitations, experts suggest a broader, multi-layered approach that integrates physical security measures with international cooperation and legal frameworks, especially given the jurisdictional ambiguities in international waters.

Multilateral agreements to establish cybersecurity standards specific to submarine cables are highlighted as critical. These agreements can help bridge the jurisdictional ambiguities and often resulting enforcement gaps in international waters, which ultimately hinder effective protection and are frequently exploited by organized crime.

Some scholars advocate for heightened European Union (E.U.) coordination, recommending improvements in surveillance and response capabilities across various agencies, such as the Coast guard and specific telecommunication regulators. Given the central role of private companies in cable ownership, some experts also underscore the need for stronger collaboration between governments and tech firms to pool resources and develop more innovative security measures tailored to this critical infrastructure.

=== Geopolitical perspective ===
==== Geopolitical vulnerabilities ====
Fishing vessels are the leading cause of accidental damage to submarine communication cables. However, some of the academic discussions and recent incidents point to geopolitical tactics influencing the cable's security more than previously expected. These tactics include the ease and potential with which fishing vessels can blend into regular maritime traffic and implement their attacks.

The propensity for fishing trawler nets to cause cable faults may well have been exploited during the Cold War. For example, in February 1959, a series of 12 breaks occurred in five American trans-Atlantic communications cables. In response, a U.S. naval vessel, the USS Roy O. Hale, detained and investigated the Soviet trawler Novorossiysk. A review of the ship's log indicated it had been in the region of each of the cables when they broke. Broken sections of cable were also found on the deck of the Novorossiysk. It appeared that the cables had been dragged along by the ship's nets, and then cut once they were pulled up onto the deck to release the nets. The Soviet Union's stance on the investigation was that it was unjustified, but the U.S. cited the Convention for the Protection of Submarine Telegraph Cables of 1884 to which Russia had signed (prior to the formation of the Soviet Union) as evidence of violation of international protocol.

Several media outlets and organizations indicate that Russian fishing vessels, particularly in 2022, passed over a damaged submarine cable up to 20 times, suggesting potential political motives and the possibility of hybrid warfare tactics used from Russia's side. Russian naval activities near submarine cables are often linked to increased hybrid warfare strategies targeting submarine cables, where sabotage is argued to serve as a tool to disrupt communication networks during conflict and destabilise adversaries.

These tactics elevate cable security to a significant geopolitical issue. Criminal actors may further target cables as a means of economic warfare, aiming to destabilize economies or convey political messages. The disruption of submarine communication cables in highly politicised maritime areas thus has a significant political component that is receiving increased attention.

After two cable breaks in the Baltic Sea in November 2024, one between Lithuania and Sweden and the other between Finland and Germany, Defence Minister Boris Pistorius argued:

“No one believes that these cables were cut accidentally. I also don't want to believe in versions that these were ship anchors that accidentally caused the damage. Therefore, we have to state, without knowing specifically who it came from, that it is a 'hybrid' action. And we also have to assume, without knowing it yet, that it is sabotage."

This statement underlines the current discourse to recognize cable disruptions as threats to national security, which ultimately leads to their securitization in the international context.

==== Geopolitical risks and countermeasures ====
Submarine cables are inherently vulnerable to transnational threats like organized crime. International collaboration to address these threats tends to fall to existing organizations with a cable specific focus – such as the International Cable Protection Committee (ICPC) – which represent key submarine stakeholders, and play a vital role in promoting cooperation and information sharing among stakeholders. Such organizations are argued to be crucial to develop and implement a comprehensive and coordinated global strategy for cable security.

As of 2025, a tense U.S.-China relationship complicates this task especially in the South China Sea where there are territorial disputes. China has increasing control and influence over global cables networks, while both it and the US financially supports allied-owned cable projects and exerts diplomatic pressure and regulatory action, e.g. against Vietnam.

In light of Nord Stream pipelines sabotage in the Baltic Sea, where subsea infrastructure vital to Germany and Russia was physically destroyed, and other incidents there, NATO has increased patrols and monitoring operations.

=== Legal perspective ===
==== Legal vulnerabilities ====
Submarine cables are internationally regulated within the framework of the United Nations Convention on the Law of the Sea (UNCLOS), in particular through the provisions of Articles 112 and 97, 112 and 115, which mandate operational freedom to lay cables in international waters and beyond the continental shelf and reward measures to protect against shipping accidents.

However, submarine cables face significant legal challenges and lack specific legal protection in UNCLOS and enforcement mechanisms against emerging threats, particular in international waters. This is further complicated by the non-ratification of the treaty by key states such as the U.S. and Turkey. Many countries lack explicit legal provisions to criminalize the destruction or theft of undersea cables, creating jurisdictional ambiguities that organized crime can exploit. Other legal frameworks, such as the 1884 Convention for the Protection of Submarine Telegraph Cables are outdated and fail to address modern threats like cyberattacks and hybrid warfare tactics. The unclear jurisdiction and weak enforcement mechanisms, demonstrate the difficulty to protect submarine cables from organized crime.

The Arctic Ocean in particular exemplifies the challenges associated with surveillance and enforcement in vast and remote areas, leaving a legal vacuum that criminals may exploit. In the Arctic, the absence of a central international authority to oversee submarine cable protection and the reliance on military organizations like NATO hinders general coordinated global responses.

Organizations such as the ICPC thus highlight the need for updated and more comprehensive legal frameworks to ensure the security of submarine cables.

==== Legal countermeasures ====
The legal challenges of protecting submarine cables from organized crime have resulted in recommendations ranging from treaty amendments to domestic law reforms and multi-level governance models.

Some scholars argue that UNCLOS should be updated to protect cables extensively, including cooperative monitoring and enforcement protocols. Additionally, principles from the law of the sea, state responsibility, and the laws on the use of force could be creatively applied to strengthen protections for cables. Enforcement issues could be tackled by aligning domestic laws with UNCLOS, implementing national response protocols, and creating streamlined points of contact for cable incidents. Given the increased involvement of organizations like NATO, others recommend to clarify the roles of military and non-military actors in cable security and enhanced multi-level governance models.

While these proposed legal solutions seem promising, their practical implementation still remains a challenge due to the complexity of international treaties, the need for international cooperation, the lack of domestic criminalization of cable damage, and the evolving nature of technological threats. Additionally, while UNCLOS's ambiguous jurisdiction in international waters hinders effective enforcement, limited political interests seems to hamper treaty development.

== Environmental impact ==
The presence of cables in the oceans can be a danger to marine life. With the proliferation of cable installations and the increasing demand for inter-connectivity that today's society demands, the environmental impact is increasing.

Submarine cables can impact marine life in a number of ways.

=== Alteration of the seabed ===
Seabed ecosystems can be disturbed by the installation and maintenance of cables. The effects of cable installation are generally limited to specific areas. The intensity of disturbance depends on the installation method.

Cables are often laid in the so-called benthic zone of the seabed. The benthic zone is the ecological region at the bottom of the sea where benthos, clams and crabs live, and where the surface sediments, which are deposits of matter and particles in the water that provide a habitat for marine species, are located.

Sediment can be damaged by cable installation by trenching with water jets or ploughing. This can lead to reworking of the sediments, altering the substrate of which they are composed.

According to several studies, the biota of the benthic zone is only slightly affected by the presence of cables. However, the presence of cables can trigger behavioral disturbances in living organisms. The main observation is that the presence of cables provides a hard substrate for anemones attachment. These organisms are found in large number around cables that run through soft sediments, which are not normally suitable for these organisms. This is also the case for flatfish. Although little observed, the presence of cables can also change the water temperature and therefore disturb the surrounding natural habitat.

However, these disturbances are not very persistent over time, and can stabilize within a few days. Cable operators are trying to implement measures to route cables in such a way as to avoid areas with sensitive and vulnerable ecosystems.

=== Entanglement ===
Entanglement of marine animals in cables is one of the main causes of cable damage. Whales are the main animals that entangle themselves in cables and damage them. The encounter between these animals and cables can cause injury and sometimes death. Studies carried out between 1999 and 2022 reported 16 cable ruptures caused by whale entanglement, 13 of them by sperm whales. Between 2004 and 2006, 39 such events were recorded. Cable burial techniques are gradually being introduced to prevent such incidents.

=== The risk of fishing ===
Although submarine cables are located on the seabed, fishing activity can damage the cables. Fishermen using fishing techniques that involve scraping the seabed, or dragging equipment such as trawls or cages, can damage the cables, resulting in the loss of liquids and the chemical and toxic materials that make up the cables.

Areas with a high density of submarine cables have the advantage of being safer from fishing. At the expense of benthic and sedimentary zones, marine fauna is better protected in these maritime regions, thanks to limitations and bans. Studies have shown a positive effect on the fauna surrounding cable installation zones.

=== Pollution ===
Submarine cables are made of copper or optical fibers, surrounded by several protective layers of plastic, wire or synthetic materials. Cables can also be composed of dielectric fluids or hydrocarbon fluids, which act as electrical insulators. These substances can be harmful to marine life.

Fishing, aging cables and marine species that collide with or become entangled in cables can damage cables and spread toxic and harmful substances into the sea. However, the impact of submarine cables is limited compared with other sources of ocean pollution.

There is also a risk of releasing pollutants buried in sediments. When sediments are re-suspended due to the installation of cables, toxic substances such as hydrocarbons may be released.

Preliminary analyses can assess the level of sediment toxicity and select a cable route that avoids the remobilization and dispersion of sediment pollutants. And new, more modern techniques will make it possible to use less polluting materials for cable construction.

=== Sound waves and electromagnetic waves ===
The installation and maintenance of cables requires the use of machinery and equipment that can trigger sound waves or electromagnetic waves that can disturb animals that use waves to find their bearings in space or to communicate. Underwater sound waves depend on the equipment used, the characteristics of the seabed area where the cables are located, and the relief of the area.

Underwater noise and waves can modify the behavior of certain underwater species, such as migratory behavior, disrupting communication or reproduction. Available information is that underwater noise generated by submarine cable engineering operations has limited acoustic footprint and limited duration.

== See also ==
- Bathometer
- Cable layer
- Cable landing point
- Freedom of the seas
- List of domestic submarine communications cables
- List of international submarine communications cables
- Loaded submarine cable
- Submarine power cable
- Transatlantic communications cable
- SMART cables
