= CS Telconia =

British cable ship

History
- Name: Telconia
- Operator: Telegraph Construction and Maintenance Company
- Builder: Swan Hunter, Tyne and Wear, United Kingdom
- Launched: 1909
- Fate: Sold for scrap, 1934

General characteristics
- Type: Cable steamer
- Tonnage: 1,013 GRT
- Length: 213.2 ft (65.0 m)
- Beam: 30.9 ft (9.4 m)
- Depth: 13 ft (4.0 m)

CS Telconia was a British cable ship used in the early 20th century to lay and repair submarine communications cables. She was built in 1909 by Swan Hunter & Wigham Richardson for the Telegraph Construction and Maintenance Company (a subsidiary of the Atlantic Telegraph Company) and remained in service until late 1934.

Telconia is often incorrectly credited with playing a role in cutting German cables in August 1914. In her book The Zimmermann Telegram, American historian Barbara Tuchman incorrectly asserted this based on an interview with a retired Royal Navy officer decades later. Scholars have since determined that in fact it was the British General Post Office ship CS Alert that carried out these attacks. The job of Alert was to locate and cut the five German cables heading into the Atlantic. A similar operation cut the German cables that connected Great Britain to the German coast. Successive missions by Telconia and other ships later in the war eliminated the remainder of Germany's cable network and, in some instances, pulled the cables up with their grapples and relaid them into British and French ports for use by the Allied powers instead.
