= European Forum for Urban Security =

The European Forum for Urban Security (Efus) is a non-governmental organisation established in 1987 in Barcelona under the auspices of the Council of Europe supporting a network of more than 250 European local authorities in 16 countries.

== Goals ==
Efus aims to:

- Advocate a balanced view of security through crime prevention, social cohesion and sanction
- Strengthen crime prevention policies
- Promote the role of local authorities at both a national and European level

== Associations and Coalitions ==
Efus works with the majority of the 27 member states of the European Union and has a consultative status in the field of crime prevention within the United Nations, the Council of Europe, and the European Commission. It is a member of the Civil Society Forum on Drugs. It assists with the work carried out by the European Union Crime Prevention Network.

Efus is a founding member and Secretary of the International Centre for the Prevention of Crime. It is also the Regional Vice President of the Global Network on Safer Cities, led by UN Habitat, representing Europe. In 1998, Efus was awarded an honorific prize by the United Nations Settlements Programme.

On other continents, Efus supports the development of African and Latin American forums.

== Efus Executive Committee ==
The European Forum is led by an Executive Committee of 33 cities, elected annually by the member cities of the Forum, presided by Willy Demeyer, Mayor of Liege, and vice presided by the cities of Amiens (FR), Rotterdam (NL), Stuttgart (DE) and the Generalitat de Catalunya (ES).

== National Forums ==
National Forums were created in Belgium, France, Germany, Italy, Netherlands, Portugal, and Spain.

== Membership ==
The European Forum organises for its members EU-funded exchange projects, training programmes and technical assistance missions, and helps them access EU funds. Based on the principle of “cities helping cities”, Efus members share and compare their experience and expertise in order to strengthen their local security policies and to contribute to the development of European crime prevention policies. Efus represents its members at various levels of government in order to advocate the principles it defends and to bridge the gap between citizens, local authorities and national and European policy makers.

== Sources ==
- “Security, Democracy and Cities: The Future of Prevention” 2012 Conference EFUS, 2012. Web. 14 Dec. 2012
- "Efus 2013 General: A New Dynamic for the Network." European Forum Od Urban Security. EFUS, 2013. Web. 05 Dec. 2013.
- "Efus General Assembly." European Forum for Urban Security. EFUS, 2013. Web. 04 Dec. 2013.
- Fedotov, Yury. "European Forum for Urban Security (EFUS)." UNODC. UNODC, 2013. Web. 03 Dec. 2013.
- "Guilherme Pinto, President of the Efus." European Forum for Urban Security. EFUS, 213. Web. 04 Dec. 2013.
- "International Conference of Saragossa, 2–4 November 2006." European Forum for Urban Security. EFUS, 2013. Web. 04 Dec. 2013.
- "The Naples Manifesto." European Forum for Urban Security. EFUS, 2013. Web. 04 Dec. 2013.
- Pinto, Guilherme. "Executive Committee Calls for Responsible Use of CCTV." European Forum for Urban Security. EFUS, n.d. Web. 03 Dec. 2013.
- "Security, Democracy and Cities. - The Saragossa Manifesto." Security, Democracy and Cities. - The Saragossa Manifesto. FESU, n.d. Web. 03 Dec. 2013.
- "“Sharing the Manifesto” Initiative." European Forum for Urban Security. EFUS, 2013. Web. 03 Dec. 2013.
- "Who We Are." European Forum for Urban Security. EFUS, n.d. Web. 03 Dec. 2013.
