= USS Roy O. Hale =

U.S. Navy Edsall-class destroyer escort

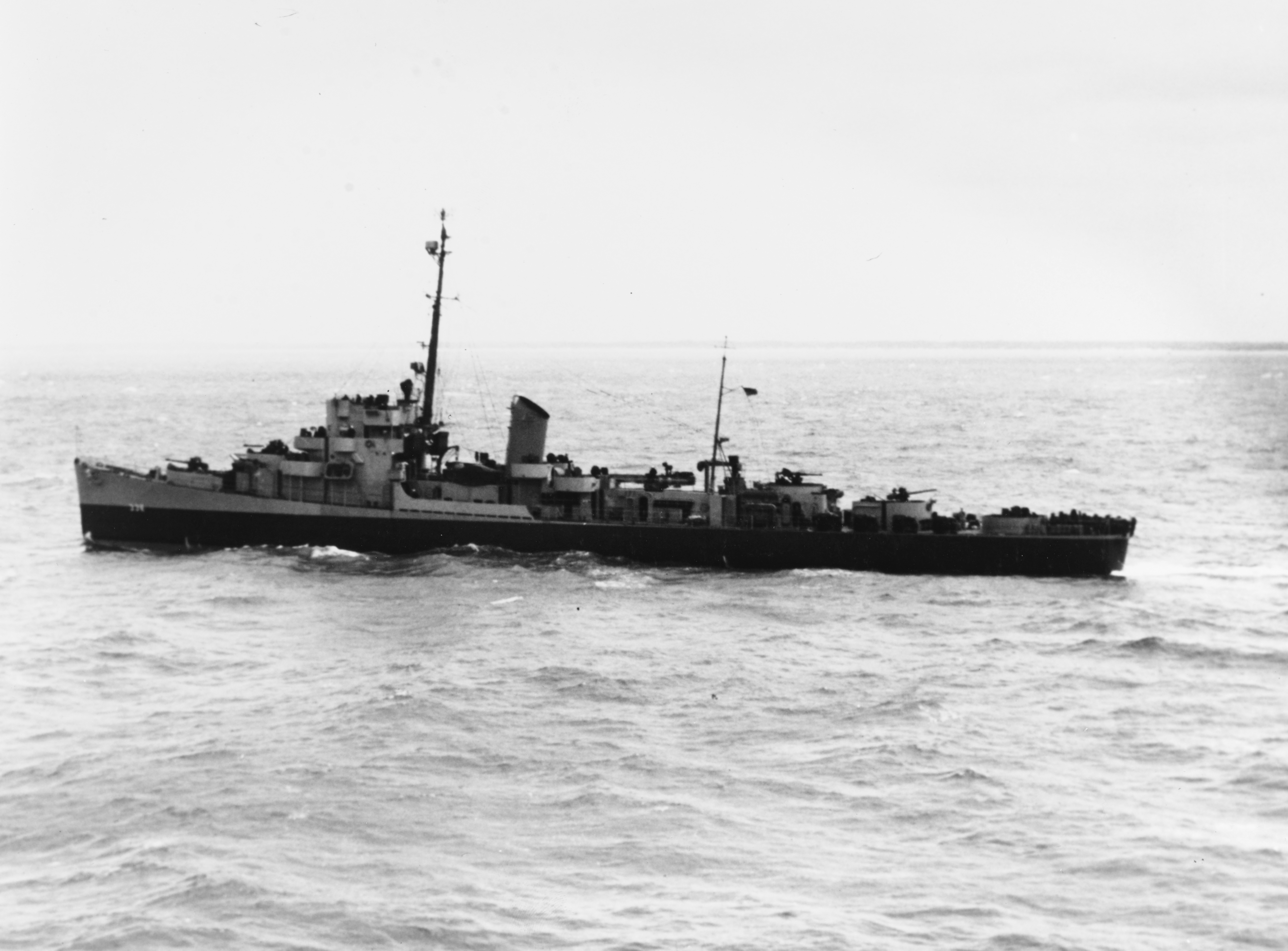

History

United States
- Namesake: Roy Orestus Hale, Jr.
- Builder: Consolidated Steel Corporation, Orange, Texas
- Laid down: 13 September 1943
- Launched: 20 November 1943
- Commissioned: 3 February 1944
- Decommissioned: 15 July 1963
- Reclassified: DER-336, 21 October 1955
- Stricken: 1 August 1974
- Fate: Sold for scrapping 12 March 1975

General characteristics
- Class & type: Edsall-class destroyer escort
- Displacement: 1,253 tons standard; 1,590 tons full load
- Length: 306 feet (93.27 m)
- Beam: 36.58 feet (11.15 m)
- Draft: 10.42 full load feet (3.18 m)
- Propulsion: 4 FM diesel engines, 4 diesel-generators, 6,000 shp (4.5 MW), 2 screws
- Speed: 21 knots (39 km/h)
- Range: 9,100 nmi. at 12 knots; (17,000 km at 22 km/h)
- Complement: 8 officers, 201 enlisted
- Armament: 3 × single 3 in (76 mm)/50 guns; 1 × twin 40 mm AA guns; 8 × single 20 mm AA guns; 1 × triple 21 in (533 mm) torpedo tubes; 8 × depth charge projectors; 1 × depth charge projector (hedgehog); 2 × depth charge tracks

USS Roy O. Hale (DE-336) was an Edsall-class destroyer escort in service with the United States Navy from 1944 to 1946 and from 1957 to 1963. She was scrapped in 1975.

== Namesake ==
Roy Orestus Hale Jr. was born on 10 May 1916 in Monroe, Louisiana. He graduated from the U.S. Naval Academy and was commissioned ensign in the United States Navy on 2 June 1938. After a year at sea, Hale underwent aviation training at Pensacola, Florida, Miami, Florida, and San Diego, California, and on 21 June 1941, joined Scouting Squadron 2 on board USS Lexington. Promoted to lieutenant (junior grade) in October, he remained on board that carrier after the United States entered World War II.

He participated in the Pacific raids of February and March 1942 and flew his scout plane in the Battle of the Coral Sea, 7–8 May. Failing to return from that mission, Hale was presumed killed in action and was posthumously awarded the Distinguished Flying Cross for extraordinary achievement in aerial combat and his " ... courageous determination and aggressiveness ... attacking enemy aircraft in spite of fierce fighter opposition."

== History ==
She was laid down on 13 September 1943 by the Consolidated Steel Corp., Orange, Texas; launched 20 November 1943; sponsored by Mrs. Roy O. Hale, mother of Lieutenant (junior grade) Hale and commissioned on 3 February 1944.

=== World War II ===
==== Battle of the Atlantic ====
Following shakedown off Bermuda, Roy O. Hale served as a training ship for pre-commissioning details of escort crews in Chesapeake Bay and provided escort services between New York and Norfolk, Virginia. On 1 July 1944 she departed Norfolk, Virginia, on the first of seven transatlantic convoys. Engaged in that duty until the surrender of Germany, her first convoy consisted of 24 ships bound for Taranto, Italy. On 20 July 4 days after reaching her destination, she was at sea with the return convoy which she left at New York on 3 August. From 24 August to 27 September, she made another escort run to Italy, then shifted to the North Atlantic sealanes. Between 30 October 1944 and 3 June 1945, she escorted five transatlantic convoys from the United States to ports in the United Kingdom and France.

==== Pacific War ====
After an overhaul, the destroyer escort departed Norfolk for the Pacific on 13 July. She underwent refresher training off Cuba, then continued on to San Diego, and was engaged in further training when hostilities ceased. On 26 August, she sailed for Pearl Harbor, arriving on 2 September for a month of escort and plane guard duty. On 17 October she returned to San Diego with veterans awaiting discharge, then proceeded to Panama and the east coast. Back in the Norfolk area by 3 November, Roy O. Hale shifted to Green Cove Springs, Florida, in early December and began inactivation. She was decommissioned on 11 July 1946 and was berthed there, with the Atlantic Reserve Fleet, until ordered activated to participate in the continental air defense program established in the 1950s.

=== Cold War ===
In December 1955, Roy O. Hale entered the Boston Navy Yard for conversion to a radar picket escort. Redesignated DER-336 on 7 December 1955, she was recommissioned on 29 January 1957 and assigned to Atlantic Barrier Patrol duty. Based at Newport, Rhode Island, as of 2 July, she continued that duty, steaming on alternate radar picket stations from Newfoundland to the Azores into the 1960s.

Although primarily employed in the early warning program, she was called on to enforce an 1884 treaty for the protection of international submarine cables in February 1959 during the Transatlantic cables incident. On the 26th, she sent a party aboard the Russian trawler MV Novorossisk to investigate reports from the American Telephone & Telegraph and Western Union companies that breaks had occurred in five transatlantic cables along the track of the trawler. There were no indications of intentions "other than fishing."

=== Decommissioning and fate ===
In late 1962, Roy O. Hale again prepared for inactivation. Decommissioned in April 1963, she was berthed with the Reserve Fleet at Philadelphia, Pennsylvania, until struck from the Navy list 1 August 1974 and sold for scrap to Union Minerals & Alloys Corp. on 1 April 1975.
