= CS Alert (1890) =

Cable-laying ship

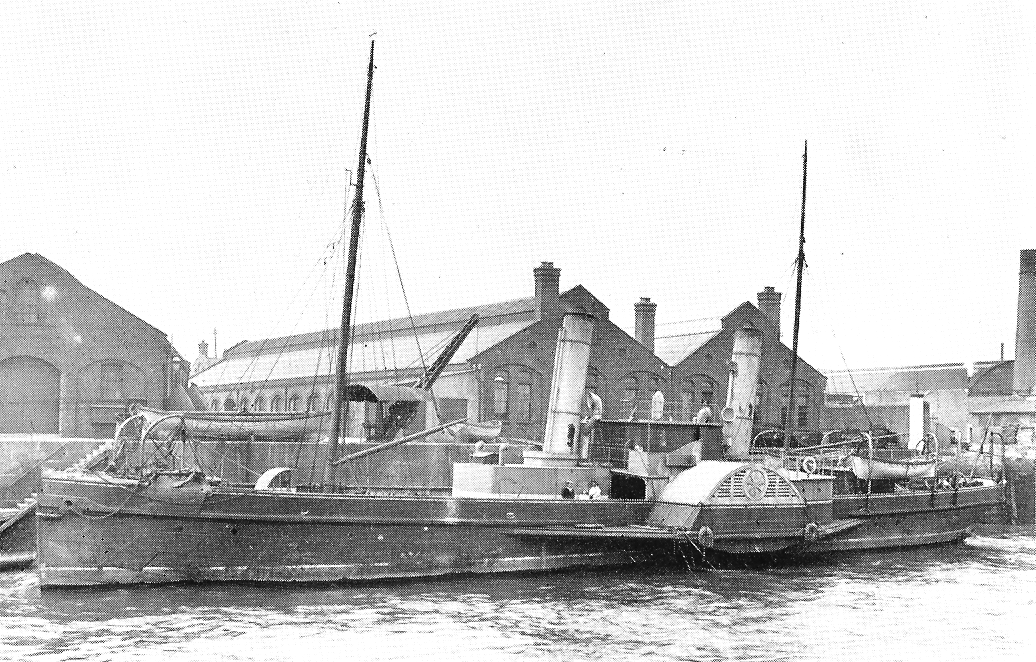

History
- Name: The Lady Carmichael; Alert; Hobgoblin; Nordham
- Builder: A. McMillan and Son, Dumbarton
- Launched: 6 March 1871
- Fate: Scrapped 1932

General characteristics
- Type: Paddle-steamer cable ship
- Tonnage: 369 t
- Displacement: 760 t
- Length: 167.8 ft (51.1 m)
- Beam: 25.3 ft (7.7 m)
- Draught: 10 ft (3.0 m)
- Depth: 12.1 ft (3.7 m)
- Propulsion: Twin paddles
- Notes: The ship dimensions above are from Haigh. Wilkinson gives them as 167 × 27 × 12 ft.
- Max winch load: 10 tons at 1 knot

CS Alert, or HMTS Alert, was a cable-laying ship that had a significant role in World War I. She was launched in 1871 for the Submarine Telegraph Company with the name The Lady Carmichael. In 1890 the ship was acquired by the General Post Office (GPO) as part of the nationalisation of the British telegraph network. At the outbreak of World War I, Alert was immediately dispatched to cut German telegraph cables in the English Channel, seriously damaging Germany's ability to securely communicate with the rest of the world. Alert was taken out of service as a cable ship in 1915 but her cable-handling gear was retained for fitting on her replacement. After the war, she worked as a merchant ship under various names, finally being wrecked at Redcar under the name Norham in 1932.

== Construction and first cable work ==
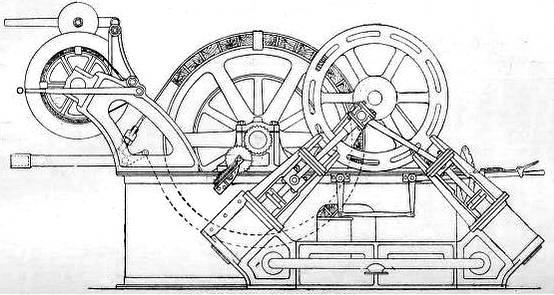
Alert's cable-handling gear

The ship was built by A. McMillan and Son of Dumbarton for the Submarine Telegraph Company, who had previously laid the first submarine cable across the English Channel. She was launched on 6 March 1871 and named The Lady Carmichael after the wife of the company chairman. The ship was used for repair work in coastal waters. She was particular suitable for this because she had a shallow draught and could turn on the spot by counter-rotating her twin paddles. She was able to execute a turn even quicker (though not on the spot) simply by taking one of her paddles out of gear. Reversing the paddles allowed her to stop faster than an equivalent propeller-driven ship and gave her the ability to move astern just as fast as she could move forward.

The cable-handling gear, built by Thames Iron Works and designed by W. B. Esson, could also double as a paying-out machine for cable-laying work. In this mode the winch was taken out of gear and controlled with the brake. The cable sheave was mounted on a boom on the bow. The same cable-handling gear was fitted to several other cable ships, but the Alert additionally carried a steam winch to deal with the heavy portions of cable near the landing sites. Cables are more heavily protected at the shore ends because of the greater risk of damage from other ships such as fishing boats. Alert sometimes had to deal with strains up to 30 tons. One of the most exposed jobs on the ship was that of the crew placing stoppers on the cable being handled. This was done from narrow footboards on the sides of the bow of the ship by men prevented from falling into the sea only by a line attached under their arms.

== GPO ownership ==
In 1890 the Submarine Telegraph Company was nationalised when the General Post Office (GPO) was given a monopoly of the telegraph in the UK. The GPO took over operation of the ship and renamed it Alert. In 1902, Alert laid the St. Margaret's Bay, England – La Panne, Belgium 2-telephone cable manufactured by Siemens. In 1912, she laid the Abbotscliffe, England – Cap Gris Nez, France 4-telephone cable. This was the first continuously loaded cable installed by the GPO. At some point, the GPO changed the ship prefix of Alert, along with all its other cable ships, from CS (Cable Ship) to HMTS (His Majesty's Telegraph Ship).

== War work ==
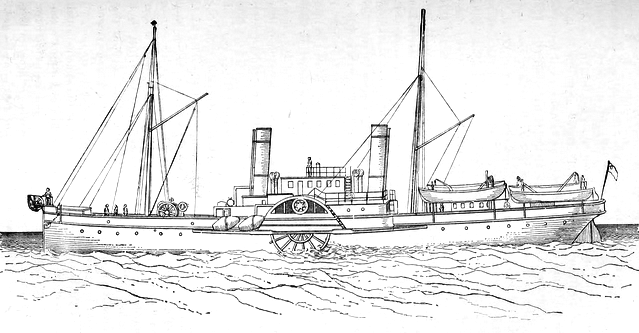
CS Alert side view, based on a photograph by W. R. Culley, chief electrician (chief engineer) aboard Alert

When Britain entered World War I, one of its first acts was to order the cutting of German submarine telegraph cables around the world. At the time, Britain dominated the worldwide telegraph network. The idea was to force German communication on to radio where it could be intercepted more easily. This would give British codebreakers a better chance of gaining useful information. Without telegraph connections, Germany could only directly communicate with locations outside Europe through its high-power radio transmitter at Nauen. This included its African colonies and the United States. A few hours after war was declared at 11 p.m. on 4 August 1914, Alert was sent out from Dover on a planned mission to drag for, and cut, German cables in the English Channel. On board, and in charge of the operation, was Superintendent Bourdeaux. He was the only man on board who knew the purpose of the Alert's secret mission as she set sail, and it was his job to ensure the correct cables were cut.

There were five cables in the Channel linking Germany directly to France, Spain and the Azores, and indirectly to the rest of the world. Alert was not accompanied by a Royal Navy escort (none could be spared), which put her in danger of interception by German warships. Four cables were cut overnight, starting with the cable to Spain. In deteriorating weather, Alert struggled with the fifth cable, losing many of the grapples in her store to damage. A flotilla of unidentified destroyers was spotted approaching, but Alert continued her work and succeeded in cutting the cable just as they arrived. The destroyers turned out to be French, and after interrogating Alert and discovering she was cutting German cables, the French crew raised a cheer. Cutting the channel cables almost completely cut off telegraph connections to Germany.

Many sources incorrectly report that the Channel cables were cut by CS Telconia. It has been established from archives that this is not the case and that CS Alert was the ship responsible.

One of the most serious consequences of the cable cutting for Germany was that Britain was able to intercept and decode the Zimmermann telegram. This was an attempt by Germany to make a secret alliance with Mexico who stood to gain United States territory as a result. Without a secure telegraph connection of their own to the Americas, the Germans were allowed to use the US diplomatic telegraph link, which the US believed would assist peace efforts. Unfortunately for the Germans, this supposedly secure route went through Britain and was listened to by British intelligence. The British claimed they had intercepted the telegram in Mexico to avoid the embarrassment of admitting they were listening to American diplomatic traffic. The revelation of this German duplicity was partly responsible for the US later entering the war.

== Post cable-ship history ==
Alert was taken out of service in 1915 as she was considered unseaworthy. Her cable-winching gear was recovered and installed on the second CS Alert built in 1918. However, this was later replaced with the same type of gear fitted to the third CS Monarch. In 1918 she was sold into mercantile service with the Brito-Franco Shipping Company of Newcastle and initially reverted to her previous name of The Lady Carmichael. Subsequently, in 1920 she was renamed Hobgoblin after having been re-engined. Her name was again changed in 1923 to Norham. In 1927 she was sold to the St. Baldred Shipping Company of Blyth. On 17 July 1932 she was wrecked on the South Training Wall at Redcar and was scrapped after being refloated on 2 August 1932.

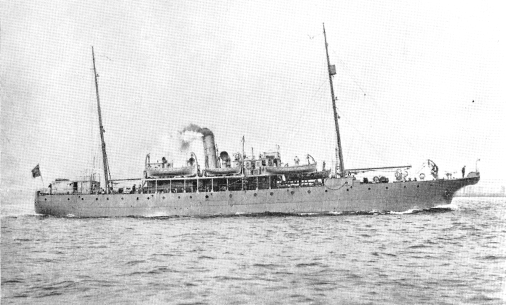
The second CS Alert

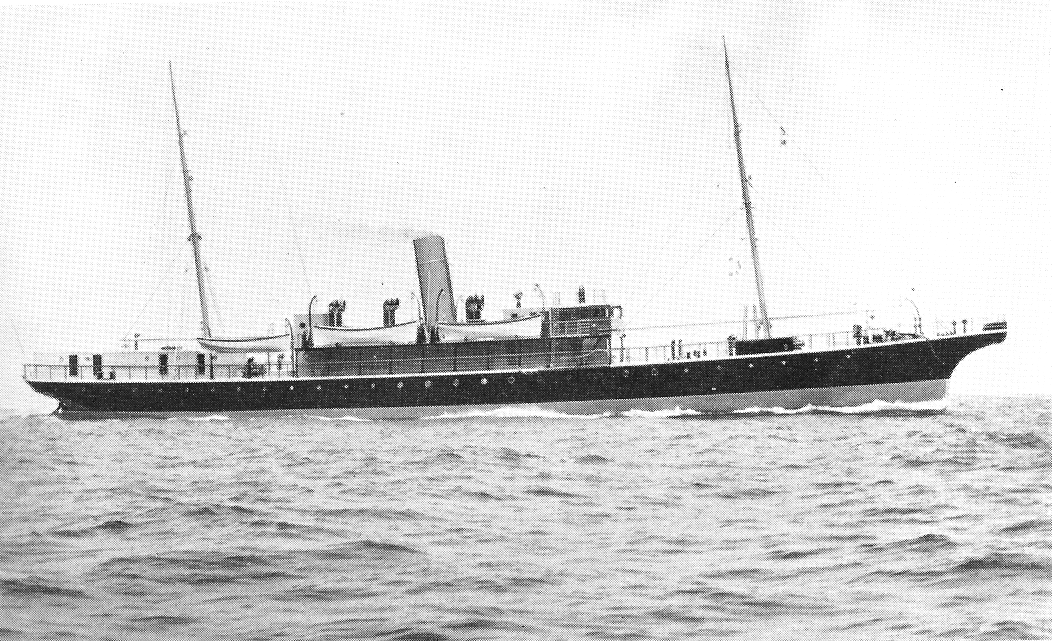
The third CS Monarch

== Bibliography ==
- Bright, Charles Tilston, Submarine Telegraphs, London: Crosby Lockwood, 1898 OCLC 776529627.
- Corera, Gordon, Intercept: The Secret History of Computers and Spies, Hachette UK, 2015 ISBN 0-297-87174-9.
- Fulwider, Chad R., German Propaganda and U.S. Neutrality in World War I, University of Missouri Press, 2017 ISBN 0-8262-7343-2.
- Glover, Bill, "CS Lady Carmichael / HMTS Alert (1)", History of the Atlantic Cable & Undersea Communications, retrieved and archived 4 January 2019.
- Haigh, Kenneth Richardson, Cableships and Submarine Cables, Adlard Coles, 1968 OCLC 497380538.
- Headrick, Daniel R., The Invisible Weapon: Telecommunications and International Politics, 1851-1945, Oxford University Press, 1991 ISBN 0-19-972819-4.
- Jeffreys-Jones, Rhodri, In Spies We Trust: The Story of Western Intelligence, Oxford University Press, 2013 ISBN 0-19-958097-9
- O'Connell, John F., Submarine Operational Effectiveness in the 20th Century: Part One (1900-1939), iUniverse, 2010 ISBN 1-4502-3690-1.
- Wilkinson, Henry Daniel, Submarine Cable Laying and Repairing, London: "The Electrician" Printing and Publishing Co., 1908 OCLC 964851092.
- Winkler, Jonathan Reed, Nexus, Harvard University Press, 2008 ISBN 0-674-02839-2.
