= Convention for the Protection of Submarine Telegraph Cables =

1884 treaty to protect submarine communications cables

- Signed: 14 March 1884
- Location: Paris, France
- Effective: 1 May 1888
- Condition: Exchange of ratifications
- Signatories: 27
- Parties: 36 (as of 2013)
- Ratifiers: 47
- Depositary: Government of the French Republic

Full text
- Convention for the Protection of Submarine Telegraph Cables at Wikisource

The Convention for the Protection of Submarine Telegraph Cables is a multilateral treaty that was signed in 1884 in order to protect submarine communications cables that had begun to be laid in the 19th century.

== Provisions ==
The convention made it a punishable offence to damage submarine communications cables. In addition, all ships were to be regulated to staying a distance of 1 nautical mile (1.9 km) away from cable laying ships when in operation. Any ship that accidentally hooked a cable and sacrificed its fishing nets to avoid breaking it would be compensated for the lost equipment.

== State parties ==
The convention has been signed, ratified, and acceded to by the following parties. A number of dependent territories ratified the convention or had the convention extended to them.

For states that were not original signatories, the date they accepted the convention is indicated.

State	Signature	Ratification	Notes
Algeria	–	1976	
Argentina	1884	1885	
Australia	–	1901	Upon federation, Australia accepted the ratifications of New South Wales, Queensland, South Australia, Tasmania, Victoria, and Western Australia to be applicable to the Commonwealth of Australia.
Austria-Hungary	1884	1885	Austria and Hungary both submitted separate notifications of succession.
Austria	–	1921	Notification of succession of ratification by Austria-Hungary.
Belgium	1884	1885	
(Empire of Brazil) Brazil	1884	1885	
Canada	–	1888	Extension by the United Kingdom to cover Canada.
(British Cape Colony) Cape Colony	–	1888	This ratification no longer has any force for any state; South Africa has not declared its succession to the ratification.
Colombia	1884	–	
Costa Rica	1884	1885	
Czechoslovakia	–	1925	This ratification no longer has any force for any state; neither the Czech Republic nor Slovakia have declared their succession to the ratification.
Free City of Danzig	–	1926	This ratification no longer has any force for any state.
Denmark	1884	1885	
Dominican Republic	1884	1885	
El Salvador	1884	1885	
Fiji	–	1971	
France	1884	1885	
(German Empire) Germany	1884	1885	
Greece	1884	1888	
Guatemala	1884	1885	
Hungary	–	1922	Notification of succession of the ratification by Austria-Hungary.
Iran (Persia)	1884	–	
(Kingdom of Italy) Italy	1884	1885	
(Empire of Japan) Japan	–	1884	
Luxembourg	1884	1885	
Malta	–	1968	
Natal	–	1888	This ratification no longer has any force for any state; South Africa has not declared its succession to the ratification.
Netherlands	1884	1885	Also applied to the colonies of the Dutch East Indies, Territory of Curaçao and Suriname (1892). Presently still applies to the territories making up the Territory of Curaçao: Aruba (1986), Curaçao (2010), Sint Maarten (2010), Caribbean Netherlands (2010)
(Dominion of Newfoundland) Newfoundland	–	1888	Extension by the United Kingdom to cover Newfoundland; this ratification is now subsumed within Canada's.
New South Wales	–	1888	This ratification is now subsumed within the convention's application to Australia.
New Zealand	–	1888	Extension by the United Kingdom to cover New Zealand.
Norway	–	1905	Convention previously applied to Norway via the ratification of Sweden-Norway.
Ottoman Empire	1884	1885	This ratification now applied to Turkey.
Poland	–	1934	
Portugal	1884	1885	
Queensland	–	1886	This ratification is now subsumed within the convention's application to Australia.
Romania	1884	1886	
Russia	1884	1885	
(Kingdom of Serbia) Serbia	1884	1885	This ratification was previously accepted as applicable to it by Yugoslavia and by Serbia and Montenegro.
South Australia	–	1885	This ratification is now subsumed within the convention's application to Australia.
Spain	1884	1885	
(Union between Sweden and Norway) Sweden-Norway	1884	1885	This ratification now applies to Sweden.
Tasmania	–	1888	This ratification is now subsumed within the convention's application to Australia.
Tunisia	–	1889	
United Kingdom	1884	1885	
United States	1884	1885	
Uruguay	1884	1885	
(Victoria (state)) Victoria	–	1885	This ratification is now subsumed within the convention's application to Australia.
Western Australia	–	1888	This ratification is now subsumed within the Convention's application to Australia.
