= International Cable Protection Committee =

Nonprofit dedicated to submarine cable protection

- Logo
- Motto: Sharing the Seabed in Harmony with Others
- Headquarters: United Kingdom
- Membership: More than 190 member organisations from over 69 countries
- 22 May 1958
- Website www.iscpc.org

The International Cable Protection Committee (ICPC) is a submarine cable protection non-profit organisation. It was formed in 1958 to promote the protection of international telecommunications and power submarine cables against human and natural hazards. It provides a forum for the exchange of technical, legal, and environmental information about submarine cables and engages with stakeholders and governments globally to promote submarine cable protection. The ICPC has over 190 Member organisations from over 69 nations, including cable operators, owners, manufacturers, industry service providers, as well as governments. The ICPC provides information related to submarine cables generally, best practices for cable protection, and applicable international law and treaties.

Over 99% of the world's intercontinental electronic communications traffic is carried by the undersea cable infrastructure. Likewise, submarine power cables underpin the global expansion of offshore renewable energy generation. As such, the impact of failures of these critical telecommunications and power cables can be devastating to social and economic stability. This is why submarine cables are classified as "critical infrastructure" that is to be protected worldwide from physical damage due to human made or natural causes.

== Prime activities of the ICPC ==
The ICPC seeks to promote and protect freedoms to install and maintain submarine telecommunications and power transmission cables and mitigate risks of damage to those cables. It works with governments, other marine industries, international organisations (including various United Nations bodies), and NGOs to promote cable awareness, cable protection best practices, and effective international agreements. The ICPC actively participates in the negotiation of multilateral treaties relating to the oceans and monitors the development and implementation of other international agreements and national legislation in order to ensure cable protection and resilience. The ICPC supports peer-reviewed research into the interactions of cables with the marine environment to provide an evidence-based foundation for those interactions. It commissions and encourages peer-reviewed research on the environmental characteristics of cables. The organisation also promulgates recommendations for cable installation, protection, and maintenance.

As directed by its executive committee, ICPC has prioritised work on the following issues: (1) cable awareness and reduction of cable damage risks (particularly from fishing and anchoring); (2) mitigating risks of deep seabed mining, including effective charting of cables in the deep ocean; (3) promoting cable security; (4) ensuring appropriate treatment of submarine cables under a new international treaty for the conservation and sustainable use of Biodiversity Beyond National Jurisdiction (BBNJ); and (5) continuing development of ICPC Recommendations. At the start of the COVID-19 pandemic in early 2020, the ICPC has devoted significant effort to ensure that governments and industry take effective measures to ensure installation and repair of submarine cables continue during the tumultuous time because the world's reliance on submarine cables increased considerably. In April 2020, ICPC issued its “Call to Action” that proposed practical measures to ensure efficient conduct of submarine cable activities while protecting public health.

In early 2022, the ICPC published the document (in English, French and Spanish translations), “Government Best Practices for Protecting and Promoting Resilience of Submarine Telecommunications Cables” to assist governments in developing laws, policies, and practices to foster the development and protection of submarine telecommunications cables, the infrastructure of the Internet. In addition, a Best Practices Annex, titled: “Fish Aggregation Devices (FADs) - Risks to Submarine Cable Deployment and Operations,” identifies recommended actions for governments to protect submarine telecommunications cables from interactions with Fish Aggregation Devices (FADs) that are known to pose risk to marine vessel operations and damage cables during and after their installation. In presenting these Best Practices, the ICPC encourages government and industry discussions on this topic to ensure appropriate steps can be taken at a national and regional level to maintain continuity of critical telecommunications infrastructure.

== History ==
The Cable Damage Committee was established on 22 May 1958. The name of the committee was later changed to the International Cable Protection Committee (ICPC) in 1967 to better reflect the intended aims of the organisation and its membership. The original intent was for the "Main Committee," as it was originally known, to formulate the policies, which a small Sub-Committee of Members, voted in at each Main Committee meeting. Adopted policies were then organised and subsequently implemented. In addition, the Sub-Committee ran the internal administration of the organisation through the Secretary.

In the early years, the Sub-Committee would meet frequently, organising many aspects, such as Cable Warning Charts - which were later devolved down to the organisation of individual Members. Most of the detailed notes from these early meetings have disappeared prior to 1975, but they always produced a formal report to the Main Committee.

The title "Plenary" for the Main Committee first appeared in 1972 but would not appear to have been a firm change, but rather a title that evolved gradually during the 1970s. By contrast, the title "Executive" for the Sub-Committee was a firm decision at the 1977 Plenary meeting. It shall be noted that previously in October 1974, ICPC held its 13th Plenary in Cape Town, South Africa and in 2018, the annual Plenary returned to the coastal city for its 60th Diamond Jubilee Plenary to celebrate 60 years of heritage since its incorporation in 1958. The offices of Chair, Vice-Chair and Executive Committee Members have been held by the member administration rather than the individual person. This enables a reorganisation of staff to take place within an administration, without effecting the committee's organisation. Before 1976 there was no vice-chair and, if the administration holding the chair was unable to attend, as occurred twice, then a chair had to be nominated at the start of the meeting. After 1976 the absence of the chair was more smoothly covered, as occurred in 1979 and 1991.

The Secretary was initially provided by Cable & Wireless Communications Ltd, and subsequently passed to the British Post Office in 1960, although for several years after that, the official address remained with Cable & Wireless. The Secretariat remained with BPO/British Telecom International continuously until 1990, when an independent Secretary was engaged. This was followed later by the appointment of an International Cable Legal Adviser (1999) and a Marine Environmental Adviser (2003).

Presently, governance is exercised by ICPC Limited, which operates through a 17-Member Executive Committee, elected by the ICPC membership.

== Membership, organisation, and governance ==
As of September 2022, the ICPC has approximately 185 Members from over 65 countries.

Membership benefits include access to a repository of technical and environmental information and probably the largest single source of legal information on international submarine cables. Member organisations actively participate in the annual Plenary meeting and are also involved in ICPC's Working Groups.

ICPC membership has expanded, and since 2011 as national governments have been allowed to join as a Government Member in their own right. Government Members include Australia, Bermuda, France, Malta, Singapore, and the United Kingdom. Since February 2013, Associate Membership is available to any individual or organisation that shares the goals of the ICPC.

- Full Membership is open to submarine cable owners, submarine cable maintenance authorities, submarine cable system manufacturers, cable ship operators, and submarine cable route survey companies.
- Government Membership. The ICPC recognises that submarine cable protection interests are better served if the benefits of membership are available to Governments.
- Associate Membership is available to any organisation or individual that has an interest in the submarine cable industry, wishes to be informed about its development and wants to support the ICPC in achieving its goals.

The ICPC's full members elect an executive committee (EC), whose members serve staggered terms, as well as a Chair and Vice Chair (with individuals serving no more than three consecutive terms). The EC serves as ICPC's governing body. The ICPC also maintains a Secretariat and Project Manager, led by a General Manager, to provide day-to-day management and administration with the assistance of a small staff. ICPC appoints an International Cable Law Adviser (to advise and represent ICPC in international law and other legal matters), a Marine Environment Adviser (to advise on interactions between cables and the marine environment), and a United Nations Observer Representative (to represent the ICPC at the United Nations in New York).

== Recommendations ==
The ICPC develops and maintains a suite of industry Recommendations targeted at the various lifespan stages of submarine cables, from conception to retirement. These Recommendations function as guides and best practices, but they are not standards, as ICPC is not a standard-setting organisation. They are available upon reasonable request to the Secretariat and are available to organisations through ICPC membership.

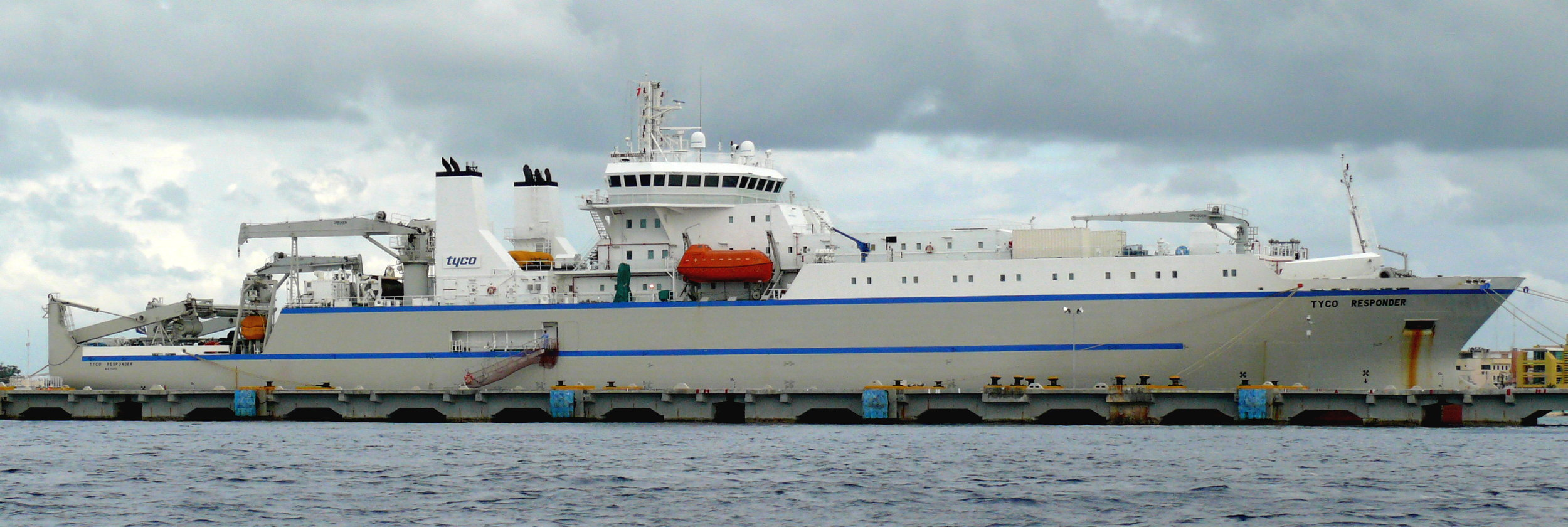
The Tyco Responder submarine telecommunications cable ship at dock back in February 2008.

== Educational resources ==
As part of its cable awareness mission, and to assist its Members, the ICPC develops and distributes educational materials about the importance of submarine cables, their operational and environmental characteristics, their treatment under international and national law, and the risks of damage to cables. The ICPC and its Members use these materials to engage with governments, other ocean industries (including fishing, shipping, offshore energy, and mining), and the public.

In collaboration with the United Nations Environmental Programme World Climate Monitoring Centre (UNEP-WCMC), the ICPC published a landmark report, "Submarine cables and the oceans: connecting the world," which provides a wealth of information about the importance of cables, their characteristics and operations, law and policy, environmental science, and history. This report is the most-viewed report ever published by UNEP-WCMC.

Relevant information is also provided to prospective new submarine cable owners to encourage the adoption of minimum industry standards for the benefit of all involved with the seabed. The ICPC has also entered into memoranda of understanding (MoU) with the International Seabed Authority (ISA), European Subsea Cables Association (ESCA), International Hydrographic Organization (IHO), SubOptic and Rhodes Academy of Oceans Law and Policy through the University of New Hampshire to further cooperation with these bodies. The ICPC also has working relationships with Asia-Pacific Economic Cooperation (APEC), Center for International Law at the National University of Singapore (CIL), Council for Security Cooperation in the Asia Pacific (CSCAP), EastWest Institute, Economic and Social Commission for Asia and Pacific (ESCAP), International Telecommunication Union (ITU), United Nations Economic and Social Council (UN ECOSOC), ROGUCCI and Sargasso Sea Commission.

The ICPC also publishes a bi-annual, marine-focused newsletter titled "Submarine Cable Protection and the Environment.” This publication aims to provide timely information for seabed users, the scientific community and general public who share the same goal as the ICPC—safeguarding submarine telecommunications and power cables worldwide. Topics covered have included the use of cables to monitor the ocean, impacts of space weather on seafloor cables, and the role of cables in a post-COVID world.

== Information sharing ==
The ICPC provides a forum for Members to interact and learn about legal, technical, and environmental developments relevant to submarine cables where areas of common interest are identified such that Members can benefit from working together and each other's expertise and real-world experience. To ensure information sharing external to the ICPC, affiliations are also developed with equivalent seabed user organisations from all over the world. Formal relationships with appropriate international organisations are also developed with the goal of information sharing.

== Projects ==
The ICPC engages in projects that are beneficial to the protection of submarine cable systems. For example, a global database showing fault causes and average repair times is developed and maintained, which has stimulated a range of applied and fundamental research projects with academic collaborators. Outcomes of this research have provided greater information on the frequency and nature of external threats for submarine cables, and has motivated follow-on research to understand how sediment and carbon are transported into the deep-sea. Research projects associated with the potential effects of submarine cables on the seabed environment are also performed to ensure harmony with the marine environment.

Research collaborations between the ICPC, cable companies and academic researchers led to the first measurements of powerful sediment avalanches triggered by river floods from the Congo River that ran out more than one thousand kilometres into the deep sea. These powerful flows damaged multiple seafloor cables offshore West Africa during the early stages of the 2020 COVID-19 lockdown and findings from this research are now implemented to design more resilient cable routes.

== Law ==
With guidance from its International Cable Law Adviser, the ICPC actively participates in the negotiation of oceans law treaties, advises Members on the treatment of cables under international law, and advocate for governments to adopt and implement their treaty obligations regarding submarine cable freedoms and submarine cable protection. It monitors the development and implementation of international agreements (particularly the United Nations Convention on the Law of the Sea) and national legislation and maintains law and regulation resources for consultation and use by its membership.

The ICPC has long supported and participated in the Rhodes Academy of Oceans Law and Policy, the premier oceans law institute for mid-career professionals that is sponsored by the University of New Hampshire that is held in Rhodes, Greece each July. The ICPC sponsors the annual Rhodes Academy-ICPC Submarine Cables Writing Award, which fosters scholarship in the area of submarine cables and the law of the sea, and its International Cable Law Adviser teaches annually at the academy.

The ICPC regularly conducts workshops with international and regional bodies, national governments, and marine industries to promote cable awareness and observance of international law and to reduce risks of cable damage.

The ICPC sponsored a reference handbook based on unique collaboration of 15 industry experts, scientists, and international law scholars that address critical legal and governance issues, as it pertains to submarine cables deployed around the world.

== Submarine telecommunication cables and the marine environment ==
The interactions between submarine cables and the marine environment are well documented in peer-reviewed scientific publications. The ICPC supports such research as a means of providing evidence-based analyses to assist cable protection in naturally hazardous regions and cable operations in environmentally sensitive areas. Briefly, cable/environmental interactions can be summarised as follows.

== Deep ocean (greater than 2,000 meters) ==
Over 80% of trans-oceanic telecommunications cables are in water depths >2000m. There, the risks posed by fishing and shipping (the main causes of cable damage and not from rumoured shark bites) are small. Accordingly, a typical cable is a 17-22mm diameter tube, the size of a domestic garden hose. It is composed of optical glass fibres, a copper power conductor and steel wires to add strength, all of which are encased in chemically inert, marine-grade polyethylene.

Cross section of a submarine telecommunications cable. # Polyethylene # Mylar tape # Stranded steel wires # Aluminium water barrier # Polycarbonate # Copper or aluminium tube # Petroleum jelly # Optical fibres

Laying is planned as a one-off operation in the 20-25 year life of a cable (note the operational life may extend to 30 or more years as improved signal processing has expanded the carrying capacity of some existing cables). Given their well proven design and low risk from deep ocean hazards, cables are subject to an average of four faults annually worldwide. However, fault numbers may spike under extreme events such as a large submarine landslide (see Natural Hazards below).

While studies of cables and their interaction with deep-ocean organisms are few, independent research from the continental shelf (0-130m average water depth) and the upper continental slope down to around 1200m, reveals little effect of modern cables on animals living on and under the seabed. No statistical differences have been observed regarding the abundance, composition and diversity of organisms living near and distant from submarine cables. Any observed changes are usually within the natural variability of the animals studied.

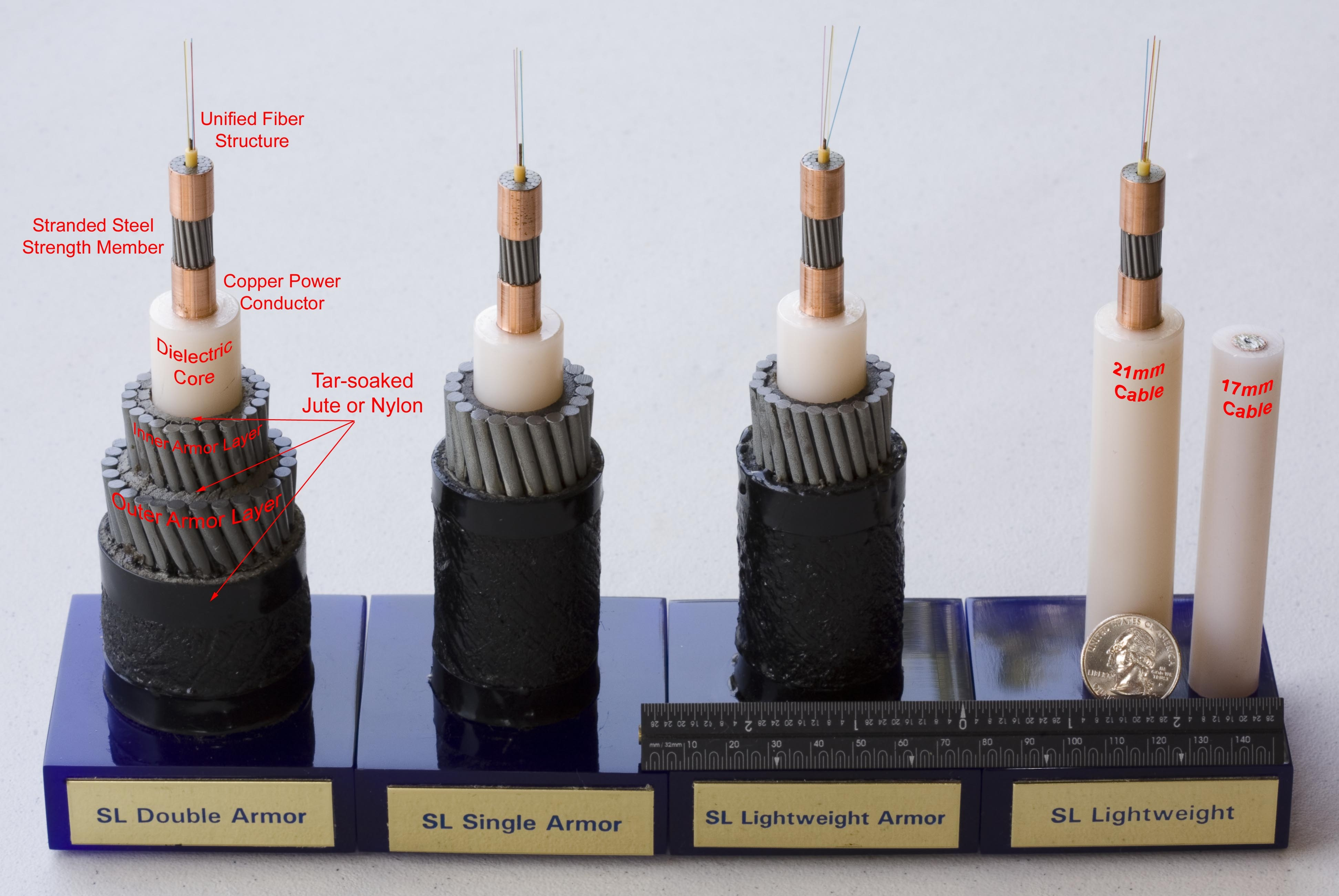
Samples of Submarine Telecom Cables

== Continental margin (less than 2,000 meters) ==
Aptly phrased the "urban sea,” this sector of the ocean is the focus of a wide range of human activities that include fishing, mineral exploration, shipping, dredging, renewable energy generation, scientific research as well as telecommunications. As a result, special measures are required to protect submarine cables. This includes (i) strengthening with steel wire armour, which increases cable diameter up to ~50mm, (ii) burial beneath the seabed and positive engagement with other seabed users to share information and knowledge regarding their respective industries.

Time-series observations of submarine telecommunications and power cables show that even when cables are buried, disturbance to benthic ecosystems is minor and temporary with the seabed returning to its natural state within months to years - the rate of recovery depending upon (i) the mode of cable deployment, (ii) wave and current regimes, (iii) rates of sediment supply to the ocean, (iv) seabed topography and geology and (v) biological activity. The continental shelf, where most cable repairs take place, is subject to waves, ocean currents and tides that restore the seabed back to its normal state on times scales of days (for strong tidal regions) to years.

Many submarine telecommunications cable systems have no live current at all (called unrepeatered systems) (generally cable routes or sections of telecommunications cable under c.300 km in length) and are unpowered and hence have no or negligible electromagnetic field. This length also varies as new technology allows longer unrepeatered sections; hence the future effects will be much smaller, which could be highlighted in the forward view. Repeatered (powered) telecommunications systems do have a live current, but electrical fields are shielded, and currents are markedly lower than power transmission cables—with an electro-magnetic field less than a laptop computer. Magnetic fields induced by fibre optic cable powering are on the order of 30 to 38 microtesla (μT) at the cable surface. These values are lower than the background magnetic field produced by the Earth (60 μT). At 1 metre from the submarine cable to the magnetic field would be .30 to .38 μT or 1/100th of what it is at the surface of the cable. This is therefore very different to power cables, with a zone of influence of centimetres.

== Natural hazards ==
Most cable faults result from human activities, (see “Submarine Cable Protection and the Environment") Collectively, these activities account for over 65% of cable faults and occur primarily in water depths <200m. Damage resulting from natural phenomena account for around <10% of all cable faults, but this percentage can spike during or shortly after a major event such as large earthquakes or typhoons when multiple cables can become damaged. On the continental shelf, waves and currents, especially those generated by storms, may abrade exposed cables and/or cause them to sway in the oscillating currents thus inducing fatigue. Those effects are minimised by cable armouring and burial beneath the seabed. Less frequent but nonetheless devastating are tsunamis such as the Great Tohōku Earthquake of 2011 that severely damaged Japanese coastal infrastructure. Such earthquakes may also generate submarine landslides and turbidity currents—sediment-laden currents that travel long distances (100s to 1000s kilometers) at high speeds (up to 68 kilometers/hour). These turbulent flows break cables in water depths down to 5000m and deeper. For example, offshore Taiwan and Algeria suffered earthquakes in 2006 and 2003 that caused 22 and 29 cable breaks respectively. Turbidity currents may also form when large quantities of sediment are delivered to the ocean, such as following major flooding resulting from typhoons. The discharged flood waters are so heavily laden with mud and sand that they sink to the seabed and move downslope to initiate cable-damaging turbidity currents. Other natural causes of cable faults include seabed currents, which can be vigorous even in very deep waters and gouging by floating ice. While such forces may be locally significant, worldwide they are minor compared to earthquakes and storms.

While volcanic eruptions account for only a handful of instances of damage to submarine cables, the eruption of the Hunga Tonga-Hunga Ha’apai volcano offshore Kingdom of Tonga in 2022 demonstrated how rare, but powerful eruptions can cause widespread damage and disrupt telecommunications in places that have few cable connections. As well as triggering an atmospheric shockwave that travelled three times around the world and a tsunami that reached as far as Peru, the eruption led to widespread damage of the only cable that connected Tonga to the global submarine cable network. This underlines the importance of diverse routes to improve network resilience.

Future climate change is likely to see an intensification of storms and offshore sediment transport in many regions, hence the ICPC takes an active interest in changing weather patterns and their influence on processes from the coast to the deep-sea.(see “Submarine Cable Protection and the Environment")
