= International Centre for the Prevention of Crime =

Non-governmental organization

The International Centre for the Prevention of Crime (ICPC, French: Centre international pour la prévention de la criminalité or CIPC, Spanish: Centro Internacional para la Prevención de la Criminalidad) is located in Montreal and is the only global non-governmental organization (NGO) focused exclusively on crime prevention and community safety.

== Organization history ==
ICPC was founded in 1994, initially by the governments of Canada, France and Quebec, and inspired by the work of the French Mayor Gilbert Bonnemaison, who was its first President. Its members now include a range of national and sub-regional governments from across the world, as well as a Board of international, regional and national organizations, cities, and a wide variety of non-government organizations and associations concerned with issues of crime prevention and community safety. Its work is also supported by an international Scientific Committee of experts in the field.

== Mission ==
The mission of ICPC is to promote safer and healthier societies and communities through the application of strategic and evidence-led programmes and initiatives which aim to reduce and prevent offending and victimization and to support international norms and standards, in particular the UN Guidelines on the Prevention of Crime (1995 and 2002). It encourages countries, cities and institutions to invest in prevention rather than relying on more costly criminal justice responses to crime.

It does this in three main ways:

1. through the collation of global knowledge about crime prevention developments and effective strategies and practices, including the development of compendiums of good practice, tool development, and comparative analysis of specific approaches and issues;
2. by promoting the exchange of information and experiences between policy makers, practitioners and researchers through seminars and regular colloquia on specific topics;
3. and by providing technical assistance on the ground. Its main working languages are English, French and Spanish.

Since it was created ICPC has worked closely with UN-HABITAT and its Safer Cities Programme in particular, and with the United Nations Office on Drugs and Crime (UNODC), both of which are members of the Centre. ICPC is also a member of the Programme Network Institutes affiliated with the UN Commission on Crime Prevention and Criminal Justice (CCPCJ), a network of institutions around the world which aim to assist Member States and the work of the Commission. In this capacity ICPC has supported the work of the Crime Commission including through the organization of workshops on crime prevention at the 10th, 11th and 12th UN Crime Congresses, and through the development of a crime prevention Handbook and an assessment tool. Similarly, ICPC has collaborated extensively with UN-HABITAT on the development of tools and reports including the recent Youth Resource Guide. It also works with the Inter-American Development Bank, the World Bank and the Organization of American States among others.

ICPC publishes, every two years, an international report on recent trends and developments in crime and in crime prevention and community safety, and has collaborated in a series of international meetings on crime trend observatories.

== Publications ==
- Annual Report 2009. ICPC: Montreal.
- International Report on Crime Prevention and Community Safety 2008: Trends and Perspectives. ICPC: Montreal.
- International Report on Crime Prevention and Community Safety 2010: Trends and Perspectives. ICPC: Montreal.
- Crime Prevention Assessment Tool. Cross-Cutting Issues 5. Criminal Justice Assessment Toolkit. (2009) UNODC: Vienna.
- Handbook on the crime prevention guidelines: Making them Work. (2010) UNODC/ICPC: Vienna.
- Youth Resource Guide. (2010). UN-HABITAT/ICPC. Nairobi.
