= CCGS John Cabot =

CCGS John Cabot is the name of two ships of the Canadian Coast Guard, honouring the Italian explorer John Cabot.

- CCGS John Cabot (2020) (id: 843969; callsign: CGDJ), launched 2020, participated in the search for the Titan submersible as the deep sonar search ship;
- CCGS John Cabot (1965) (id: 320951), launched in 1965, an icebreaker and cable ship, involved in the 1973 rescue of the crew of and raising the sunken Pisces III submarine, the deepest submarine rescue ever.

== See also ==
- List of equipment of the Canadian Coast Guard
- HMCS Cabot
- John Cabot (ship) ship index
- John Cabot (disambiguation)
- Cabot (disambiguation)
