= John Cabot (ship) =

John Cabot is a shipname. Several ships have held this name:

- SS John Cabot (hull number: 0395), a U.S. World War II Liberty ship; see List of Liberty ships (Je–L)
- CCGS John Cabot (2020) (id: 843969; callsign: CGDJ), a Canadian Coast Guard ship launched 2020, participated in the search for the 2023 Titan submersible disappearance as the deep sonar search ship;
- CS John Cabot (id: 320951), a Canadian ship launched in 1965, an icebreaker and cable ship, as a Canadian Coast Guard Ship CCGS John Cabot, involved in the 1973 rescue of the crew and raising the sunken Pisces III submarine, the deepest submarine rescue ever, as a Teleglobe ship CS John Cabot, laying down the CANTAT-3 transatlantic cable.

== See also ==
- CCGS John Cabot ship index
- List of equipment of the Canadian Coast Guard
- John Cabot (disambiguation)
