= Cabot =

Cabot may refer to:

== People and fictional characters ==
- Cabot (surname)

== Places ==
=== Canada ===
- Cabot Head, in Ontario
- Cabot Square, Montreal, Quebec
- Lac Cabot, Mauricie, Quebec; a freshwater lake (French: Lake Cabot)
- Cabot Strait, between Newfoundland and Nova Scotia
- Cabot Trail, a highway in Nova Scotia
- Cabot Tower (St. John's), Newfoundland
- Cabot Beach Provincial Park, Prince Edward Island

=== United States ===
- Cabot, Arkansas
- Cabot, Pennsylvania
- Cabot, Vermont
  - Cabot (village), Vermont
- Mount Cabot, in New Hampshire

=== United Kingdom ===
- Cabot, Bristol
- Cabot Square, London
  - Cabot Hall
- Cabot Tower, Bristol, England

== Outer space ==
- 7317 Cabot, an asteroid in the main belt

== Education-related ==
- Cabot Education Centre, Neil's Harbour, Nova Scotia, Canada, a secondary school
- Cabot Public Schools, Lonoke County, Arkansas, a public school district
- Cabot House, Harvard University, Cambridge, Massachusetts, a residential house
- Cabot Center, Boston, Massachusetts, the home of several Northeastern University athletics teams

== Businesses and organizations ==
- Cabot Company, later the Cabot Manufacturing Company, also known as the Cabot Mill, Brunswick, Maine, a former company
- Cabot Corporation, an American chemicals company
- Cabot Creamery, an American dairy cooperative
- Cabot's Ice Cream and Restaurant, Newtonville, Massachusetts, U.S.
- Samuel Cabot Incorporated, an American wood finishes manufacturer

== Ships and maritime facilities ==
- USS Cabot, several ships of the U.S. Navy
- HMCS Cabot, a Canadian Navy training facility
- CCGS John Cabot, two Canadian Coast Guard ships
- SS Empire Cabot, the Cabot, a British Second World War Empire ship
- Cabot 36, a Canadian sailboat

== Other uses ==
- Maria Moors Cabot Prizes, international awards for journalism

== See also ==
- Cabot, Cabot & Forbes, a real estate management firm in Boston, U.S.
- Cabot rings, thin strands found in red blood cells
- Cabot Cove, the fictional setting for the TV show Murder, She Wrote
- Annie Cabbot, colleague of the fictional Inspector Alan Banks
- Bingham v. Cabot (disambiguation), two Supreme Court of the United States opinions
- John Cabot (disambiguation)
