= CCGS Capt. Jacques Cartier =

Canadian research ship built in 2019

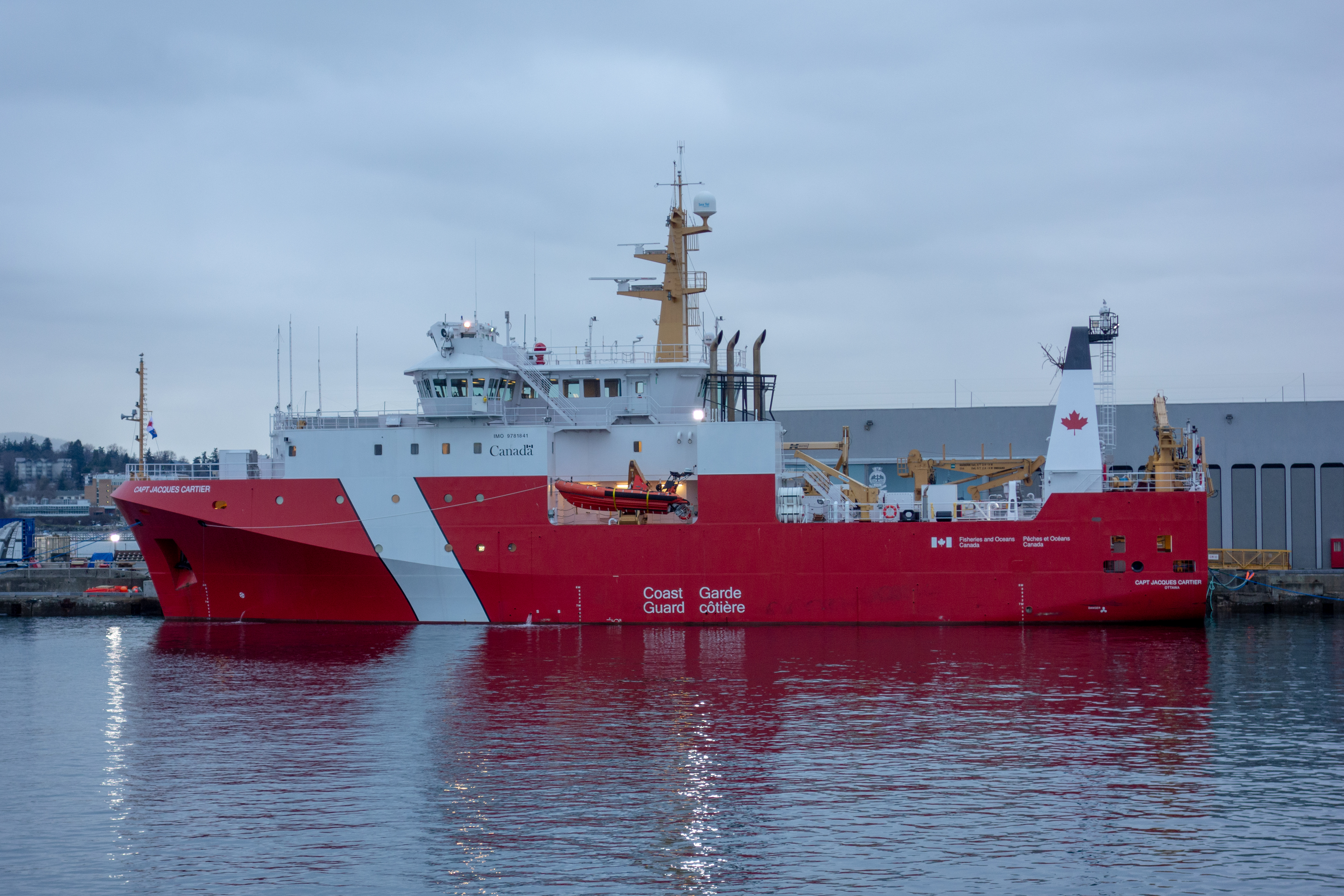
- CCGS Capt. Jacques Cartier docked at Ogden Point in Victoria, British Columbia

History

Canada
- Name: Capt. Jacques Cartier
- Namesake: Jacques Cartier
- Port of registry: Ottawa, Canada
- Ordered: 19 October 2011
- Builder: Seaspan Shipyard, North Vancouver
- Launched: 5 June 2019
- Identification: IMO number: 9781841; MMSI number: 316041123; Callsign: CFA3098
- Status: In service

General characteristics
- Type: Fisheries research vessel
- Displacement: 3,212 t (3,161 long tons)
- Length: 63.4 m (208 ft 0 in)
- Speed: 13 knots (24 km/h; 15 mph)

CCGS Capt. Jacques Cartier (Note: CCGS stands for Canadian Coast Guard Ship) is an offshore fisheries research ship of the Canadian Coast Guard. The ship was ordered in 2011 as part of the Canadian National Shipbuilding Strategy (NSS) as a replacement for aging Canadian Coast Guard vessels. Capt. Jacques Cartier is the sister ship of CCGS Sir John Franklin and CCGS John Cabot. The ship was constructed at Seaspan Shipyard, Vancouver, British Columbia and launched on 5 June 2019.

== Design and description ==
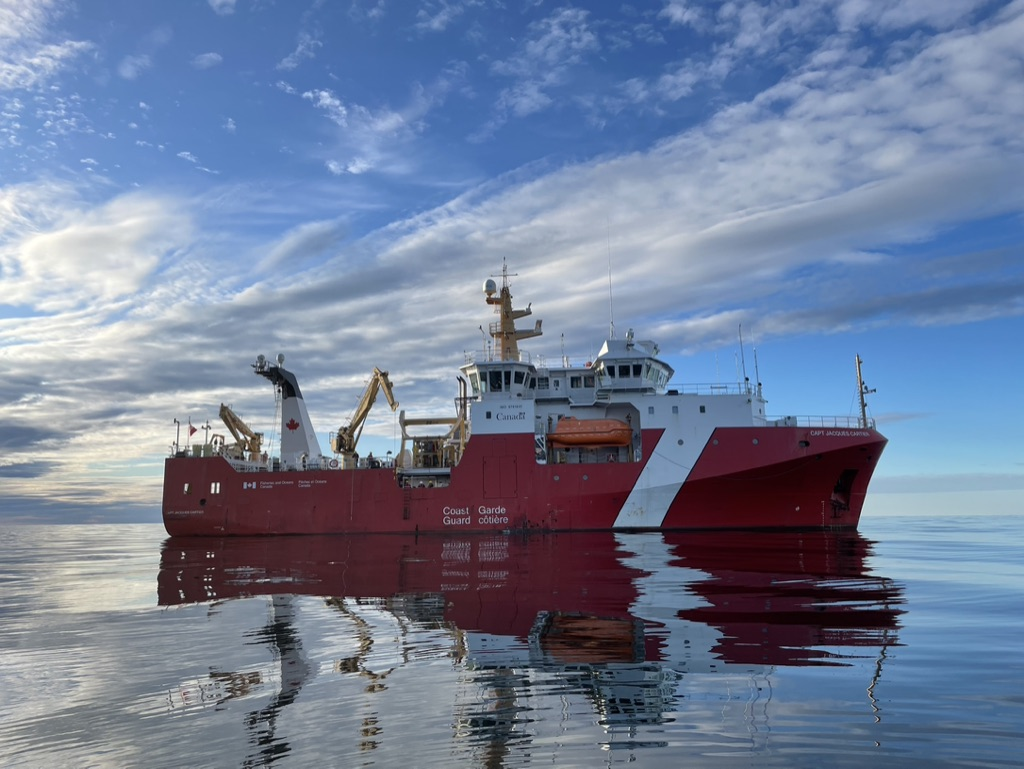
CCGS Capt. Jacques Cartier off Magdalen Islands, Quebec, Canada

Capt. Jacques Cartier is the second of three vessels ordered on 19 October 2011 by the Canadian government under the NSS for offshore fisheries research. The three vessels are intended to replace the aging CCGS Teleost, CCGS W.E. Ricker and CCGS Alfred Needler. The initial design for the research vessels called for a 55-metre (180 ft)-long ship that could act as "floating laboratories for scientific research and ecosystem-based management." However, when Seaspan received the technical plans from the government in 2012, they found that the ship's design would be prone to capsizing. The design was altered, leading to an increased design length of 63.4 m (208 ft 0 in) and a larger displacement of 3,212 metric tons (3,161 long tons), 610 metric tons (600 long tons) more than initially planned. The ships were constructed in 37 blocks and welded together. The research vessels are powered by a diesel-electric system giving the ships a maximum speed of 13 knots (24 km/h; 15 mph). The ships are equipped with four labs; a wet lab, a dry lab, an ocean lab and a control lab.

== Service history ==
The research vessel was constructed at Seaspan Shipyard, Vancouver, British Columbia and launched on 5 June 2019. The sister ship of CCGS Sir John Franklin and CCGS John Cabot, Capt. Jacques Cartier was named for Jacques Cartier, the French explorer who was the first European to land on the shores of the St. Lawrence River. After sea trials, Capt. Jacques Cartier will be assigned to the Canadian Coast Guard base at Dartmouth, Nova Scotia. Sea trials began on 10 October 2019. The vessel completed sea trials and was handed over to the Canadian Coast Guard on 11 December 2019. Capt. Jacques Cartier is home ported at Dartmouth, Nova Scotia.

However, after arriving in Nova Scotia, the vessel has been beset by a series of problems that have prevented Capt. Jacques Cartier from becoming operational. A series of malfunctions with the winches, sensors and engines, a shortage of spare parts and issues related to the COVID-19 pandemic have stopped the ship from performing the training and trials needed to be fully operational.

In June 2022, the ship began a planned maintenance period that included replacing bearings in a stern propeller tube that allows the propeller to turn smoothly. The problem was assessed as one common to all three vessels in the class. The refit was then extended by two months to address other issues. The extended refit was reported as unlikely to impact upcoming science programs on Capt. Jacques Cartier.
