= CCGS Sir John Franklin (2017) =

Canadian research vessel

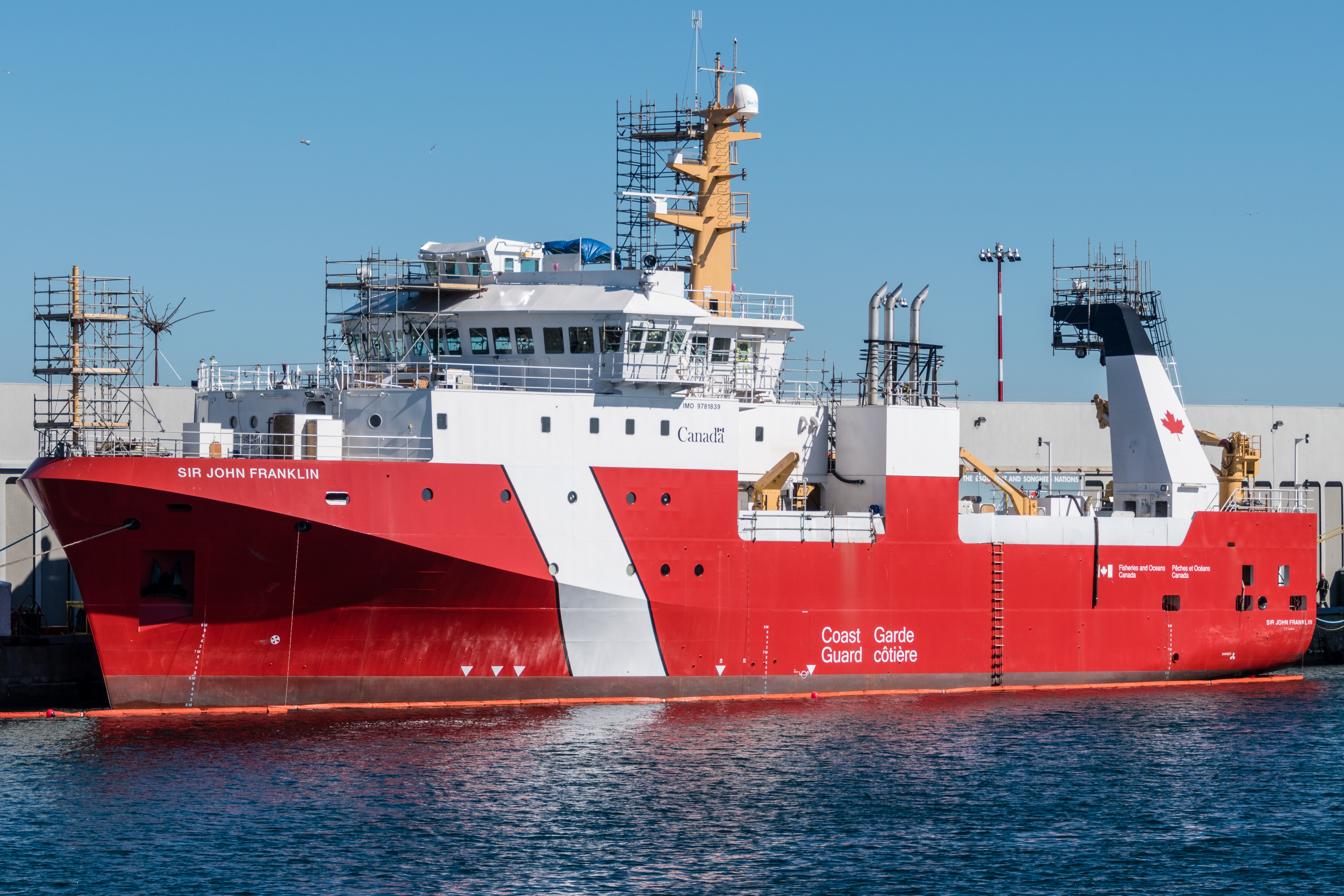
- CCGS Sir John Franklin docked at Ogden Point in Victoria, British Columbia, Canada

History

Canada
- Name: Sir John Franklin
- Port of registry: Ottawa, Canada
- Ordered: 19 October 2011
- Builder: Seaspan Shipyard, North Vancouver
- Laid down: 24 June 2015
- Launched: 8 December 2017
- In service: 27 June 2019
- Home port: CCG Base Patricia Bay (Pacific Region)
- Identification: IMO number: 9781839
- Status: In service

General characteristics
- Type: Fisheries research vessel
- Displacement: 3,212 t (3,161 long tons)
- Length: 63.4 m (208 ft 0 in)

CCGS Sir John Franklin (Note: CCGS stands for Canadian Coast Guard Ship) is an offshore fisheries research ship of the Canadian Coast Guard. The ship was ordered in 2011 as part of the Canadian National Shipbuilding Strategy (NSS) as a replacement for aging Canadian Coast Guard vessels. The ship was launched on 8 December 2017, named for Sir John Franklin, an arctic explorer who led two Royal Navy expeditions in search of the Northwest Passage, the second ending with the death of all his crew around 1848. The first of three vessels, Sir John Franklin is the sister ship of CCGS Capt. Jacques Cartier and CCGS John Cabot.

== Design and description ==
Sir John Franklin is the first of three vessels ordered on 19 October 2011 by the Canadian government under the NSS for offshore fisheries research. The three vessels are intended to replace the aging CCGS Teleost, CCGS W.E. Ricker and CCGS Alfred Needler. The initial design for the research vessels called for a 55-metre (180 ft 5 in)-long ship that could act as "floating laboratories for scientific research and ecosystem-based management." However, when Seaspan received the technical plans from the government in 2012, they found that the ship's design would be prone to capsizing. The design was altered, leading to an increased design length of 63.4 m (208 ft 0 in) and a larger displacement of 3,212 metric tons (3,161 long tons), 610 metric tons (600 long tons) more than initially planned. The ship was constructed in 37 blocks and welded together. The research vessels are powered by a diesel-electric system giving the ships a maximum speed of 13 knots (24 km/h; 15 mph). The ships are equipped with four labs; a wet lab, a dry lab, an ocean lab and a control lab.

== Service history ==
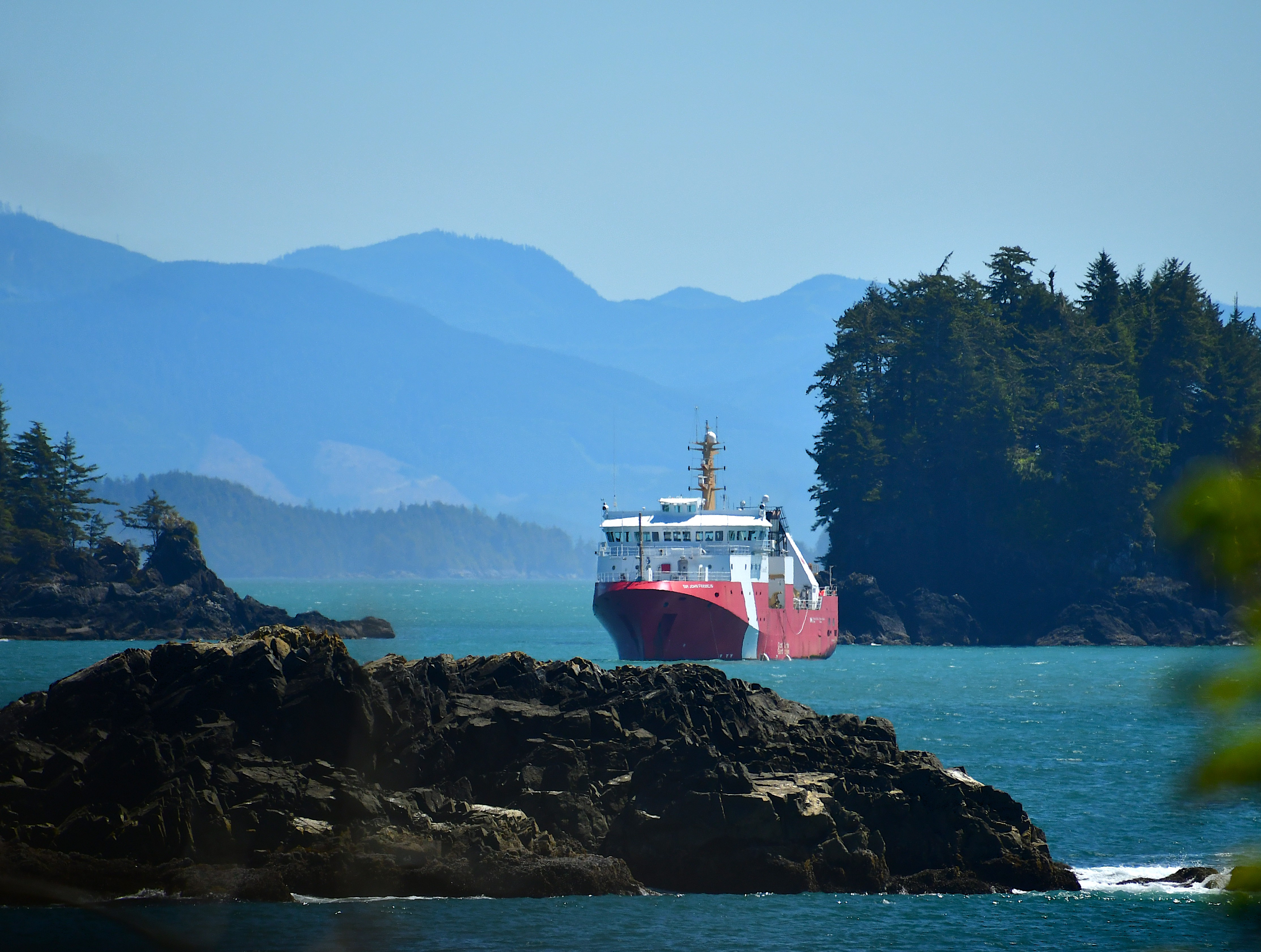
Sir John Franklin anchored in Ucluelet Bay, British Columbia, Canada

The ship was ordered in 2011 and construction began on the vessel at Seaspan Shipyards, in Vancouver, British Columbia on 24 June 2015. The ship was named for Sir John Franklin, an Arctic explorer, whose last mission into Canadian waters ended in death and failure. This is the second ship of the Canadian Coast Guard to be named for Franklin, with the first, CCGS Amundsen, carrying the name from her launch in 1979 until 2003. There was some displeasure with the chosen name for the ship, with some claiming that it celebrated failure. Others argued that Sir John Franklin epitomized the courage of exploration in the harsh conditions of Canada's north in the 19th century.

The ship was launched on 8 December 2017 at Vancouver. The vessel arrived at Victoria, British Columbia on 12 December 2017 to complete construction and perform sea trials. In August 2018 it was announced that, due to a number of welding faults totalling 44 metres (144 ft), the ship would be returned to the shipyard for re-welding. On 22 March 2019, during sea trials, the ship reversed at high speed into the Ogden Point breakwater. This damaged the propeller and rudder as well as denting the ship's hull and causing minor damage to the breakwater. The vessel was repaired in two weeks using parts from its sister ship, the incomplete John Cabot, and returned to sea trials on 15 April.

On 27 June 2019, Sir John Franklin was accepted into the Canadian Coast Guard fleet.
