= Trans Canada Microwave =

Microwave relay network in Canada

- Type: voice, television and teletype
- Location: Canada-wide
- Owner: Stentor Alliance
- Established: 1 July 1958; 68 years ago
- Commercial?: Yes

Trans Canada Microwave or Trans-Canada Skyway was a microwave relay system built in the 1950s to carry telephone and television signals from Canada's east coast to its west coast. Built across the nation, the towers ranged in height from nine metres high, to one in northern Ontario that was over 100 metres high. The system included 139 towers spanning over 6,275 kilometres and cost $50 million (equivalent to $555,000,000 in 2025).

== History ==
=== Origins ===
Canada was among the first countries to implement telephone service using a microwave relay system, when in 1948 a link between Nova Scotia and Prince Edward Island opened with a capacity of 23 telephone lines. This was followed in 1952 by a radio system between Halifax and Saint John, New Brunswick, with 46 channels.

Telephone usage grew explosively in the post-war era in Canada, and the country soon had the third largest number of telephones in the world despite its small population. More importantly, Canadians used their phones much more than any other nation, making an average of 411 calls per year. Existing long-distance lines would quickly be saturated, especially in the major markets. Studying the issue, Bell Canada decided to skip the use of coaxial cable connections being installed in the US, and concluded a microwave relay was the solution for rapidly improving the number of connections in these markets.

In 1952, the Canadian Broadcasting Corporation (CBC) issued a contract for a nationwide relay to send television and radio signals coast-to-coast. The contract was sent to both Bell and CNCP Telecommunications, the joint Canadian National Railway-Canadian Pacific Railway company that shared telegraph services. The Department of Transport, responsible for licensing bandwidth allocations in Canada, tried to have the two groups build a single shared network. CNCP agreed to the proposal, but Bell rejected it, at which point CNCP dropped their interest in the project. The Cabinet stepped in and passed a law stating that no company would be allowed a monopoly, at which point CNCP began plans for their own network concentrating in the heavily populated areas east of Manitoba.

=== First links ===
With Bell as the only remaining contender for the CBC network, plans began for the first major link from Toronto to Montreal via Ottawa. After discussions between Bell's president Thomas Wardrope Eadie and CBC's president Alphonse Ouimet, the network would also include a link to Buffalo, New York, to allow US television programming to be rebroadcast into the Toronto market.

The link went live on 15 January 1953, and the rest of the network to Montreal was completed in May the same year. The network was extended to Quebec City the next year, with branch links northward from the mainline to Peterborough and Barrie, and a short link southward to Kingston. The obvious value of the system, especially the Toronto-Montreal link, led Eadie to consider expanding the network into a trans-Canada system carrying television, teletype and telephone signals.

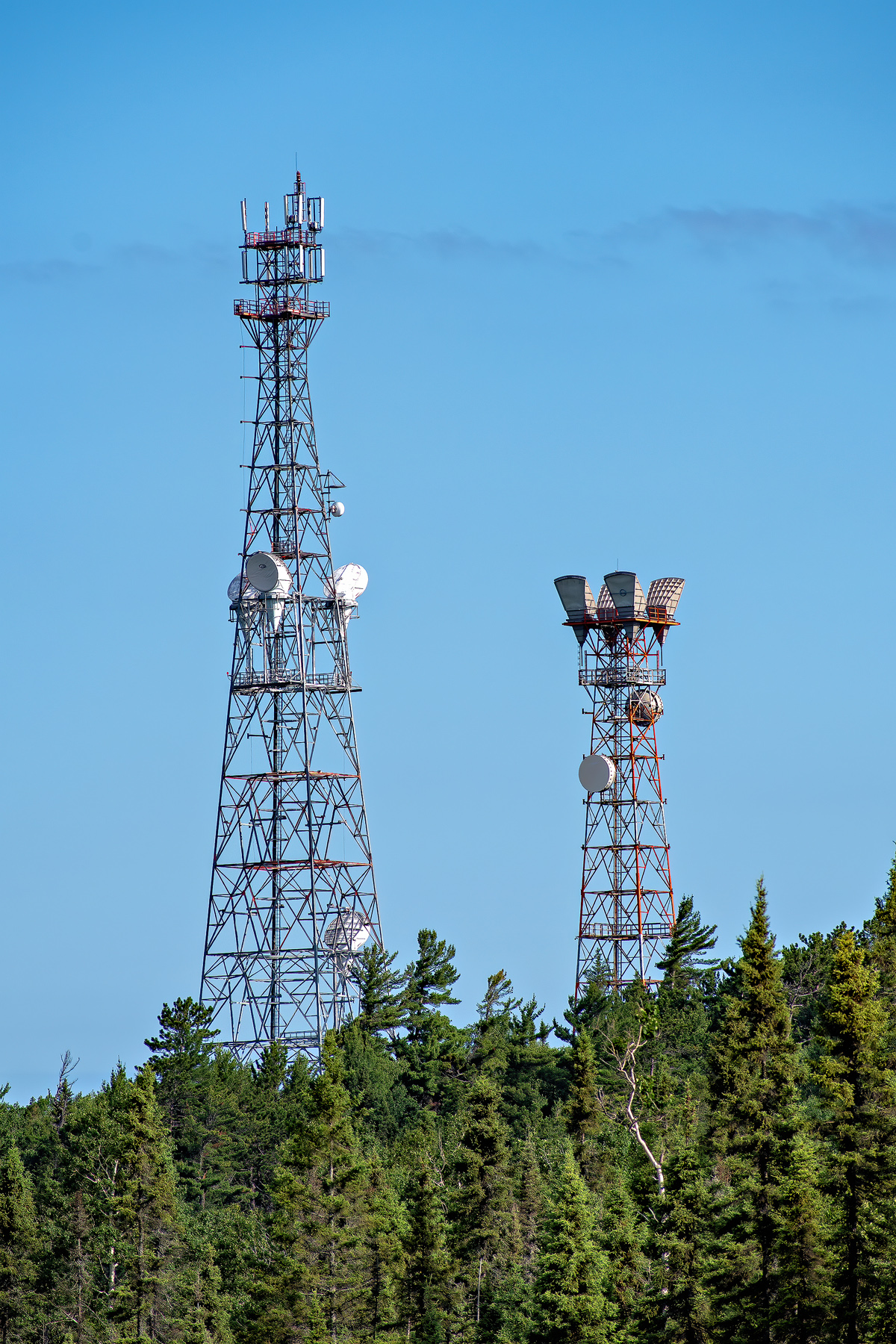
Latchford, Ontario - Rib Lake Microwave Repeater Towers. Righthand tower is the original TD-2 System, the lefthand tower carries TD-3 and cellular.

The network used the Bell Labs TD-2 system, built locally by Northern Electric, operating at base frequency of 4 GHz. It could carry twelve 10 MHz wide signals, producing six channels in both directions. In US service at that time, any one channel carried one television channel or up to 600 telephone conversations encoded using frequency division multiplexing (FDM). Bell upgraded their systems to add FDM to the television channels as well, allowing two 4 MHz signals to be carried in a single 10 MHz channel. They also added the ability to mix one television signal with addition telephone signals, which Bell referred to as "double decking". To lower the cost compared to the TD-2 system being deployed by AT&T in the US, Bell Canada used double decking where possible, simplified power supplies, and added a microwave frequency switch that allowed the same antennas to be used for broadcast or reception depending on the immediate needs of the network.

=== Cross-country expansion ===
The first links in Ontario and Quebec were within areas served entirely by Bell, but this was not the case for the rest of the network, where smaller regional telephone companies held local monopolies. This required additional planning, including deciding how to split up the costs and revenues. This was carried out within the Trans-Canada Telephone System company, which had formed to handle the same sorts of issues for land-line cost sharing and long-distance fees.

Construction of the cross-country network began on 8 March 1955. The system required a total of 139 stations, spaced at an average of 25 miles (40 km). The stations in the original core typically used squared-off parabolic reflectors, while later additions used horn-reflector antennas. Sites in the east were relatively easy to locate as they were already heavily developed, but in northern Ontario and especially the Rocky Mountains, aerial surveys were used to pick likely spots. Once selected, a temporary tower made of aluminium would be manually lifted into place and a small circular reflector hoisted to test the link and find the minimum altitude that gave it a good signal. Getting the equipment into position could be an enormous task; in one case at Morrissey Ridge in British Columbia, it took two months to bulldoze a road to the proposed site. Given this sort of delay, a new system was created in which a single workman would travel to the site and alert the next tower he was in place using a walky talky, then used a mirror to reflect the sun onto the next station to test the line of sight. This was sometimes done from a helicopter. The towers themselves were sized to the local terrain, with the largest, just over 350 feet (110 m) high, outside North Bay.

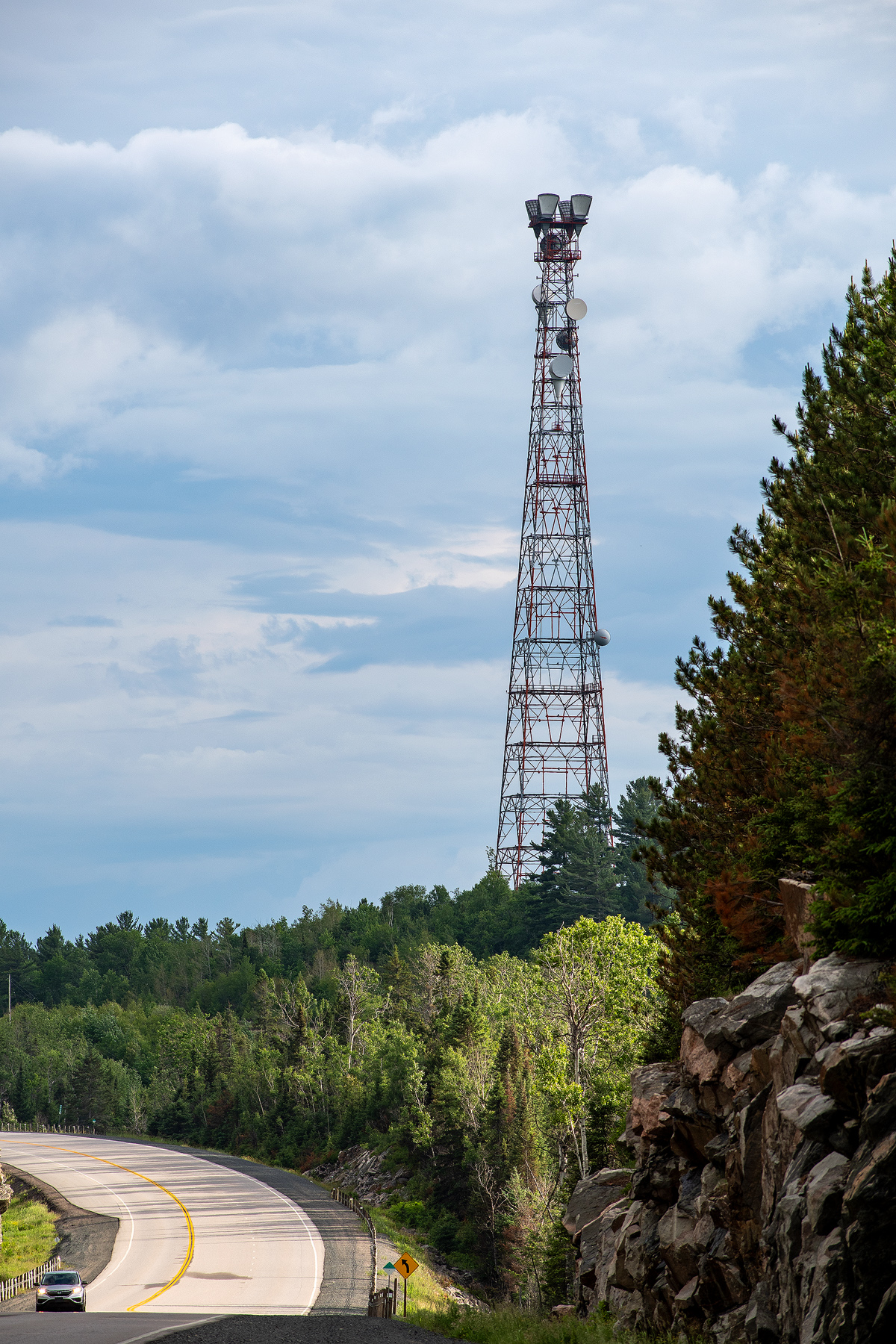
Olive Lake, Ontario microwave repeater tower with TD-2 horns on top and TD-3 horns lower down.

SaskTel was the first regional carrier to complete their assigned section of the system, which went operational in 1957. The entire system carried its first signals on 18 June 1958, and was declared officially operational on 1 July, Dominion Day. Stretching 6,400 km from Sydney, Nova Scotia to Victoria, British Columbia, it was the longest microwave relay in the world.

It was further extended to Newfoundland in 1959. To get it to Newfoundland, it was fed from Sydney, to a repeater in Cape North that was 427 metres above sea-level. That allowed it cross the 127 kilometres across the Cabot Strait to a repeater station perched 198 metres above sea-level in Red Rocks, Newfoundland and Labrador. From there, the signal was microwaved over land to St. John's.

The first television program played coast-to-coast was "Memo to Champlain", broadcast on Dominion Day. Among the many programs the network enabled was Hockey Night in Canada and a famous event held by CBC where people from across the country joined on television to sing Christmas carols live. It took just 20 milliseconds for a microwave signal to travel from one coast to the other.

=== Continued improvement ===
During the 1950s, CNCP concentrated on building a network in the more highly populated section of Canada, mostly in the area between Montreal and Toronto. This changed in 1962 when the CNCP received a contract from the Canadian Overseas Telecommunications Corporation (COTC) to build a second nationwide microwave relay system. COTC, a crown corporation, had formed to operate the CANTAT trans-Atlantic telephone cable in partnership with their counterparts in the UK, the General Post Office (GPO). Bell argued to the Department of Transport that allowing CNCP to extend their network would lead to wasteful overcapacity, before then noting they were in the process of setting up their own second line anyway. Cabinet once again intervened in CNCP's favour.

CNCP opened their new system between Montreal and Vancouver, the Transcontinental Microwave System, (Note: The same name was also used for Western Union's network.) in late 1964. The system used AT&T's higher-capacity TH system which was similar to the TD-2 system but operated at higher frequencies between 5,974 MHz and 6,404 MHz, using the same 118 MHz channel spacing. Rogers Communications bought 40% of the network in 1984 and increasingly took it over after that point. The railways eventually sold their stake in the system, which provided the early backbone for Rogers' cellular telephone network.

As traffic on the original network grew, Bell carried through on their own plans and built a second Skyway using the same TH system as the CNCP lines. In 1972, the network was upgraded with new digital routers, initially tested on the Ottawa-Montreal route, soon added in Edmonton and Calgary, and then expanded across the country. Customers sent data into the system using local leased lines or short-range microwave relay at 50 kbps which was then multiplexed with other customer streams using time division multiplexing, and then injected into the Skyway network at the nearest site. It was expected this would reduce the cost of transmission by about one-half compared to existing systems; using the network as a traditional analog system using modems required a conventional telephone call to be established between the sites, which might take 15 to 20 seconds, which might be more time than required to send the data. Data rates were also much higher than available using modems, and customers could share a single time slot by agreeing to only use the line at certain times. On its commercial release in February 1973 it was given the name The Dataroute.

=== Demise ===
The seeds of the demise of the network appeared in 1972 with the launch of Anik I, the world's first domestic geostationary communications satellite. Capable of carrying twelve television channels, compared to six for the TD-2 system, and able to cover all of Canada from a single satellite, Anik was much cheaper to operate in spite of the cost of launching the satellite to orbit. The original Aniks used the same 6 GHz frequencies as the TH system to make equipment interfacing easier, but the very low signal strengths from this pioneering satellite required large ground stations in remote locations to operate successfully. The network was continually expanded through the 1980s, adding higher frequencies on Anik B that reduced the ground antennas to about 2 metres (6 ft 7 in). These channels soon took over the entire television role from the Skyway.

The network remained in use for both data and voice, undergoing numerous upgrades to keep it effective in the era of satellites. This came to an end with the introduction of the first effective long-distance fibre optic cables in the 1970s. Although these required repeater stations every few kilometres, and thus were expensive to implement, they offered orders of magnitude more bandwidth than the microwave links. The first major all-fibre network was completed by SaskTel in 1984, with a total distance of 3,268 kilometres (2,031 mi) of lines linking 52 centres. By the late 1980s, fibre was being installed around the world, and by the 1990s any traffic formerly carried by the Skyway was moving to fibre.

== See also ==
- Microwave radio relay
- AT&T Long Lines
