= Roger Chapman (disambiguation) =

Roger Chapman is a musician.

Roger Chapman may also refer to:

- Roger Chapman (golfer) (born 1959), English golfer
- Roger Chapman (submariner), submariner rescued from sunken submersible Pisces III in 1973
- Roger Chapman (MP)
