= John Cabot (disambiguation) =

John Cabot (1450–1500; Italian: Giovanni Caboto; Venetian: Zuan Chabotto), was a Venetian explorer from Genoa for England

John Cabot may also refer to:

== Places ==
- John Cabot Building, St. John's, Newfoundland Island, Newfoundland and Labrador, Canada; see List of tallest buildings in St. John's, Newfoundland and Labrador
- John Cabot House, Beverly, Massachusetts, USA; an NRHP-listed building

=== Schools ===
- John Cabot University, Rome, Italy; a private university
- John Cabot Academy, Bristol, England, UK; a technical college secondary school
- John Cabot Catholic Secondary School, Mississauga, Ontario, Canada; a high school

== People ==
- John Moors Cabot (1901–1981), U.S. diplomat and ambassador to several countries
- John Cabot (1680–1742), founder of the Boston Brahmin Cabot family
- John Cabot (1744–1821), American privateer and sea captain, member of the Boston Brahmin Cabot family, namesake of the John Cabot House
- John Cabot (politician), American politician who contested in the 1796–97 United States House of Representatives elections
- John Cabot (American football), player of American football on the 2011 Penn State Nittany Lions football team

=== Fictional characters ===
- John Henry Cabot, a fictional character from Murder, She Wrote; see List of Murder, She Wrote characters

== Transportation and vehicles ==
- CCGS John Cabot, Canadian Coast Guard ships
- John Cabot (ship), a list of ships with this name

== Other uses ==
- Rosa 'John Cabot', the John Cabot shrub rose cultivar
- John Cabot (book), an 1898 book by George Parker Winship
- John Cabot: Early Explorer (book), a 2004 book by Wendy Mass
- "John Cabot: A Man of the Renaissance" (episode), a 1964 episode of the TV series History Makers (TV series)

== See also ==
- Giovanni (disambiguation)
- Cabot (disambiguation)
- John (disambiguation)
