= CANTAT =

Submarine communications cable

CANTAT is an acronym for Canada TransAtlantic Telephone Cable, a series of submarine communications cable systems linking Canada with the U.K. and later Europe. The first cable was a joint venture of Cable & Wireless and the Canadian Overseas Telecommunications Corporation (COTC) implementing national policies to establish a Commonwealth Round the World Cable System. The name has been applied to three systems.

== CANTAT-1 ==
CANTAT-1: Completed in 1961 by Cable & Wireless and Canadian Overseas Telecommunications Corporation (COTC). The system was installed in two segments as the first phase of the global system. The 2,072 nmi (2,384 mi; 3,837 km) transatlantic segment linked Oban, Scotland - Hampden, Newfoundland on White Bay. The second 400 nmi (460 mi; 740 km) undersea segment, linked by a 70 nmi (81 mi; 130 km) land line to the White Bay terminus and completing the link to mainland Canada, was laid between Corner Brook, Newfoundland - Grosses Roches, Quebec. The official inauguration of the system was on December 19, 1961 when Canadian Prime Minister John Diefenbaker answered a call from Queen Elizabeth II. It was decommissioned in 1974.

== CANTAT-2 ==
CANTAT-2: Completed in 1974 by the British General Post Office and Canadian Overseas Telecommunications Corporation (COTC). The 2,480 nmi (2,850 mi; 4,590 km) cable with 489 repeaters linked Beaver Harbour, Canada with Widemouth Bay, England. The cable was withdrawn from service in 1992 but the Canadian end was rerouted to Sable Island and recommissioned as SITIFOG 2000 until it was abandoned after developing a fault.

The work on the U.K. end of the cable involved an accident in which Pisces III, engaged in repeater burial of the newly laid cable on the shelf off Ireland, sank. The submersible sank in 1,575 ft (480.1 m) of water and was recovered with the crew safe after 76 hours.

== CANTAT-3 ==
CANTAT-3: The third CANTAT, operational 1994–2010, was a 3,836 nmi (4,414 mi; 7,104 km) system with a Canadian terminus in Nova Scotia and eastern termini at Vestmannaeyjar, Iceland, Tjørnuvík, Faroe Islands, Redcar in the U.K., Blaabjerg, Denmark to Sylt, Germany.

== See also ==
Commonwealth Pacific Cable System
