= Roger Chapman (submariner) =

British submariner and businessman (1945-2020)

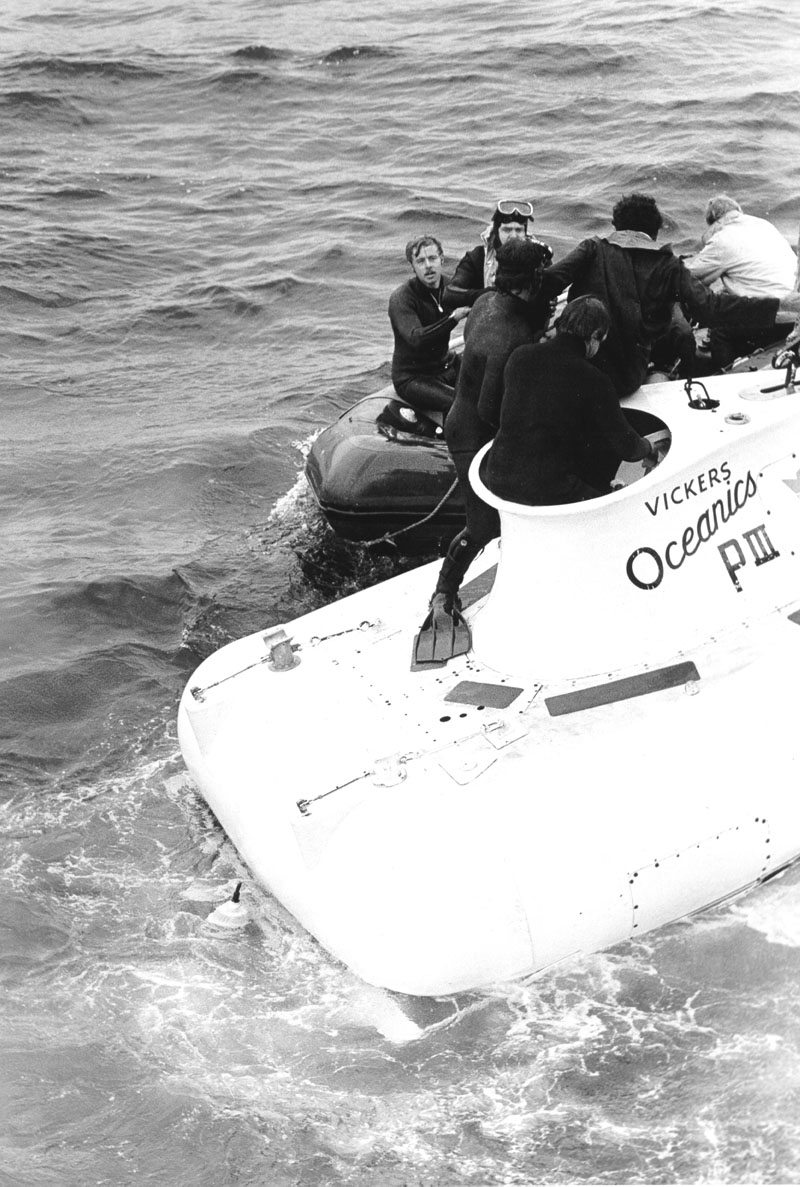
Pisces rescue

Roger Ralph Chapman, CBE (29 July 1945 – 24 January 2020) was a British submariner and businessman. A former Royal Navy lieutenant, Chapman was one of the two survivors of the deepest submarine rescue in history in 1973, when his small submersible Pisces III was lifted to the surface from a depth of 1,575 ft (480 m). The founder of the first all-electric ROV company, he later went on to designing submarines designed for rescue operations. Using one of his submarines, he successfully rescued 7 Russian sailors in 2005 for which he was awarded CBE in 2006.

== Biography ==
Born in Hong Kong in 1945, Roger Chapman joined the Royal Navy in 1963 and reached the level of lieutenant. He worked in submarines starting in 1967, but was later forced to retire due to worsening vision. Thereafter he founded a company to provide telephone cable laying services. It was the first UK all-electric remote underwater vehicle operator. The company was later acquired by Vickers Oceanics and he was kept on as a manager.

In 1971 Chapman married June Sansom, and they would go on to have two sons, Marcus and Sam.

In 1973, Chapman was aboard the small submersible Pisces III when it became trapped on the seabed at a depth of 1,575 feet (480 m), 150 miles (240 km) off Ireland in the Celtic Sea. The 76-hour multinational rescue effort resulted in the deepest successful submarine rescue in history. In 1975 he wrote the book No Time on Our Side about his experience.

Inspired by his experience, Chapman founded the submarine company Rumic in 1984, which designed and built the LR5 submersible for submarine rescue. In 2000, LR5 was mobilised to rescue the Russian submarine Kursk, but for political reasons was never deployed. Another Rumic submersible, Scorpio-45, was used to rescue the Russian deep submergence rescue vehicle AS-28 in 2005.

Chapman was appointed CBE in 2006 for services to shipping. After selling Rumic to James Fisher in 2002, he and his wife June founded the RUMIC Foundation, a children's charity.

In 2020, Chapman died of cancer.

== Bibliography ==
- Chapman, Roger (1975). No Time on Our Side. Sidney, B.C.: Gray's Pub. ISBN 9780888260598. LCCN 75-19154. OCLC 15758413.
