= CCGS John Cabot (1965) =

First icebreaking cable ship, 1965 to 2014

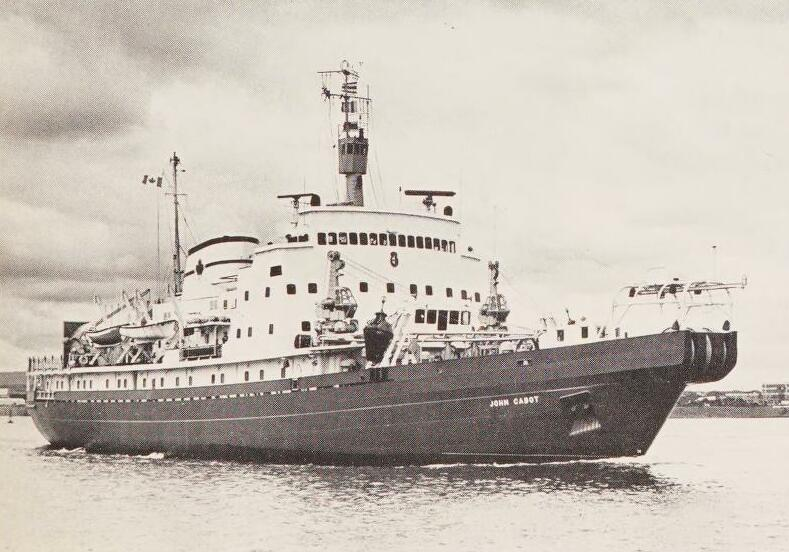
- John Cabot, 1973

History

Canada
- Name: CCGS John Cabot
- Namesake: John Cabot
- Owner: Canadian Coast Guard
- Ordered: 1962
- Builder: Canadian Vickers
- Christened: 31 May 1965
- In service: 1965
- Out of service: 1994
- Identification: Call sign: CGDJ

Canada
- Name: CS John Cabot
- Namesake: John Cabot
- Owner: Teleglobe Canada
- In service: 1994
- Out of service: 1997
- Identification: Call sign: VCGM

Italy
- Name: CS Certamen
- Owner: Elettra
- In service: 1997
- Out of service: 2010
- Identification: Call sign: IBUC; IMO number: 6514974

France
- Name: Certa
- Owner: France Telecom
- In service: 2010
- Fate: Broken up in 2014

General characteristics
- Class & type: Heavy icebreaker, cable repair ship
- Displacement: 5,097 tonnes (5,618 tons) (GWT); 5,234 tonnes (5,769 tons) (LDT)
- Length: 313.3 feet (95.5 m)
- Beam: 60.3 feet (18.4 m)
- Draught: 34.2 feet (10.4 m)
- Propulsion: diesel-electric twin-screw — 9,000 hp (6,700 kW) engine powering 4x 3,000 bhp (2,200 kW) generators driving 2x 4,500 shp (3,400 kW) propulsion motors
- Range: 16,000 kilometres (9,900 mi)
- Complement: 85
- Aviation facilities: Helicopter deck with telescoping hangar
- Notes: Cable capacity: 400 miles (640 km)

CCGS John Cabot (id: 320951;IMO number: 6514974; MMSI number: 247253000) was a Canadian Coast Guard heavy icebreaker and cable ship in service starting 1965. It passed out of CCG service and entered private service in 1994, as the cable ship CS John Cabot. In 1997, it was again renamed, becoming CS Certamen. The ship was scrapped in 2014, under the name Certa. It was the world's first icebreaking cable repair ship built. In 1985, it recovered the black boxes from Air India Flight 182. As of 2023, the John Cabot participated in the deepest submarine rescue ever performed, in 1973, retrieving Pisces III from the seafloor at 480 m (1,570 ft) and rescuing the crew of Roger Mallinson and Roger Chapman.

== Naming ==
=== John Cabot ===
The vessel was named after John Cabot, a Venetian explorer from the Age of Exploration. It was the first Canadian Coast Guard ship to carry the name "John Cabot" or "Cabot". The modern Canadian Coast Guard was founded in 1962. The John Cabot entered service in 1965.

=== Certamen ===
The ship passed into Italian service, and was renamed to Certamen, a different Italian name than it already had (John Cabot being the Italian explorer Giovanni Caboto). It carried the callsign IBUC. "Certamen" refers to competition in Latin.

=== Certa ===
When the ship was retired, it was renamed to Certa, and then scrapped. "Certa" refers to surety in Italian.

== Specifications ==
- LOA length: 313.3 ft (95.5 m)
- Width: 60.3 ft (18.4 m)
- Draft: 34.2 ft (10.4 m)
- GWT: 5097
- LDT: 5234
- Propulsion: diesel-electric twin-screw — 9,000 hp (6,700 kW) engine powering 4x 3,000 bhp (2,200 kW) generators driving 2x 4,500 shp (3,400 kW) propulsion motors
- Range: 16,000 km (9,900 mi; 8,600 nmi)
- Bow and stern stationkeeping thrusters
- Cable capacity: 400 mi (640 km)
- Helicopter deck with telescoping hangar
- Type: heavy icebreaker, cable repair ship
- Classification: 100A1 (Lloyd's)
- Ship's complement: 85
- Cost: $8,042,065 CAD

== History ==
The ship was ordered in 1962, and built in Montreal in 1964, by Canadian Vickers. It entered service in 1965 with the Canadian Coast Guard as CCGS John Cabot, callsign CGDJ It was christened John Cabot on 31 May 1965. On entry to service it was the only icebreaking cable repair ship in the world, and the first such to be built. The ship was sponsored by the Canadian Overseas Telecommunication Corporation (COTC), a Canadian Crown Corporation, and worked as part of the Department of Transport.

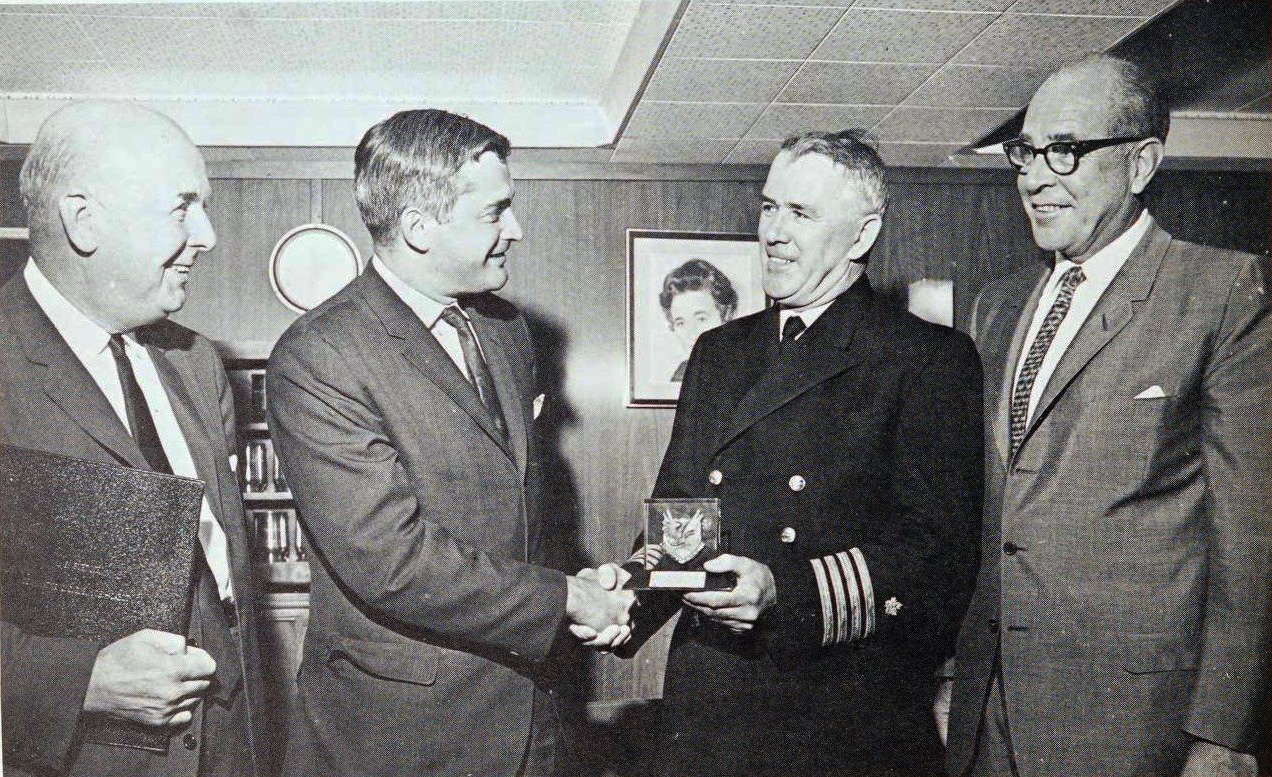
Captain Burdock receiving the Shield of NORAD while aboard CCGS John Cabot in 1966

In 1965 and 1966, the John Cabot repaired the submarine cable connecting Thule Air Base in Greenland to the rest of the world. For the efforts in repairing the telecommunications cable in November 1965, the ship's captain, Captain George S. Burdock, was awarded the Shield of NORAD in a ceremony on board CCGS John Cabot, while at dock in the Port of Montreal on 22 July 1966.

The John Cabot was one of the ships involved in laying the TAT-5 and SF System transatlantic cables in the 1960s.

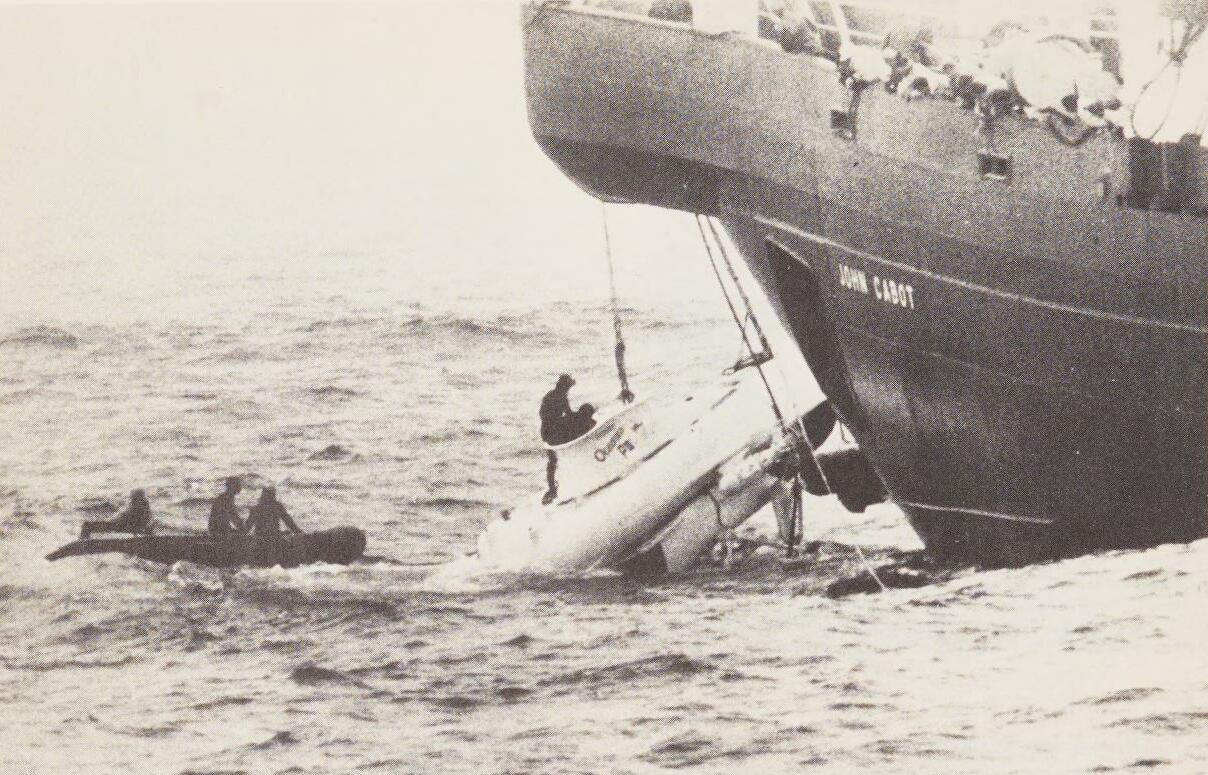
John Cabot during the rescue of Pisces III, 1973

In 1973, while laying the CANTAT-2 transatlantic cable, in coordination with several other ships, including the submarine Pisces III, the Pisces III sunk to the seafloor and needed rescue. John Cabot successfully fished up the submarine, rescuing the crew. The sub had been stuck at 480 m (1,570 ft), becoming the deepest submarine rescue ever.

In 1974, the ship suffered a major fire, and was refitted.

In 1983–1984, the ship underwent a midlife refit and modernization.

In 1985, the ship participated in the search for Air India Flight 182, and its underwater investigation and debris recovery. The ship successfully retrieved the airplane's black boxes from the seafloor at 2,000 m (6,600 ft) deep.

In 1994, Teleglobe Canada bought the ship from the Canadian Coast Guard, changing its prefix from CCGS (Canadian Coast Guard Ship) to CS (Cable Ship), becoming CS John Cabot, as a motorized ship, it was also called MV John Cabot. The callsign became VCGM

In 1996, the ship was purchased by McDermott and refurbished. It was sold to Elettra in 1997 and renamed to Certamen.

In 2010, Orange (France Telecom-Orange) acquired Elettra, and the Certamen was transferred to France Telecom.

In 2014, the ship was retired and renamed to Certa, and scrapped at Aliağa, Turkey.
