= Cabot (surname) =

Cabot is a surname that may refer to:

== People ==
- Cabot family, of the Boston Brahmins, or "first families of Boston"
- Bruce Cabot (1904–1972), American actor
- Dolce Ann Cabot (1862–1943), New Zealand journalist, newspaper editor, feminist, and teacher
- John Cabot (c. 1450–c. 1499), Italian navigator and explorer, father of Sebastian Cabot
- Godfrey Lowell Cabot (1861–1962), American industrialist who founded the Cabot Corporation
- George Cabot (1752–1823), American merchant, seaman, and politician
- John Moors Cabot (1901–1981), American diplomat and ambassador, son of Godfrey Lowell Cabot
- Meg Cabot (born 1967), American author
- Pilar Cabot (1940–2017), Catalan writer
- Ricardo Cabot (footballer) (1885–1958), Spanish footballer
- Ricardo Cabot Boix (1917–2014), Spanish field hockey player and son of the above
- Ricardo Cabot (field hockey, born 1949), Spanish field hockey player
- Richard Clarke Cabot (1868–1939), American physician and pioneer in social work
- Sebastian Cabot (actor) (1918–1977), British actor
- Sebastian Cabot (explorer) (c. 1474 – c. 1557), Italian explorer of the Americas, son of John Cabot
- Susan Cabot (1927–1986), American actress
- Thomas Dudley Cabot, American businessman and conservationist

== Fictional characters ==
- Alexandra Cabot, in the Law & Order universe
- John Henry Cabot, a fictional character from Murder, She Wrote; see List of Murder, She Wrote characters
- Leigh Cabot, from Stephen King's 1983 novel Christine
- Rosanna Cabot, in the soap opera As the World Turns
- Tarl Cabot, protagonist of Gor novels
- William Cabot, in the film The Sum of All Fears
- Ephraim Cabot, in the play Desire Under the Elms by Eugene O'Neill

== See also ==
- Cabot Rea, American reporter and TV news anchorman
