= Alfred Needler =

Canadian scientist and diplomat (1906–1998)

Alfred Walker Holinshead Needler CM OBE FRSC (1906 – 4 September 1998) was a Canadian scientist, administrator, diplomat and statesman. Alfred Needler was instrumental in establishing research for estimating large migratory marine fish populations from small samples, as well as making contributions toward Canada's participation in the International Commission for the Northwest Atlantic Fisheries (ICNAF) and later chairing the new international convention that established the Northwest Atlantic Fisheries Organization (NAFO).

== Education and career ==
Born in Huntsville, Ontario, Alfred Needler attended the University of Toronto beginning in 1922, where he was influenced by the pioneer Canadian oceanographer and fishery biologist Professor A.G. Huntsman, who encouraged Needler to pursue a career in fishery research. Needler completed undergraduate and graduate studies during the 1920s; his doctorate research was based at the Atlantic Biological Station in St. Andrews, New Brunswick during the summers, although much of his work took him to fishing ports of Nova Scotia, where he boarded with fishing families and understood the economic and social impact of marine resources.

Upon graduation, Needler entered public service, joining the federal Department of Marine and Fisheries and was appointed to head the oyster farming research centre at Ellerslie, Prince Edward Island. In 1941, Needler succeeded Huntsman as the director of the Atlantic Biological Station in St. Andrews.

In 1943, Needler was a Canadian delegate to the London Conference on the post-war international regulation of the Northwest Atlantic Fisheries. In 1949, Needler was a Canadian delegate to the Washington Conference, which resulted in the creation of the ICNAF.

From 1948 to 1950, Needler served as assistant deputy minister of Fisheries and also served as the first chairman of the ICNAF's Standing Committee on Research and Statistics (STACRES).

In 1954, Needler was appointed director of the Pacific Biological Station in Nanaimo. During his time on the west coast, Needler served as a Canadian delegate to the International North Pacific Fisheries Commission (INPFC) in the late 1950s and early 1960s.

In 1963, Needler was appointed to the most senior civil service appointment in the Department of Fisheries, becoming deputy minister of Fisheries. As deputy minister (and in retirement), Needler served as the Canadian commissioner to ICNAF from 1966 to 1977, and as the vice-chairman and then chairman of the ICNAF from 1967 to 1969 and 1969 to 1971 respectively.

Needler retired from the civil service in 1971 to return to St. Andrews.

== Retirement ==
In his retirement, Needler served as the first executive director from 1971 to 1976 of the Huntsman Marine Laboratory, a joint-venture educational research facility in St. Andrews centred on the Atlantic Biological Station and funded by universities and governments.

Needler served as a senior fisheries advisor to the Canadian Delegation at the third Conference on the Law of the Sea (UNCLOS-III) which resulted in coastal states extending fisheries jurisdiction to the 200-nautical-mile (370 km) Exclusive Economic Zone.

Needler was made a Member of the Order of the British Empire, a Member of the Order of Canada, and a Fellow of the Royal Society of Canada.

In 1982, the Department of Fisheries and Oceans named a fisheries research vessel after him which continued to serve the Government of Canada as the CCGS Alfred Needler, until it was decommissioned in 2023.

Needler died in St. Andrews, New Brunswick on September 4, 1998.
