= CCGS Wilfred Templeman =

History

Canada
- Name: Wilfred Templeman
- Operator: Canadian Coast Guard
- Builder: Ferguson Industries Ltd, Pictou
- Launched: 24 November 1980
- Commissioned: March 1982
- Decommissioned: 2008
- Home port: CCG Base St. John's
- Identification: IMO number: 7907099; Call sign: CGDV
- Fate: Sold, 2011
- Name: Blain M
- Acquired: 2011
- Status: in active service

General characteristics
- Type: Fisheries research vessel
- Tonnage: 925 GT
- Length: 50.3 m (165 ft 0 in)
- Beam: 11 m (36 ft 1 in)
- Draught: 4.9 m (16 ft 1 in)
- Propulsion: 1 × Diesel engine, 1,970 bhp (1,470 kW)
- Speed: 11 knots (20 km/h)

CCGS Wilfred Templeman (Note: CCGS stands for Canadian Coast Guard Ship) was a Canadian Coast Guard fisheries research vessel that entered service 1981 with the Department of Fisheries and Oceans. In 1995 the Fisheries and Oceans and Canadian Coast Guard fleets were amalgamated and Wilfred Templeman joined the Canadian Coast Guard. The research vessel patrolled the coast off Newfoundland and Labrador. In 2011, the vessel was taken out of service, sold to commercial interests and renamed Blain M.

== Design and description ==
Wilfred Templeman is of a stern commercial trawler design, similar to CCGS Alfred Needler with different machinery, power and speed. The ship is 50.3 m (165 ft 0 in) long overall with a beam of 11 m (36 ft 1 in) and a draught of 4.9 m (16 ft 1 in). The vessel has a 925 gross tonnage (GT). The ship is powered by a diesel engine driving one controllable pitch propeller creating 1,970 brake horsepower (1,470 kW). This gives Wilfred Templeman a maximum speed of 11 knots (20 km/h; 13 mph).

== Service history ==
Constructed in 1981 by Ferguson Industries Ltd at their yard in Pictou, Nova Scotia with the yard number 210, the ship entered service with the Department of Fisheries and Oceans in March 1982. (Note: Sources disagree on when the vessel entered service. Maginley & Collin state it was 1981 while Saunders and the Miramar Ship Index state it was 1982. This discrepancy can occur when one source cites the launch date issued by the builder and another source references a later date when the vessel was officially put into service by the Coast Guard after staffing, training and verification of fit for station.) The vessel was named for Wilfred Templeman, a marine biologist from Newfoundland and Labrador who was director of the Fisheries Research Board' biological station at St. John's. In 1995, in an effort to combine tasks, administration and making savings in both ships and funds, the Fisheries and Oceans and Canadian Coast Guard fleets were merged under the command of the Canadian Coast Guard. Wilfred Templeman was given the new prefix CCGS as a result. The ship was registered in Ottawa, Ontario but homeported at St. John's. During the Turbot War, Wilfred Templeman escorted the Spanish fishing trawler Estai to St. John's after the Spanish ship was detained for illegal fishing on the Grand Banks of Newfoundland.

In 2008, Wilfred Templeman was taken out of service by the Canadian Coast Guard. The research vessel was considered too old to be of much more use. In September 2009 the Department of Fisheries and Oceans announced invitations for contracts to replace several of the Coast Guard research vessels, including Wilfred Templeman.

In July 2011, Wilfred Templeman was advertised for sale, and was eventually sold for $371,956.55 to McKeil Work Boats of Hamilton, Ontario. The ship was re-registered under the name Blain M in March 2012.
