= Rescue of Roger Mallinson and Roger Chapman =

1973 submersible crew rescue

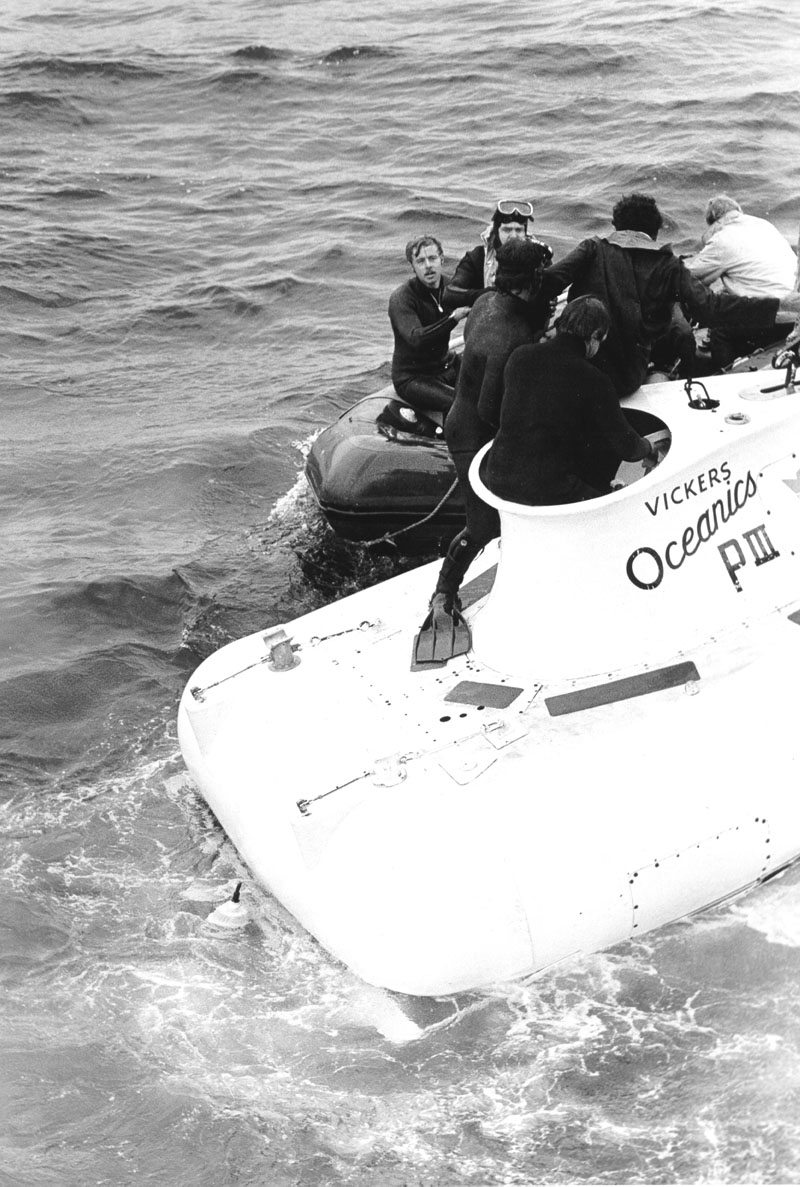
- Divers assist rescued pilots from Pisces III.
- Location in Atlantic SW of British Isles
- Date: 1 September 1973
- Location: Celtic Sea; 50°9′15″N 11°7′7″W
- Cause: Flooded submersible
- Participants: Roger Mallinson and Roger Chapman
- Outcome: Successful rescue of two pilots

Between 29 August and 1 September 1973, Roger Mallinson and Roger Chapman were successfully rescued 150 miles (240 kilometres) from Ireland in the Celtic Sea, after their Vickers Oceanics submersible, Pisces III, became trapped on the seabed at a depth of 1,575 feet (480 metres). The 76-hour multinational rescue effort resulted in the deepest successful submarine rescue in history.

== Submersible and the crew ==
The Canadian commercial submersible Pisces III measured 20 feet long by 7 ft wide by 11 ft high (6 by 2 by 3 metres). It was built by International Hydrodynamics of North Vancouver, British Columbia, and had been launched in 1969. Pisces III originally had tail fins, which were removed to improve access and handling when the submersible was purchased by Vickers Oceanics. Had the fins been retained, they would have prevented the entanglement of the towline on the craft's machinery sphere, which caused the 1973 accident.

Pisces III had sunk once before, during sea trials in Vancouver Bay in 1971. Peter Messervy of Vickers Oceanics, who would lead the rescue team after the 1973 accident, was one of the pilots who was rescued by the Canadian Defence Ministry submersible SDL-1.

The Pisces III submersible was crewed by 28-year-old pilot Roger Chapman, a former Royal Navy submariner, and 35-year-old engineer and senior pilot Roger Mallinson. Chapman had been invalided out of the Royal Navy due to less-than-perfect eyesight.

== Accident ==
In the early hours of 29 August 1973, Chapman and Mallinson began Dive 325 of the Pisces III. They were working on laying transatlantic telephone cable on the seabed, about 150 miles (130 nautical miles; 240 kilometres) southwest of Cork in southern Ireland. Their job entailed an eight-hour shift in the six-foot (two-metre) diameter submersible, which moved along the seabed using water jets to disperse the mud and lay cable, then cover over the cables. The submersible would usually take about 40 minutes to descend to a depth of 1,600 feet (500 metres).

For Mallinson, the dive was additionally fatiguing as he had spent over a day previously repairing a broken manipulator on the submarine. During the repair, he changed the oxygen tank for a full one. During each dive, the pilots had to ensure that after every 40 minutes they turned on a rebreather fan to remove carbon dioxide from the atmosphere and add additional oxygen. Additionally, they maintained a video commentary record during every dive.

Shortly after 9 a.m., with the submersible about to be lifted out of the water and back onto the ship with a towline, a water alarm sounded in the aft sphere, a self-contained part of the submersible containing machinery and oil storage. The towline had apparently fouled on the aft sphere hatch and wrenched it open. The crew heard the sound of water entering the aft compartment as Pisces III became inverted and began to sink back to the seabed. The aft sphere was fully flooded with over a tonne of water.

At a depth of 175 ft (55 m), the submersible jolted to a stop – held at the maximum length of the nylon towline. The crew swung about in the sea currents until the rope snapped. The pilots immediately closed down all the electrical systems, leaving the submersible in total darkness. They also managed to release a 400 lb (180 kg) lead ballast weight as they descended. They impacted the sea floor at 9:30 a.m., at a speed later judged to be 40 mph (20 m/s; 65 km/h).

== Initial contact ==
Using a torch (flashlight), the crew was able to review their surroundings and also called their mother ship to update them. The full tank of oxygen Mallinson had added had a capacity to last about 72 hours, but 8 hours had already been used, leaving 64 hours.

Mallinson and Chapman spent the first few hours sorting out the submersible, which was almost upside down. They checked all the watertight doors for leaks and prepared for rescue to come. To preserve oxygen, they knew they had to make as little physical exertion as possible, even extending to speaking. They made themselves as comfortable as possible as high up in the submersible as they could get to avoid the foul air that sank to the submersible's bottom.

The only food items on board were a single sandwich and one can of lemonade. They also decided to allow the carbon dioxide in the air to build up beyond the normal 40 minutes to conserve oxygen, which resulted in lethargy and drowsiness for both men.

== Rescue efforts begin ==
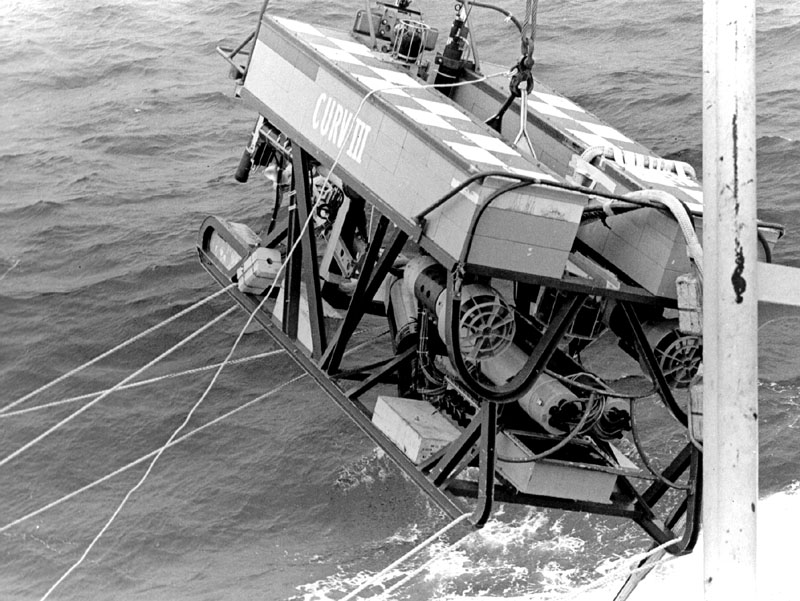
U.S. Navy CURV-III during Pisces III rescue

At 10:35 a.m., the support ship Vickers Venturer, then in the North Sea, was ordered to return to the nearest port with the submersible Pisces II aboard (which could be removed and flown to Ireland). Additionally, at midday the Royal Navy survey vessel HMS Hecate steamed to the accident location to offer assistance with special ropes. The United States Navy offered a submersible belonging to the US Salvage Department, called a Controlled Underwater Recovery Vehicle (CURV-III), which was sent from California, while the Canadian Coast Guard ship John Cabot left from Swansea.

On 30 August 1973, the Vickers Voyager arrived in Cork Harbour at 8:15 p.m. and loaded the submersibles Pisces II and Pisces V, which had been flown in overnight. The ship left Cork at 10:30 p.m.

At 2 a.m. on 31 August 1973, the Vickers Voyager reached the scene and launched Pisces II with a polypropylene rope attached. However, the lifting rope broke free of the manipulator arm and the submersible had to return to the surface for repairs. An attempt made by Pisces V failed to find the crashed Pisces III and Pisces V returned to the surface after it ran out of power. Pisces V was relaunched and had more success, finding the crew at 12:44 p.m. However, an attempt to attach a rope failed. Pisces V now remained with the stricken Pisces III. An attempt to send Pisces II down again had to be called off when it suffered a leak.

The newly arrived CURV-III aboard John Cabot was also unable to launch due to an electrical fault. Just after midnight, Pisces V was ordered to the surface, leaving the men on Pisces III once again alone. They were running out of both oxygen and the lithium hydroxide needed to scrub carbon dioxide from the deteriorating atmosphere in the submersible. Both men were cold, wet, and suffering from severe headaches.

== Rescue ==
The rescue operation of Pisces III commenced early on 1 September 1973. The rescue submersible Pisces II was deployed at 4:02 a.m., and within a little over an hour, by 5:05 a.m., it had successfully attached a purpose-built toggle and polypropylene tow rope to the rear sphere of the distressed Pisces III.

The CURV-III, a remotely operated underwater vehicle, also joined the operation. At 10:35 a.m., it managed to fasten another tow rope to the stranded submersible. At this point, the crew of Pisces III consumed their only available food and drink on board.

The lifting of Pisces III began at 10:50 a.m. This procedure caused the submersible to jolt significantly, further disorienting the crew. The lift was temporarily halted at a depth of 350 ft (100 m) to disentangle the CURV-III. At 100 ft (30 m), the lifting process was paused again to allow divers to attach heavier lifting cables to the submersible.

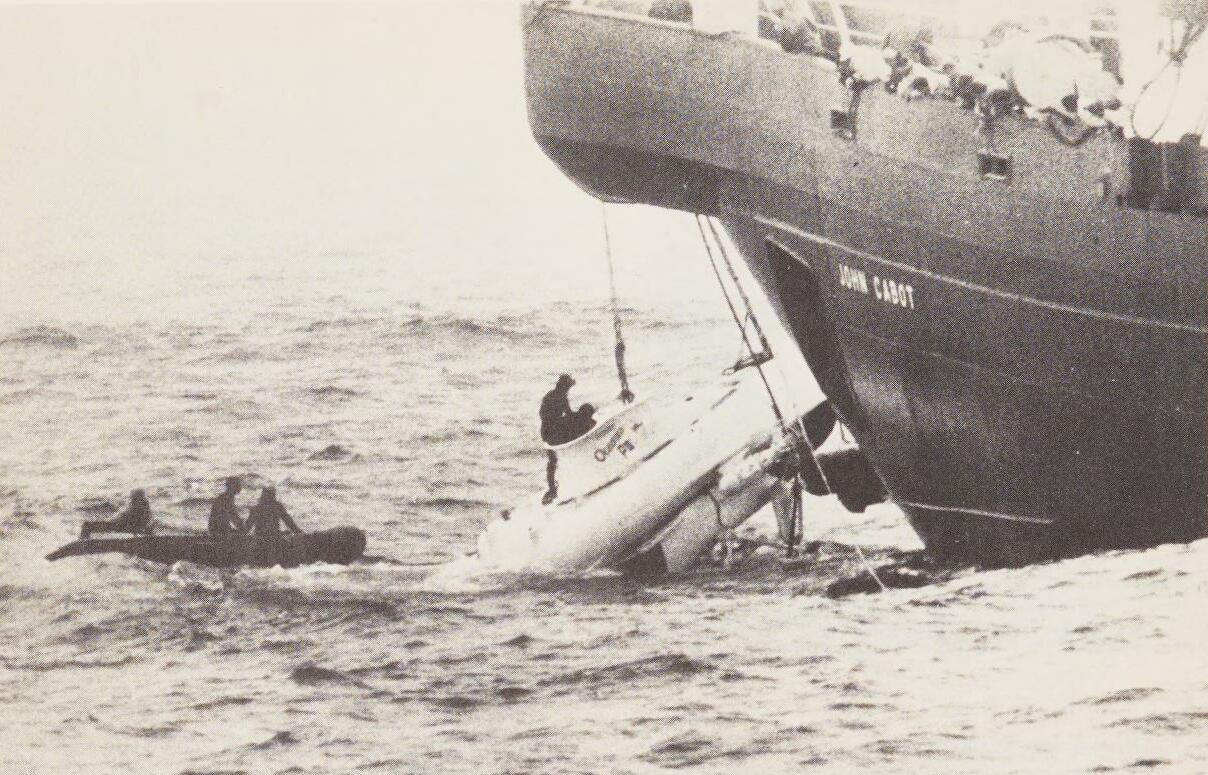
CCGS John Cabot during the rescue of Pisces III

At 1:17 p.m., Pisces III finally broke through the surface. Divers immediately attempted to open the hatch to allow fresh air into the submersible. However, it took nearly 30 additional minutes to achieve this. When the hatch finally opened, both crew members struggled to leave the craft, having been confined inside for a total of 84 hours and 30 minutes. Subsequent evaluations revealed that a mere 12 minutes of oxygen supply remained in Pisces III. Reflecting on the close call, author R. Frank Busby later stated, "... the crew of Pisces III can be thankful they were not 250 miles, rather than 150 miles from Cork."

In 1975, Chapman published an account of his rescue in his book titled No Time on Our Side.

== BBC dramatisations ==
No Time on Our Side, adapted from Roger Chapman's book for Radio Four by James Follett, was first broadcast on 2 June 1976.‍ In addition, "Mayday for Pisces III", an episode of BBC One's series Life at Stake, was shown on 24 February 1978.‍

== Movie adaptation ==
In August 2013, it was announced that a film depicting the events of the rescue was in development, possibly starring Jude Law and Ewan McGregor. In July 2021, Mark Gordon Pictures acquired the rights to adapt Stephen McGinty's book based on the rescue, The Dive, into a film.

== See also ==
- LR5 – rescue submersible designed by Roger Chapman
- Titan submersible implosion – 2023 maritime disaster
