= History Makers (TV series) =

- Genre: Historical
- Country of origin: Canada
- Original language: English
- No. of seasons: 1
- No. of episodes: 17

Production
- Production company: National Film Board

History Makers is a documentary film series of biographies of Canadian politicians by various directors originally produced in from 1959 to 1964 in anticipation of the Centennial of Confederation by the National Film Board and later aired on CBC Television in 1970.

== Production ==
Seventeen episodes, depicting Canada from pre-Confederation to the 1950s, were produced by the National Film Board with each costing around $40,000 for the Canadian Centennial. Donald Creighton and Guy Frégault reviewed the historical research and scripts. Louis-Joseph Papineau: The Demi-God and Louis-Hippolyte Lafontaine were the only episodes directed by French-speakers.

== Episodes ==
No.	Title	Directed by	Written by	Original release date
TBA	"Lord Elgin: Voice of the People"	Julian Biggs	Charles Cohen	1959
TBA	"Joseph Howe: The Tribune of Nova Scotia"	Julian Biggs	Joseph Schull	1961
TBA	"William Lyon Mackenzie: A Friend to His Country"	Julian Biggs	Joseph Schull	1961
TBA	"Louis-Joseph Papineau: The Demi-God"	Louis-Georges Carrier	Guy Dufresne	1961
TBA	"Lord Durham"	John Howe	Charles E. Israel	1961
TBA	"Robert Baldwin: A Matter of Principle"	John Howe	Charles Cohen	1961
TBA	"Charles Tupper: The Big Man"	Morten Parker	Joseph Schull	1961
TBA	"John A. Macdonald: The Impossible Idea"	Gordon Burwash	George Salverson	1961
TBA	"Louis-Hippolyte Lafontaine"	Pierre Patry	Lise Lavallée; Pierre Patry	1962
TBA	"George-Étienne Cartier: The Lion of Québec"	John Howe	Charles Cohen	1962
TBA	"Alexander Galt: The Stubborn Idealist"	Julian Biggs	Charles E. Israel	1962
TBA	"David Thompson: The Great Mapmaker"	Bernard Devlin	Charles Cohen	1964
TBA	"Alexander Mackenzie: The Lord of the North"	David Bairstow	David Bairstow	1964
TBA	"Selkirk of Red River"	Richard Gilbert	TBD	1964
TBA	"John Cabot: A Man of the Renaissance"	Morten Parker	Morten Parker	1964
TBA	"Samuel de Champlain (Québec 1603)"	Denys Arcand	TBD	1964
TBA	"The Last Voyage of Henry Hudson"	Richard Gilbert	Charles Cohen	1964

== Works cited ==
- Evans, Gary (1991). In the National Interest: A Chronicle of the National Film Board of Canada from 1949 to 1989. University of Toronto Press. ISBN 0802027849.
