= Pilar Cabot =

Spanish author of poetry, children's and adult's books

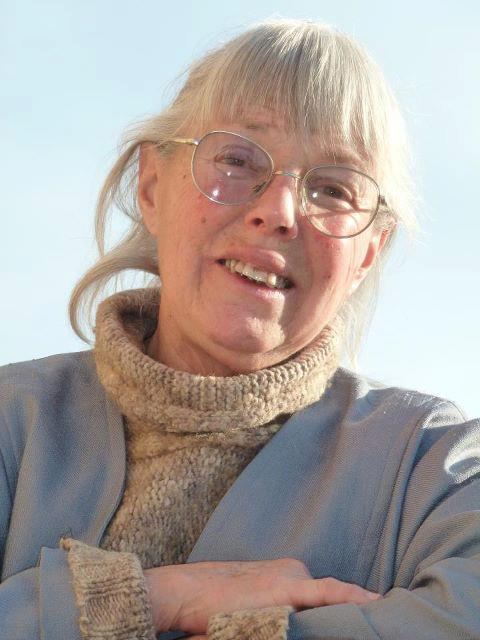
- Born: Pilar Cabot i Vila; 27 September 1940; Vic, Osona, Catalonia, Spain
- Died: 19 May 2017 (aged 76); Tavèrnoles, Catalonia, Spain
- Occupation: Writer
- Years active: 1965–2014
- Spouse: Armand Quintana

Pilar Cabot i Vila (27 September 1940 – 19 May 2017) was a Catalan writer of poetry, children's and adult's books, short stories and prose. She operated her own bookstore CLAM selling Catalan literature in her hometown of Vic from 1965 to 1985. Cabot authored approximately twenty works of poetry and she was actively involved as an honorary member of the Catalan Language Writers Association. She won awards for her works and established the Tertúlies amb poetes event happeneing every second Saturday of each month during an afternoon in 1997.

== Biography ==
On 27 September 1940, Cabot was born in Vic, Osona. She lived in a cultural climate from an early age and was particularly affectionate for music and theatre fostered by her grandfather, the amateur actor and playwright Josep Subirana i Serra. Cabot accompanied her grandfather to rehearsals at theatres and to discussions with fellow artists. She liked to play a game writing scripts on paper dolls and earned her first literary prize at age 11. She studied philosophy and letters and music. In 1965, Cabot opened the bookstore CLAM in Vic, which was wholly dedicated to Catalan books and records in Osona and Vic in the period of Francoist Spain and the Spanish transition to democracy. She kept the store open until 1985. During this time period, Cabot's bookstore was frequented by socialites emphasised books that were banned by censors.

She won the 1983 Osonenca Prize, the 1984 Musa de la Cova del Drac de Barcelona, and the 1987 Festivities Pompeu Fabra de Cantonigròs of Poetry. Cabot authored approximately twenty works of poetry. In 1987, she wrote the poetry collection Avui estimo Baudelaire and the non-fiction prose book Color de vida : Pintora A. Montaner. Two years later, Cabot published Balcó de guaita and then won the Caterina Albert Prize in 1990. She authored Ombres de mots i de silencis in 1992 and followed this with the publication of En Pere de les excuses a year later. In 1996, she wrote La plácida mirada de Guerau, and Amb veu d'amic that same year. Cabot published Quan l'absència et visiti the following year, and Setge in 1998. She co-wrote A l'ombra del semàfor with Armand Quintana in 2001; then Els versos obstinats two years later; Àncores o ales? in 2004; El cançoner d'en Marcel in 2011; Marcel-Partitures in 2012 and El niu transparent in 2014.

Cabot was actively involved with the Public Reading Commission of the Joan Triadú Library in Vic as a member from 1996, promoting and organising activities past the library. She established the free-admitting Tertúlies amb poetes occurring every second Saturday of each month during the afternoon in 1997. Cabot was an honorary member of the Catalan Language Writers Association. In 2014, she received recognition at the March of the Vigatans.

== Personal life ==
She was married to the cultural activist and writer Armand Quintana. On the evening of 19 May 2017, Cabot died in Tavèrnoles. She was given a funeral service three days later.

== Legacy ==
Roser Iborra described Cabot as "a vital woman, full of tireless energy and generosity. A woman who, in the midst of the Franco regime, built a bookshop-refuge in the heart of Vic, full of Catalan books, which was then an unthinkable audacity, with forbidden books hidden where no one would look for them, that is: among others, visible, on the shelves."
