= Lac Cabot, Mauricie =

Lake in Quebec, Canada

Lac Cabot
- Location within Quebec Location within Canada
- Location: La Tuque, Mauricie
- Coordinates: 47°41′06″N 73°33′50″W
- Type: Lake
- Basin countries: Canada
- Surface elevation: 454 m (1,490 ft)

The Lac Cabot is a freshwater lake located in La Tuque, Mauricie, Quebec, Canada. It is situated near Lac Dale and Lac Eagle, at an average elevation of 454 meters above the sea level.
