= Bingham v. Cabot =

Bingham v. Cabot may refer to the following Supreme Court of the United States cases:

- Bingham v. Cabot (1795), 3 U.S. 19
- Bingham v. Cabot (1798), 3 U.S. 382 holding that in diversity suits in federal courts, a party must allege appropriate citizenship and not simply residence, otherwise it may be stricken from the docket
