= CANTAT-2 =

Canadian transatlantic telephone cable

CANTAT-2 was the second Canadian transatlantic telephone cable, in operation from 1974 to 1992. It could carry 1,840 simultaneous telephone calls between Beaver Harbour, Nova Scotia and England. The parties involved were Canadian Overseas Telecommunication Corporation (now Teleglobe) and the British General Post Office. The cable was rerouted to Sable Island and renamed SITIFOG 2000 for a period, and was eventually decommissioned.

The work on the U.K. end of the cable involved an accident in which Pisces III, engaged in repeater burial of the newly laid cable on the shelf off Ireland, sank. The submersible sank in 1,575 ft (480.1 m) of water and was recovered with the crew safe after 76 hours.
