= Cabot 36 =

Canadian classic sailing yacht

The Cabot 36 sailboat is a Canadian classic sailing yacht that was built in the 1970s in Sydney, Nova Scotia from plans and drawings by the famous design team of Ted Brewer and Bob Walstrom. Only 49 Cabots were produced by Cabotcraft Industries, which folded in the late ‘70s when orders and government funding diminished and the market for sailing vessels hit a slump in both Canada and the U.S.

== Cabotcraft Industries ==
Cabotcraft Industries (CCI) was the result of a financial partnership between the Cape Breton Development Corporation (Devco), and two Toronto entrepreneurs and boaters, Fred Karp, V.P. at Speedy Muffler, and advertising executive, Jerry Goodes. CCI began operations at Pt. Edward Industrial Park, Sydney, N.S. in late 1972 or early 1973, in World War I naval buildings that had been converted by the Coast Guard for bringing small craft out of the water.

In the early seventies, the mining industry in Cape Breton was on the wane. Devco's mission was to put unemployed miners back to work. Many of the men who went to work for Cabotcraft Industries were miners who learned a new trade in boat building. They might have thought they had not left the mines. Working at CCI was rugged: Coal dust was used for tire grip in the winter snow, resin dust glittered in the sunlight coming through worn windows, and the first crew often dressed inside for winter temperatures.

== Development ==
Jim Marsh, John Perring and Bob Wallstrom did the lofting from Wallstrom’s plans, and line drawings from Ted Brewer, who had begun in his designs to take a “bite” out of the aft section of the traditional full keel, giving greater steerage in reverse. Intended for cruising in comfort in North Atlantic conditions, the Cabot 36 included an ample galley and storage below, and her construction was rugged, with a core of Airex foam. Ted Brewer challenged invited visitors to take a swing with an axe at a piece of the Airex foam. The Cabot was not a racing vessel, but it pleased buyers looking for safety, steady tracking, and comfort below.

Getting the first boat to show in 1974 was a scramble. The crew, traveling in a Winnebago, worked at every stop to build and finish the interior as the convoy headed to Annapolis, towing the Cabot behind an old ‘50s Mac Truck.

== Administrative changes ==
About 1975, after a dozen or so boats had been produced, Fred Karp and Jerry Goodes left, and Devco took the company over. John Perring replaced Jim Marsh at the helm for an interim period before Devco hired Roy Mac Keen, who had been working in their Tourism division, in part on Cruising Cape Breton, a successful navigational guide to the Bras d’Or Lakes. Mac Keen (as President) and Perring presided over the bulk of production to the company’s end in July 1978.

Economic conditions were bad for all boat builders in the late ‘70's. Competition was fierce and the energy crisis had begun to drive up the price for resins. CCI’s relative isolation from its main suppliers meant it always struggled to keep costs down. It was also not until sometime in 1975 that the facility had been improved enough to handle a line of ten boats under construction.

== Closing ==
In an attempt to diversify, the company had plans to do a 30-foot version of the boat, and molds had been done (and a few lay-ups) for the 41-foot Cape Islander fishing vessel. But these and other ventures into commercial applications of fiberglass could not save the company. Devco closed the operation in July 1978 after 49 boats, some as kits, had been completed.

The molds then languished for years in Nova Scotia fields, occasionally being visited by sailors who yearned to have their own Cabot 36. Rumors sometimes spread that a new company had been formed to bring her back, but nothing materialized.

Eventually, Brian Smyth, engineer and chief technical wizard with Yachtsmiths International, heard of their survival, but it wasn’t until 2002 that he fell in love with a Cabot 36, moored next to him in the Bahamas. On his return home, he and a partner went in search of the molds and plans were laid for a new line of production.

Most of the original fleet remains in operation worldwide. Owners and former owners maintain contact through established networks. The vessel developed a reputation for durability, seaworthiness, and comfort during extended voyages.
