= CCGS Alfred Needler =

Canadian fishery science ship built in 1982

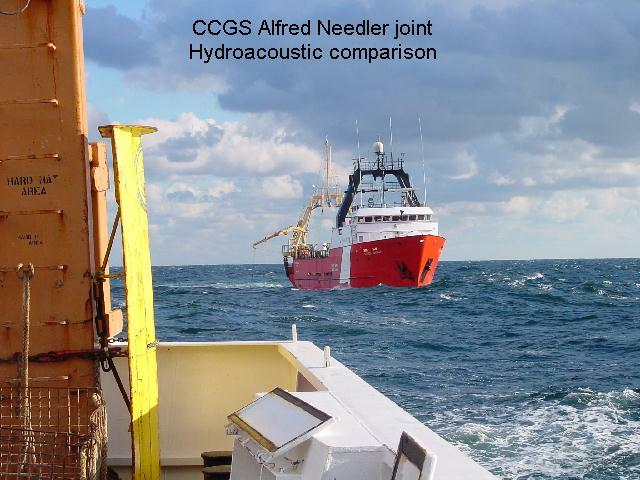
- CCGS Alfred Needler conducting fishery research off Canada's Atlantic coast

History

Canada
- Name: Alfred Needler
- Namesake: Alfred Needler
- Owner: Government of Canada
- Operator: Fisheries and Oceans Canada; Canadian Coast Guard
- Port of registry: Ottawa, Ontario
- Builder: Ferguson Industries Limited, Pictou
- Yard number: 211
- Launched: 19 December 1980
- Commissioned: August 1982
- Decommissioned: 9 February 2023
- Home port: CCG Base Dartmouth (Maritime Region)
- Identification: CG2683; IMO number: 7907104; MMSI number: 316001017
- Status: Decommissioned

General characteristics
- Type: Fisheries research vessel
- Tonnage: 958.9 GT; 225 NT
- Length: 50.3 m (165 ft 0 in)
- Beam: 11 m (36 ft 1 in)
- Draught: 4.9 m (16 ft 1 in)
- Installed power: 1,600 kW (2,200 bhp)
- Propulsion: 1 × Caterpillar 3606 6-cylinder diesel engine
- Speed: 14 knots (26 km/h; 16 mph)
- Range: 3,000 nmi (5,600 km; 3,500 mi) at 12 knots (22 km/h; 14 mph)
- Endurance: 30 days
- Complement: 21

CCGS Alfred Needler (Note: CCGS stands for Canadian Coast Guard Ship) was a offshore fishery science vessel formerly operated by the Canadian Coast Guard. The vessel entered service in 1982 with the Department of Fisheries and Oceans, stationed at the Bedford Institute of Oceanography in Dartmouth, Nova Scotia. In 1995, in order to reduce the number of ships and combine tasks, the Fisheries and Oceans fleet and the Canadian Coast Guard fleets were merged under the Canadian Coast Guard. The ship was decommissioned from Canadian Coast Guard service in 2023.

== Design and description ==
Alfred Needler is a stern commercial trawler design that is 50.3 m (165 ft 0 in) long overall with a beam of 11 m (36 ft 1 in) and a draught of 4.9 m (16 ft 1 in). The ship is similar in design to Wilfred Templeman, but with different machinery, power and speed. The ship has a 958.9 gross tonnage (GT) and a 225 net tonnage (NT). The research vessel is powered by one Caterpillar 3606 six-cylinder geared diesel engine driving one controllable pitch propeller creating 1,600 kilowatts (2,200 bhp). The vessel is also equipped with one Caterpillar 3306 emergency generator. This gives the vessel a maximum speed of 16 knots (30 km/h; 18 mph). Alfred Needler carries 209.50 m^{3} (46,080 imp gal) of diesel fuel, has a range of 3,000 nautical miles (5,600 km; 3,500 mi) at 12 knots (22 km/h; 14 mph) and can stay at sea for up to 30 days. The vessel has a complement of 21 composed of 7 officers and 14 crew and has 3 additional berths.

== Service history ==
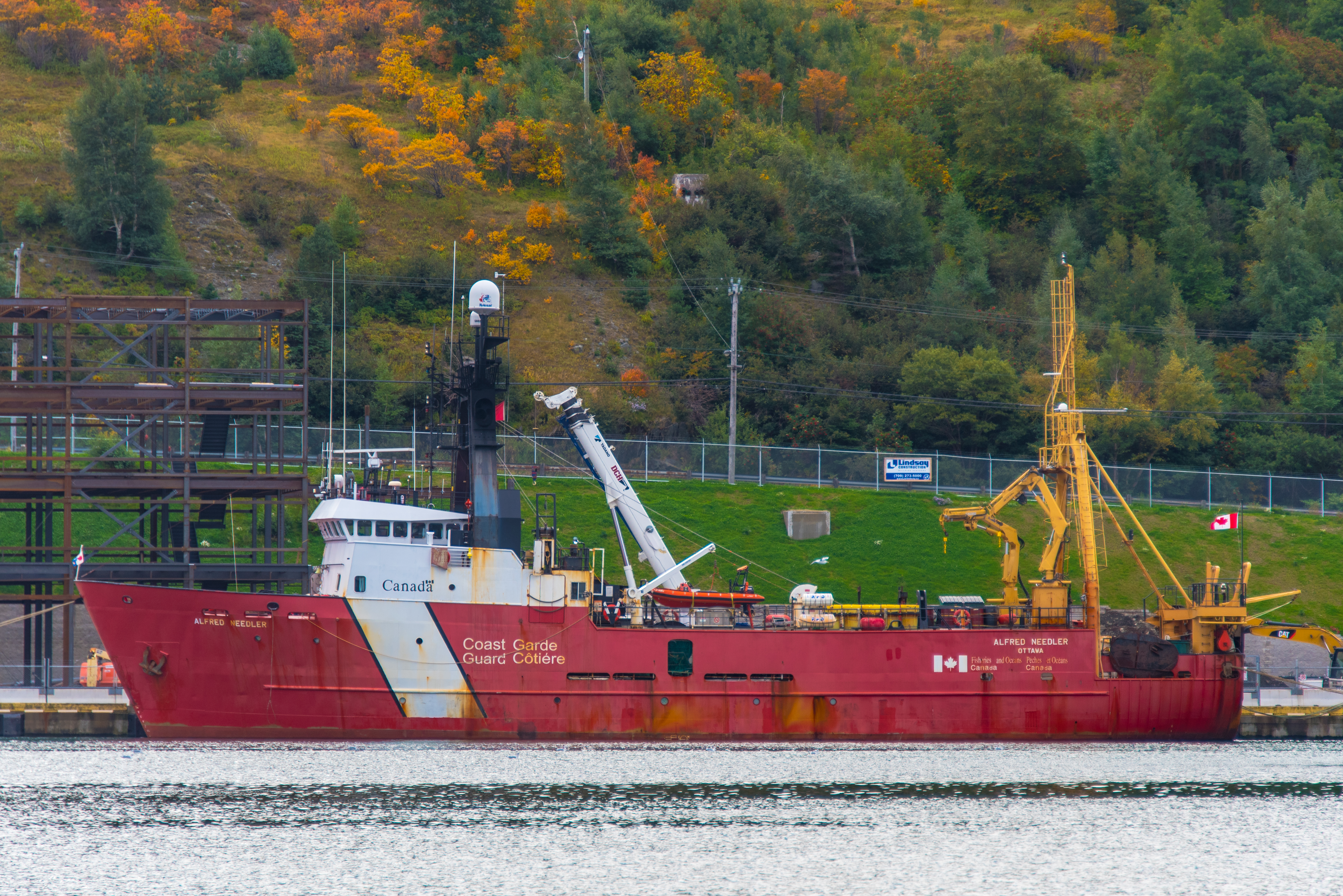
CCGS Alfred Needler, in St. John's Harbour, Newfoundland, Canada

The research vessel was constructed for the Department of Fisheries and Oceans in 1982 by Ferguson Industries Limited at their yard in Pictou, Nova Scotia with the yard number 211. The ship entered service in August 1982. She was named after Canadian fisheries marine biologist Alfred Needler, a former Deputy Minister of Fisheries and Oceans who developed a method of accurate fish counts from small surveys.

In 1995, in an effort to combine tasks, administration and making savings in both ships and funds, the Fisheries and Oceans and Canadian Coast Guard fleets were merged under the command of the Canadian Coast Guard. Alfred Needler was given the new prefix CCGS as a result. The ship was based at Dartmouth, Nova Scotia although she is often alongside at the Bedford Institute of Oceanography. She was one of several fishery research vessels operated by the Government of Canada to monitor migratory fish stocks in the North Atlantic. Alfred Needler was used by Canada and the Northwest Atlantic Fisheries Organization (NAFO) to conduct fisheries surveys; as such, she retains the configuration of a commercial trawler, although her fish holds are converted to laboratory space. The samples collected are used to study the population and health of various species of ocean life.

Alfred Needler experienced an engine room fire on 30 August 2003. There were no casualties although the ship sustained $1.3 million in damage. The cause of the fire was an oil leak in an incorrectly repaired turbocharger. In September 2009, the Department of Fisheries and Oceans announced invitations for contracts to replace several of the Coast Guard's research vessels, including Alfred Needler.

In July 2016, Alfred Needler discovered the wreck of a ship while trawling the waters off Nova Scotia. The vessel had been conducting an annual survey of the Georges Bank for the Department of Fisheries and Oceans. Alfred Needler began a $558,000 refit at St. John's Dockyard in St. John's, Newfoundland and Labrador in January 2018. The refit was scheduled to be completed in six weeks on 14 February, but additional steel work pushed the completion date to 1 April. CCGS Teleost was scheduled to replace Alfred Needler on the Department of Fisheries and Oceans' fisheries survey off the coast of southern Nova Scotia in late March. During the annual summer fisheries survey on the Scotian Shelf in 2018, she had several mission critical equipment failures, forcing the cancellation of the survey. This marked the first time in 48 years that the survey was not completed. Teleost was used to complete an abbreviated version of the survey. After suffering a number of significant mechanical and structural failures the ship was decommissioned in February 2023.
