= CCGS Teleost =

Canadian research ship built in 1988

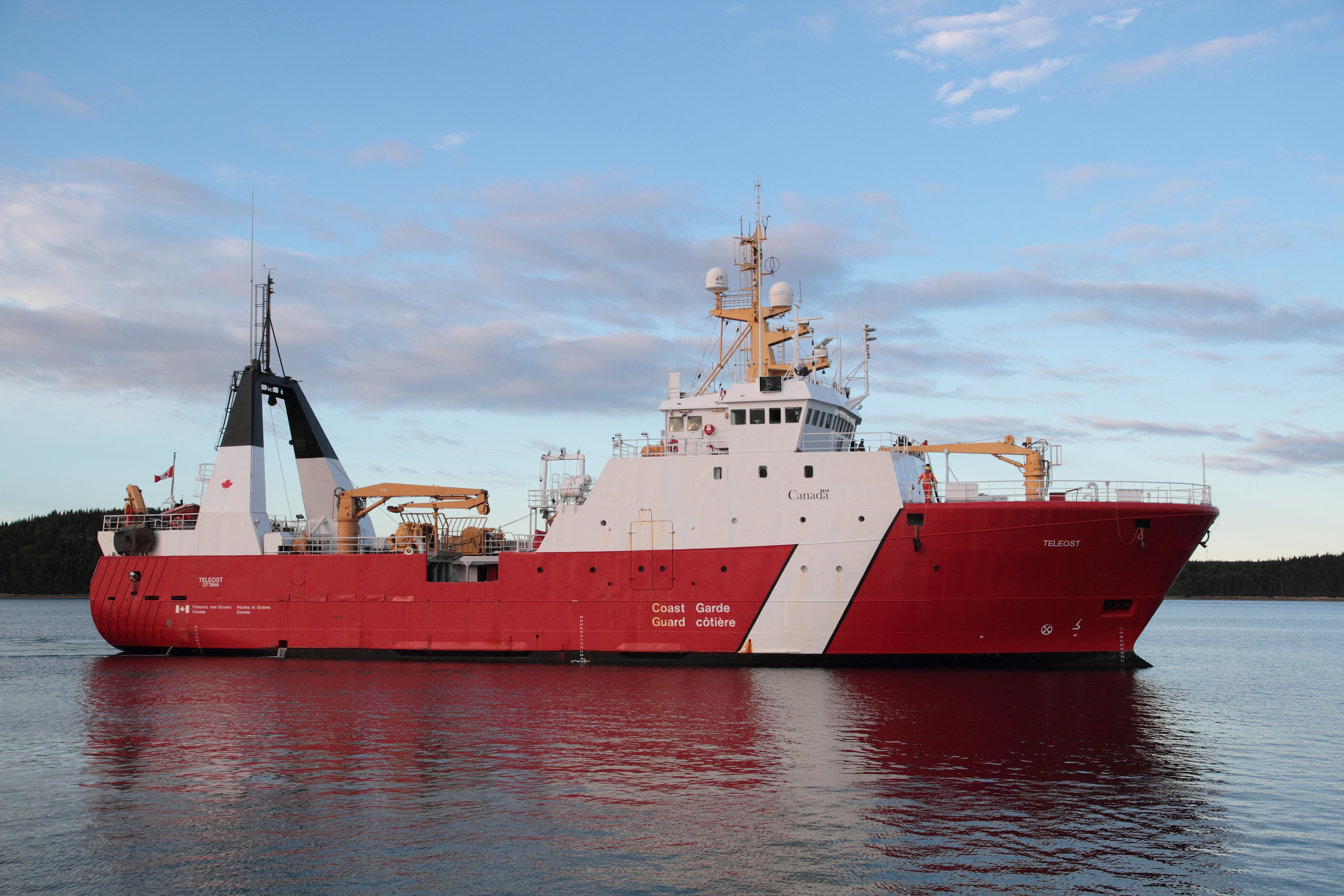
- CCGS Teleost at Havre-Saint-Pierre, Quebec, Canada

History
- Name: Atlantic Champion
- Builder: Langsten Slip-Batbyggeri AS Tomrefjord, Norway
- Yard number: 93
- Launched: 12 March 1988
- In service: 14 July 1988
- Out of service: 1993
- Identification: IMO number: 8714346
- Status: Purchased by Canada 1993

Canada
- Name: Teleost
- Namesake: Teleost, infraclass of Actinopterygii class of rayfin fish
- Operator: Canadian Coast Guard
- Port of registry: Ottawa, Ontario
- Acquired: 1993
- In service: 1996–present
- Home port: CCG Base, St. John's (Newfoundland and Labrador Region)
- Identification: CGCB
- Status: in active service

General characteristics
- Type: Fisheries research vessel
- Tonnage: 2,405 GT; 1,216 NT
- Length: 63 m (206 ft 8 in)
- Beam: 14.2 m (46 ft 7 in)
- Draught: 7.2 m (23 ft 7 in)
- Propulsion: Diesel Caterpillar 3606TA
- Speed: 13.5 knots (25.0 km/h)
- Range: 12,000 nmi (22,000 km) at 12 knots (22 km/h)
- Endurance: 42 days
- Complement: 20

CCGS Teleost (Note: CCGS stands for Canadian Coast Guard Ship. The French Canadian equivalent is NGCC - navire de la Garde côtière canadienne.) is a Canadian Coast Guard fisheries research vessel. The ship was originally constructed in Norway in 1988 as a commercial fishing trawler named Atlantic Champion. In 1993, the Canadian government purchased the vessel and after a competition among schoolchildren, the vessel was named Teleost by the winner. The vessel was converted to an offshore fisheries research vessel in 1994–1995 and entered service in 1996 with the Canadian Coast Guard. The ship is currently in active service.

== Design and description ==
Teleost is of a large commercial stern fishing trawler design. The vessel is 63 m (206 ft 8 in) long overall with a beam of 14.2 m (46 ft 7 in) and a draught of 7.2 m (23 ft 7 in). The vessel is powered by one Caterpillar 3612 geared diesel engine driving one controllable-pitch propeller, creating 4,000 brake horsepower (3,000 kW). The ship is also equipped with two emergency generators; one Caterpillar 3303 and one Caterpillar 3512. This gives the vessel a maximum speed of 13.5 knots (25.0 km/h). Teleost carries 400.00 m^{3} (87,990 imp gal) of diesel fuel, with a range of 12,000 nautical miles (22,000 km) at 12 knots (22 km/h) and can stay at sea for up to 42 days. The vessel has a complement of 22 with 9 officers and 13 crew and has 15 spare berths.

== Service history ==
The fishing vessel was initially constructed by Tangen Verft at Kragerø, Norway with the yard number 93. The ship was launched on 12 March 1988 as Atlantic Champion. The vessel's construction was taken over by Langsten Slip-Batbyggeri AS at their yard in Tomrefjord, Norway and Atlantic Champion was completed on 14 July 1988. In 1993, the ship was purchased by Canada for use as a fisheries research vessel. The ship underwent conversion to a fisheries research vessel in 1994. The new name of the ship was chosen in a contest by schoolchildren. The winning selection was the teleost, a type of bony fish. Teleost entered service with the Canadian Coast Guard in 1996. is registered in Ottawa, Ontario, but homeported at St. John's, Newfoundland and Labrador.

The vessel carries out surveys of the Newfoundland and Labrador region. Teleost is equipped with several types of laboratories. The vessel can also perform search and rescue duties. In September 2009 the Department of Fisheries and Oceans announced invitations for contracts to replace several of the Coast Guard's research vessels, including Teleost. Teleost underwent a $1.6 million refit at St. John's Dockyard in St. John's. The refit was extended past its deadline to 30 March 2018 after additional steel work was required on the ship. Teleost was scheduled to replace CCGS Alfred Needler on the Department of Fisheries and Oceans's fisheries survey on the Georges Bank since the latter was also undergoing a refit, but due to the refit's extension, became unavailable.
