= Tata Communications Canada =

International telecommunications carrier

- Formerly: Teleglobe Canada Inc.
- Type: Subsidiary
- Industry: Telecommunication
- Founded: 1950; 76 years ago
- Parent: Tata Communications

Tata Communications (Canada) ULC is an international telco carrier. The company is a subsidiary of Tata Communications, part of India's Tata Group and based in Montreal, Quebec. Part of their recent work has involved the updating of the CANTAT transatlantic cable system that connects the United Kingdom and Newfoundland under the Atlantic Ocean. The latest version of CANTAT, CANTAT-3, had a capacity of 5 Gbit/s in each direction across the Atlantic.

== History ==
The company was, in 1950, a Canadian federal Crown corporation called Canadian Overseas Telecommunications Corporation (COTC). In 1975 the COTC was renamed Teleglobe Canada. After the 1984 election, Prime Minister Brian Mulroney began the process of privatizing Crown corporations and Teleglobe Canada was one of the target assets.

It was finally sold to a small telecommunications equipment maker Memotec Data Incorporated of Montreal in 1987 and Teleglobe Canada became a unit of its new owners. In 1992, Memotec changed its own name to Teleglobe Canada Incorporated.

In 2000 Teleglobe Inc. was acquired by Bell Canada Enterprises, or BCE, which had already owned 23%. In 2002, BCE terminated its relationship with Teleglobe. BCE is now defending several litigations arising out of its abandonment of the Teleglobe business.

It was then sold to two American buyers, New York City based Cerberus Capital LLP and Philadelphia based Ten-X Capital Partners LLC. Renamed again, it became Teleglobe International Holdings Limited with incorporation in Bermuda and its corporate office in Virginia.

In 2005, it was bought by the Indian industrial giant Tata Group.

During its life as a Crown corporation and as part of Memotec Data, Teleglobe still maintained operations in Canada. Earth stations were located across Canada:

- Toronto, Ontario – Eglinton Avenue and Pharmacy Avenue (site owned by Bell); Milner Avenue and Morningside Avenue
- Weir, Quebec
- Montreal, Quebec
- Corner Brook, Newfoundland and Labrador
- Port Alberni, British Columbia

Head office was in Montreal and last located at Techno Park. Tata Communications Canada's head office is located at 1555 Rue Carrie-Derick in Montreal.

After the American buyout, the head office was in Reston, Virginia.

In February 2006, the company was renamed to Teleglobe, a VSNL International Company, a unit of VSNL International, then an Indian PSU.

Having lost the monopoly as a long-distance carrier in 1997, Teleglobe is a diversified international telecommunications services with focus in voice, data and IP, and mobile signaling services.

In February 2008, Tata Communications announced that VSNL, VSNL International, Teleglobe, Tata Indicom Enterprise Business Unit and Cipris have been integrated under Tata Communications brand name.

== Locations ==
Tata Canadian locations are:

- 1959 Upper Water Street (Purdy's Wharf Tower 1), Halifax, Nova Scotia - offices
- 1555 rue Carrie Derick, Montreal - head office
- 825 Milner Avenue, Toronto (former earth station for VSNL and Teleglobe)

== See also ==
- Tata Communications
- Telesat Canada
- Bell Canada Enterprises
- Tata Group
