= CCGS John Cabot (2020) =

Canadian offshore fisheries research ship (2020)

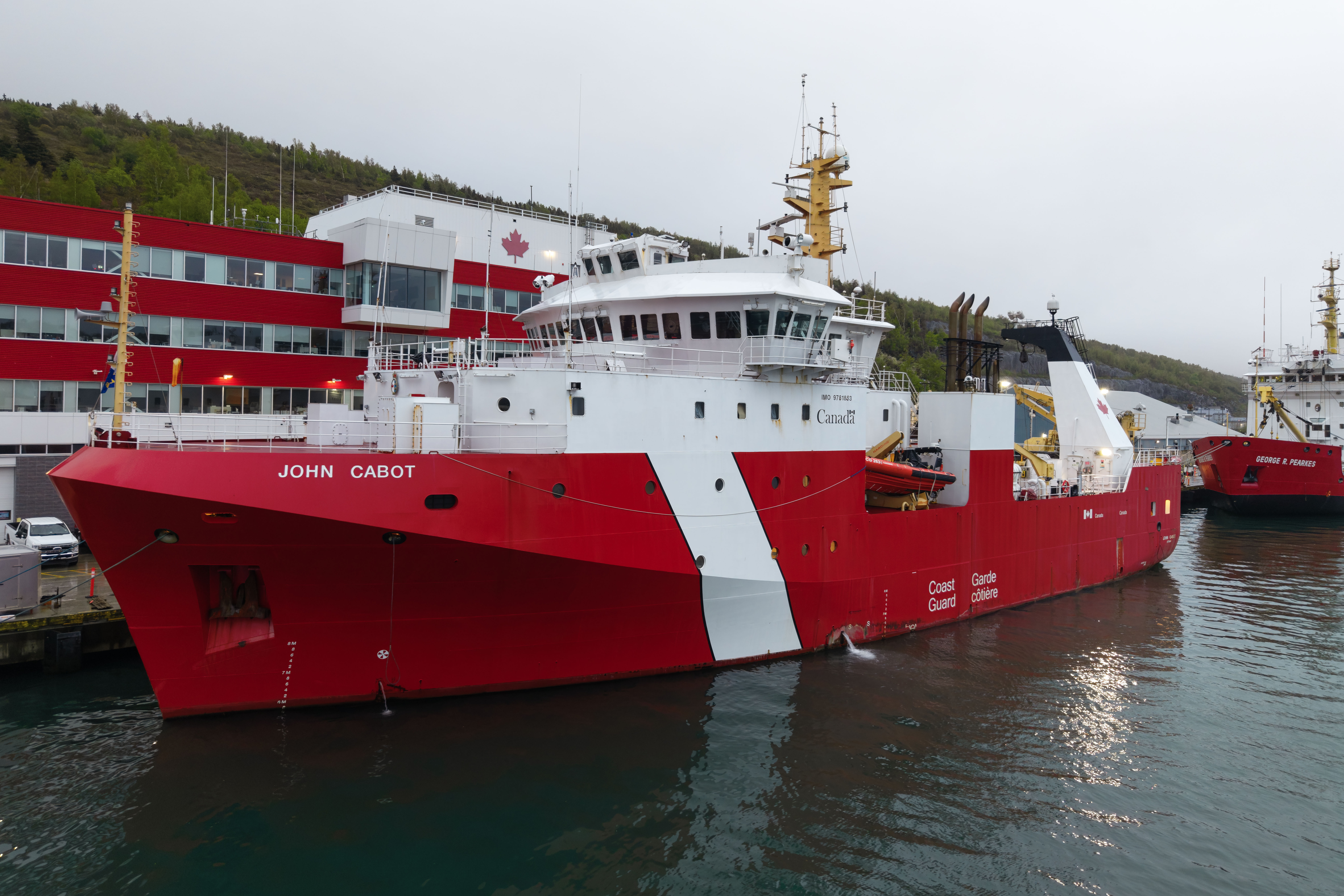
- John Cabot moored in St. John's, Newfoundland.

History

Canada
- Name: John Cabot
- Namesake: John Cabot
- Operator: Canadian Coast Guard
- Port of registry: Ottawa, Ontario
- Builder: Vancouver Shipyards, North Vancouver
- Launched: 3 July 2020
- In service: 2020–present
- Identification: CGDJ; IMO number: 9781853
- Status: in active service

General characteristics
- Tonnage: 2,672 GT; 892 NT
- Length: 63.4 m (208 ft 0 in)
- Beam: 16 m (52 ft 6 in)
- Draught: 6.2 m (20 ft 4 in)
- Ice class: Polar Class 7
- Propulsion: Diesel electric 3 × Caterpillar-3512 engine, 2,250 kW (3,020 hp)
- Speed: 8 knots (15 km/h; 9.2 mph) (cruise); 12.5 knots (23.2 km/h; 14.4 mph) (maximum)
- Range: 6,400 nmi (11,900 km; 7,400 mi)
- Endurance: 31 days
- Complement: 23

CCGS John Cabot is a Canadian Coast Guard offshore fisheries research ship. The vessel was constructed in 2020 by Vancouver Shipyards, operated by Seaspan Shipyards, in North Vancouver, British Columbia. It is named after John Cabot, an Italian explorer. John Cabot's home port is St. John's, Newfoundland and Labrador.

== History ==
In June 2023, John Cabot participated in the search for the OceanGate Titan submersible. It stayed on to support the recovery of the wreckage of the Titan submersible implosion.
