= Pisces-class deep submergence vehicle =

Three person research deep-submergence vehicles

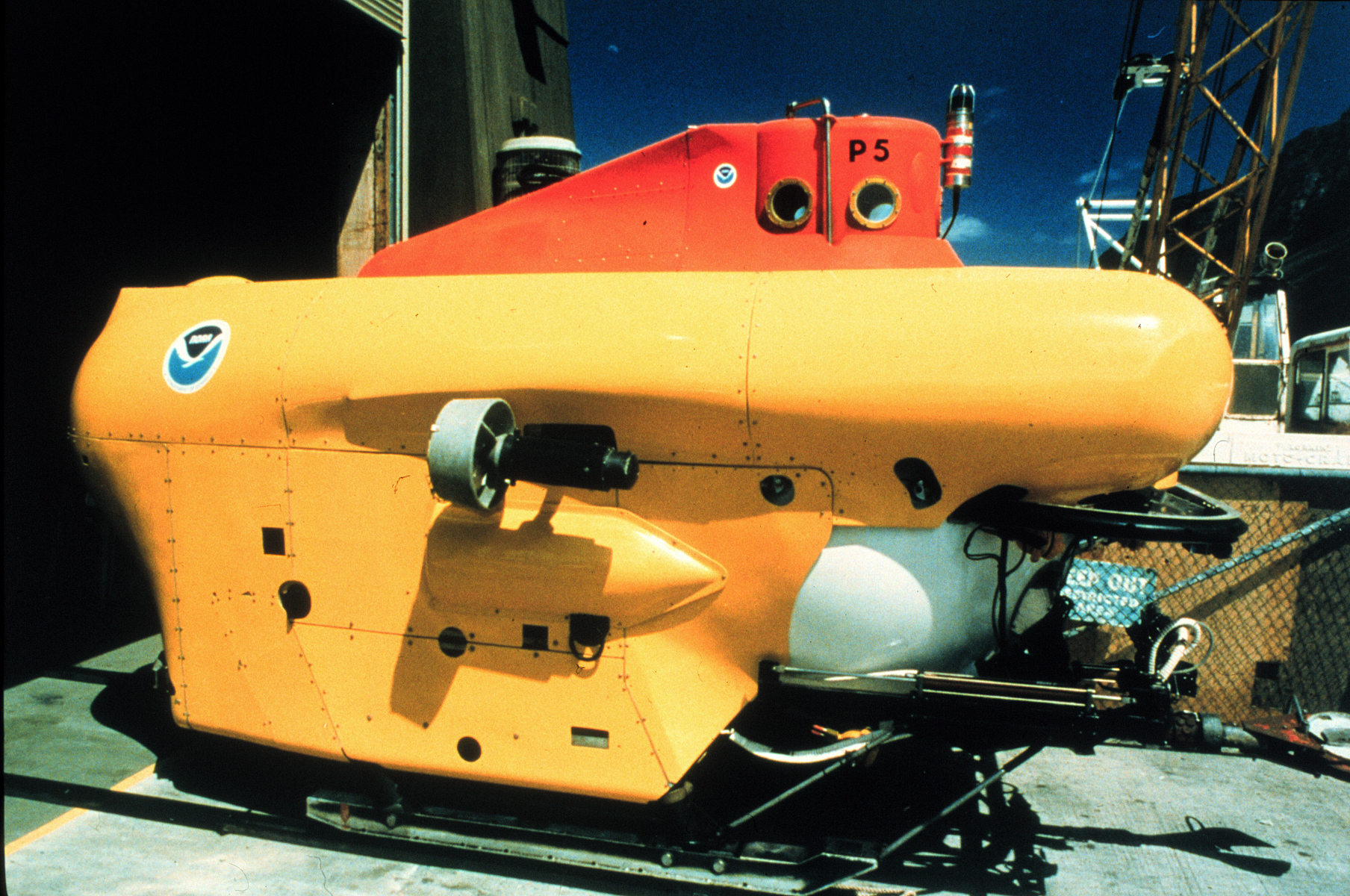
- Pisces V

History

United States
- Name: Pisces IV and Pisces V
- Owner: National Oceanic and Atmospheric Administration
- Operator: Hawaii Undersea Research Laboratory
- Builder: Hyco International Hydrodynamics, North Vancouver
- Completed: Early 1970s

General characteristics
- Displacement: 13,000kg
- Length: 6.10 m (20 ft 0 in)
- Beam: 3.20 m (10 ft 6 in)
- Height: 3.35 m (11 ft 0 in)
- Propulsion: 2 × side-mounted reversible thrusters tiltable through 90 degree, 2 × lead-acid battery systems: 120 V DC at 330 Ah capacity and 12–24 V DC at 220 Ah capacity
- Speed: 2.0 knots
- Range: 7–10 hours operational time
- Endurance: 140 hours life support for 3 people
- Test depth: 2,000 m (6,600 ft)
- Crew: 3 persons
- Sensors & processing systems: Tritech SeaKing digital high definition sonar, Laser scaling system, Falmouth Scientific Micro CTD, Simrad altimeter sonar, Seabird Electronics Seacat CTD (Conductivity, Temperature, Depth) seawater profiler, TrackLink 5000HA USBL submersible tracking system, Sonatech long baseline acoustic tracking system, externally-mounted thermistors-internal meters
- Notes: 600 lb payload. HYCO Hydrodynamics manipulator: Schilling Titan 7 degrees of freedom

Pisces-class submersibles are three-person research deep-submergence vehicles designed and built by Hyco International Hydrodynamics of North Vancouver in British Columbia with a maximum operating depth of 2,000 m (6,560 ft). The vehicles have multiple view ports and sample collecting, environmental sensing, and instrument placement capabilities. The pressure hull has a 7 ft (2.1 m) inside diameter and is made of HY-100 steel with three forward-looking acrylic windows, 6 in (15 cm) in diameter. Designed by Allan Trice, the Pisces series of submersibles were representative of crewed submersibles built in the late 1960s and were proven workhorses in offshore exploration and oceanographic research. Pisces II was the first production model of the design and was completed in 1968, with nine more Pisces submarines built before the manufacturer went out of business in the late 1970s.

== 1973 Pisces III rescue ==
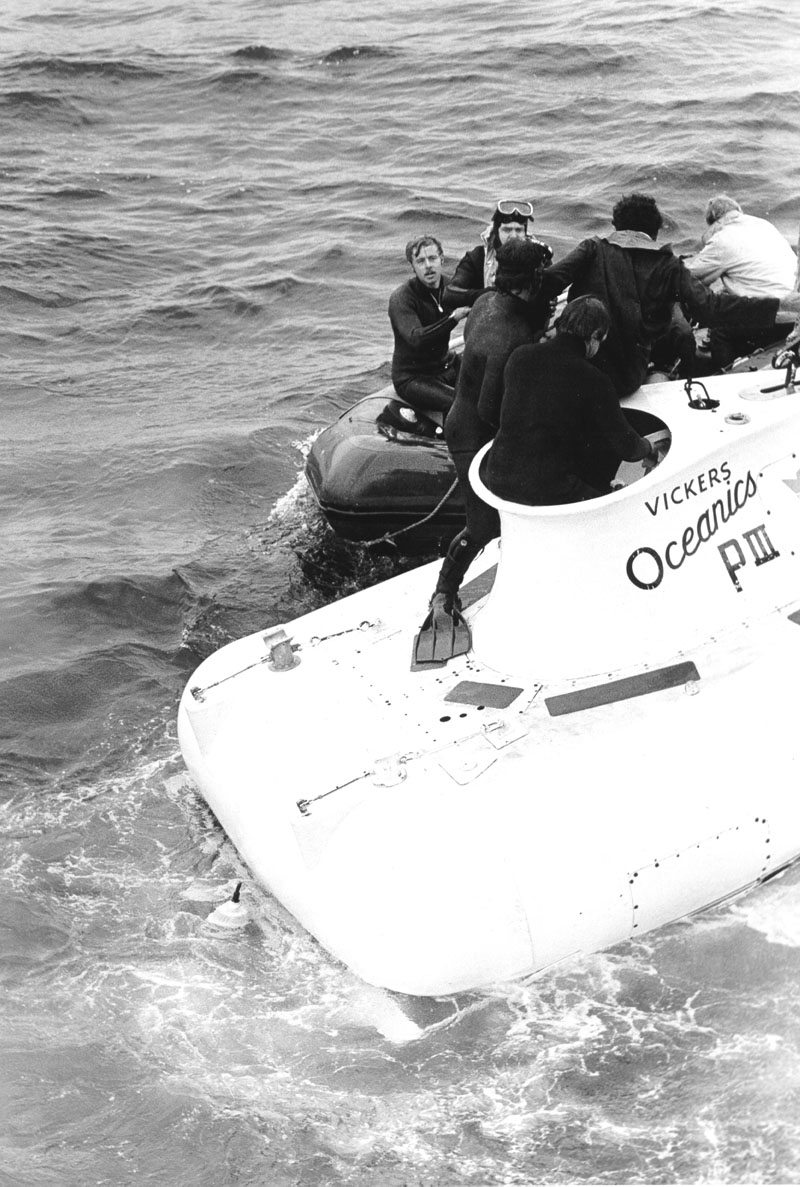
Divers assist pilots from Pisces III.

Pisces III was being used to bury cable and repeaters of the CANTAT-2 transatlantic telephone cable on the sea bottom off Ireland in 1973 when a buoyancy tank was inadvertently flooded. It sank to the bottom of the ocean with its two-man crew, Britons Roger Mallinson and Roger Chapman, stranded at a depth of 1,575 feet (480 m) and 72 hours of available life support, which they were able to extend to 76 hours by careful conservation. Initial rescue efforts by Pisces III sister submersibles were unsuccessful. Through an international effort of the United States, Canada, and Great Britain, the U.S. Navy Cable-controlled Undersea Recovery Vehicle (CURV-III) was deployed within 24 hours 6,000 miles from its home base. Deployment of CURV-III from CCGS John Cabot was hampered by heavy sea conditions. Rapid repairs were made when CURV-III's gyroscope failed and electronics shorted-out after sea water came aboard the Cabot. Assisted by the submersibles Pisces II and Pisces V, CURV-III was able to attach lines to the Pisces III hatch. The Cabot raised CURV-III at 60 to 100 feet (18 to 30 m) per minute until their lines entangled. The lines were cut, CURV-III was abandoned, and Pisces III was floated to 60 feet (18 m) where scuba divers were able to attach lines that were used to lift Pisces III the rest of the way to the surface. CURV-III had performed the deepest underwater rescue in history when Pisces III's two-man crew was rescued after 76 hours with just 12 minutes of air remaining.

== Pisces IV and V ==
Pisces IV and Pisces V are currently operated for research by the National Oceanic and Atmospheric Administration, based in Hawaii. Its mother ship, the R/V Kaʻimikai-o-Kanaloa, launches Pisces V and its sister vessel Pisces IV from an A-frame hoist on its aft deck.

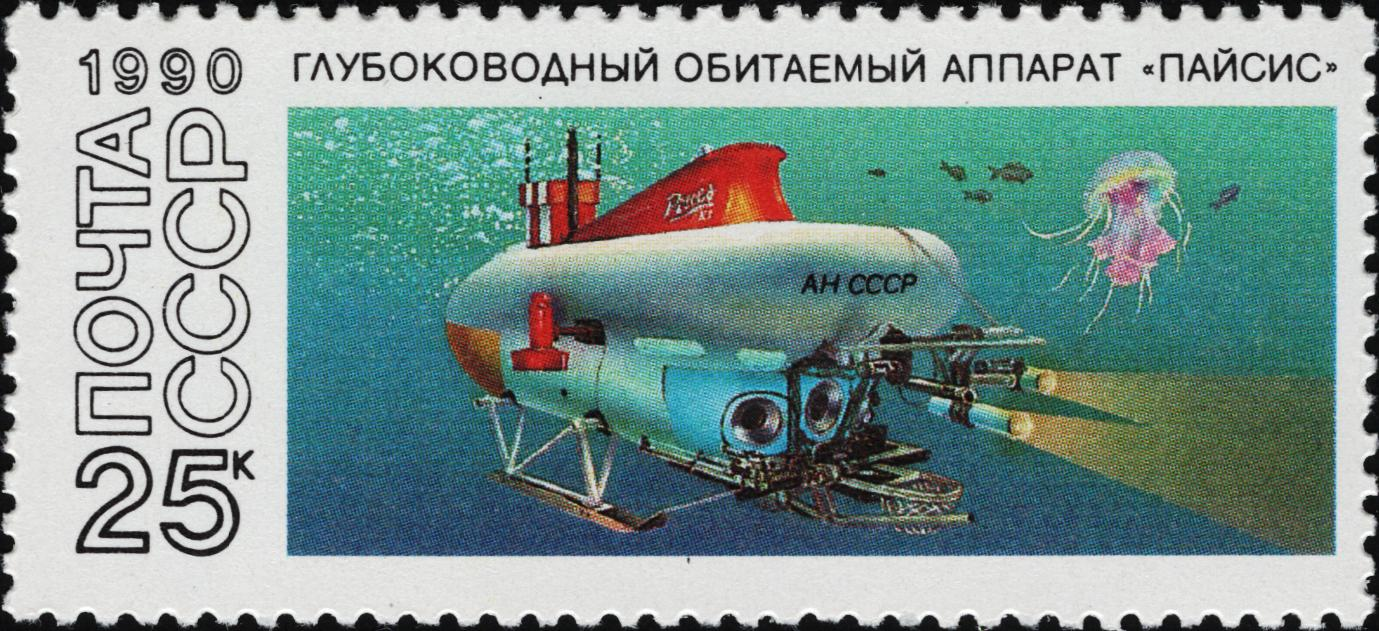

Pisces IV was built for the Soviet Union in 1971, but due to national security concerns from the United States that sensitive technology might be transferred to the Soviets, the Canadian government refused to issue the export permit and instead purchased it for its Department of Fisheries and Oceans. Both Pisces IV and V are currently operated by the Hawai'i Underwater Research Laboratory, part of the U.S. National Undersea Research Program. The second Pisces is kept on board in a ready state in case of an emergency.

== Pisces VI ==
Pisces VI was purchased out of storage from International Underwater Contractors in 2015. The vessel underwent a complete refit in Salina, Kansas, and Vancouver, Canada, and then was moved to Tenerife, Canary Islands, where it got certified and insured. It was re-engineered to provide a versatile deep water platform to meet the needs of the underwater research community. Currently, the submarine provides services to the scientific community around the world.

== Pisces VII and XI ==
Pisces VII and Pisces XI were built in 1975 and used by the Shirshov Institute of Oceanology of the Academy of Sciences of the Soviet Union for about ten years, until being replaced by the Mir submersibles. Akademik Kurchatov, Dmitri Mendeleev, and Akademik Mstislav Keldysh served as their support ships.

== Production ==
DSV	Completed	Depth (ft)	Crew
PISCES I	1965	1,200	2
PISCES II	1968	2,600	2/3
PISCES III	1969	3,600	2/3
PISCES IV	1971	6500	3
PISCES V	1973	6500	3
PISCES VI	1976	8300	3
Pisces VII	1976	6500	3
PISCES VIII	1976	3300	3
PISCES IX	Unbuilt	8300	3
PISCES X	1976	3300	3
PISCES XI	1976	6500	3

== Current status of vehicles ==
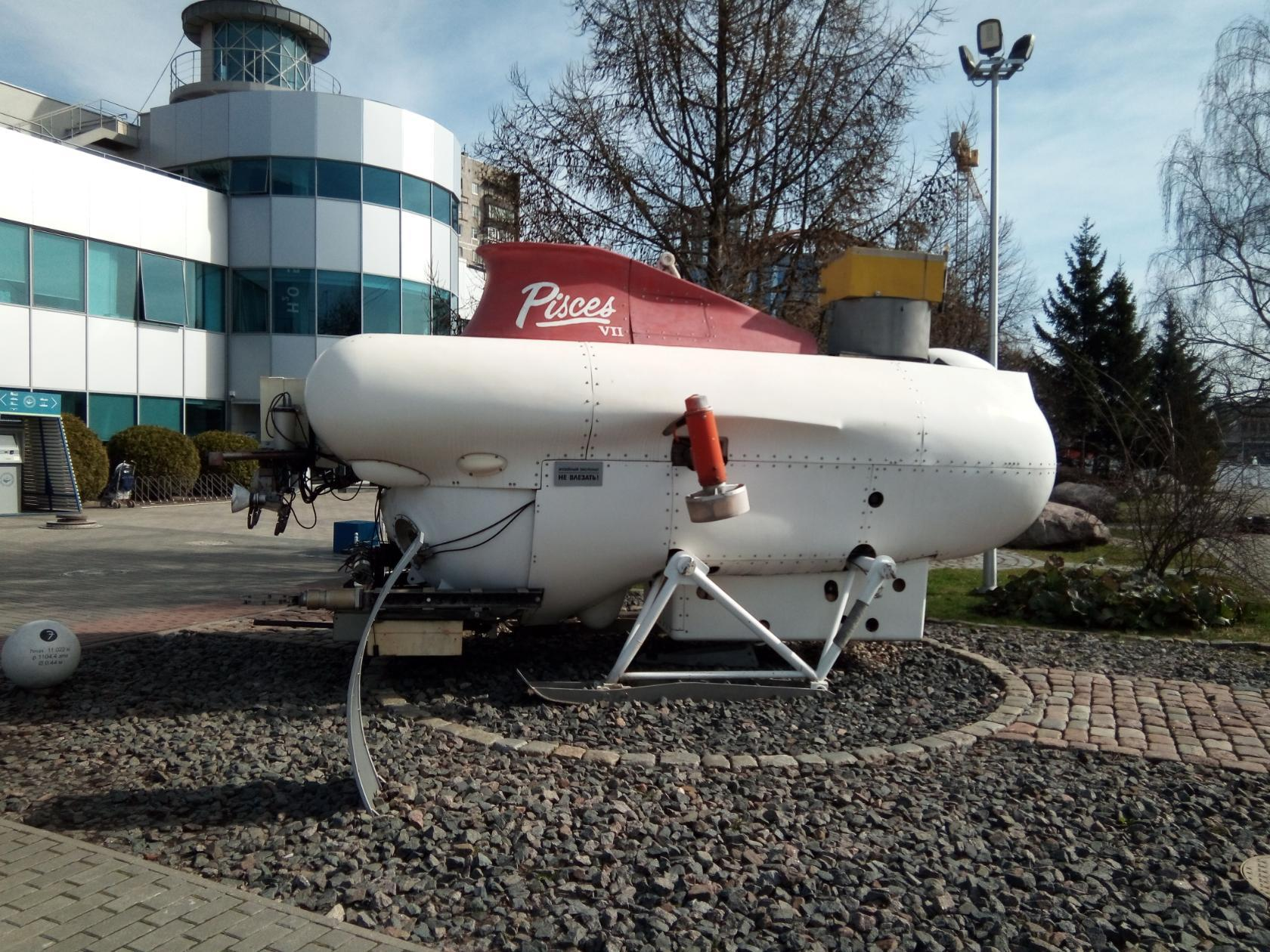
Pisces VII exhibited at the Museum of the World Ocean in Kaliningrad

- Pisces II is currently on display at Deep Marine, a maritime museum highlighting the deep-sea technology legacy of Hyco at Deep Marine, located at the old Versatile Pacific Shipyards site on the waterfront at Esplanade and Lonsdale, in North Vancouver, British Columbia, Canada.
- Pisces III is on display at Weymouth Sea Life Centre, Dorset, United Kingdom.
- Both Pisces IV and V have undergone recent upgrades and are operated by the Hawai'i Undersea Research Laboratory (HURL), NOAA's Undersea Research Center at the University of Hawaiʻi School of Ocean & Earth Science & Technology.
- Pisces VI underwent refit in Salina, Kansas, United States, and is now based in the Canary Islands.
- Of the two Russian-owned submersibles, Pisces VII and XI, VII is on display at the Museum of the World Ocean in Kaliningrad, next to the research vessel Vityaz. XI is on display at the Baikal Museum in Listvyanka.

== Sources ==
- Forman, Will (1999). The History of American Deep Submersible Operations, 1775–1995. Flagstaff, Arizona: Best Publishing Company. pp. 271–275. ISBN 978-0941332729.
- Busby, R. Frank (1976). Manned Submersibles. Office of the Oceanographer of the Navy [US Navy]. ASIN B0006CRZRI.
- Jensen, Vickie, ed. (2021). Deep, Dark & Dangerous: The Story of British Columbia's World-Class Undersea Technology Industry. Pender Harbour, British Columbia: Harbour Publishing. ISBN 978-1550179200.
- "Dog Taylor & selling to the Russians". deepdarkanddangerous.ca. 2021. Archived from the original on 2022-07-06.
