= List of domestic submarine communications cables =

This is a list of domestic submarine communications cables and does not include international cable systems. All the cable systems listed below have landing points within one country, and are currently (as of August 2007) in-service. Several older cables, although no longer used for telecommunications, are used for scientific purposes. Others are simply abandoned.

== A ==
- AFOS (Azores Fiber Optic System)
- Almeria-Melilla (Spain mainland interconnect to Melilla on the coast of Morocco)
- APOCS (Atlantic Provinces Optical Cable System)
- APOCS 1B (Atlantic Provinces Optical Cable System)
- APOCS 1C (Atlantic Provinces Optical Cable System)
- APOCS 2 (Atlantic Provinces Optical Cable System)
- AUFS-EAST (Alaska United Fiber Optic Cable System)
- AUFS-WEST (Alaska United Fiber Optic Cable System)

== B ==
- Bass Strait 1 (connects Australia mainland to Tasmania)
- Bass Strait 2 (connects Australia mainland to Tasmania)
- Beijing - Qingdao (Lingao) - (China)
- Brazil Domestic
- Bugio (Lisbon-Sesimbra interconnect)

== C ==
- CAM-RING (Lisbon - Madeira - Azores, Portugal)
- CANDALTA (Candeleria - Alta Vista, Spain)
- CANI (Chennai - Andaman and Nicobar Islands)
- CC3 (Continent - Corsica 3) (Marseille - Ajaccio, France)
- CC4 (Continent - Corsica 4) (Cannes - Ile Rousse, France)
- CC5 (Continent - Corsica 5) (La Seyne - Ajaccio, France)
- CEIBA-1 (Equatorial Guinea, connects Bata - Malabo)
- Columbia Domestic Festoon
- Como Lake Festoon (Italy)
- Cook Strait Fibre Optic Cable (connects North and South Islands of New Zealand)

== D ==
- DFON - (Domestic Fibre Optic Network) - Philippine Long Distance Telephone co. (Philippines)
- DDSCN - (Domestic Fibre Optic Network) - Dhiraagu Plc. (Maldives)

== F ==
- FiberWeb (Ocean Fiber) - connecting oil rigs off the coast of Louisiana

== G ==
- Germany Domestic
- Global West Network (California coastline from San Diego to San Francisco)
- GOPTIC (connects Sweden mainland with Gotland)
- Greece Domestic
- Guangdong-Hainan (China)
- Guangzhou-Haikou (China)
- Guangzhou-Shantou (China)
- Gulf of Mexico Festoon (Mexico)

== H ==
- Hong Kong Domestic
- HICS (Hawaii Inter-Island Cable System)
- HYERES Festoon 1 (Giens - Porquerolles) - France
- HYERES Festoon 2 (Porquerolles - Port Cros) - France
- HYERES Festoon 3 (Heliopolis - Port Cros) - France
- HYERES Festoon 4 (Heliopolis - Le Lavandou) - France

== I ==
- Iberian Festoon (Spain)
- IC-1 (Israeli Coasting 1) - (Israel)
- Indigo Central (Australia) - Perth to Sydney
- Italian Festoon
  - (Ancona - Trieste)
  - (Bari - Ancona)
  - (Catania - Locri)
  - (Catania - Bari)
  - (Cefalu - Palermo)
  - (Cetara - Vietri)
  - (Civitavecchia - Giglio)
  - (Civitavecchia - Pomezia)
  - (Elba - Piombino)
  - (Formia - Naples)
  - (Genoa - Pisa)
  - (Giglio - Maddalena)
  - (Grosseto - Citavecchia)
  - (Ischia - Procida)
  - (Lamezia - Messina 1)
  - (Lamezia - Messina 2)
  - (Locri - Catanzaro)
  - (Maddalena - Sassari)
  - (Maiori - Cetara)
  - (Massalubrense - Capri)
  - (Mazara - Pantelleria)
  - (Messina - Cefalu)
  - (Miliscola - Procida)
  - (Naples - Salerno)
  - (Palermo - Rome)
  - (Pisa - Grosseto)
  - (Pomezia - Formia)
  - (Positano - Praiano)
  - (Praiano - Vettica)
  - (Reggio Calabria - Catania)
  - (Reggio Calabria - Gazzi 1)
  - (Reggio Calabria - Gazzi 2)
  - (Reggio Calabria - Gazzi 3)
  - (Salerno - Scalea)
  - (Scalea - Lamezia)
  - (Venice - Ravenna)
  - (Vettica - Maiori)
  - GENSAR 2 - (Savona – Sassari)
  - JANNA - (Olbia - Civitavecchia)
  - JANNA 2 - (Cagliari - Mazara del Vallo)
  - ROMSAR - (Pomezia - Golfo Aranci)
  - ROMSAR 2 - (Rome - Sardinia)
  - SARGEN - (Golfo Aranci-Genoa)
  - SARSIC - (Golfo Aranci-Palermo)
  - SARSIC 2 - (Cagliari-Palermo)

== J ==
- Jakarta-Surabaya (SKKL-JS) (connects the two ends of the island)
- Japan Domestic
- JASUKA (Indonesia)
- JIH (Japan Information Highway)
- JRD-3 (Japan Reconfiguration and Digitization) - connects the Kanto Plain in southern Japan with Okinawa
- JAKA2LADEMA (Indonesia), connects Java, Kalimantan, Sulawesi, Bali, and Lombok islands.

== K ==
- Korea Domestic
- KSL (Korean Southern Loop) link between Osan US Airbase and Kunsan US Airbase
- KINYRAS (Cyprus)
- Kuantan-Kota Kinabalu (Malaysia) link between Peninsular Malaysia and the Northwest coast of Borneo

== L ==
- Lake Michigan Cable - connects Kewaunee, WI to Arcadia, MI (United States)
- Levin-Nelson (Cook Strait) Cable - connects North and South Islands of New Zealand
- LFON (Libyan Fibre Optic Network)

== M ==
- Malaysian Domestic Submarine Cable System-North Link
- Malaysian Domestic Submarine Cable System-South Link
- Malaysian Festoon
- Maldives Domestic
- Mallorca-Menorca (Balearic Islands)
- MTC (Guam—Rota, Marianas—Tinian, Marianas—Saipan, Marianas)
- MKCS (Mataram Kupang Cable System, Indonesia), connects major cities in Nusa Tenggara, islands spread to the east of Bali.

== N ==
- NDTN - (National Digital Transmission Network) - (Philippines)
- NEPTUNE (North-East Pacific Time-Series Undersea Networked Experiments) - off the coast of Canada
- Nigeria Domestic
- Norway Domestic
- Novorossiysk-Sochi (Russian Black Sea Interconnect)

== O ==
- OLERON (France mainland and Oleron Island connection)

== P ==
- Palau Inter-Island System
- Palapa Ring (Indonesia)
- Pangkalpinang-Pontianak (Indonesia)
- PENBAL-1 (Barcelona - Palma) - (Spain)
- PENBAL-3 (Cabrera de Mar - Molina) - (Spain)
- PENBAL-4 (Valencia - Ibiza) - (Spain)
- PENBAL-5 (Gava - Ses Covetes) - (Spain)
- PENCAN-5 (Spain) (connects mainland Spain to Gran Canaria and Tenerife)
- PICOT (New Caledonia archipelago)

== S ==
- San Andrés Island-Providencia Island (Colombia)
- Sesimbra-Lagos (Portuguese Interconnect)
- SMAP (Sydney - Melbourne - Adelaide - Perth) (Australia)
- Sochi-Poti (Russian Black Sea Interconnect)
- South Korea Domestic
- Sumatra-Java-Melaka (Indonesia)
- Svalbard Undersea Cable System - Mainland Norway to Svalbard Islands

== T ==
- Taean-Chingdao (South Korea)
- TEFKROS (Cyprus)
- Thailand Domestic
- TM-1 (Taiwan)
- TT-1 - connects Trinidad to Tobago
- TURMEOS-1 (Turkey Marmara Aegean Optic System) - connects Izmir to Istanbul

== U ==
UNSC-Unitel North Submarine Cable

== V ==
- Venezuela Domestic Festoon
  - (Cabimas - Maracaibo)
  - (Maracaibo - Punto Fijo)
  - (Punto Fijo - Coro)
  - (Coro - Chichiriviche)
  - (Chichiriviche - Puerto Cabello)
  - (Puerto Cabello - Camuri)
  - (Camuri - Higuerote)
  - (Higuerote - Puerto La Cruz)
  - (Puerto La Cruz - Cumana)
  - (Cumana - Porlamar)
  - (Porlamar - Carupano)

== W ==
- WCI CABLE (Alaska - Oregon)
- Wellington Harbour Link (Wellington, New Zealand)

== Z ==
- ZanLink - (Tanzania)
