= Oman Australia Cable =

Submarine communications cable

- Owners: SUBCO
- Key people: Bevan Slattery
- Operator: SUBCO
- Landing points Perth, Australia; Cocos (Keeling) Islands; Diego Garcia; Muscat, Oman
- Total length: 9,800 km
- Design capacity: 39 Tbit/s
- Currently lit capacity: 48 Tbit/s
- Date of first use: September 2022

The Oman Australia Cable (OAC) is a 9,800 km fibre-optic submarine communications cable that entered service in September 2022, linking Oman and Australia via the Cocos (Keeling) Islands. The cable consists of three fibre pairs and had an initial design capacity of 39 terabits per second.

OAC is owned and operated by SUBCO, with Omantel as the landing partner in Oman, and Equinix providing the landing stations in Perth and Muscat.

== History ==
The cable was announced by SUBCO in 2020, with a target completion date in 2021. Manufacturing of the cable was completed by SubCom in January 2021, with the SubCom cable ships CS Dependable and CS Reliance being used for the installation works. The cable made landfall in Perth on 22 July 2021, with landing station infrastructure in the Cocos (Keeling) Islands also being manufactured and installed during 2021. Final landing of the cable in Barka, Oman occurred on 28 April 2022.

The cable went live during September 2022, and was officially switched on by Anthony Albanese, the Prime Minister of Australia, during a ceremony in Perth on 24 October 2022.

In March 2023, SUBCO announced plans to extend the cable with the installation of a diverse 1,200 km spur that would land at Salalah, Oman, which is expected to be completed by the end of 2024.

In October 2023, the cable was upgraded by Ciena from its original design of 39 Tbit/s to 48 Tbit/s of lit capacity.

== Routes ==
The Oman Australia Cable has been interconnected with the Indigo Central and Indigo West optical fibre cables at the Australian landing site in Perth. SUBCO and Omantel are expected to extend the reach of the cable with connections from Muscat to London, Milan and Marseille. The cable also includes additional branching units for future spurs that may link to Salalah, Oman and Djibouti City, Djibouti.

The cable is notable for providing a diverse international route from Perth, and a lower-latency path between Australia and Europe, the Middle East and Africa. Competing cables such as the Australia Singapore Cable, Indigo West and SEA-ME-WE 3 all traverse a similar path via the Sunda Strait to Singapore, whereas OAC traverses the Indian Ocean to the south-western coast of Asia.

The cable route is also noted as being similar to another proposed cable known as Australia West Express, which was first announced in May 2015 but was unable to obtain the investment required for construction and was ultimately cancelled.

== Diego Garcia Spur ==
During the laying of the cable, Twitter users monitoring the progress of the installation using Automatic identification system-based tracking services observed the CS Dependable loitering in the waters surrounding Diego Garcia, indicating that an undisclosed branching unit and spur may have been installed to provide connectivity to the atoll.

On 6 July 2023, the existence of the Diego Garcia spur was publicly confirmed by the United States Pacific Fleet as part of a Reuters investigation into SubCom. The article went on to state that the cable was previously announced to sailors on Diego Garcia by Captain Richard Payne, the commander of Diego Garcia at the time, during a talkback radio show on 9 February 2022, and that The Pentagon had paid for "around a third of the entire cable on the condition that it include a splice connecting its commercial trunk to Diego Garcia".

== Landing points ==
1. Perth, Western Australia, Australia
2. Cocos (Keeling) Islands
3. Diego Garcia
4. Muscat, Oman
