= SMAP (submarine communications cable) =

SMAP (Sydney-Melbourne-Adelaide-Perth)
- Cable type: Fibre-optic
- Construction beginning: 2018
- Construction finished: 2019
- First traffic: August 2019
- Built by: Alcatel Submarine Networks
- Landing points: Sydney, Australia; Melbourne, Australia; Adelaide, Australia; Perth, Australia
- Owner(s): SUBCO

Sydney-Melbourne-Adelaide-Perth (SMAP) is a 5,000 km fibre-optic submarine communications cable that entered service in June 2026, linking Sydney, Melbourne, Adelaide and Perth. The cable consists of sixteen fibre pairs, is fully armoured, and had an initial design capacity of more than 400 terabits per second.

SMAP is owned and operated by SUBCO.

== History ==
SMAP originates from the concept of an earlier cable, APX-Central. First proposed in 2013 by SubPartners, a company founded by Bevan Slattery, as part of a broader cable system known as Asia-Pacific Express (APX), APX-Central was originally projected to connect Perth to Sydney, with branching units for future connections to Adelaide, Melbourne and Hobart.

SubPartners struggled to obtain funding for the project, and in April 2017, SubPartners was acquired by Superloop, an Australian fibre infrastructure company which had been founded by Slattery in 2014, for A$2.5 million. The project was renamed to Indigo and revised to include construction of the former APX-Central segment between Perth and Sydney through the Great Australian Bight. The Indigo Central cable entered services in August 2019.

In March 2019, Slattery founded SUBCO to build, own and operate subsea communications cables. In August 2023, SUBCO announced SMAP as a fully armoured, 12 pair cable system capable of over 300 Tbit/s per section, with manufacturing by Alcatel Submarine Networks to commence in Q1 2024 and a projected completion date of Q1 2026. A spur that would connect the cable to Hobart was initially considered, however this did not eventuate due to commercial reasons and was unable to proceed without government funding.

In March 2024, SUBCO announced that the cable had been upgraded to a 16 pair cable system. Documentation submitted by SUBCO to the Australian National Environmental Protection Agency also revealed the existence of a planned branch to Garden Island, which is the location of the Royal Australian Navy's largest fleet base, Fleet Base West, also called HMAS Stirling.

In February 2025, SUBCO announced the completion of cable manufacturing, and in March commenced work on construction of the landing station in Torquay, Victoria. Commencement of works on the landing station in Adelaide followed in May. In July, the cable ship CS Île d'Yeu landed the first segment of the cable in Perth. On 22 September, Equinix announced that it had been selected to host the cable landing stations for the Perth and Sydney segments, and point of presence locations in Adelaide and Melbourne. On 23 September, CS Île d'Yeu reached Adelaide, before continuing on to Melbourne where it arrived on the 22 November.

In January 2026, SUBCO announced that the Perth-Adelaide-Melbourne segment would achieve final splice in January, with the Melbourne-Sydney segment projected to achieve final splice in March, and the cable to be ready for service in May. On the 28 January, CS Île d'Yeu completed the final cable landing in Sydney. In March, it was reported that the cable segment between Melbourne and Sydney had been split, with the creation of an independent terrestrial path in addition to the subsea path. Final splicing activities were completed in April, and the cable went live on 25 June 2026.

During June 2026, SUBCO and Firmus Technologies announced an agreement to construct a spur cable from SMAP, to be known as Bernacchi-1, that would connect the cable system to Hobart with a projected ready for service date of Q2 2027.

== Landing points ==
1. City Beach, Perth, Western Australia, Australia
2. West Beach, Adelaide, South Australia, Australia
3. Torquay, Victoria, Australia
4. Maroubra Beach, Sydney, New South Wales, Australia
