= MS Lodbrog =

Cable-laying ship

History
- Name: Siegelberg (1983-85); Tuzla (1985-96); Bolero (1996-2000); Lodbrog (since 2000)
- Owner: Compania de Navigatie ROMLINE (1985-2000); Alcatel Submarine Networks Marine (since 2000)
- Operator: Compania de Navigatie ROMLINE (1985-96); Seatruck Ferries (1996-97); Argoman (1997); Norfolk Line (1997-2000); Alcatel Submarine Networks Marine (since 2000)
- Port of registry: (Romania) Constanţa (1985-93); (Cyprus) Limassol (1993-95); (Romania) Constanţa (1995-2000); (Denmark) København (since 2000)
- Route: Black Sea (1985-96); Heysham - Warrenpoint (1996-97); Harwich - Cuxhaven - Turku (1997); Stockholm - Tallinn (1997); Scheveningen - Felixtowe (1997-98)
- Builder: VEB Mathias Thesen Werft
- Yard number: 154
- Launched: 29 November 1983
- In service: 9 April 1985
- Identification: IMO number: 8306591; Call sign OZYK2 (Lodbrog)

General characteristics
- Tonnage: 10,243 GT (1983-2001); 9,983 GT (since 2001); 6,704 DWT (1983-2001); 2,995 NT (since 2001)
- Length: 140.33 m (460 ft 5 in)
- Beam: 21.01 m (68 ft 11 in)
- Depth: 6.45 m (21 ft 2 in)
- Installed power: 2 diesel engines
- Speed: 14.5 knots (26.9 km/h; 16.7 mph)
- Capacity: 1,089 m (1,191 yd) lane capacity; 12 passengers (1983-2001)

Lodbrog is a 10,243 GT cable-laying ship that was built as a freight ferry. She was built in 1983 as Siegelberg and completed in 1985 for Romanian owners as Tuzla. In 1996 she was renamed Bolero. The ship was renamed Lodbrog after conversion to a cable layer in 2001.

== Description ==
As built, the ship was 140.14 metres (459 ft 9 in) long, with a beam of 21.01 metres (68 ft 11 in) and a depth of 6.45 metres (21 ft 2 in). She tonnages were 10,243 GT and 6,045 NT. The ship was powered by two 12-cylinder Halberstadt diesel engines of 10,600 kilowatts (14,200 hp), which can propel the ship at 14.5 knots (26.9 km/h; 16.7 mph). The ship had 1,084 metres (1,185 yd) lane capacity and could carry 12 passengers.

== History ==
The ship was built as yard number 154 by VEB Mathias Thesen Werft, Wismar, East Germany. She was launched on 29 November 1983 as Siegelberg and then laid up unfinished. In 1985, she was completed as Tuzla for Compania de Navigatie Romline, Constanța, Romania. The IMO number 8306591 was allocated. She served in the Black Sea. on 12 May 1990, Tuzla was involved in a collision with the Soviet ship MV Andrey Kizhevatov. In 1993, she was placed under the Cypriot flag, with Limassol as her port of registry. She was placed back under the Romanian flag in 1995.

From 28 April 1996, Tuzla was chartered by Seatruck Ferries and renamed Bolero. She was one of the first two ferries chartered by Seatruck. Bolero was employed on the Heysham–Warrenpoint route. On 14 May 1997, she was chartered by Argoman and employed on the Harwich–Cuxhaven–Turku route until the charter ended on 28 May 1997. Between June and August 1997, Bolero was chartered by Estline and employed on the Stockholm–Tallinn route. In September 1997 she was chartered to Norfolk Line and employed on the Felixstowe–Scheveningen route.

On 16 October 2000, Bolero was sold to Alcatel Submarine Networks Marine, Copenhagen, Denmark, and was renamed Lodbrog. She was laid up in Leirvik, Norway. In 2001 she was rebuilt as a cable-laying ship by Remontowa, Gdańsk, Poland. The rebuilt resulted in her being assessed as 9,983 GT, 2,995 NT. She is now powered by two SKL Magdeburg diesel engines of 5,299 kilowatts (7,106 hp) each.

In October 2024, along with the British cruise ship MS Queen Elizabeth, the Lodbrog responded to the mayday and eventual sinking of the Royal New Zealand Navy ship HMNZS Manawanui.
