= List of submarine communications cables =

- List of domestic submarine communications cables
- List of international submarine communications cables
