= SMAP (disambiguation) =

SMAP was a Japanese boy band formed by Johnny & Associates.

SMAP may also refer to:

- Simple Mail Access Protocol, an Internet protocol for email delivery
- Soil Moisture Active Passive, an American environmental research satellite
- Supervisor Mode Access Prevention, a computer processor feature
- SMAP (submarine communications cable), a submarine communications cable connecting the Australian cities of Sydney, Melbourne, Adelaide and Perth
