= Kinyras =

Kinyras or KINYRAS may refer to:

== Ancient Mythology ==
- Cinyras, mythological son of Apollo and father of Adonis
- Kinnaru, an Ugaritic god who was a deification of the lyre, or some other string instruments

== Other names ==
- APOP Kinyras Peyias FC, a Cypriot football club
- KINYRAS, a submarine telecommunications cable system in Cyprus
