= Melissa Ross =

New Zealand Navy officer

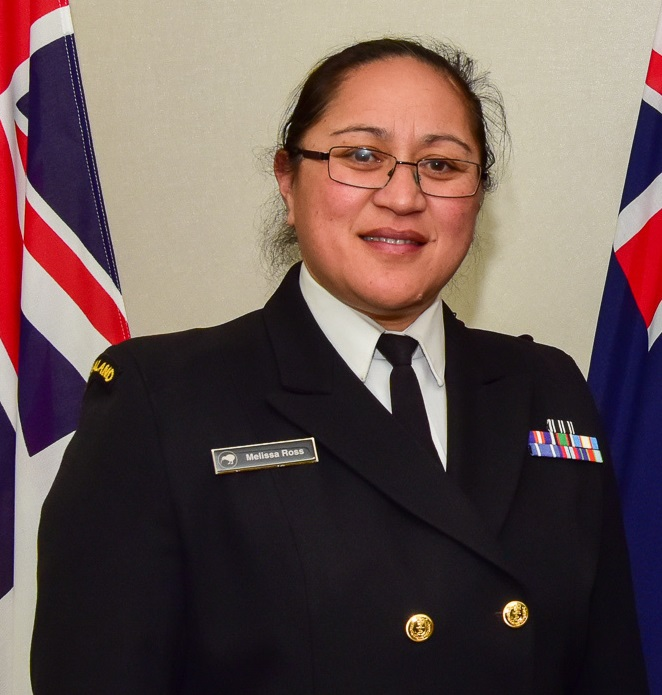
- Commodore Melissa Ross in September 2022
- Military career
- Service: Royal New Zealand Navy
- Service years: 1993 - current
- Rank: Commodore
- Commands: Deputy Chief of Navy (2019-2022); Commander Logistics (2022-current)

Commodore Melissa Ross is a senior officer in the Royal New Zealand Navy.

== Biography ==
Ross was born in the Hokianga area of New Zealand and grew up in Kawerau. She is a Māori woman of Ngāpuhi descent. After completing school Ross moved to Christchurch and studied engineering.

In 1993, Ross enlisted in the Royal New Zealand Navy (RNZN) and became a marine engineer. She was aged 20 at the time. Ross was among the first women to be posted to the RNZN's frigates. The ships had originally been built to be crewed by only male sailors, and arrangements for female sailors were at times unsatisfactory. She served initially on board HMNZS Southland and later on HMNZS Wellington. During her period with Wellington, Ross took part in a deployment to the Persian Gulf where the ship enforced sanctions against Iraq.

Later in her naval career Ross was involved with bringing the frigate HMNZS Te Mana into service and the commissioning of the multi-role vessel HMNZS Canterbury. She also helped to establish the New Zealand Defence Force Women's Development Steering Group. Ross has completed two master's degrees, including one at the Dwight D. Eisenhower School for National Security and Resource Strategy in Washington, D.C.

On 6 December 2019, Ross was promoted to the rank of commodore and became the Deputy Chief of Navy. She was both the first woman to hold this rank and the first female Deputy Chief of Navy in the RNZN. She completed this posting in late 2022 and was appointed as Commander Logistics in the RNZN, also being the first woman to hold this role.

In October 2024 Ross was appointed the head of the court of inquiry responsible for investigating the sinking of the dive and hydrographic vessel HMNZS Manawanui off Samoa that month. The interim report released in November 2024 found that the ship had been lost due to human errors. The court of inquiry's final report was published on 4 April 2025. At a press conference held that day, Ross stated that Manawanui had been lost due to "a series of human errors".
