= Australia Singapore Cable =

Fibre-optics submarine communications cable

- Cable type: Fibre-optic
- Construction beginning: 2018
- Construction finished: 2018
- First traffic: September 2018
- Design capacity: 60 Tbit/s
- Built by: Alcatel Submarine Networks
- Landing points: Perth, Australia; Flying Fish Cove, Christmas Island; Anyer, Indonesia; Tanah Merah, Singapore
- Owner(s): Vocus Group
- Website: Official website

The Australia Singapore Cable (ASC) is a 4,600 km fibre-optic submarine communications cable that entered service in September 2018, linking Australia and Singapore via Christmas Island and Indonesia. The cable consists of four fibre pairs and had an initial design capacity of 40 terabits per second.

ASC is owned and operated by Vocus Communications and is interconnected with the Vocus Australian domestic optical fibre network at the Equinix landing station in Perth.

== Landing points ==
1. Perth, Western Australia
2. Flying Fish Cove, Christmas Island
3. Anyer, Indonesia
4. Tanah Merah, Singapore

== History ==
The project was originally conceived in 2011 by Nextgen Networks, who were targeting a completion date of 2013. Construction did not proceed, and in 2015 Nextgen revived the plans, signing an agreement with Vocus to form a 50/50 joint venture to build the cable. In June 2016, Vocus acquired Nextgen. Vocus subsequently signed a manufacturing and installation contract with Alcatel Submarine Networks in December.

In April 2017, manufacturing of the cable commenced.

The cable went live on 4 September 2018, earlier than expected, to mitigate issues from a cut on the SEA-ME-WE 3 cable. Final costs were estimated at approximately US$170 million.

In 2019 the cable was upgraded to a total design capacity of 60 Tbit/s.

In 2021, Vocus announced that a new 1,000km cable segment would installed between the main trunk of ASC and Port Hedland, Western Australia. It was interconnected with the existing North West Cable System (NWCS) at Port Hedland to form a new cable known as the Darwin-Jakarta-Singapore Cable (DJSC), at a cost of A$100 million. The new segment went live in May 2023.

== Service Disruptions ==
On 1 August 2021, the cable was damaged after a ship operated by Maersk caught a portion of the cable with its anchor, disrupting Perth operations. The captain of the ship was detained by the Australian Federal Police. Normal operations resumed by 13 August after repairs were made.

On 4 September 2026, the cable experienced a break on the Indonesia to Singapore segment. On 11 September, Vocus implemented an additional network path between Singapore and Jakarta, which enabled temporary restoration of Layer 2 Ethernet services. On the 18th of September, Vocus advised the fault was located in Indonesian waters, approximately 615km from the Singapore landing station. Additionally, while the ASC fault had priority for repair over a fault on the competing Indigo West cable, Vocus had agreed to sequence the repair of Indigo West ahead of ASC to provide a quicker restoration of service between Singapore and Australia since the affected section of ASC would need to be powered down for repairs. Vocus also estimated that the repair of ASC would be completed on 4 November.

== See also ==
- List of international submarine communications cables
