= BigAir =

BigAir Group Limited
- Type: Subsidiary
- Industry: Telecommunications
- Founded: Sydney (2002)
- Headquarters: Sydney
- Area served: Australia
- Key people: Jason Ashton (Founder)
- Products: Fixed wireless Internet access Managed access VoIP
- Number of employees: 220 (2015)
- Parent: Superloop
- Website: bigair.com.au

BigAir was a telecommunications company in Australia that was listed on the Australian Stock Exchange (ASX). The company was acquired by Superloop, with the last day of trading of Big Air shares being 9 December 2016.

BigAir managed one of the largest metropolitan fixed wireless networks in Australia. They provided an alternative to the Australian terrestrial networks including DSL and the National Broadband Network with symmetric Internet access services at speeds up to 1 Gbit/s using WiMAX technology. A branch of the company; BigAir Community Broadband, managed residential style internet services provided to student accommodation and mining camps across Australia.

== Acquisition history ==
In June 2006, BigAir acquired customers who used the iBurst technology from T3 Wireless, a subsidiary of Pacific Internet. The iBurst business was shut down in 2009.

In April 2010 BigAir acquired Wizz Communications. The acquisition of this wholesale fixed wireless point-to-point business gave BigAir new base stations in the major cities. In July 2010 BigAir announced it had acquired the assets and customer base of the wholesale broadband division of Star-Tech Communications.

In January 2011 BigAir acquired Clever Communications located in Melbourne, Australia. Also in January 2011, BigAir announced its acquisition of AccessPlus. AccessPlus provided managed Internet services to tertiary student accommodation at more than 20 sites across Australia. The investment by BigAir was $5 million.

In May 2012 BigAir acquired wireless-broadband and student accommodation internet provider Allegro for $7.5 million and an additional sum of up to $3 million depending on the revenue from Allegro in the 2013 financial year; expected to be between 5–6 million. This extends the existing BigAir network in QLD and adds Gladstone and Mackay to the areas of coverage, as well as allowing BigAir to make use of Allegro's existing 3.5 GHz spectrum allocation for WiMAX services.

In August 2013 BigAir purchased Perth-based telecommunications provider, Intelligent IP Communications (IIPC) for $10 million with an additional sum of up to $10 million based on the performance of IIPC in 2014 and 2015 financial years. This secured BigAir 550 new customers including remote Australian mining site customers and contracts as well as an established voice and video communications platform deployed by IIPC Australia-wide.

== Products ==
=== BigAir Fixed Wireless ===
The BigAir fixed wireless service is positioned as an alternative or backup solution for traditional fixed line (Copper and Fibre Optic services) which is characterized by the ability to offer services speeds from 1 Mbit/s to 1 Gbit/s with a reduced deployment time compared to traditional fixed line services, due to removal of the lengthy times normally involved with trenching cables.

=== BigAir Community Broadband ===
BigAir Community Broadband was formed from the acquisition of both StarTech Communications and AccessPlus in 2010 and 2011, and leverages existing BigAir fixed wireless infrastructure to service multi-tenanted properties including mining camps, retirement villages and higher education student housing providers including CLV, Unilodge and Urbanest covering 30,000 rooms

=== Wireless Hotspots ===
BigAir also manages a number of free access wireless hotspot networks in Australia. The public locations covered provide services to shopping centers, council libraries and caravan parks, retail store chains and pop-up services for temporary events (Festivals and Sporting events).

== See also ==
- List of VOIP companies
