= Exetel =

Australian internet service provider

Exetel Pty Ltd
- Company type: Subsidiary
- Industry: Telecommunications
- Founded: 29 August 2001
- Founder: John Linton
- Headquarters: Sydney, Australia
- Area served: Australia
- Key people: Annette Linton (Chair); Richard Purdy (CEO)
- Products: Broadband internet; mobile phone services
- Services: NBN FTTP broadband; NBN HFC broadband; Mobile services (via Telstra Wholesale Mobile Network); Grandfathered services (FTTN, FTTC, FTTB, Fixed Wireless, ADSL/ADSL2+, home wireless broadband, mobile broadband, VoIP, POTS telephony, web hosting)
- Number of employees: 300
- Parent: Superloop Limited
- Website: www.exetel.com.au

Exetel is an Australian Internet service provider (ISP) primarily focused on delivering residential NBN broadband and mobile services to customers across Australia. Exetel is headquartered in Sydney and is a wholly owned subsidiary of Superloop Limited. The company delivers its broadband services over infrastructure operated by its parent company, including the Superloop national fibre backbone.

In 2025, Exetel simplified its product range by introducing the “One Plan”, a single 500/50 Mbps NBN service, replacing its previous multi-tiered offerings and time-limited promotional discounts. Around the same time, Exetel also streamlined its mobile portfolio with the introduction of the “Plus One” plan, aligning its mobile offerings with its simplified, single-plan product model.

As part of this shift, Exetel now sells NBN Fibre to the Premises (FTTP) and Hybrid Fibre-Coaxial (HFC) plans to new residential customers, with other NBN access technologies supported only for existing services. Mobile services are provided through the Telstra Wholesale mobile network.

== History ==
Exetel began operating in the early 1990s as a technology consulting company, providing technical and management consulting services until December 2003, when the business shifted its focus to becoming a provider of data and telephone communications services.

The company began offering ADSL1 services in mid-February 2004, SHDSL corporate services in April 2004, and wireless broadband through Unwired in June 2004. Towards the end of 2004, Exetel added wire-line telephony services using the Verizon network and mobile services using the Vodafone network. Exetel activated its own VoIP switches in March 2006 and began offering ADSL2+ services on 20 July 2006.

In 2007, Exetel was recognised in Deloitte’s Technology Fast 50 program, which highlights rapidly growing Australian technology companies.

Historically, Exetel maintained various network points of presence (PoPs) across several Australian states and in Auckland, New Zealand.

In June 2021, Superloop Limited announced the acquisition of Exetel Pty Ltd for A$110 million in cash and shares.

Following the acquisition, Exetel’s network operations were progressively integrated into Superloop’s national fibre backbone and data-centre footprint, which now provide the core network infrastructure for its broadband services. Superloop’s Australian fibre backbone connects 16 major data centres in Sydney, forming the company’s largest domestic network presence. Exetel also benefits from Superloop’s international connectivity through the INDIGO subsea cable system, which provides a high-capacity route between Sydney and Singapore with a design capacity of up to 36 Tbps.

In 2025, Superloop’s national fibre network—over which Exetel delivers its broadband services—was recognised by Ookla in its H1 2025 “Fastest Fixed Network” awards report. The award was based on more than 18 million consumer-initiated Speedtest results collected between January and June 2025.

== Exetel "One Plan" Launch and Simplification ==
In July 2025, Exetel made a significant change to its retail broadband strategy by discontinuing its previous range of NBN and fibre-based plans and replacing them with a single, flat-rate product marketed as the “One Plan”.

The One Plan offers 500 Mbps download and 50 Mbps upload speeds with a Typical Evening Speed (TES) of 500/40 Mbps for A$80 per month, and includes unlimited data. It was introduced to simplify customer choice and remove introductory or time-limited promotional pricing. The plan is available only to premises served by NBN Fibre to the Premises (FTTP) and Hybrid Fibre-Coaxial (HFC) technologies.

Superloop’s Group Executive of Consumer, Mehul Dave, stated that the launch aimed to reduce “intentional confusion” and complex plan structures that he said were common in the telecommunications industry.

Customers on legacy NBN technologies such as Fibre to the Node (FTTN) and Fibre to the Curb (FTTC) remained on their existing plans but could migrate to the One Plan once their premises were upgraded to FTTP under the NBN fibre-upgrade program.

Optional add-ons available through the Exetel app include:

- Warp Speed – a 24-hour temporary speed upgrade to approximately 1 Gbps (TES 860/85 Mbps) for A$1 per day.
- Hibernate Mode – slows the service to roughly 12/1 Mbps in exchange for an A$1 per-day discount.
- Refer-a-Friend – provides A$1 off per month for both the referrer and referee for as long as both remain active customers.

In its FY25 full-year results, Superloop Limited reported group revenue of A$546.5 million (up 31%) and consumer-segment revenue of A$363.7 million (up 37%), with 63,000 net new consumer customers. Superloop attributed part of this growth to the One Plan launch, noting that Exetel achieved 17,000 net new consumer additions within the first seven weeks of release.

Superloop described the launch as a simplification of Exetel’s product offering, consolidating multiple NBN speed tiers into a single plan at a consistent price point while maintaining support for existing customers on legacy broadband technologies.

== Services ==
Exetel provides residential broadband and mobile services across Australia. Its current product range focuses on NBN Fibre-to-the-Premises (FTTP) and NBN Hybrid Fibre-Coaxial (HFC) broadband, along with mobile services delivered via the Telstra Wholesale mobile network.

=== Current services (available to new customers) ===
- NBN Fibre-to-the-Premises (FTTP) broadband
- NBN Hybrid Fibre-Coaxial (HFC) broadband
- Mobile voice and data services delivered via the Telstra Wholesale mobile network

=== Grandfathered services (available only to existing customers; no longer sold) ===
- NBN Fibre-to-the-Node (FTTN)
- NBN Fibre-to-the-Curb (FTTC)
- NBN Fibre-to-the-Building (FTTB)
- NBN Fixed Wireless
- Mobile services delivered via the Optus mobile network
- Mobile broadband services
- Home wireless broadband services
- ADSL / ADSL2+
- Wireless Ethernet
- Mid-Band Ethernet / Ethernet over copper
- Ethernet over fibre
- Residential and business web hosting
- VoIP
- POTS telephony
