= HMNZS Manawanui (2019) =

New Zealand naval support vessel

Coordinates: 14.0240°S 171.8250°W

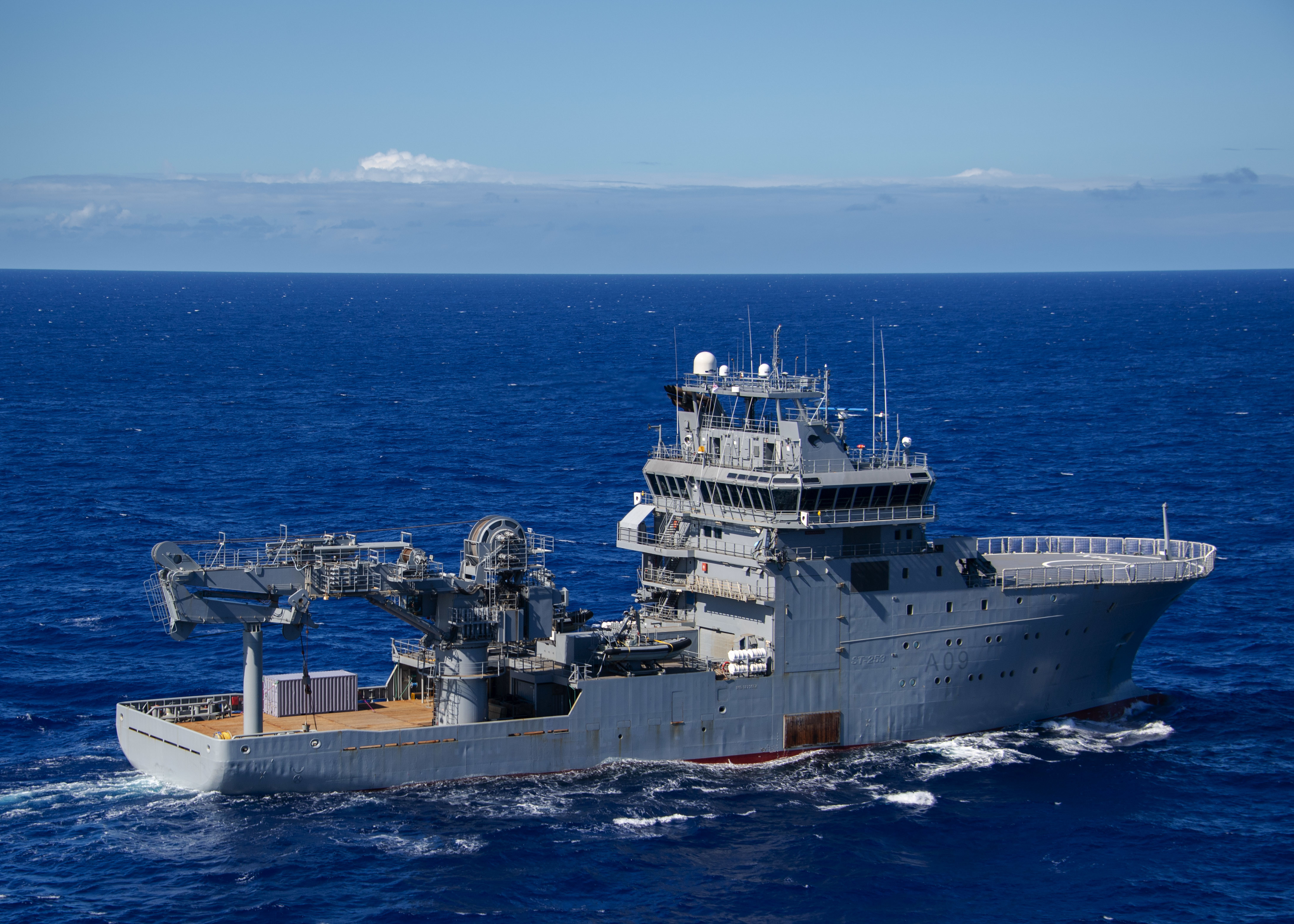
- HMNZS Manawanui during RIMPAC 2020

History

Norway
- Name: Edda Fonn
- Builder: Myklebust Verft AS
- Launched: 2003
- Acquired: May 2003
- Fate: Sold to Royal New Zealand Navy in August 2018

New Zealand
- Name: HMNZS Manawanui
- Namesake: Māori: "to be brave or steadfast"
- Cost: NZ$147 million 2018
- Sponsored by: Jacinda Ardern
- Christened: 7 June 2019
- Commissioned: 7 June 2019
- Home port: Gisborne
- Identification: IMO number: 9273662; MMSI number: 512457000
- Fate: Sank on 6 October 2024, Upolu, Samoa

General characteristics
- Type: Littoral operations vessel; Hydrographic and diving support
- Displacement: 5,741 tonnes full load
- Length: 84.7 m (277 ft 11 in)
- Beam: 18.0 m (59 ft 1 in)
- Draught: 6.8 m (22 ft 4 in)
- Propulsion: 4 × 1,920 kW (2,570 hp); 7,680 kW (10,300 bhp) total
- Speed: 13 knots (24 km/h)
- Range: 7,000 nmi (13,000 km)
- Capacity: 700 m^{2} (7,500 sq ft) deck area; 800 tonnes deck cargo; 100 tonne crane; 66 passengers
- Complement: 39 core crew

HMNZS Manawanui was a dive and hydrographic vessel of the Royal New Zealand Navy (RNZN). It had previously served as the civilian survey vessel MV Edda Fonn in the Norwegian oil and gas industry. The ship was purchased for the RNZN in 2018, and commissioned on 7 June 2019, replacing the hydrographic survey ship HMNZS Resolution and diving support vessel HMNZS Manawanui (A09).

Manawanui entered operational service in early 2020 and undertook multiple deployments in the Pacific over subsequent years, participating in RIMPAC 2020 and supporting operations in the aftermath of Cyclone Gabrielle in 2023.

Manawanui sank on 6 October 2024 after running aground while surveying a reef off the coast of Samoa. All 75 people on board Manawanui were rescued. In late November 2024, the first report from the naval inquiry into the Manawanui's sinking attributed the sinking to human error. In early April 2025, the naval inquiry's final report concluded that the sinking was the result of human error. Following a disciplinary investigation, charges were laid against three naval officers, including her former captain, in February 2026.

== Civil career and conversion ==
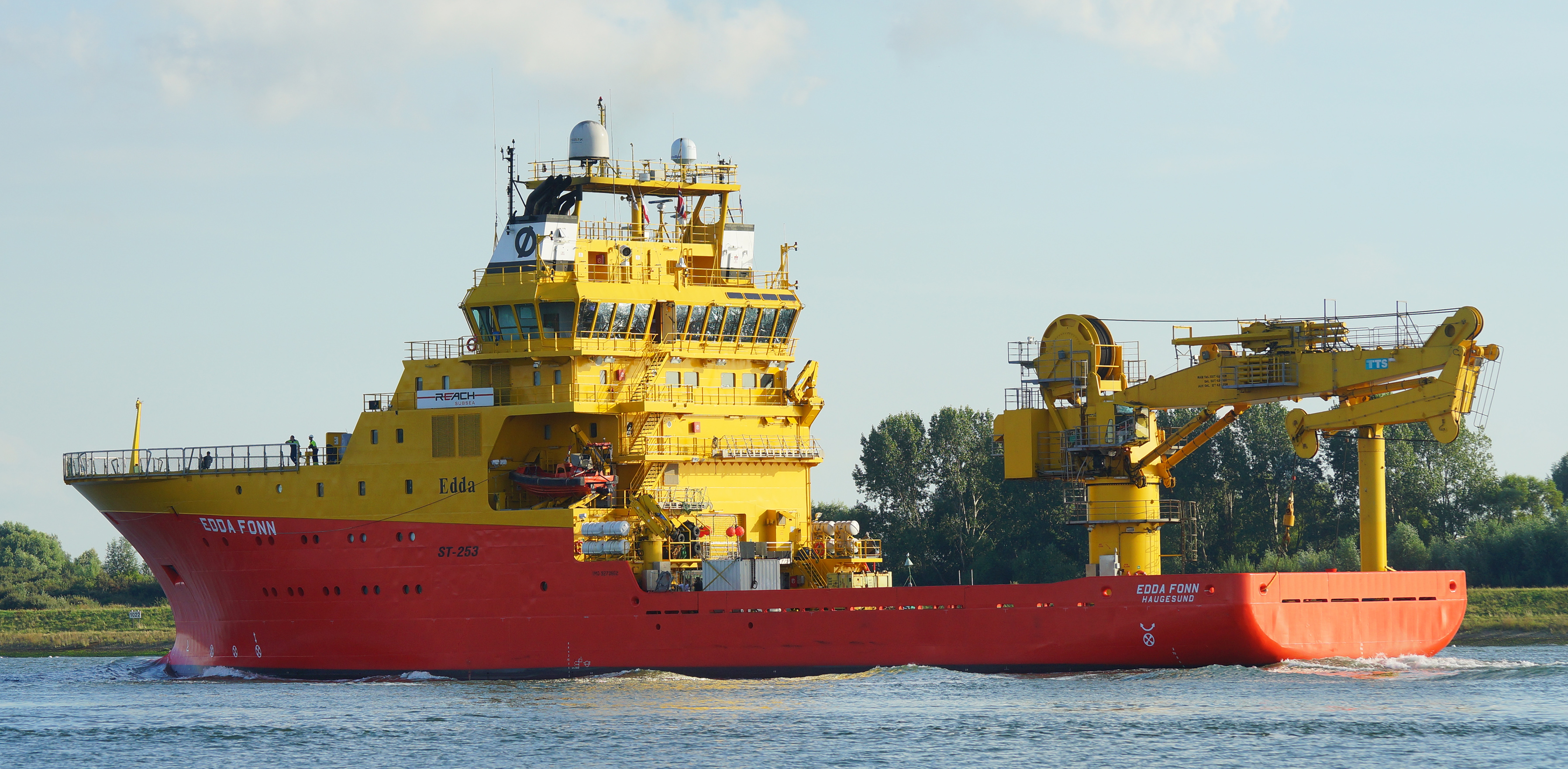
MV Edda Fonn at Rotterdam in 2003

The ship was built in 2003 by Myklebust Verft and delivered in May as MV Edda Fonn to Østensjø Rederi to serve as a survey vessel for work in the oil and gas industry. It was based in Haugesund, Norway. Edda Fonn was chartered out to the Norwegian subsea service provider Reach Subsea in December 2014, completing survey and inspection tasks in the North Sea. In February 2017 the ship was tasked with inspecting pipelines in the Mediterranean Sea between Algeria and Spain.

In August 2018 Edda Fonn was purchased by the Royal New Zealand Navy (RNZN) at a cost of $103 million to replace the hydrographic support ship HMNZS Resolution and the diving support vessel HMNZS Manawanui (A09). The New Zealand government had originally planned to purchase a newly built ship for these roles, with work on this project beginning in 2013. After NZ$148 million of funding for the project was diverted in 2017 to cover the unexpectedly high costs of upgrading the RNZN's two Anzac-class frigates it was decided to acquire a second-hand vessel instead. New Zealand Ministry of Defence officials reviewed 150 vessels before identifying Edda Fonn as suitable for conversion.

Edda Fonn underwent initial work at Orskov Yard in Frederikshavn, Denmark. The moonpool and remotely operated underwater vehicle hangar were remodelled, and specialist equipment including a multibeam echosounder, diving launch and recovery system, and davits were installed. It was also repainted in RNZN colours.

== Operational history ==
The ship arrived in New Zealand in May 2019. Renamed, HMNZS Manawanui was commissioned into the RNZN on 7 June. Prime Minister Jacinda Ardern was the ship's sponsor. At the time of commissioning it was intended that the ship would serve with the navy for 15 years. Manawanui was based at the Devonport Naval Base. Its honorary home port was Gisborne. The ship's first commanding officer was Lieutenant Commander Andy Mahoney.

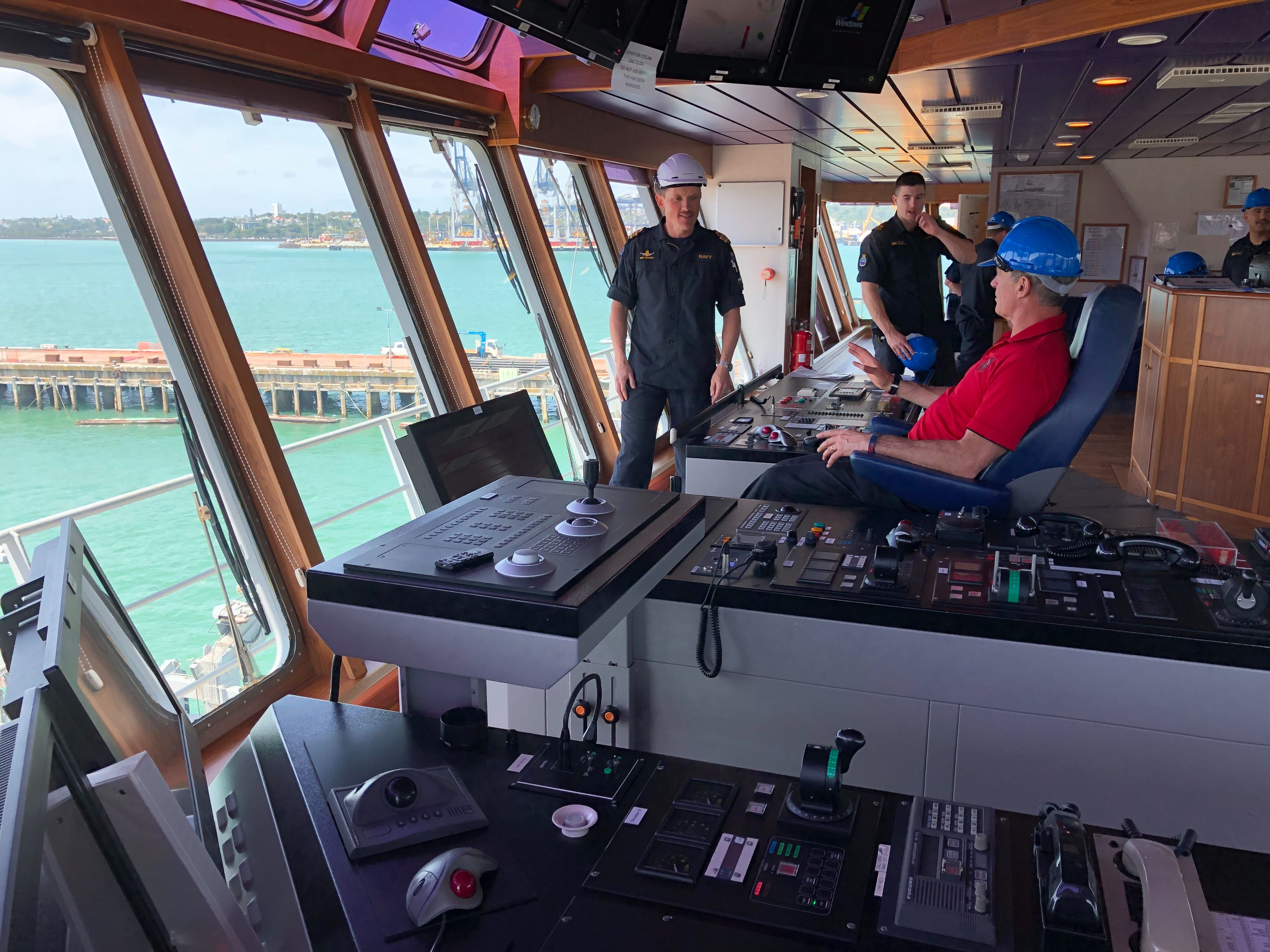
US Ambassador to New Zealand Scott Brown on the bridge of Manawanui in November 2019

After being commissioned, Manawanui required further modifications to be fitted with communications equipment and items specific to a military role. These works were originally scheduled to be completed by November 2019 but were delayed due to technical problems and the impact of the COVID-19 pandemic. The inability of foreign contractors to travel to New Zealand during the pandemic was one of the causes of the delays. Bad weather and difficulties with fitting new equipment to the ship also contributed. Most of the modifications had been made by mid-2020 but the project was not completed until September 2023. Manawanui was able to be used for much of this period, with new capabilities being added as elements of the modifications were completed.

Manawanui completed its initial safety and readiness checks in February 2020. It received interim operational release that month, which was earlier than the initially planned date of April 2021. This change was made to allow the ship to participate in that year's RIMPAC military exercise off Hawaii. Manawanui took part in this exercise during August 2020. During the exercise Manawanui operated with warships from Australia, Brunei and Singapore. As a result of COVID-19 restrictions its crew was unable to disembark the ship during the deployment.

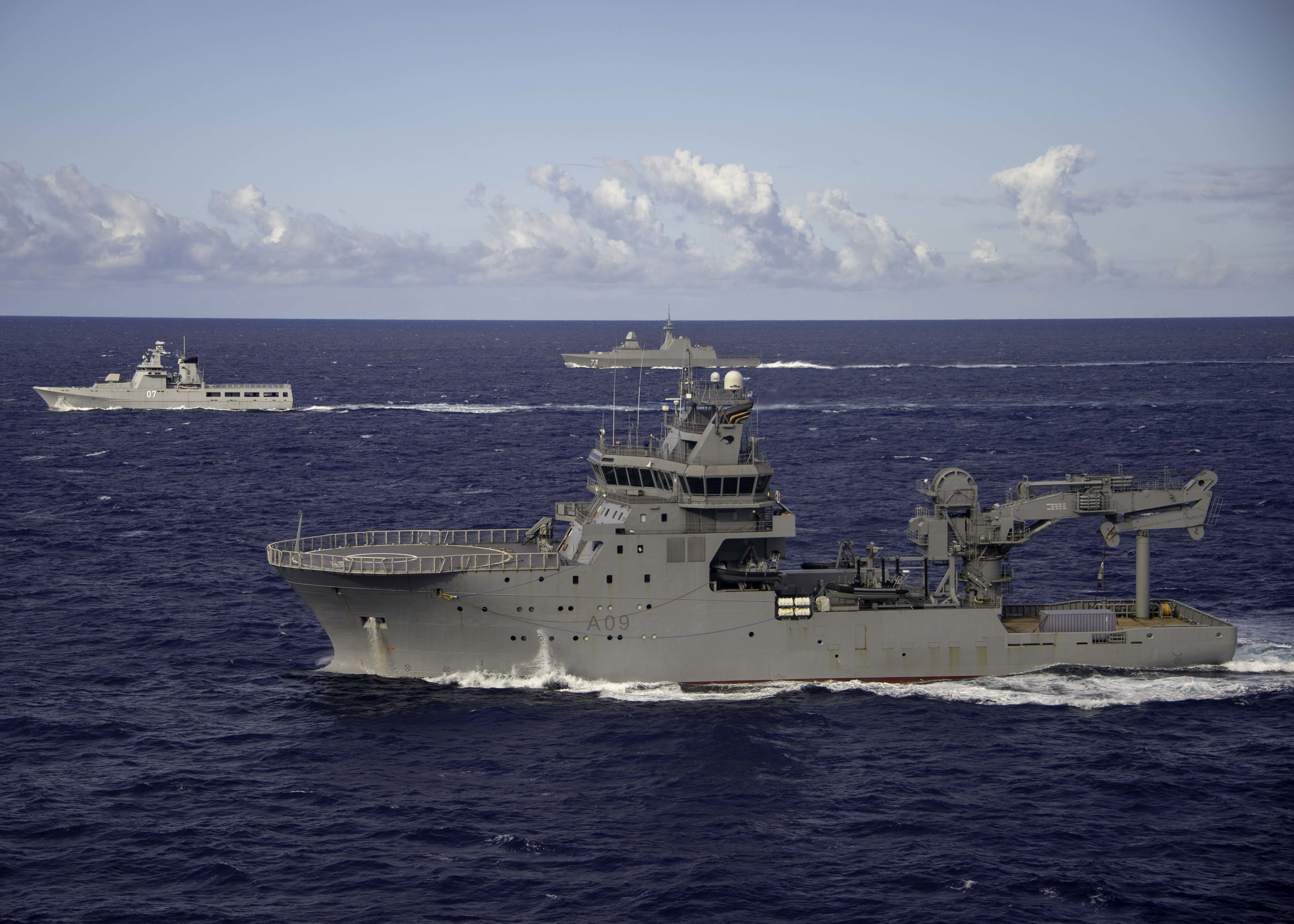
Manawanui sailing in formation with other vessels during Exercise RIMPAC 2020

During 2021 Manawanui received a range of modifications and two new engines. These works were delayed by the strict COVID-19 lockdown in Auckland that year. Sea trials were undertaken in March 2022.

In September 2022 Manawanui was part of a multinational operation to remove World War II ordnance in Tuvalu. On 9 December 2022, Commander Yvonne Gray took the command of Manawanui. Gray, originally an officer in the Royal Navy of the United Kingdom, moved to New Zealand in 2012.

During February 2023 Manawanui provided support to the area around Gisborne in New Zealand in the aftermath of Cyclone Gabrielle. This included assessing damage to Gisborne's port and transporting supplies. During the same month the ship was used to carry 3.2 tonnes of cocaine to New Zealand after it was seized by the police during an operation in which the drugs were intercepted after they had been dropped in the Pacific Ocean ahead of being smuggled into Australia. In November 2023 it conducted undersea surveys and disposal of World War II bombs in Niue, Fiji, and Vanuatu.

In 2024 the vessel carried out three deployments to the South West Pacific, including visits to Kermadec Islands, Samoa, Tokelau and Niue. In its final deployment the vessel sailed from Devonport on 28 September, intending to return to port on 1 November.

== Sinking ==
=== Loss ===
On the evening of 5 October 2024 Manawanui ran aground around one nautical mile (1.9 km; 1.2 mi) off Siumu, on the south coast of Upolu island, Samoa, whilst carrying out survey work of a reef in rough seas and high winds. Commander Yvonne Gray gave the order for everyone to abandon the ship. All 75 crew on board were evacuated by four of the vessel's life rafts and two rigid hull inflatable boats early on 6 October. Rescue efforts were managed by the New Zealand Rescue Coordination Centre and the Royal New Zealand Air Force deployed a Boeing P-8A Poseidon aircraft to assist. The evacuation began at 7:52 p.m. on 5 October. Due to challenging weather conditions it took five hours for the lifeboats to reach the shore. One of the rescue boats flipped over during the journey and its occupants walked to shore via the reef. At 10:00 p.m., the British cruise ship MS Queen Elizabeth and Danish cable-laying ship MS Lodbrog responding to the mayday arrived on scene to render aid.

The vessel caught fire by 6:40 a.m. on 6 October and capsized and sank by 9:00 a.m. At least 17 people were injured in the incident, many from cuts and abrasions from walking on the reef, and three received hospital treatment, including one for a dislocated shoulder. The crew and passengers, including seven scientists and four personnel from foreign militaries, were accommodated in Samoa before being flown to New Zealand. The RNZN was carrying out works to salvage the vessel and mitigate the environmental impact of the sinking. On 7 October local residents reported seeing and smelling oil near the wreck. The acting Samoan Prime Minister Tuala Iosefo Ponifasio said in a press statement, "HMNZS Manawanui is not recoverable and has sunk into the ocean."

The vessel is the first New Zealand naval vessel to be unintentionally sunk since World War II and the first to be lost in peacetime.

=== Timeline ===
Friday 4 October 2024

22:00- Survey of Sinalei Reef commences.

Saturday 5 October 2024

18:11:13- Ship alters course to 340° in manual control.

18:13:08- Ship placed into autopilot.

18:14:47- Helm attempts course alteration to starboard. Ship fails to alter course.

18:15:20- ECDIS alarm heard.

18:15:29-18:15:53- Increased demand on angle and power of thrusters.

18:15:57- Helm announces "no steering to starboard".

18:16:18- Helm announces “it’s not really doing what I want it to do.”

18:16:18-18:16:43- Crewmembers attempt to control the ship, again announcing "it's not really doing what I want it to do."

18:16:55 Captain called to the bridge.

18:17:18- "Nautical Emergency" piped.

18:17:20- Captain arrives on bridge.

18:17:21-18:17:59- Crew continue to attempt to retake control of the ship.

18:17:59- Ship runs aground on the reef.

18:18:37- Emergency stations piped. Searches throughout the ship for damage and injuries commence.

18:18:49- Machinery Breakdown piped.

18:18:55-18:25:10- Crew search the ship, engineers close up and discussions continue on bridge about how to take control of the ship.

18:25:39- Searches complete.

18:27:34- Discussion about “do you want to take it out of auto now?”

18:27:43- Propulsion control regained, control switched from auto to manual.

18:28:00-18:42:40- Crew continues to attempt to stabilise the ship. Further grounding noises heard at 18:32:06.

18:43:20- Mayday call made.

18:46:45- Captain pipes to prepare to abandon ship.

18:48:40- “Hands to liferaft stations, Hands to liferaft stations.” piped.

18:48:55- Captain pipes crew to tell them to prepare for their time in the liferafts, by wearing extra clothing and using the toilet.

18:50:00-18:50:10- Captain expedites the abandon ship due to the increasing roll of the ship.

18:54:20- Captain orders lifeboats to be launched.

18:55:00- Ship abandoned.

Sunday 6 October 2024

~06:40- Fire begins on stricken ship.

~09:00- Ship capsizes and sinks.

=== Impact ===
At the time of the sinking, Manawanui was carrying 950 tonnes of diesel fuel. On 8 October local Samoan residents reported that the sinking caused an oil spill which threatened tourism and fishing in the local area. On the same day, the RNZN stated that while oil had leaked from Manawanui as it sank naval divers who had inspected the wreck had not detected anything leaking from it. The Samoan Government concurred with this assessment. At this time the wreck was 30 metres (98 ft) below the surface, with the ship lying on its side. The RNZN was considering options to remove fuels and other chemicals from the wreck. On 11 October local fishers reported fish covered in oil, and Samoan authorities confirmed a leak of 200,000 litres (44,000 imp gal; 53,000 US gal) of diesel and damage to the reef. The crew of a RNZAF Poseidon who overflew the wreck on this day also sighted a slick. RNZN divers determined that there was a leak emanating from the ship's engine room.

Local Samoan residents expressed concerns about the impact of the ship's sinking on the maritime environment, and called for compensation and an independent inquiry. Tafitoala village representative Taloaileono Vasasou said that the oil leak was polluting the coast and contaminating their clam reserve while the senior matai (chief) of Vaiee village Tuia Paepae Letoa reported that fish caught in the area were covered with oil. Residents of the Safata district convened a meeting to discuss the impact of the sinking and demand compensation. Due to the sinking, a 20 km (12 mi) stretch of coastal area near the wreckage site was closed to fishing on 7 October. Tafitoala matai and fisherman Afoa Patolo Afoa said that the sinking and resulting fishing ban would affect the livelihoods of many local residents.

In late November 2024 former Samoan Member of Parliament Tuia Pu'a Leota told Radio New Zealand that food supplies in the local district were low and called on both the Samoan and New Zealand governments to provide local communities with more information. He said that the impact of the ship's sinking was devastating for local villagers who depended on fishing for food and income.

In early February 2025 Radio New Zealand reported that villagers in the Safata district had sought financial assistance from the Chinese Embassy in response to the Samoan government declining a request to provide affected communities with income and aid. Local villagers have not been allowed to fish in their area since the sinking of HMNZS Manawanui. According to Safata district spokesperson Tuai Pu'a Leota, the Samoan and New Zealand governments had not adequately consulted with local village leaders or provided financial compensation. By 7 February Safata district community leaders had met with Chinese Embassy staff in Apia, who gave an initial donation of WST$50,000 (NZ$30,000) to assist with livelihood assistance.

On 12 February the Samoan Government lifted a 20 km "precautionary zone" around the wreckage of HMNZS Manawanui following testing by the Scientific Research Organisation of Samoa (SROS). However, a two km prohibition zone around the sunken ship remains in force. On 25 January 2025, the Samoan Ministry of Works, Transport and Infrastructure's CEO Fui Tupai Mau Simanu confirmed to RNZ Pacific that the Samoan and New Zealand governments were discussing compensation over the Manawanui sinking at the request of affected communities. In late May 2025, RNZ Pacific reported that local villagers were still reluctant to fish in the area due to fears of contamination despite the Marine Pollution Advisory Committee advising it was safe to collect seafood.

On 6 October 2025, the New Zealand government agreed to pay Samoa 10 million tala (US$3.6 million; NZ$6 million) in compensation for the sinking. Some Tafitoala residents including Fagailesau Afaaso Junior Saleupu and Many Percival described the compensation amount of NZ$6 million as insufficient in managing the impact of the sinking on the local environment and questioned how the two governments would distribute the funds. New Zealand Foreign Minister Winston Peters defended the compensation amount, saying that this was the amount requested by the Samoan government.

=== Salvaging ===
On 15 October salvage work on Manawanui began. The New Zealand Defence Force (NZDF) salvage operation was called Operation Resolution and consisted of 60 personnel led by RNZN Deputy Chief of the Navy Commodore Andrew Brown. The NZDF was assisted by the Samoan government, Maritime New Zealand and Samoa's Maritime Pollution Advisory Committee (MPAC). The MPAC despatched divers to recover ship debris, conduct water contamination tests and develop a plan to remove the remaining fuel. MPAC chair Fui Mau Simanu reported that the sunken Manawanui and its anchor chain had caused substantial damage to the reef covering an area of 5,000 square metres (54,000 sq ft). In addition, the ship contained 960 tonnes of diesel fuel while three dislodged shipping containers were also causing damage to the reef. That same day, New Zealand Prime Minister Christopher Luxon formally apologised to the Samoan Prime Minister Fiamē Naomi Mataʻafa and acting prime minister for the sinking of Manawanui.

On 17 October the NZDF confirmed that it would work with Samoan contractor ARK Marine to remove the three shipping containers from the reef off the south-west coast of Upolu, commencing 18 October. Two of the containers were empty while one was carrying 3,000 kg (6,600 lb) of food. That same day, the NZDF confirmed that the crew of HMS Tamar had recovered Manawanui's navigation record book. The record book along with the ship's black box are expected to be used as key evidence in the court of inquiry. New Zealand Defence Minister Judith Collins also confirmed there were small oil leaks from Manawanui but said that Defence Force and Maritime New Zealand staff had not found any pollution on the shorelines or dead wildlife.

On 19 October the NZDF announced that work to mitigate pollution from the wreckage would be scaled down during the 2024 Commonwealth Heads of Government Meeting (CHOGM) scheduled for the following week. However, work to recover the three containers would continue over the weekend. That same day, Prime Minister Mataʻafa confirmed that dive and coastal operations in the Safata region would be temporarily suspended for a week. Samoan and New Zealand authorities agreed to focus on scaled-down monitoring and inspections during the week of the CHOGM. On 19 October, New Zealand and Samoan teams managed to remove one of the containers from the reef by nightfall. The two remaining containers, including the one containing food, were expected to be removed by 21 October depending on weather conditions.

On 20 October Radio New Zealand reported that an insurance surveyor had completed work on Manawanui. The MPAC confirmed that it would hire a contractor to remove the remaining fuel from the sunken ship. Committee chair Simanu said that fuel salvaging was expected to start in mid-November 2024 and last about 20 days depending on weather conditions. On 21 October, the NZDF confirmed that NZ and Samoan teams had successfully removed the second container containing food supplies. On 23 October, the third container was removed from the reef following four days of coordination between the NZDF, local contractor Ark Marine and the support of Samoan authorities. The containers were disposed of at a nearby port while the food supplies were buried in a landfill. On 24 October, the NZDF said it was unable to provide a timeframe for removing the ship and its fuel tanks from the reef.

On 1 November the NZDF stated that removing fuel would commence in November 2024. In response, University of Waikato associate professor in biodiversity and ecology Nick Ling expressed concern about the pace of the removal and the monitoring of oil leaks. On 18 November Deputy Chief of the Navy Andrew Brown confirmed that work to remove the fuel and other contaminants from HMNZS Manawanui is expected to commence in December 2024. Fuel removal will be carried out by salvage companies Pacific 7 and Bay Underwater Services NZ. On 25 November, the NZDF dispatched a barge carrying salvage crew and equipment to assist in removing oil and other pollutants from the southern coast of Upola. The barge was towed by an ocean-going tug on a voyage expected to last 10 to 11 days. On 24 December, the NZDF confirmed that the salvage barge had arrived off the south-west coast of Upolu island and would commence fuel extraction soon.

In early January 2025 the NZDF commenced the first cycle of fuel removal. The second cycle commenced in late January 2025 and lasted 17 days, concluding during the first week of February 2025. On 27 March, the NZDF confirmed that the Science Research Organisation of Samoa had reported that the seawater and marine life around the wreckage site was "clear and uncontaminated." NZDF commodore Andrew Brown also confirmed that salvors had cut access into the ship and retrieved weapons and ammunition from secure compartments. He also announced that independent experts were conducting a wreck assessment in the vicinity of the Manawanui including studies of the local reef and marine environment to help inform the next steps.

In late May 2025, the 2025 New Zealand budget allocated NZ$77 million to writing off the Manawanui for the 2024-2025 financial year. This sum included NZ$32 million for clean-up, salvage, and other remedial activities at the shipwreck site. By 30 May, Commodore Brown confirmed that the salvors' barge had returned to New Zealand with equipment and debris from the Manawanui which could not be repurposed, along with the tanktainers containing the unusable diesel fuel, oil and seawater mix, the azipod and the ship's anchors and chains. The NZDF also held a small ceremony to acknowledge the salvors, Pacific 7 Limited and Bay Underwater Services NZ limited. Brown also confirmed that the Defence Force was awaiting an independent draft wreck assessment.

=== Reactions ===
The sinking of Manawanui led to female members of the NZDF being subjected to abuse online and in person. Commander Gray was also abused by online commentators and was accused of being hired due to her gender. On 10 October the New Zealand Defence Minister Judith Collins condemned these activities, labelling them a "deeply concerning misogynistic narrative". The Chief of Navy, Rear Admiral Garin Golding, also called on the attacks to stop.

=== Court of inquiry ===
The loss of the ship was investigated by a naval court of inquiry. The court of inquiry was headed by Commodore Melissa Ross, who is a former Deputy Chief of Navy in the RNZN. The other members were Captain Andrew Mahoney from the RNZN, Group Captain John McWilliam from the Royal New Zealand Air Force and Captain Dean Battilana from the Royal Australian Navy.

On 20 November 2024, the interim Court of Inquiry report on the sinking was received by the Chief of the Navy. It was handed over to a King's Counsel for an independent legal review, with some of the key information released on 29 November. The inquiry found that human error was responsible for the sinking, including the failure by the crew to disengage the autopilot as the ship approached land and their belief that its failure to respond to commands to change direction was due to the failure of its thruster control. Former Samoan MP Tuia Pu'a Leota welcomed the initial finding and urged the Samoan government to do more to address local questions. Meanwhile, Victoria University of Wellington political scientist Iati Iati called for an international inquiry into the sinking of the Manawanui and criticised the timeframe of the New Zealand naval inquiry.

On 4 April 2025, the naval court of inquiry's final report confirmed that a series of human errors by two crew members (dubbed "Witness 2" and "Witness 4") had caused the sinking of the Manawanui. The report found that it took crew ten minutes to regain full control of the ship's propulsion system and that crew managed to disengage the autopilot. It also concluded that the ship sunk as a result of hull damage. Commodore Melissa Ross said that the captain's decision to evacuate the ship was the "right one." The final report found that the Captain and 19 other members of her crew were under-trained, with several lacking the necessary qualifications and experience to operate the Manawanui. The court of inquiry also found that the Manawanui was under-equipped for its hydrographic surveying mission in Samoa.

=== Disciplinary proceedings and court-martial ===
In November 2024, it was reported that separate disciplinary process would begun after the court of inquiry was complete, where three crew members (who were not initially named) may be disciplined. In April 2025, Chief of Navy Rear Admiral Garin Golding also confirmed that the RNZN would commence a "disciplinary investigation", which remained ongoing as of October 2025.

On 2 March 2026, it was reported that the NZDF had laid charges against three naval officers, with one officer charged with "negligently causing a ship to be lost" by failing to disengage the autopilot and take manual control, Lieutenant Commander Matthew Gajzago charged with "negligently permitting a ship to be lost", and Commander Yvonne Gray charged with "negligently permitting a ship to be lost, or in the alternative, negligently failing to perform a duty" and "negligently failing to perform a duty". The charges will be heard by a single court-martial. Gray has indicated that she will defend the charges during the court martial.

== Replacement ==
There is no planned replacement for HMNZS Manawanui. The offshore patrol vessel HMNZS Otago will take on the ship's role, but lacks some of Manawanui's specialised equipment.

== See also ==
- RV Tangaroa – NIWA ice-strengthened research ship
