= MS Queen Elizabeth =

Vista-class cruise ship

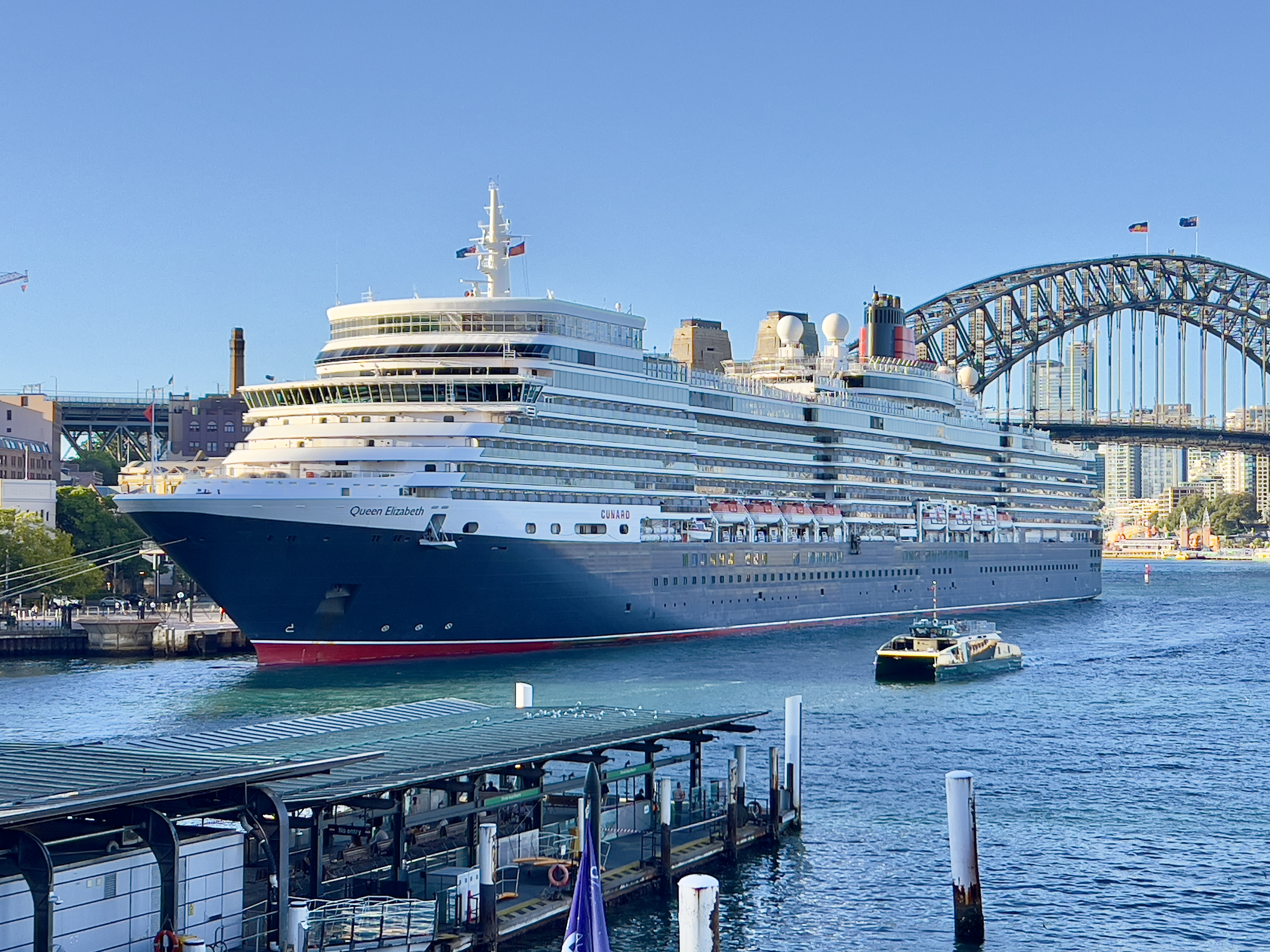
- Queen Elizabeth in Sydney, Australia in December 2022

History

Bermuda
- Name: Queen Elizabeth
- Namesake: RMS Queen Elizabeth
- Owner: Carnival Corporation
- Operator: Cunard
- Port of registry: (United Kingdom) Southampton (2010–2011); (Bermuda) Hamilton (2011–present)
- Route: Various
- Ordered: October 2007
- Builder: Fincantieri Monfalcone Shipyard, Italy
- Cost: £350 million (approx.) (US$560 million)
- Yard number: 6187
- Laid down: 2 July 2009
- Launched: 5 January 2010
- Christened: 11 October 2010
- Completed: October 2010
- Maiden voyage: 12 October 2010
- In service: 2010–present
- Identification: Call sign ZCEF2; IMO number: 9477438; MMSI number: 310625000
- Status: In service

General characteristics
- Class & type: Vista-class cruise ship
- Tonnage: 90,901 GT
- Length: 294 m (964 ft 7 in)
- Beam: 32.3 m (106 ft 0 in)
- Draught: 8 m (26 ft 3 in)
- Decks: 16 total; 12 accessible to passengers
- Installed power: 4 × MaK 12VM43C; 2 × MaK 8M43C; 64,000 kW (86,000 hp) (combined)
- Propulsion: Diesel-electric; Two ABB Azipods (2 × 17.6 MW); Three ABB bow thrusters (3 × 2,200 kW)
- Speed: 23.7 knots (43.9 km/h; 27.3 mph)
- Capacity: 2,092 passengers lower beds, 2,547 maximum passengers

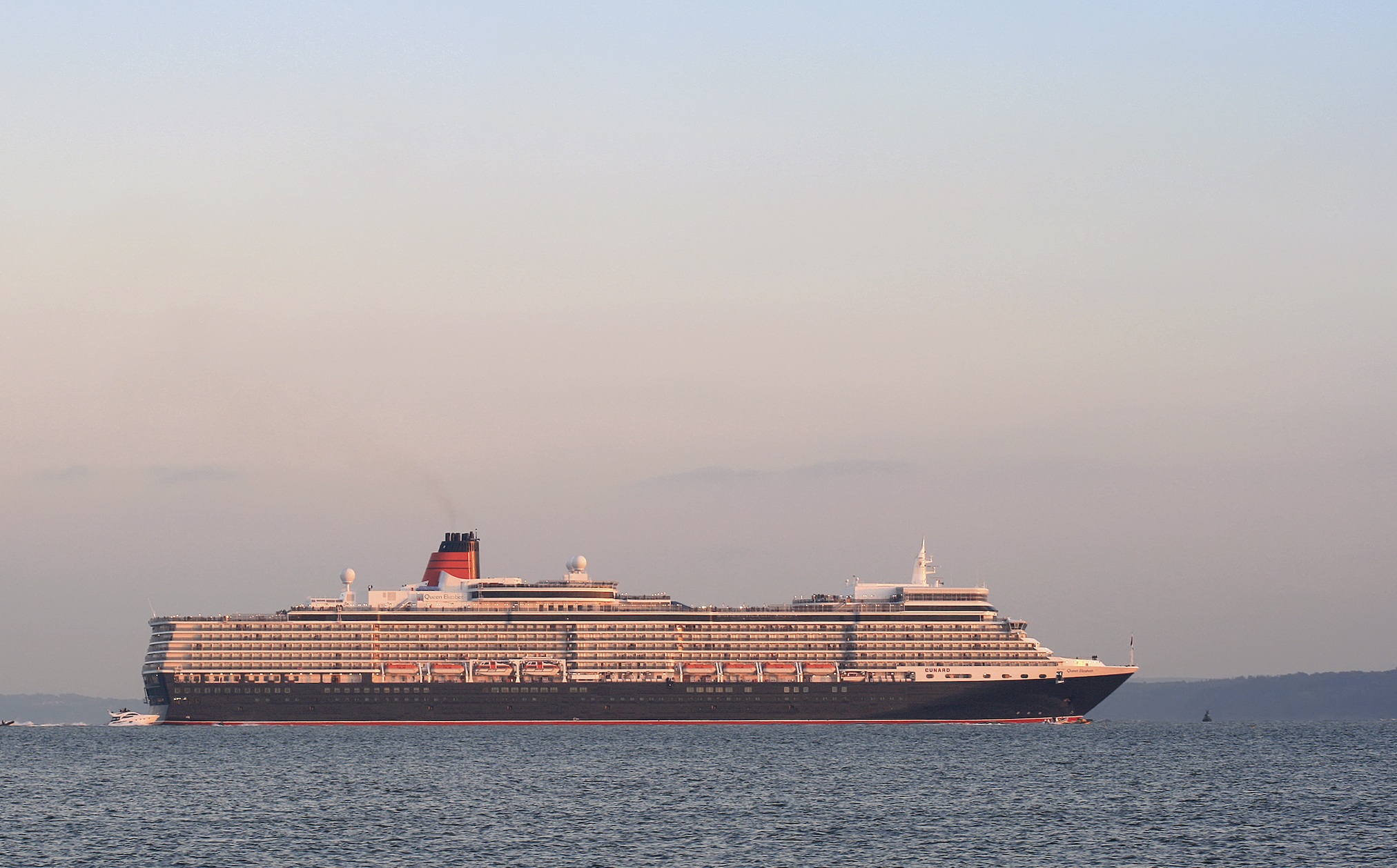
Queen Elizabeth outbound from Southampton on her maiden voyage, 2010

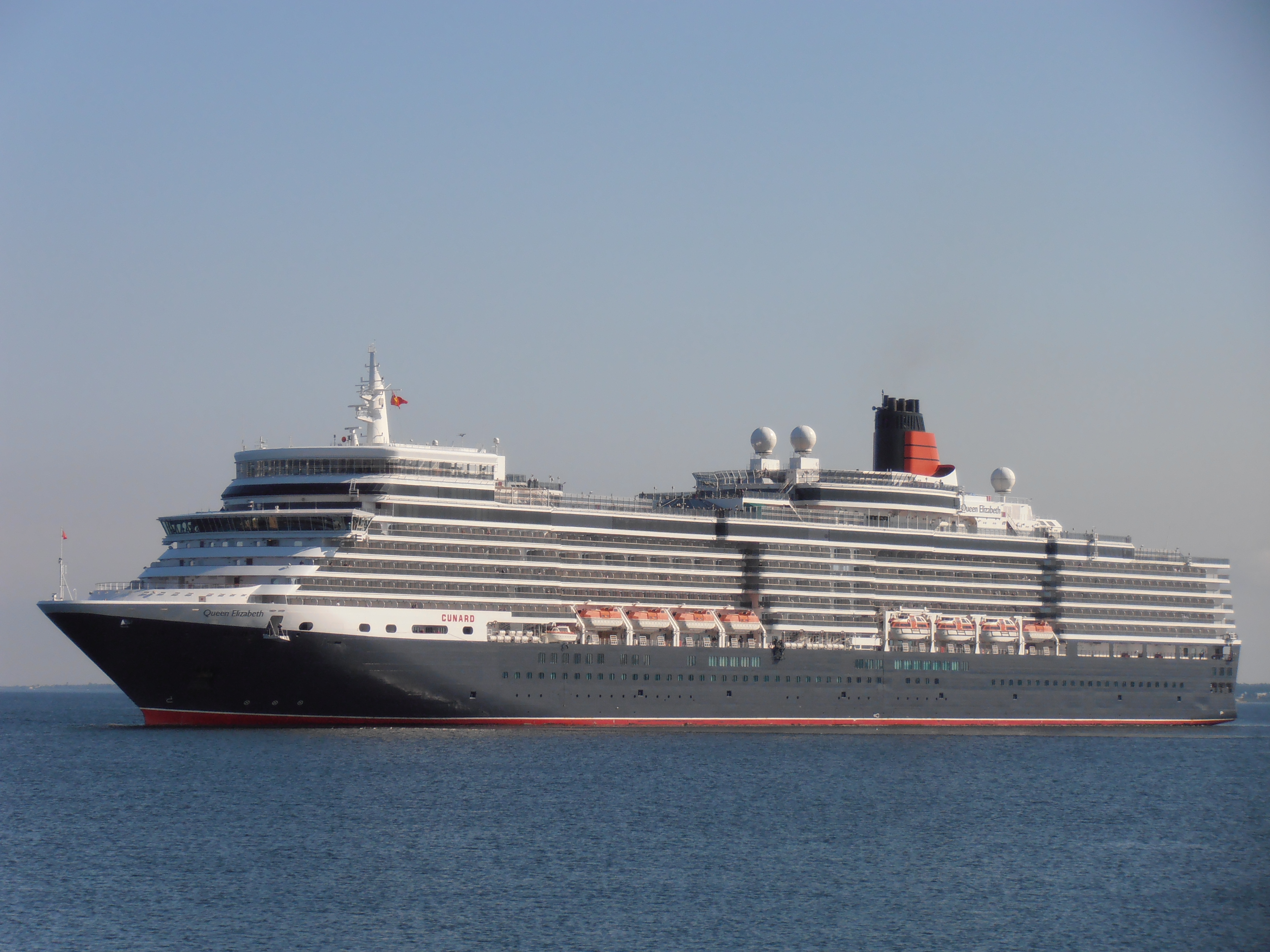
Queen Elizabeth in Tallinn, 2012

MS Queen Elizabeth is a cruise ship of the Vista class operated by the Cunard. The design is modified compared to earlier ships of the same class, and slightly larger than Queen Victoria, at 92,000 GT.

The ship's name was announced by Cunard on 10 October 2007. Since the retirement of Queen Elizabeth 2 in 2008 the company has operated four vessels. The naming of the ship as Queen Elizabeth brings about a situation similar to that between 1940 and 1948, when Cunard's original Queen Elizabeth was in service at the same time as the Royal Navy battleship HMS Queen Elizabeth. In July 2017 the MS Queen Elizabeth encountered the aircraft carrier HMS Queen Elizabeth at Invergordon when the latter returned to port to address a propulsion issue that occurred during her sea trials.

== Design ==
=== Exterior ===
Queen Elizabeth is similar in design to Queen Victoria; however, the steeper stern allowed a slightly higher passenger capacity of up to 2,058 compared to Queen Victoria's 2,014.

Also unlike many previous Cunard Queens, Queen Elizabeth is not a true ocean liner as she does not have the heavy plating throughout the hull. However, the bow was constructed with heavier plating to cope with the transatlantic run, and the ship has a high freeboard.

=== Interior ===
Although having an almost identical interior arrangement to Queen Victoria, the decor is very different. The ship is a tribute to the two previous Queen Elizabeth-named ships: the original Queen Elizabeth and Queen Elizabeth 2. She also evokes the era of the 1930s, in which Cunard's first Queen Elizabeth was launched, with many art deco interior touches. The ship also features a Britannia Club section of the main restaurant, which is a feature on Queen Mary 2, but not available on Queen Victoria. This service allows passengers in the Britannia staterooms to have single seating dining arrangements, without having to upgrade to the more expensive Grills classes. The sliding roof over the Winter Garden featured on Queen Victoria is replaced with a simple glass roof with the space being renamed the Garden Lounge.

== Launch ==
Following the ship's construction in Italy from 2007 to 2010, Cunard Line officially confirmed that Queen Elizabeth II would name Cunard's new ship. The ceremony was held in Southampton on 11 October 2010 before the ship set sail on her maiden voyage to the Canary Islands the following day. Queen Elizabeth II was also the sponsor of the retired Queen Elizabeth 2 in 1967 and Cunard's flagship, Queen Mary 2, in 2004.

== Service history ==
The first master of Queen Elizabeth was Captain Christopher Wells. On 4 October 2010 Queen Elizabeth was formally handed over to Cunard. She sailed on her maiden voyage from Southampton on 12 October 2010, following a naming ceremony with the monarch on 11 October 2010.

On 13 January 2011, two years after the first Cunard Royal Rendezvous, RMS Queen Mary 2 met up with Queen Victoria and the then brand new Queen Elizabeth for another Royal Rendezvous in New York City. Both Queen Victoria and Queen Elizabeth made an Atlantic crossing in tandem for the event. All three Cunarders met in front of the Statue of Liberty at 6:45 pm for a Grucci fireworks display. The Empire State Building was lit up in red to mark the event. At the end of October 2011 Queen Elizabeth and her fleet mates were registered to Hamilton, Bermuda, in order to host weddings aboard.

On 5 June 2012 all three 'Queens' met once more, but this time in Southampton in order to celebrate the Queen's Diamond Jubilee. On 29 June 2012, the ship made her one and only visit to Ny-Ålesund, in Svalbard. The previous scheduled visit in 2011 had to be aborted due to bad weather. However, she was not scheduled to visit Svalbard in her 2013 schedule. Legislation relating to cruise ships visiting the archipelago (applicable from 2014) meant that Queen Elizabeth will never be able to visit again. On 15 July 2012 both Queen Elizabeth and Queen Mary 2 visited Hamburg for the first time together.

On 12 March 2013 the cruise ship passed the former Cunard liner Queen Mary, then a hotel in Long Beach, California, for the first time along with fireworks display. On 31 August 2013, British journalist and broadcaster Sir David Frost died onboard of a heart attack. Frost had been invited to give a speech by Cunard whilst travelling on board the ship.

On 1 March 2014 Queen Elizabeth sailed into Sydney Harbour displaying a 126-metres long rainbow 'Happy Mardi Gras' banner from her top decks in tribute to the Sydney Gay and Lesbian Mardi Gras.

On 9 May 2014 both Queen Elizabeth and Queen Victoria led Queen Mary 2 up the Southampton channel in single file, with both ships docking in a bow to bow formation performing a birthday salute to Queen Mary 2. Later on, all three Cunarders gathered for a fireworks display during which Queen Mary 2 led both Queen Elizabeth and Queen Victoria back down the channel.

On 20 December 2014 Queen Elizabeth on a four night cruise was unable to dock in Amsterdam due to stormy conditions and was forced to circle in the English channel before returning to Southampton early.

In April 2015 while visiting Sihanoukville, Cambodia a passenger died on the Queen Elizabeth following an accident whilst boarding from a tender.

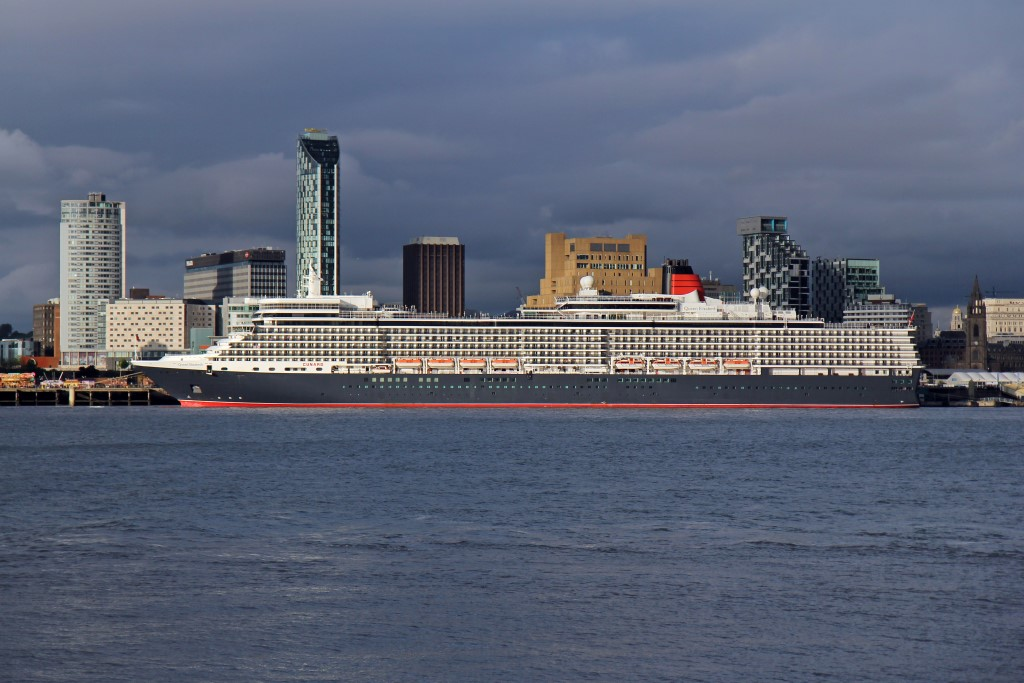
Queen Elizabeth at Liverpool Cruise Terminal, on 25 May 2015, after the Cunard 175 celebration

=== Three Queens: Cunard's 175th anniversary ===
On 25 May 2015 the three 'Queens' were positioned at Liverpool celebrating 175 years of the formation of the Cunard Line, which was formed and based in the city. At low tide, the three ships stopped in line in middle of the River Mersey, bow to stern, turned 180 degrees in full synchronisation with each other, which was known as the "river dance", they then formed an arrow side by side. Queen Mary 2 was in the centre with its bow in line with the Cunard Building at the Pier Head. The Royal Air Force's display team, the Red Arrows, performed a flypast in Vic formation, emitting red, white and blue smoke, over the vessels. An estimated 1.3 million people lined the river banks to witness the spectacle.

On 13 August 2016 Queen Elizabeth made the 2,500th cruise ship call at Kiel, Germany.

=== QE2 50th Anniversary Celebration ===
In September 2017 the ship hosted a special commemorative cruise to honour the 50th anniversary of its predecessor QE2. The Mediterranean cruise was chosen to pay tribute to QE2's role as a cruise ship. Special guests include Captain Ian McNaught, Commodore Ronald Warwick, Maritime Historian Chris Frame and QE2 Social Hostess Maureen Ryan.

=== 2019 refit ===
In January 2019 Queen Elizabeth underwent a two-week refit at the Damen Shiprepair Brest. Cabins, corridors, the spa and retail spaces were refurbished. Two cabins were removed to install an exhaust gas cleaning system (EGCS).

On 23 May 2019, Queen Elizabeth began regular service between Vancouver, British Columbia, Canada and various destinations in Alaska, United States.

=== Australia 2019 ===
Queen Elizabeth left Southampton in December 2019 for an extended cruise season in Australia.

On 24 February 2020 Queen Elizabeth was denied permission to dock in Rabaul by the Governor of East New Britain Province, Papua New Guinea due to their growing concerns regarding the COVID-19 pandemic.

On 28 February 2020 the Queen Elizabeth was the largest ship to ever dock at the Port of Cairns, Queensland, after shipping channel and wharf upgrades.

Australia banned cruise ships arriving from foreign ports from 15 March 2020, and on 27 March 2020 directed all foreign-flagged ships to leave the country. Queen Elizabeth was initially moored offshore near Newcastle, Australia, before departing for Manila Bay, Philippines, to anchor with a number of other cruise ships. On 18 May 2020 Typhoon Vongfong briefly forced to sea all the cruise ships anchored in Manila Bay.

On 26 July 2020 Queen Elizabeth departed Manila Bay and returned to the UK, where it was moored in Weymouth Bay with Queen Mary 2 and Queen Victoria, for the remainder of 2020 and the first half of 2021.

=== Resumption of cruising 2021 ===
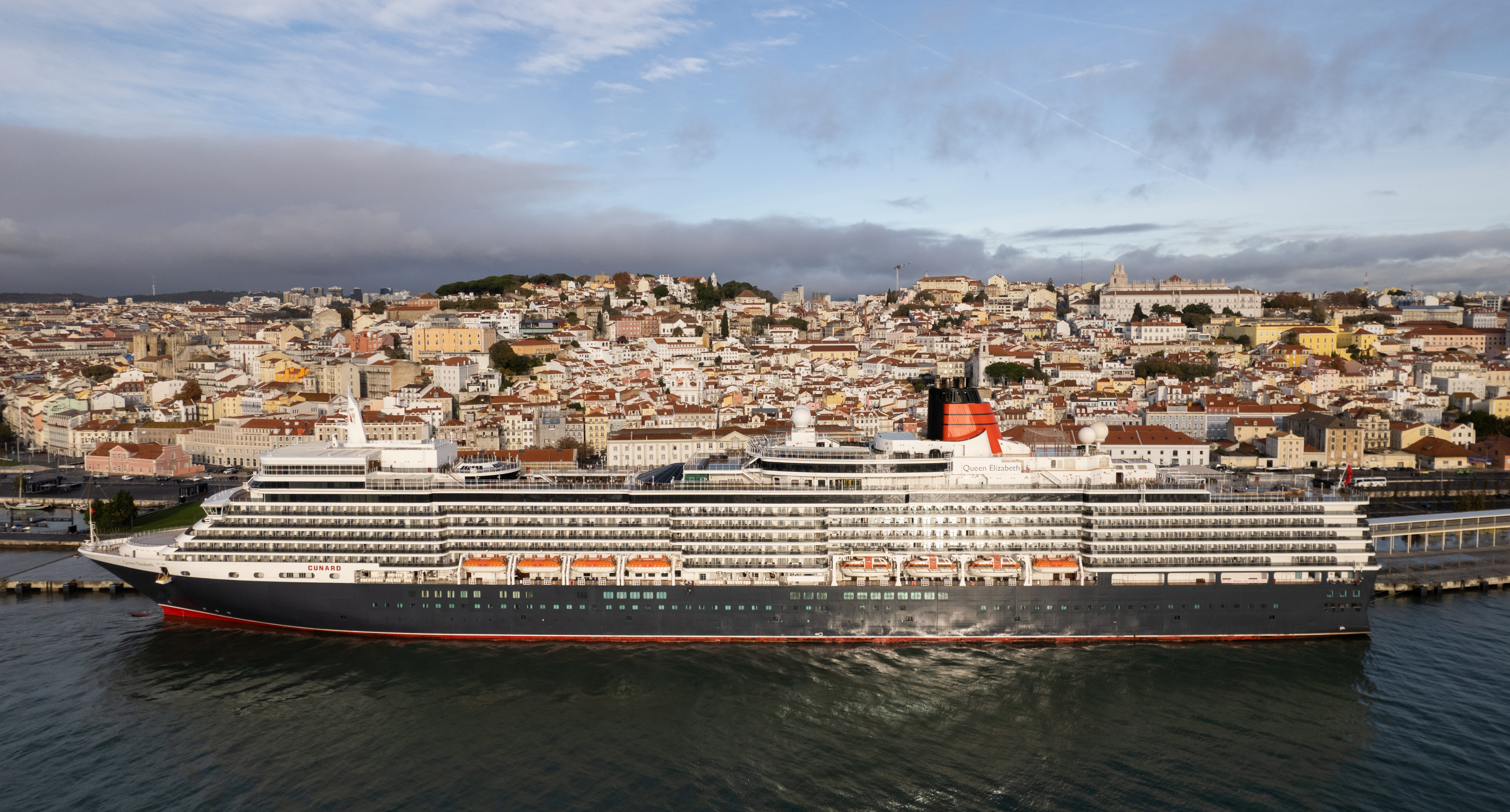
Queen Elizabeth in Lisbon, 2021

Resumption of cruising by Queen Elizabeth, scheduled for 19 July 2021, was delayed due to a small number of crew contracting COVID-19.

Queen Elizabeth finally returned to sailing on 13 August 2021 after a 17-month break.

On 28 November 2021 the Queen Elizabeth was unable to dock in Southampton due to the extreme weather of Storm Arwen causing the next voyage to be cancelled.

=== Alaska 2022 ===
In July 2021 large cruise ships returned to Alaska. However, Canada extended the ban on cruise ships until April 2022.

In May 2022 Queen Elizabeth returned to the North Pacific to start the Alaska cruise season.

National Oceanic and Atmospheric Administration (NOAA) recognised the contribution of the Queen Elizabeth for reporting 192 whale sightings in 2022 to their Whale Alert Alaska program.

In August the Queen Elizabeth returned to Europe for the 2022 autumn season.

=== Australia 2022 ===
Australia reopened for cruise ships on 17 April 2022 and on 31 July 2022, New Zealand's borders reopened for cruise ships.

Queen Elizabeth returned to Australia for an extended summer cruise season on 7 November 2022. On 27 November 2022, Queen Elizabeth was prevented from visiting Bali, Indonesia, due to some passengers testing positive for COVID-19, and was diverted to Fremantle but was then able to continue the scheduled cruise around Australia.

In January 2023, the Queen Elizabeth was forced to skip visits to Fiordland, including Milford Sound, and Dunedin in New Zealand due to biofouling concerns. On 15 January 2023, adverse weather offshore from Tauranga prevented safe hull cleaning and the ship was prevented from visiting the Bay of Islands.

In February 2023, after extensive consultation with New Zealand authorities, it was stipulated that additional work was required in advance of visiting any New Zealand destinations, which was not possible. The planned cruise to New Zealand was replaced with visits to Australian ports. Having completed the Australian cruise season the Queen Elizabeth sailed for Singapore via Bali and Jakarta. On 16 March 2023, the Queen Elizabeth entered Sembcorp Marine's drydock for scheduled maintenance in preparation for the North Pacific summer cruise season.

=== Japan 2023 ===
On 15 November 2022, Japan announced it would be reopening for cruise ship visits. On 3 April 2023, the Queen Elizabeth left Singapore on a repositioning cruise to Japan via Vietnam, Philippines and Taiwan.

The Queen Elizabeth was based in Japan for the spring cruise season. This coincided with the 100th anniversary year of the visit of the RMS Laconia to Japan on the first continuous circumnavigation of the world by a passenger liner in 1923, the first world cruise.

To celebrate the Coronation of King Charles III on 6 May 2023, the Queen Elizabeth channeled the ceremony live from Westminster Abbey into the ship's Royal Court Theatres and stateroom TVs. There was also a special Coronation dinner menu, cocktails and events.

=== Alaska 2023 ===
In May 2023 the Queen Elizabeth sailed to Alaska for the summer. Queen Elizabeth is one of a handful of cruise ships permitted to sail in the UNESCO-listed Glacier Bay National Park. US National Park Service park rangers on board the ship provided special presentations about the park. Former SAS member turned TV adventurer Bear Grylls also provide motivational presentations.

The Queen Elizabeth crossed the Atlantic in September 2023 to spend the autumn in the Mediterranean before transiting the Suez Canal and heading for Australia for the 2023/2024 Christmas season in the southern hemisphere summer, Japan for spring 2024 and back to Alaska in early summer 2024.

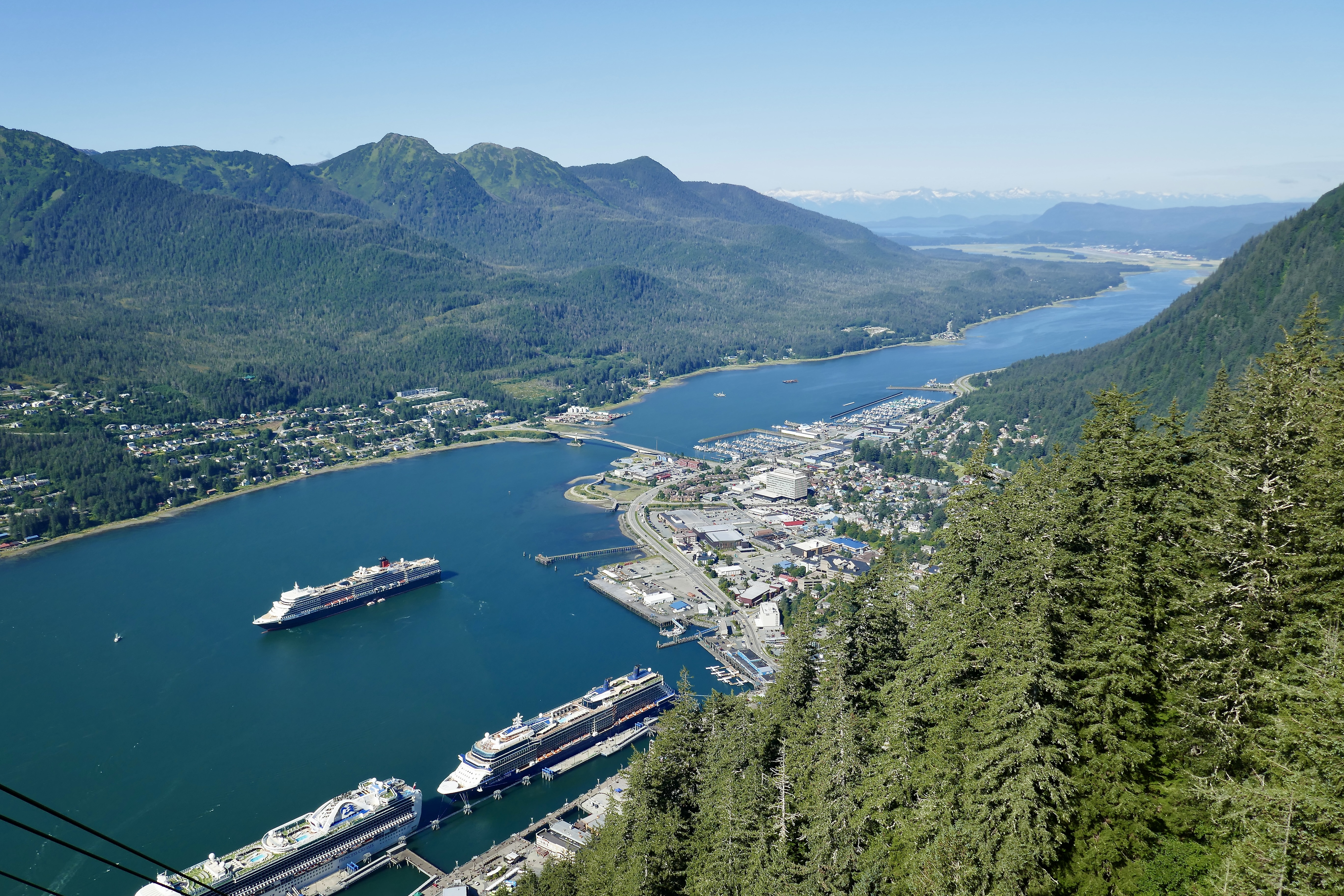
Queen Elizabeth in Juneau, Alaska with Crown Princess & Celebrity Solstice on 15 August 2024

=== HMNZS Manawanui ===
In October 2024, along with the Norwegian vessel Lodbrog, the Queen Elizabeth responded to the mayday and eventual sinking of the Royal New Zealand Navy ship HMNZS Manawanui off the coast of Samoa.

== Notable passengers ==
Jimmy Savile, English DJ and TV presenter, who was present at the October 2010 Christening, had gone on a cruise on the Queen Elizabeth for its maiden voyage around Britain in September 2011. Savile had been taken ill and was forced to leave the ship in Liverpool. He was admitted to hospital where he was diagnosed with pneumonia and four of his major organs were failing. He died of cardiac arrest, heart failure, ischaemic disease and renal failure the following month. A planned tribute to Savile was cancelled in October 2012 when he was posthumously exposed as a predatory sex offender.
