= Indigo (submarine cable system) =

Indigo Central
- Cable type: Fibre-optic
- Construction beginning: 2018
- Construction finished: 2019
- First traffic: August 2019
- Built by: Alcatel Submarine Networks
- Landing points: Perth, Australia; Sydney, Australia
- Owner(s): Indigo Consortium

Indigo West
- Cable type: Fibre-optic
- Construction beginning: 2018
- Construction finished: 2019
- First traffic: August 2019
- Built by: Alcatel Submarine Networks
- Landing points: Perth, Australia; Jakarta, Indonesia; Changi, Singapore
- Owner(s): Indigo Consortium

The Indigo submarine cable system is a 9,200 km fibre-optic submarine communications cable that first entered service in June 2019.

The system comprises two related but distinct cable projects:

- Indigo West, a 4,725km cable linking Australia and Singapore via Indonesia, and
- Indigo Central, a 4,675km cable linking Perth and Sydney.

Each cable consists of two fibre pairs and had an initial design capacity of 36 terabits per second. Owned by the Indigo Consortium, the system uses an 'open cable' design with spectrum sharing technology, providing consortium members with spectrum ownership and the ability to independently perform upgrades and technology enhancements.

== History ==
The project was conceived in 2013 under the name Asia-Pacific Express (APX). Three cables, APX-East, APX-Central and APX-West, were to be built, owned and operated by SubPartners, a company founded by Bevan Slattery. Designed with four fibre pairs and a capacity of 32 Tbit/s, APX-West would connect Perth to Singapore, with branching units for future connections to Christmas Island and Jakarta. APX-Central would connect Perth to Sydney, with branching units for future connections to Adelaide, Melbourne and Hobart. A memorandum of understanding was signed between Telstra and SubPartners for capacity on the APX-West segment, and an early manufacturing agreement was signed between SubPartners and TE SubCom for the reservation of 3,300km of cable.

SubPartners struggled to obtain funding for the project, and in March 2016 a memorandum of understanding was signed between Singtel, Telstra, and SubPartners that would convert the ownership of APX-West to a consortium arrangement. The design was revised to two fibre pairs and 20 Tbit/s of capacity, with construction expected to commence in July 2016 and forecast to complete in 2018.

In April 2017, SubPartners was acquired by Superloop, an Australian fibre infrastructure company which had been founded by Slattery in 2014, for A$2.5 million. AARNet, Google and Indosat joined the consortium, with the project being renamed to Indigo and revised to include construction of the former APX-Central segment between Perth and Sydney through the Great Australian Bight. Alcatel Submarine Networks was announced as the builder of the cable, with capacity being increased to 36 Tbit/s and the completion date being revised to mid-2019.

Construction began in 2018. In September, laying of the first segment for Indigo West between Perth and Christmas Island was completed. In November, Indigo Central landed in Sydney at Coogee Beach, and NEXTDC was selected to provide the cable landing facilities in Perth and Sydney.

In February 2019, Telstra announced that final splicing had been completed and that commissioning had commenced. In August, Superloop announced that both Indigo Central and Indigo West had gone live.

In November 2020, Ciena and SUBCO announced that it had upgraded the cable to support 500 Gbps wavelengths.

In February 2023, SUBCO announced it had acquired additional spectrum on Indigo West, and an option to acquire further spectrum on Indigo Central.

In January 2026, SUBCO announced it had acquired a additional quarter fibre pair on Indigo Central, providing more than 13 Tbit/s of contiguous capacity and making it the equal largest owner of capacity on Indigo Central.

== Ownership ==
The Indigo Consortium consists of:

- AARNet
- Google
- Indosat
- Singtel
- Superloop
- Telstra

Other companies may also own capacity under a lease or an Indefeasible rights of use arrangement.

== Service Disruptions ==
On 3 December 2025, a fault was identified on Indigo West that resulted in an outage to services on the cable. The fault was located approximately 725km from Singapore, in Indonesian waters. During repair works in January 2026, two additional faults were identified. Repairs were completed in February 2026.

On 7 August 2026, both Indigo Central and Indigo West went offline. Shunt faults on both cables occurred at around the same time, with both faults being detected in segments of cable that lay within the Perth Submarine Cable Protection Zone. A social media post by Bevan Slattery, CEO of SUBCO, on LinkedIn showed the AIS track of an Oil tanker, owned by Gulf Energy Maritime and known as GEM Sapphire, which was in the area and appeared to make repeated erratic crossings over the Cable Protection Zone around the time of the faults. The incident was subsequently referred to the Australian Federal Police for investigation. On the 16th September, repairs to the Perth fault were completed, however traffic failed to restore after power control was handed back to the cable landing station. On the 18th September, Vocus Communications, operator of the competing Australia Singapore Cable which was also offline due to a cable cut, announced that while the ASC fault had priority for repair over the Indigo West fault, Vocus had agreed to sequence the repair of Indigo West ahead of ASC to provide a quicker restoration of service between Singapore and Australia since the affected section of ASC would need to be powered down for repairs. Vocus also estimated that the repair of Indigo West would be completed on 24 October.

== Landing points ==
=== Indigo Central ===
1. Floreat Beach, Perth, Western Australia, Australia
2. Coogee Beach, Sydney, New South Wales, Australia

=== Indigo West ===
1. Floreat Beach, Perth, Western Australia, Australia
2. Jakarta, Indonesia
3. Changi, Singapore

== See also ==
- List of international submarine communications cables
