= Alaska United =

American submarine fiber-optic cable

Alaska United Fiber Optic Cable System (abbreviated AUFS or AU) is a submarine fiber-optic cable owned by GCI that links Anchorage, several places in Southeast Alaska including Juneau, to Oregon and Washington State. Alaska United East (AU-East) is 3,751 kilometers long with landing points at Anchorage and Lena Point in Juneau, and at the shore of Puget Sound at Norma Beach near Picnic Point in Lynnwood, Washington; AU-West has landings at Seward and on the Pacific coast at Warrenton, Oregon. Both are OC-192 rated (10 G bit/s) as of 2018. Additional overland segments (AU-North/NW) connect Anchorage to Fairbanks and Prudhoe Bay along the Alaska Pipeline corridor and Parks Highway.

Laying cable for the first segment, AU-East from Anchorage to Lynnwood, was accomplished in the second half of 1999. AU-East's initial cost was $120 million and it was one of two 1999 projects bringing high-speed communications including Internet access to Alaska, supplanting the 45 Mbit/s North Pacific Cable (NPC) Alaska Spur. NPC was shut down in 2004.

Alaska Communications depends on fiber connectivity to provide service.

A January 2013 earthquake broke the cable near Wrangell. The cable ship Wave Venture was sent to locate the cable with an ROV and effect repairs.
