= Siumu =

Village on Upolu island

Coordinates: 14.008°S 171.779°W

Si’umu is a village on the central south coast of Upolu island in Samoa. The population is 1183. There is also a sub-village Siumu Uta which has a population of 304.

== Siumu Electoral Constituency ==
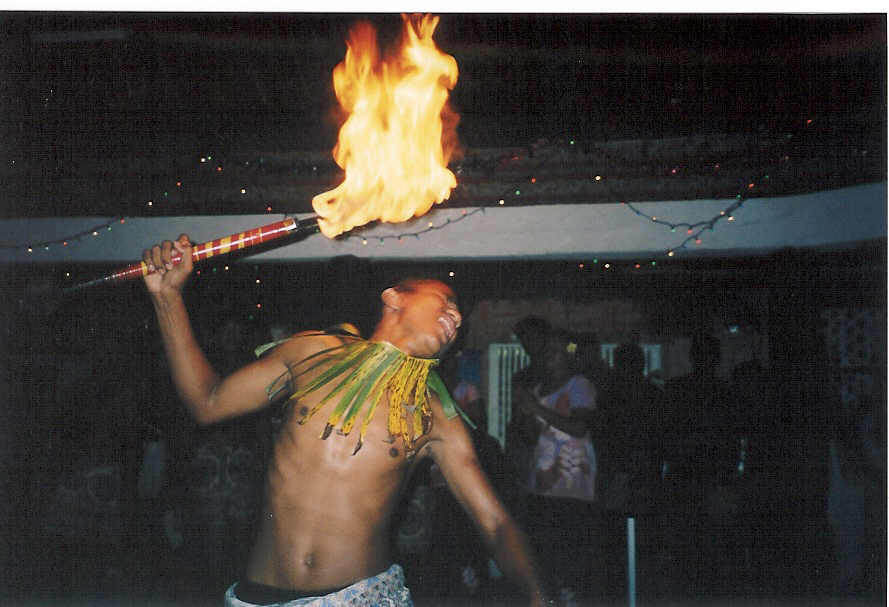
Samoan fire dancer siva afi

Siumu Electoral Constituency (Faipule District) comprise the villages of Siumu, Siumu Uta, Maninoa and Saaga. The constituency has a total population of 2,349 and is part of the larger political district Tuamasaga.

== History ==
Known for its fire dancers, a 5-year-old girl from the village demonstrating a siva afi (or fire stick dance) was one of the principal performers at the opening ceremony to the 2007 Pacific Games at Apia Park.

On 5 October 2024 the Royal New Zealand Navy ship HMNZS Manawanui ran aground and sunk off the coast of Siumu while surveying a nearby reef during a storm. The sinking of the Manawanui has polluted the surrounding sea and disrupted the livelihoods of local Samoan villagers, who were unable to fish. The Samoan and New Zealand authorities were criticised by local villagers for a lack of compensation and engagement with local communities. This led local villagers to seek financial assistance from the Chinese Embassy in Apia.

On 12 February 2025 the Samoan Government lifted a "precautionary zone" around the wreckage of HMNZS Manawanui following testing by the Scientific Research Organisation of Samoa (SROS). However, a two km prohibition zone around the sunken ship remained in force.
