= NPC (cable system) =

Submarine telecommunications cable system in the North Pacific Ocean

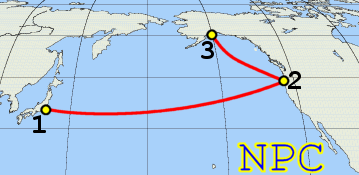

NPC (North Pacific Cable) is a submarine telecommunications cable system in the North Pacific Ocean linking the United States and Japan.

It has landing points in:

1. Miura, Kanagawa Prefecture, Japan
2. Pacific City, Tillamook County, Oregon, United States
3. Seward, Kenai Peninsula Borough, Alaska, United States (branch @ 420 Mbit/s)

It has a transmission capacity of 1,260 Mbit/s, and a total cable length of 5,200 miles (~8,400 km). The cable also included a spur to Alaska. The cable started operation in May 1991 and ceased operating in 2004.
