= NextDC =

Australian data centre operator

NEXTDC
- Type: Public
- Traded as: ASX: NXT; S&P/ASX 200 component
- Founded: 2010
- Headquarters: Brisbane, Queensland
- Key people: Craig Scroggie (CEO)
- Website: nextdc.com

NextDC is an Australian data centre operator headquartered in Brisbane, Queensland. It is the largest listed developer and operator of such facilities in the country. As of March 2026, the company operates 17 data centres in Australia and one in Malaysia.

== History ==
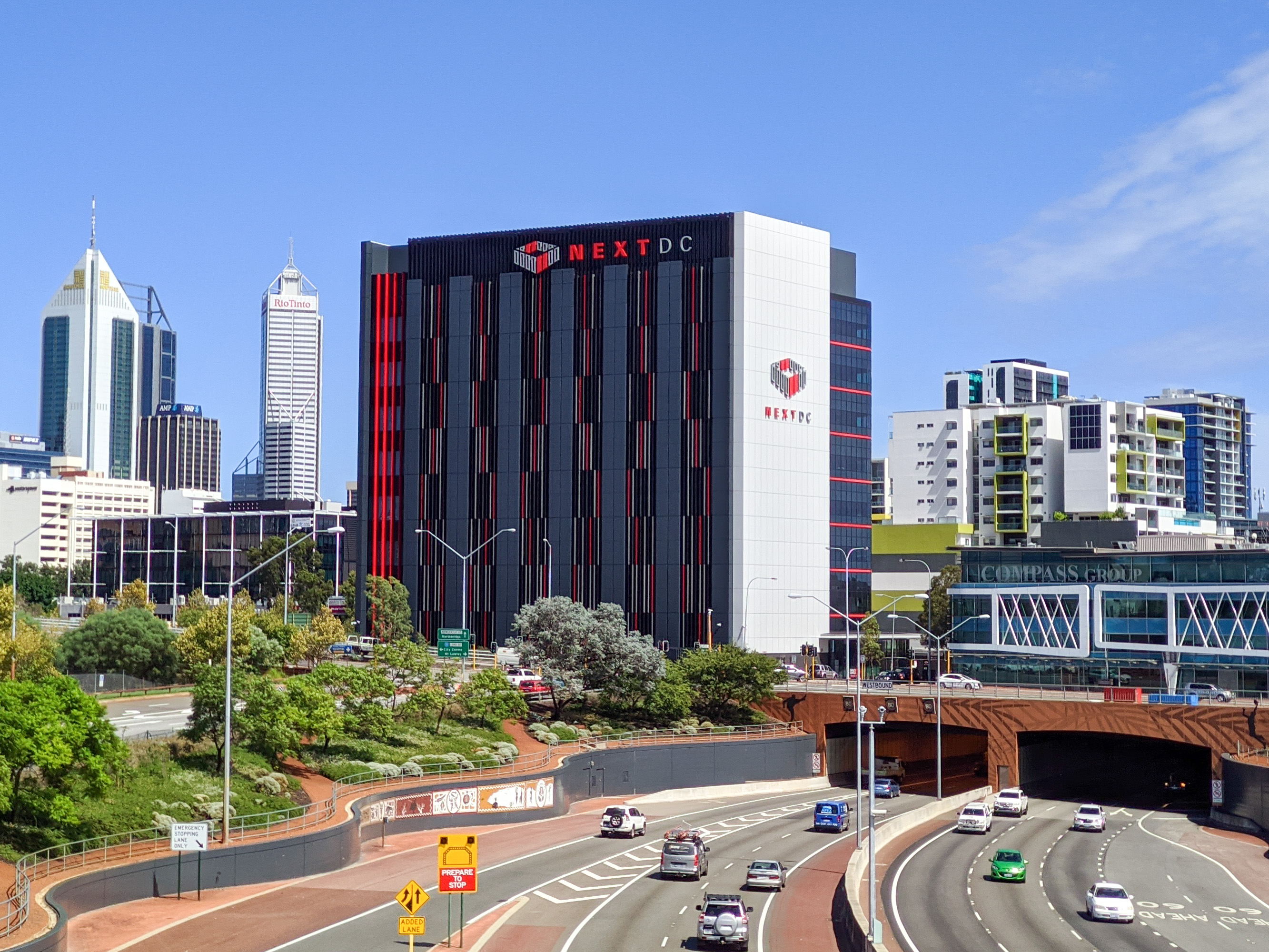
NextDC's P2 data centre in Perth

NextDC was founded by Bevan Slattery in May 2010. It has been listed on the Australian Securities Exchange since December 2010.

In 2015, NextDC was named Australia's fastest-growing technology company in the Deloitte Technology Fast 50 awards.

In December 2025, NextDC signed a memorandum of understanding with OpenAI to develop sovereign artificial intelligence infrastructure in Australia, with a large AI campus and GPU supercluster at the company's S7 site in Sydney.

In May 2026, NextDC launched its first international data centre, KL1 Kuala Lumpur.

== Data centres ==
Operational
Name	Location	Launched date	Uptime Institute tier	Ref
KL1 Kuala Lumpur	Kuala Lumpur, Malaysia	2026	IV	
A1 Adelaide	Adelaide, South Australia	2024	IV	
B1 Brisbane	Brisbane, Queensland	2011	III	
B2 Brisbane	Fortitude Valley, Queensland	2017	IV	
C1 Canberra	Canberra, Australian Capital Territory	2012	III	
D1 Darwin	Darwin, Northern Territory	2024	III	
M1 Melbourne	Port Melbourne, Victoria	2012	III	
M2 Melbourne	Tullamarine, Victoria	2017	IV	
M3 Melbourne	West Footscray, Victoria	2022	IV	
P1 Perth	Malaga, Western Australia	2014	III	
P2 Perth	Perth, Western Australia	2020	IV	
PH1 Port Hedland	Port Hedland, Western Australia	2023	III	
S1 Sydney	Macquarie Park, New South Wales	2013	III	
S2 Sydney	Macquarie Park, New South Wales	2020	IV	
S3 Sydney	Artarmon, New South Wales	2022	IV	
S6 Sydney	Artarmon, New South Wales	2024	N/A	
SC1 Sunshine Coast	Maroochydore, Queensland	2021	N/A (Edge data centre)	
NE1 Newman	Newman, Western Australia	2024	III	

Under construction or in development
Name	Location	Status	Ref
M4 Melbourne	Port Melbourne, Victoria	In development	
S4 Sydney	Horsley Park, New South Wales	In development	
S5 Sydney	Macquarie Park, New South Wales	In planning	
AK1 Auckland	Auckland, New Zealand	In planning	
TK1 Tokyo	Tokyo, Japan	In development	
GE1 Geelong	Geelong, Victoria	In development	
S7 Sydney	Eastern Creek, New South Wales	In planning	
GC1 Gold Coast	Gold Coast, Queensland	In planning	
SC2 Sunshine Coast	Sunshine Coast, Queensland	In development	
D2 Darwin	Darwin, Northern Territory	In development	
