= Superloop (company) =

Australian telecommunications company

Superloop Limited
- Type: Public
- Traded as: ASX: SLC
- Industry: Telecommunications
- Founded: 2014
- Founder: Bevan Slattery
- Key people: Paul Tyler (CEO)
- Subsidiaries: Exetel
- Website: superloop.com

Superloop is an Australian telecommunications company and internet service provider. It was founded in 2014 by Bevan Slattery.

== History ==
Superloop was founded by Bevan Slattery in 2014 when Slattery spun off the dark fibre infrastructure assets from his Megaport business. Superloop was listed on the Australian Securities Exchange (ASX) in June 2015. In October 2015, Superloop acquired Apex Networks for $5.8 million followed by Cinenet Systems for $3 million in November. In September 2016, Superloop acquired BigAir.

In April 2017, Superloop acquired SubPartners, which developed international submarine communications cable systems and had also been previously founded by Slattery, for A$2.5 million. The acquisition of SubPartners provided Superloop with assets that included a stake in the Indigo Consortium, which was building the Indigo cable system between Singapore, Jakarta, Perth and Sydney. Indigo Central and Indigo West went live in August 2019.

In June 2021 Superloop acquired Internet service provider Exetel for $110 million in cash and shares. In October Superloop announced it would sell its Hong Kong subsidiary and certain assets in Singapore to Columbia Capital and DigitalBridge Investment Management for $140 million. The sale was completed in April 2022.

In May 2022 Superloop acquired white label business Acurus for $15 million. In September that year, Superloop acquired VostroNet for $35 million in cash and shares. After MyRepublic decided to exit the Australian market in December 2022, customers were migrated to Superloop. In August 2023, Superloop announced its intention to acquire Symbio but it was eventually outbid by Aussie Broadband.

In February 2026, Superloop announced it would acquire fibre-to-the-premise (FTTP) network wholesaler Lynham Networks for $165 million in cash. The acquisition also included Lynham's retail service provider Lightning Broadband. In June 2026, the company launched its Neoloop wholesale FTTP brand. unifying offerings from its Vostronet, Frontier Networks and Lightning Broadband acquisitions.

== Recognition ==
In August 2025, Superloop was recognised by Ookla as Australia’s “Fastest Fixed Network (H1 2025)” based on more than 18 million consumer-initiated Speedtest results between January and June 2025.
