= TEFKROS =

TEFKROS is a domestic submarine telecommunications cable system in the Mediterranean Sea along the coast of Cyprus.

It has landing points in:

- Pentaskhinos
- Ayia Napa (Greek: Αγία Νάπα), Famagusta District (Greek:Επαρχία Αμμόχωστου)

It has a design transmission capacity of 4 x 2.5 Gbit/s and a total cable length of 82 km. It started operation in 1994.

== Sources ==
- "Technical Information". Archived from the original on 2011-06-08.
