= KINYRAS =

Submarine telecommunications cable system in Cyprus

KINYRAS is a domestic submarine telecommunications cable system in the Mediterranean Sea along the coast of Cyprus.

It has landing points in:

- Geroskipou/Yeroskipos (Greek: Γεροσκήπου), Paphos District (Greek:Επαρχία Πάφου)
- Pentaskhios

It has a design transmission capacity of 6 x 2.5 Gbit/s and a total cable length of 140 km. It started operation in 1994.
