= Bevan Slattery =

Australian technology entrepreneur

- Born: Bevan Andrew Slattery
- Education: North Rockhampton State High School
- Alma mater: Central Queensland University
- Occupation: Technology entrepreneur
- Known for: NextDC, SUB.CO, Cloudscene, Superloop, Megaport, Co-Founder PIPE Networks, HyperOne

Bevan Andrew Slattery is an Australian technology entrepreneur who has built a number of businesses that handles data and telecommunications.

== Early life ==
Slattery grew up in Rockhampton, Queensland, where he attended Frenchville State School. He graduated from North Rockhampton State High School in 1988, then attended Central Queensland University, which later awarded him an honorary MBA. He worked as a trainee local government clerk for Rockhampton City Council.

== Career ==
In 1998, Slattery co-founded iSeek, a cloud, data centre and connectivity provider that was sold to US firm N2H2 for US$16 million in 2000. In 2001, with Steve Baxter, Slattery co-founded telecommunications infrastructure provider PIPE Networks; and the company was sold to TPG in 2010 for A$373 million. The same year, Slattery founded NextDC, a data centre provider.

In 2012 Slattery founded the AsiaPacific Data Centre, a data centre real estate trust; and also SubPartners, a submarine cable group. The following year Slattery co-founded Biopixel, a filming company specialising in natural history behavioural sequences for both clients and its own specialist library; and in the same year he founded Megaport, a technology networking business that offers scalable bandwidth for public and private cloud connections, metro Ethernet, and Data Centre backhaul as well as Internet Exchange Services.

In 2014 Slattery founded Superloop, a fibre network infrastructure provider for the Asia Pacific region with networks in Singapore and Australia. He floated Superloop the following year. In 2022, Slattery sold the last of his shares in Superloop.

In 2015 Slattery founded Cloudscene, the world's largest directory of colocation data centres, cloud service providers, and interconnected fabrics.

Slattery was inducted into the CommsDay Hall of Fame in 2017 for his major contribution to the development of Australia's telecommunications industry.

== Personal life ==
In 2011, Slattery was listed on BRW's list of the 100 wealthiest Australians under 40 years, with a net worth of A$103 million. Slattery made his debut appearance on the Financial Review 2020 Rich List with a net worth of A$564 million. In 2022, Slattery was ranked at #69 on The Courier-Mail's list of Queensland's most powerful people.
