= Alcatel Submarine Networks =

French telecommunications company

- Type: Simplified joint stock company
- Industry: Telecommunications
- Founded: 1858
- Headquarters: 1 avenue du Canada, Les Ulis, Paris-Saclay, France
- Key people: Alain Biston (CEO)
- Services: Manufacture, deployment and maintenance of submarine cable networks
- Revenue: 692,000,000 euro (2020)
- Net income: −89,100,000 euro (2020)
- Owner: Agence des participations de l'État (80%); Nokia (20%)
- Number of employees: 2,000
- Website: asn.com

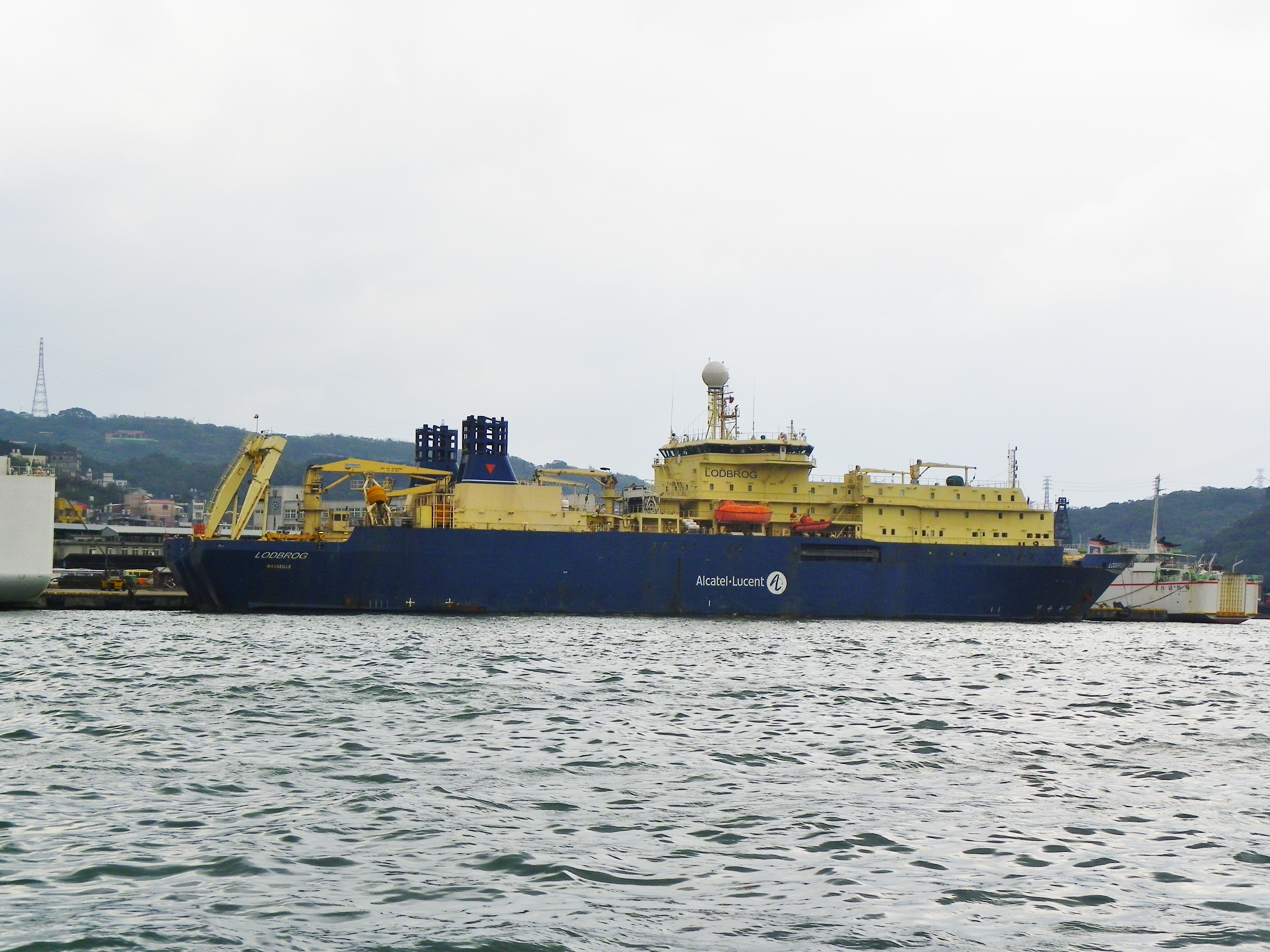
Lodbrog in 2013

Alcatel Submarine Networks (ASN) is a French company and one of the three world leaders in the manufacture and installation of submarine cables (alongside NEC and SubCom). It is majority-owned by the French government.

Alcatel Submarine Networks originated from various earlier firms, including the Submarine Telegraph Company and the Compagnie Générale d'Électricité. Following a series of reorganisations and acquisitions during the early 1990s, Alcatel Submarine Networks emerged as a subsidiary of the French telecoms specialist Alcatel. In 2000, it formed a long-running joint venture with Louis Dreyfus Armatuers (LDA) to build, own and operate a fleet of cable ships. During 2006, Alcatel Submarine Networks was rebranded as Alcatel-Lucent Submarine Networks after Alcatel became Alcatel-Lucent. Alcatel-Lucent Submarine Networks was acquired by the Finnish group Nokia in 2016, and was owned by Nokia France between 2016 and 2024. The French state acquired 80% of the company's capital in November 2024.

Alcatel Submarine Networks designs, manufactures, lays and maintains telecommunications submarine cables and related equipment, using its own vessels to carry optical fibre around the globe. Laying telecommunications submarine cables is a strategic industry. ASN, Subcom and NEC dominate this global market, with 99% of Internet traffic passing through these cables, 80% of which transits through the United States, whatever its destination. In 2018, ASN's market share (30%) was ahead of Japanese competitor NEC (23%) and American Subcom (20%). By 2020, ASN had laid 600,000 kilometers of cables. As of 2024, ASN has 2,000 employees, including 1,370 in France. The company has several sites in France, the United Kingdom and Norway. Alcatel Submarine Networks has a fleet of seven cable-laying vessels and is the world No. 1 in the sector.

== History ==
Alcatel Submarine Networks can trace its origins back to the British Submarine Telegraph Company, founded in 1851 with the involvement of the engineer Thomas Crampton, which in the same year laid the first telegraph cable between England and France. The company went on to lay other cables connecting England and Jersey to the continent until it was taken over by the General Post Office in 1890.

In 1925, the Compagnie Générale d'Électricité absorbed the Compagnie Générale des Cables de Lyon. In 1991, Compagnie Générale d'Électricité changed its name to Alcatel-Alsthom; subsequently, Compagnie Générale des Câbles de Lyon became Alcatel Câble and acquired AEG Kabel in exchange for $586 million,

In 1993, Alcatel Cable acquired the British company STC Submarine Systems (the successor company to the Submarine Telegraph Company) and its 34,000 m2 factory at Enderby's Wharf on the Greenwich Peninsula on the banks of the Thames, where submarine cables had been made since 1857. The company had latterly been a division of Northern Telecom Europe (which later became Nortel). Alcatel Cable became the world's leading cable manufacturer, with around 40% of the global market for fibre-optic submarine telecommunications cables. At the time of the acquisition, its production capacity was roughly 30,000 km of optical cable per year.

In June 1994, Alcatel merged its submarine telecommunications activities into a new company called Alcatel Submarine Systems; this subsidiary was 51% owned by Alcatel Câble (which became Nexans) while 49% was held by Alcatel-CIT. On 9 October 2000, Alcatel Cable became Nexans; Alcatel retained Alcatel Submarine Networks and 20% of Nexans (this stake in Nexans was resold in 2005).

In 2000, Alcatel Submarine Networks and Louis Dreyfus Armatuers (LDA) formed a partnership called ALDA Marine. This joint venture focused on the building, owning and operation of a fleet of cable ships to provide subsea telecommunication cable systems and marine operations in the global market.

During 2003, Alcatel was part of the consortium to build the Sudan to South Africa undersea cable link called Eastern Africa Submarine System (EASSy). Following the completion of EASSy, Alcatel has remained involved in the operation of the cable as well as the expansion of its capacity.

In June 2003, one of Alcatel Submarine Networks' vessels, Heimdal, performed a record-breaking repair of submarine optical fiber in the Pacific Ocean, on the route between Japan and the United States, at an extreme depth of almost 9,400 km.

On 1 December 2006, Alcatel acquired Lucent Technologies to form Alcatel-Lucent; consequently, Alcatel Submarine Networks was rebranded as Alcatel-Lucent Submarine Networks.

On 8 April 2009, Alcatel-Lucent Submarine Networks signed a supply contract with a telecoms consortium for the construction and maintenance of the West Africa Cable System (WACS), a cable linking South Africa and the United Kingdom via the Atlantic Ocean. On 15 July 2010, Alcatel-Lucent Submarine Networks began laying the WACS cable with the departure of Île de Bréhat from the cable factory in Calais, loaded with nearly 6,000 km of submarine cable. The cable was laid by Île de Bréhat and its sister ship Île de Sein, installation work officially ended on 19 April 2011 with the laying of the cable in Yzerfontein and the cable was declared operational on 11 May 2012 when it was illuminated in South Africa.

In mid 2011, Alcatel Submarine Networks made use of its cable ships in an unconventional manner when the CS Ile de Sein contributed to the recovery of the flight data recorder along with the bodies of numerous victims from Air France Flight 447 in the Atlantic. This action proved that the company has the versatility to use the vessel to recover an object from the seabed for telecommunications or emergency assistance purposes.

In October 2014, Alcatel-Lucent Submarine Networks acquired the Norwegian company Optoplan, which was formerly a division of the French oil group CGG.

In 2015, Alcatel-Lucent renewed their partnership with Louis Dreyfus Armateurs (LDA). Furthermore, Alcatel-Lucent took ownership of all seven ships in the fleet, which would be operated by LDA.

On 15 April 2015, Alcatel-Lucent announced its acquisition by the Finnish telecoms giant Nokia. While Alcatel-Lucent Submarine Networks would become part of Nokia's Submarine Network Solutions division in France, but was intended to remain operationally independent. In 2017, Alcatel-Lucent Submarine Networks reverted to its original name, Alcatel Submarine Networks.

In October 2018, Nokia and the French telecoms provider Ekinops confirmed that they had been in discussions for several months about a possible takeover of Alcatel Submarine Networks; however, these discussions came to an end in April 2019. Around this time, the French government reportedly continued to seek a round of financing, that was speculated to potentially include Orange Marine, in order to protect its strategic interests.

In January 2021, ASN launched construction of the Africa-1 submarine cable to connect Africa, the Middle East, and Europe. That same year, ASN added two more cable ships to its fleet, CS Ile d'Yeu and CS Ile de Molène. Two years later, Nokia and ASN added another cable ship to the fleet, CS Ile d'Ouessant; this vessel was purchased in 2019 and had been built in 2011 as the CS Toisa Warrior.

By 1 January 2022, ASN had laid more than 700,000 km of cable on the seabed, maintained more than 300,000 km of cable and commissioned more than 200 fibre optic systems.

On 27 June 2024, the French government announced that it had reached an agreement with Nokia to buy 80% of ASN's shares through the Agence des participations de l'État (APE). This decision meant that the 'strategic company' is once again controlled by a French shareholder, after the Finnish group had been considering the company's future for two years. The deal is valued at €100 million, drawn from the government's financial holdings special allocation account, whereas the total value of the company (including cash and debt) is €350 million. Nokia retains 20% of the capital, but the APE will be able to buy back this share, under conditions that have not been communicated. ASN reportedly held around a third of the global market, alongside TE SubCom of the US and NEC of Japan; its optical fibre now covers more than 800,000 kilometres of the Earth, almost twenty times its circumference. ASN operates in a growing market, with growth expected to be close to 10% per year until at least 2032, according to Global Market Insights. The French government completed its takeover of ASN by signing a contract to acquire 80% of the capital on 5 November 2024 in Calais, at the company's historic plant.

During March 2026, ASN announced that it would invest €100 million into the modernisation of its submarine cable factories in both Calais and Greenwich to enable the production of next-generation cables.

== Fleet ==
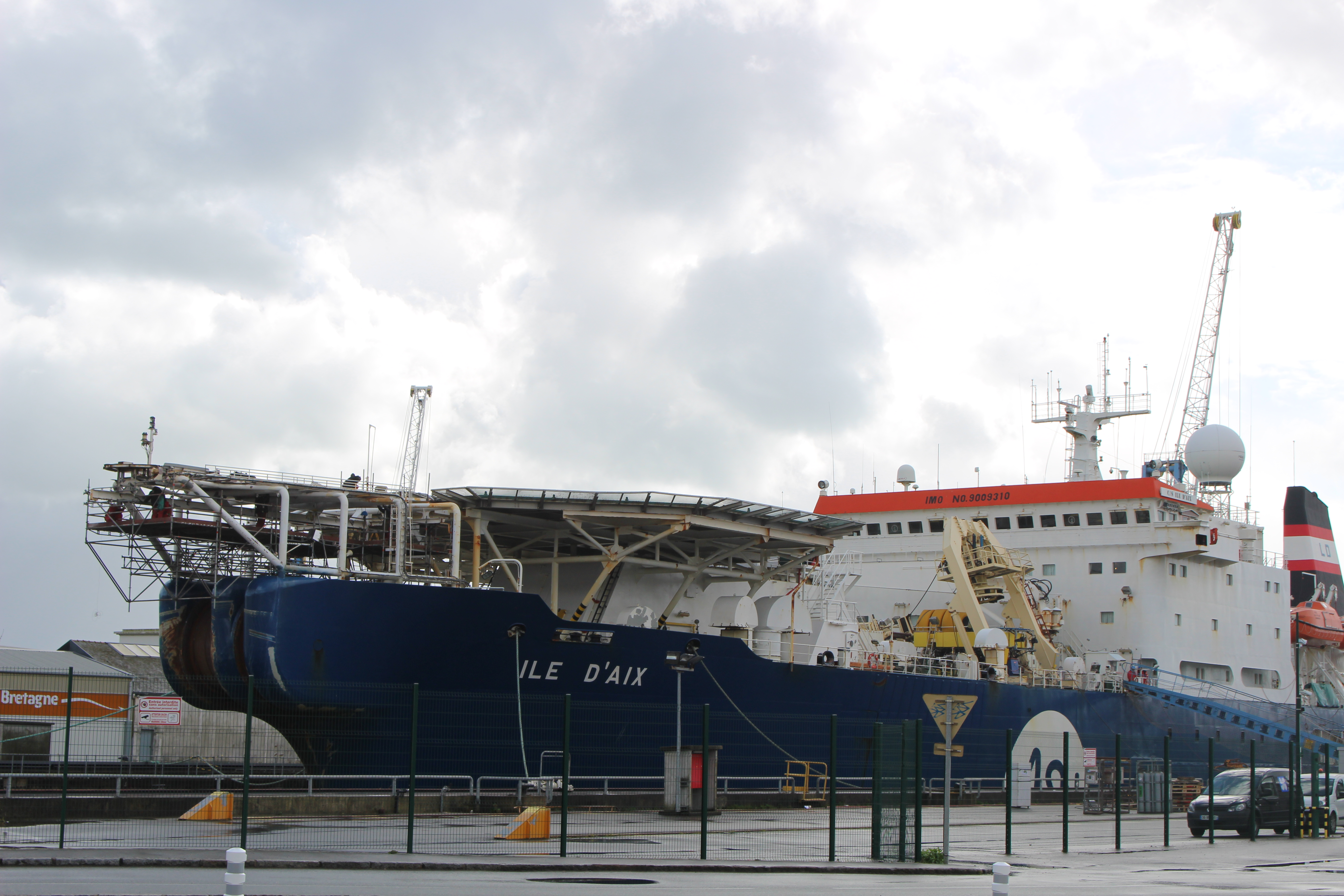
Nokia cable ship Île d'Aix in 2019

In 2023, ASN had seven vessels. The Île de Bréhat, Île de Batz, Île de Sein, Île d'Aix and Île d'Yeu are used to lay submarine cables, while the Île d'Ouessant and Île de Molène are used for cable maintenance.

In 2011, ASN purchased the CS Gulmar Badaro, renaming it CS Ile d'Aix, to further expand its operations. This vessel was built in 1992 and was equipped for cable repair and laying.

== See also ==
- List of international submarine communications cables
- Submarine communications cable
