= Tumo Center for Creative Technologies =

Free-of-charge education program for teenagers aged 12–18

TUMO Center for Creative Technologies
- Թումո Ստեղծարար Տեխնոլոգիաների Կենտրոն
- Type: Private institution
- Established: 2011
- Founders: Sam Simonian; Sylva Simonian
- Affiliations: Simonian Educational Foundation
- Director: Marie Lou Papazian
- Location: Yerevan, Armenia; 40°11′47.5″N 44°28′48.4″E
- Website: www.tumo.org

The TUMO Center for Creative Technologies (Armenian: Թումո ստեղծարար տեխնոլոգիաների կենտրոն) is a nonprofit, tuition-free after-school education center for teenagers aged 12–18, focused on skills at the intersection of technology and design.

Founded in 2011 in Yerevan, Armenia, TUMO combines self-directed learning, workshops, and project-based learning labs, without entrance exams or fees.

Since its founding, TUMO has expanded from Armenia into a global network of centers and satellite learning hubs operating across Europe, the Middle East, Asia, and the Americas. As of the mid-2020s, the organization reports 32,000+ active students and an international alumni community. In addition to its core teen program, TUMO operates other initiatives, including TUMO Studios, TUMO Labs, 42 Yerevan, the EU TUMO Convergence Center for Engineering and Applied Science, the Gyumri Market & Culinary School, and the Armenian Cultural Heritage Institute.

There are currently six TUMO centers in Armenia, located in Yerevan, Dilijan, Gyumri, Koghb, Kapan, and Yeghegnadzor. Until 2023, there used to be one TUMO center Stepanakert, Artsakh, with six TUMO boxes operating in neighboring towns, all of which are currently non-operational due to the expulsion of Nagorno-Karabakh Armenians.

In 2021, TUMO announced the 60 million dollar TUMO Armenia campaign to bring 16 TUMO Hubs and 110 TUMO Boxes to Armenia.

On February 19, 2018, at the World Congress on Information Technology conference in Hyderabad, India, TUMO received the "Implementation of the Digital Century" award.

In 2019, TUMO announced the TUMO Box, a mobile, technically equipped mini-center, made of a repurposed shipping container. Boxes can be installed in any city or village and serve as self-study areas for local youth. The first two TUMO Boxes were opened in Gavar and Berd. More than 30 TUMO Boxes exist in Armenia as of December 2025.

TUMO received the 2019 Europe Nostra Award in Education, Training and Outreach. The award is routinely given to organizations and individuals who make significant contributions in the areas of conservation, research and dedicated service.

In 2025, TUMO received the WISE Prize for Education by the Qatar Foundation at a ceremony in Doha, Qatar.

== Background ==
The TUMO Center for Creative Technologies was founded in Yerevan, Armenia in 2011, with the first center opening on August 14. Serj Tankian of System of a Down performed a solo concert at the center's opening ceremony.

TUMO is founded by Sam and Sylva Simonian, with funding fully provided through the pair's Simonian Educational Foundation.

=== Sam and Sylva Simonian ===
Sam Simonian is an Armenian-American entrepreneur and telecommunications engineer, best known as the co-founder, president, and chief executive officer of INET, a Texas-based telecommunications technology company. He was born and raised in Beirut, Lebanon, and emigrated to the United States in the mid-1970s following the outbreak of the Lebanese Civil War.

Simonian was educated at the AGBU Hovaguimian-Manougian Secondary School in Beirut and briefly attended the American University of Beirut before relocating to the United States at the age of 19. He later earned a degree in electrical engineering from the University of Texas at Arlington. After graduating, he worked at Electrospace Systems Inc., where he collaborated with engineers Elie Akilian and Mark Weinzierl on telecommunications systems.

In 1989, Simonian and his partners founded INET after leaving Electrospace Systems. INET’s first major product secured an early contract with Nippon Telegraph and Telephone, marking the company’s commercial breakthrough. Throughout the early 1990s, INET experienced rapid growth, expanding its portfolio and client base to include companies such as AT&T, Sprint, Ericsson, and British Telecom. By 1993, INET had become the fastest-growing privately-owned company in the Dallas area, earning a top ranking on the Dallas 100 list.

Simonian was named Entrepreneur of the Year for the U.S. Southwest by Inc. magazine and Ernst & Young.

In addition to his business activities, he has supported educational and philanthropic initiatives, particularly through contributions to the Armenian General Benevolent Union and founding the TUMO Center for Creative Technologies, citing the role of education in his own professional development.

Formerly a member of the AGBU council of trustees following his service on the Central Board from 2000 to 2019, Simonian was unanimously elected to be President of the Central Board of AGBU.

Simonian has received the distinguished Ellis Island Medal of Honor in May 2000 and was the recipient of Armenia’s highest award, the Anania Shirakatsi Medal, for his contribution to the preservation of the Armenian identity, services to the Motherland, as well as contributing to the friendship between Armenia and foreign states.

=== Leadership ===
TUMO is headed by chief executive officer (CEO) Marie Lou Papazian and chief development officer (CDO) Pegor Papazian. The two developed TUMO's educational program and led efforts to design and construct the center's first facility in Yerevan. The duo are married and have five children.

==== Marie Lou Papazian ====
Prior to running TUMO, Marie Lou Papazian headed the Education for Development Foundation, which brought together students from Armenia and the Diaspora through online education programs. Papazian holds a Master’s Degree in Computing in Education from Columbia University's Teachers College, another Master's Degree in Construction Management, and is a graduate of Harvard Business School's General Management Program.

Marie Lou Papazian has previously founded the Narod Network Project and the Three Pomegranates Network, nonprofit, internet-based education initiatives connecting Armenian schoolchildren worldwide. She has also led the construction management of several renowned high rise buildings in New York, including the Marriott Hotel near New York City’s World Trade Center.

In 2018, Papazian received the Movses Khorenatsi Medal by the Armenian Government, "the nation’s highest cultural honor, granted for outstanding achievements in education, culture, and the arts."

In 2019, Papazian was awarded the rank of Chevalier (Knight) of the Ordre des Palmes Académiques. This distinction, granted by the French Republic, recognizes outstanding contributions to education, culture, and the advancement of knowledge. Papazian was nominated for the honor by Gilles Pécout, Rector of the Academy of Paris and the Île-de-France region, who is also a recipient of the same order. She received the award by Paris Mayor Anne Hidalgo.

==== Pegor Papazian ====
Pegor Papazian holds a Bachelor of Architecture from the American University of Beirut, a Master of Science in computer science from the Massachusetts Institute of Technology (MIT), where he worked on artificial intelligence and design automation at the MIT AI Lab, and an MBA from the University of Chicago Booth School of Business.

Pegor Papazian has formerly served as the chief executive officer of the National Competitiveness Foundation of Armenia (NCFA). In this role, he has overseen large-scale public–private initiatives aimed at improving Armenia’s economic competitiveness, with a focus on education, tourism, healthcare, and communications infrastructure. Among the projects is the Tatev Revival Project, including the Wings of Tatev aerial tramway, which gained international recognition as the world’s longest reversible aerial tramway and significantly improved access to the Tatev Monastery complex. Papazian has also founded Bazillion Beings, a platform for virtual agents.

Prior to joining NCFA, Papazian worked as head of project development for the United States Agency for International Development (USAID) in Armenia. He previously held senior leadership roles in the private sector, including vice president of strategy and product development at Prosum Technology Services in California and as a founding partner of Design Technologies Consulting in Barcelona, Spain.

=== TUMO Foundation Board of Directors ===
- Sam Simonian (Founder, TUMO)
- Raffi Krikorian (Emerson Collective, Uber, Twitter)
- Roger Kupelian (VFX Artist, Fugitive Studios)
- Rev Lebaredian (VP of Omniverse and Simulation Technology, NVIDIA
- Vahe Kuzoyan (President, ServiceTitan)
- Katherine Sarafian (Producer, Pixar)
- Elie Akilian (Founder, KingsIsle)
- Nairi Tashjian Hourdajian (VP of Comms, Figma)

=== Advisory Board ===
- Serj Tankian, singer, songwriter, producer
- Katherine Sarafian, Senior VP at Pixar
- Roger Kupelian, VFX Artist, Fugitive Studios
- Alex Seropian, CEO of Industrial Toys

== Educational model ==
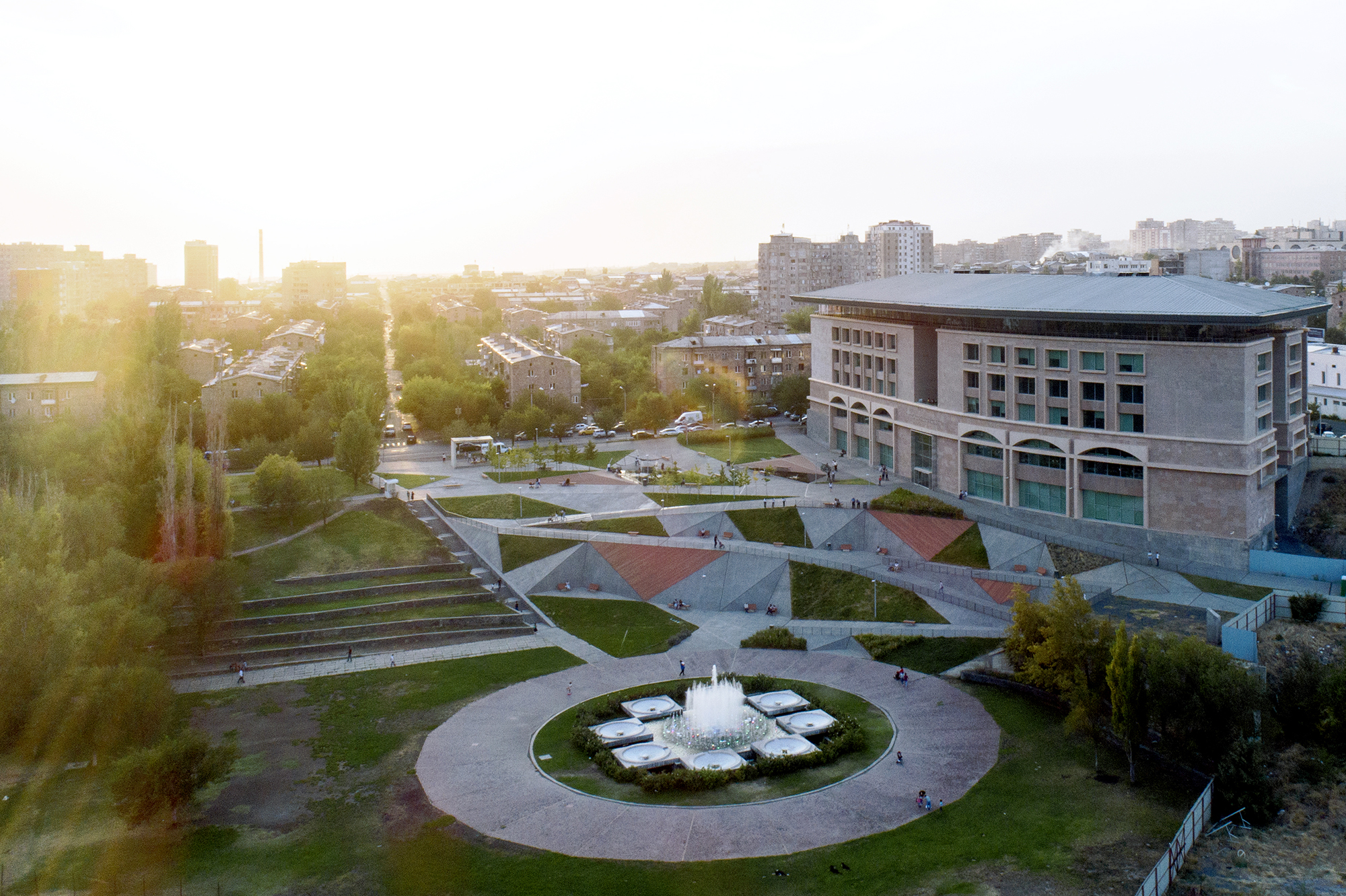
TUMO Yerevan

=== Program ===
TUMO operates as a tuition-free, extracurricular education program for teenagers aged 12–18. Participation is open, with no entrance exams or academic prerequisites. The program is structured to complement formal schooling and is delivered primarily after school hours and on weekends. A unique aspect of TUMO's education model is the TUMO Path, a software program developed in-house that places students on a learning plan based on the students' expressed areas of interest, showing the students' rate of progress and letting them know which tasks they need to complete to move on to the next level.

TUMO's curriculum consists of self-learning exercises, workshops and learning labs in 14 learning targets, including:

- Animation
- Game Development
- Filmmaking
- Web Development
- Music
- Writing
- Drawing
- Graphic Design
- 3D Modeling
- Programming
- Robotics
- Motion Graphics
- Photography
- GenAI

=== Curriculum ===
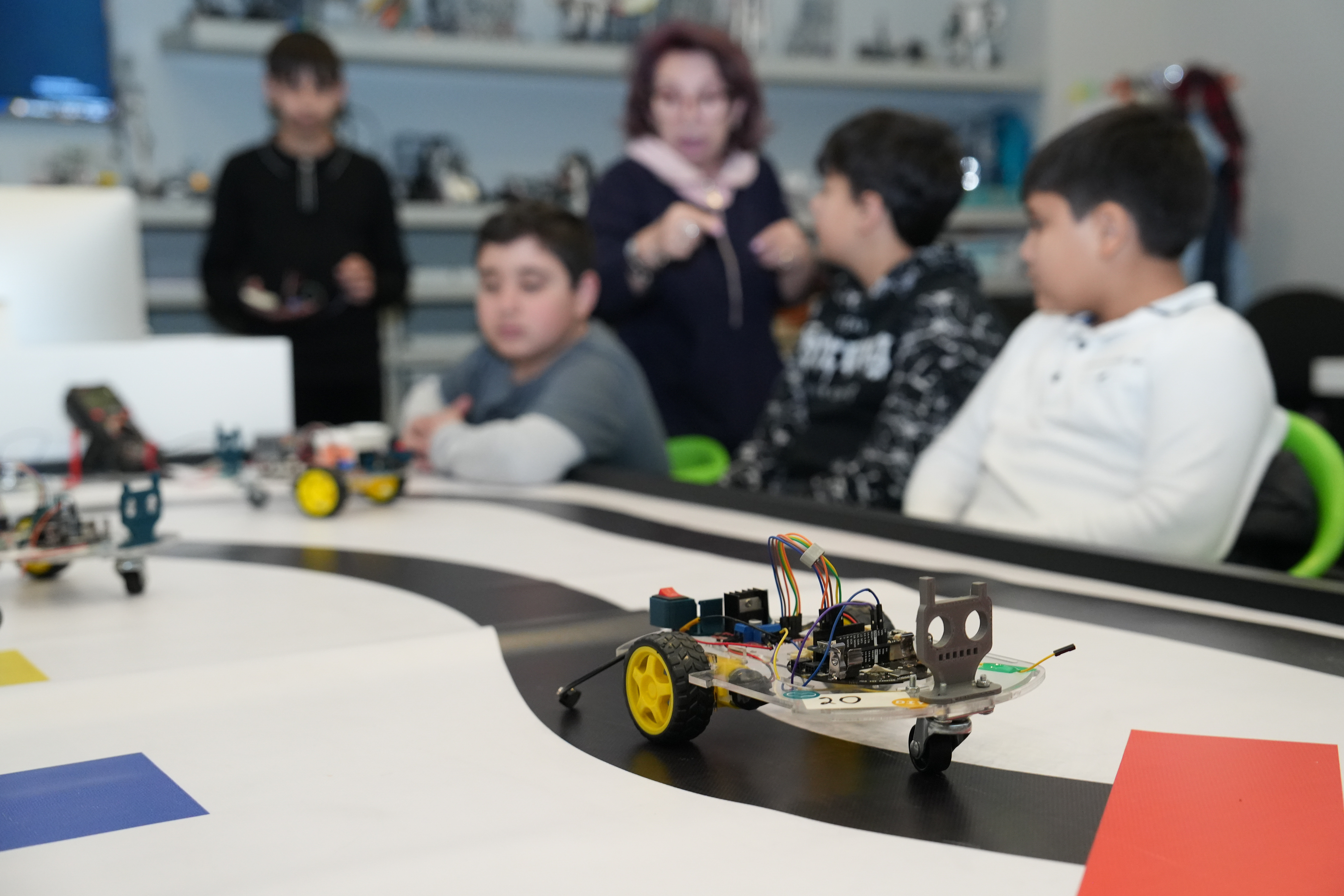
Students at the TUMO Yerevan robotics lab, 2025.

TUMO's learning system combines three interconnected components:

- Self-learning: Students work independently through interactive digital activities on the TUMO Path. These activities introduce core concepts and skills and allow students to progress at their own pace with support from on-site coaches.
- Workshops: Instructor-led, hands-on courses offered at beginner to advanced levels. Workshops are project-based and culminate in individual or group outcomes that demonstrate applied skills.
- Learning Labs: Time-bound, advanced programs led by local and international professionals. Labs focus on real-world challenges and extended projects and are typically offered to students who have completed prerequisite self-learning and workshops.

Rather than diplomas or certification, students build digital portfolios consisting of completed projects, which may be used for further education or employment applications.

=== Pedagogical approach ===
TUMO's educational approach emphasizes voluntary participation and learner autonomy. Often referred to by the organization as a "walk-away pedagogy", the model allows students to discontinue or change learning paths without penalty. The approach is intended to foster intrinsic motivation and reduce barriers between artistic and technical domains by emphasizing learning through making.

== Centers ==
=== TUMO Armenia ===
==== TUMO Yerevan ====
TUMO's first center opened in Yerevan in 2011. The center's namesake is inspired by next-door Tumanyan Park, which bears the name of prominent Armenian author Hovhannes Tumanyan. TUMO Yerevan was designed by architect Bernard Khoury. Approximately 15,000 students actively attend the center.

==== TUMO Dilijan ====
TUMO's second center in Dilijan opened in 2012 under a cooperative agreement between TUMO and the Armenian General Benevolent Union, with additional support from the Central Bank of Armenia.

==== TUMO Gyumri ====
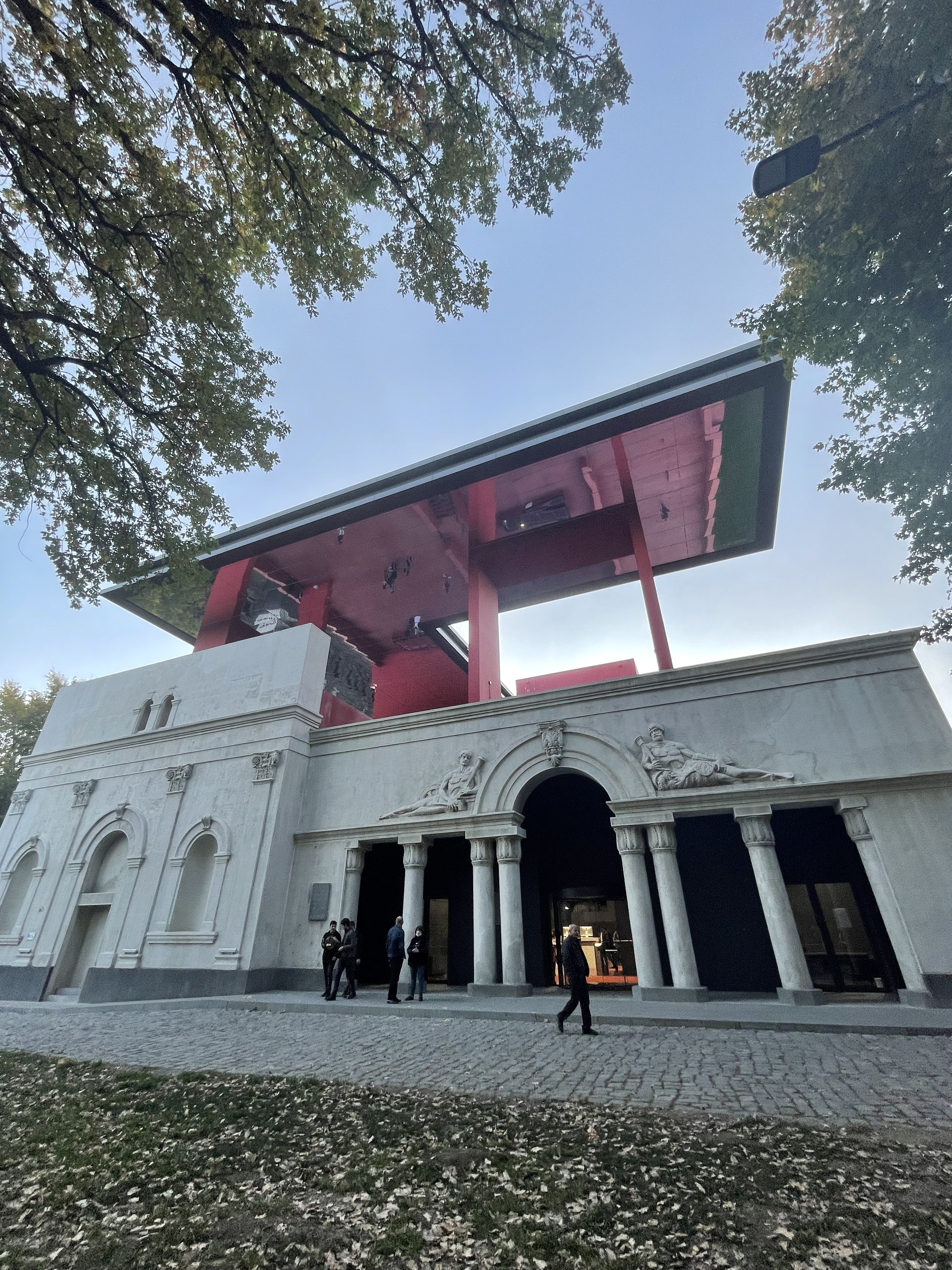
TUMO Gyumri

TUMO Gyumri started operating in a temporary location since 2015, after which it soon moved to the Gyumri Historical Theater Building, which TUMO restored in order to accommodate 4,000 students. The idea of TUMO Gyumri sprang from Shant TV, which kickstarted a fundraising drive to open the center. TUMO Gyumri is one of three TUMO centers (along with TUMO Dilijan and TUMO Stepanakert) to benefit from a cooperative partnership with the Armenian General Benevolent Union.

TUMO Gyumri was a nominee of the 2022 EUmies Awards.

==== TUMO Stepanakert (2015 – 2023) ====
TUMO Stepanakert is one of three areas of cooperation between TUMO and AGBU, first opened in 2015. It was located on the first floor of a historic building in the city, donated to TUMO on behalf of the Republic of Artsakh and renovated with the help of Karabakh Telecom. The center and its surrounding TUMO Boxes are currently non-operational following the 2023 Azerbaijani offensive and the expulsion of Nagorno-Karabakh Armenians.

==== TUMO Koghb ====
A new TUMO center in Armenia's north-eastern border village of Koghb opened its doors officially in June 2024. The center accommodates over 1,000 teenagers from Koghb and neighboring towns of Noyemberyan, Berdavan and beyond. The building, designed by architect Bernard Khoury, is equipped with high-tech workshop rooms, self-learning stations, a sound recording studio, a cinema, and a large sports facility.

==== TUMO Kapan ====
TUMO Kapan is the current regional center of the TUMO Center in Syunik, Armenia. Officially opened on March 2, 2024, the center is housed in the city's historic railway station building, which was renovated and repurposed as an educational and innovation hub. Serving as the main node of TUMO's network in southern Syunik, TUMO Kapan, together with nearby TUMO Boxes in Meghri and Kajaran and a later box in Goris, provides access to TUMO's educational program for approximately 2,500 teenagers from across the region, with transportation organized for students from surrounding communities.

The project was implemented in cooperation with the Municipality of Kapan and with support from the European Union's Resilient Syunik Team Europe initiative, as well as private donors. In addition to its core teen program, the center hosts post-secondary activities, including TUMO Labs, offering free applied learning in tech and engineering fields for participants aged 18 and over, and includes facilities for workshops, events, and collaborative work.

==== TUMO Masis ====
The town of Masis, to the south of Yerevan, is the latest addition to the TUMO family. With a partnership with the Masis Development Foundation the center will accommodate up to 1,000 students, with room for expansion.

==== TUMO Armavir ====
In 2024, it was announced that a new TUMO center would open in the town of Armavir, Armavir province, by the end of 2026.

==== TUMO Vanadzor ====
In 2026, it was announced that a new TUMO center would open in the city of Vanadzor, the capital of Armenia’s Lori Province, with full funding secured for its development. Planned to open by 2028, TUMO Vanadzor will deliver the complete TUMO educational program to approximately 5,500 teenagers across the region. The project has been made possible through a major philanthropic donation, alongside contributions from early private supporters, while the Government of Armenia has provided a historic building in Vanadzor to serve as the future home of the center, to be restored and repurposed as a learning hub.

=== TUMO International ===
==== TUMO Paris ====
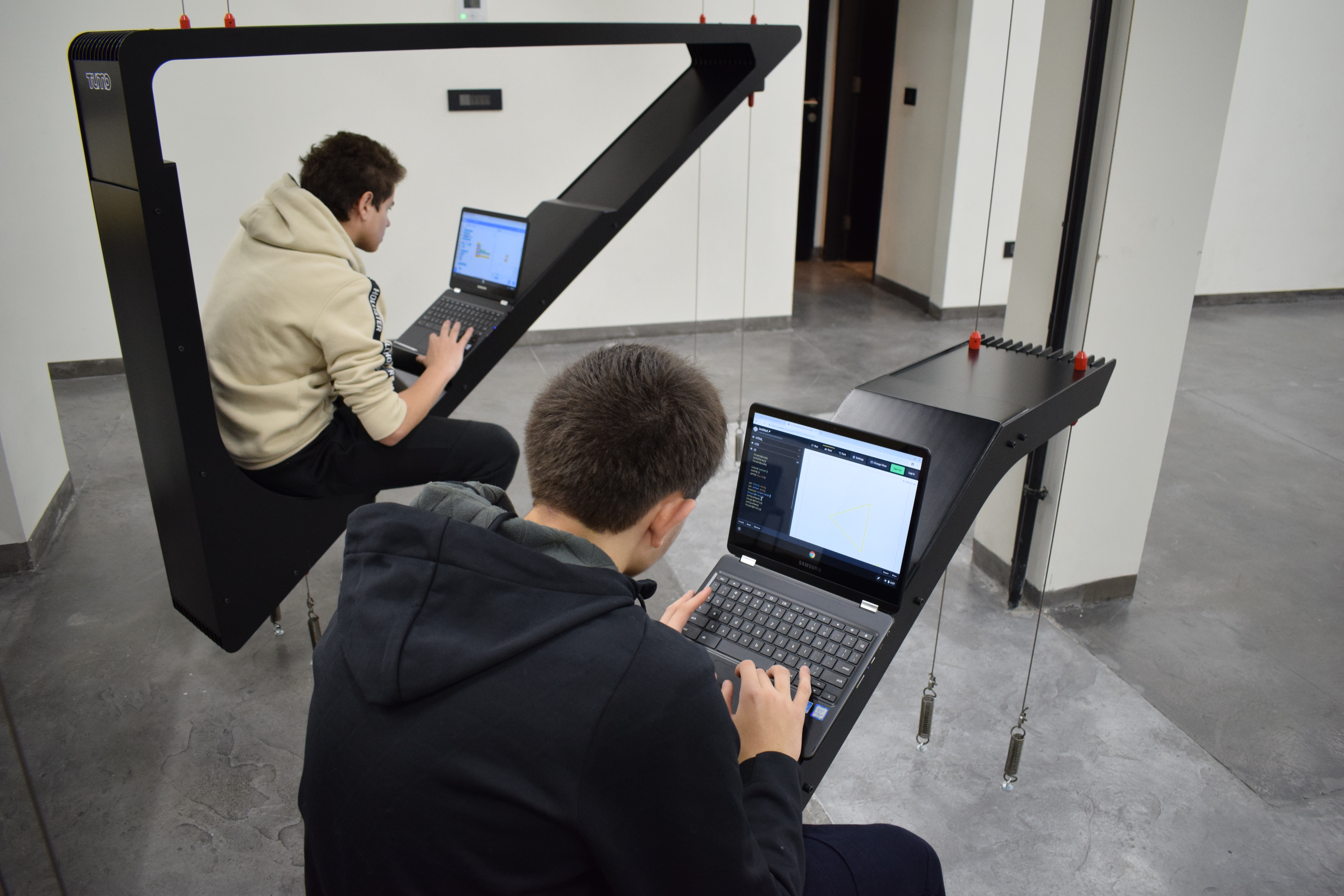
TUMO Beirut at the Beirut Digital District, 2019.

The first TUMO International Center opened in Paris in October 2018. It is located in the center of Forum des Images in Les Halles. Paris Mayor Anne Hidalgo initiated the process after visiting TUMO in Armenia.

==== TUMO Beirut ====
TUMO Beirut is the second TUMO center operating outside of Armenia and the first in the Middle East. It is located in the Beirut Digital District. The center unofficially opened in 2018 and operated for a while. A brand-new TUMO will be launched in Beirut in 2026.

==== TUMO Tirana ====
TUMO Tirana opened its doors in Tirana, October 2020. It was temporarily located in the Arena Business Center located in Albania's biggest stadium. After its reconstruction, in 2023, the center relocated to the Pyramid of Tirana. The Soviet-era landmark was revamped by MVRDV. TUMO Tirana was opened in cooperation with the American-Albanian Development Foundation and the Municipality of Tirana. TUMO Tirana is the first TUMO center in the Balkans.

==== TUMO Berlin ====
After a partnership agreement was signed between TUMO and KfW in Yerevan in January 2020, attended by Armenian Deputy Prime Minister Mher Grigoryan, TUMO Berlin launched in Berlin in November 2020. The new TUMO Center occupies four floors in a new building, located in the historic Charlottenburg district. The official opening of TUMO Berlin took place in August 2021.

It's worth noting that German Chancellor Angela Merkel had visited TUMO Yerevan in August, 2018, and said "I'm shocked in a real positive way. This Tumo is not for Armenia only. It's international. It's a philosophy." In June 2021, Merkel paid a virtual visit to TUMO Berlin, and visited the Center in-person in November of the same year.

==== TUMO Mannheim ====
The second German TUMO Center, TUMO Mannheim, was scheduled to open upon an agreement signed in Yerevan between TUMO, the KfW Group, and Starkmacher e.V. in December 2022. In September of 2024, the center opened in Mannheim, in September 2024 in the historic Lindenhof district.

==== TUMO Lyon ====
By December 2021, it was announced that the second center in France would be launched in 2022, in Lyon. TUMO Lyon (Auvergne-Rhône-Alpes) launched in January 2022 on the Campus Région du Numérique à Charbonnières.

==== TUMO Kyiv ====
In March 2020, TUMO announced plans to launch another center in Kyiv, Ukraine. In May 2020, Armenia's Ambassador to Ukraine, Tigran Seiranian, visited the future premises of TUMO Kyiv, which would be located in the 19th-century Arsenal Factory. TUMO Kyiv opened its doors September 2021, attended by the Ambassador of Armenia to Ukraine, Vladimir Karapetyan.

==== TUMO Marseille ====
TUMO Marseille opening its doors in 2025 in Marseille, France, as part of the organization's expansion in the country, joining existing centers such as TUMO Paris and TUMO Lyon. Located in the Hangar à Sucre in Marseille's 2nd arrondissement.

==== TUMO in Portugal ====
TUMO in Portugal launched its first center in Coimbra in September 2023. A second center opened in Lisbon in September 2024, in the Beato Innovation District, followed by the opening of TUMO Porto in October 2025. The Portuguese centers offer TUMO's tuition-free educational program for teenagers aged 12–18, combining self-directed learning, workshops, and project-based activities in areas including programming, robotics, animation, filmmaking, music, graphic design, game development, and generative AI. Each center has the capacity to serve approximately 1,500 students annually.

The introduction of TUMO to Portugal was made possible through partnerships with local municipalities, educational institutions, and private-sector supporters. All TUMO centers in Portugal are operated by the educational innovation organization, which oversees the program's expansion and implementation across the country.

==== TUMO Los Angeles ====
TUMO Los Angeles is the first U.S. branch of TUMO. Planning began in 2021, when California Assemblymember Adrin Nazarian secured state budget funding to establish the center in the San Fernando Valley. In June 2021, Nazarian announced that the 2021–22 state budget would include a $9 million USD appropriation to establish a TUMO Center in Los Angeles, in partnership with the City of Los Angeles. The funding package also included $1 million for USC's Armenian Studies Institute and $1 million for the Lark Musical Society.

By early 2023 the center's site had been acquired in North Hollywood, in the East San Fernando Valley. The chosen location was a vacant office building at 4146 Lankershim Boulevard in the NoHo Arts District of North Hollywood.

Construction was completed by 2024. A ceremonial groundbreaking took place on February 12, 2024. The City of Los Angeles press office reported that Mayor Karen Bass, Council President Paul Krekorian and TUMO founder Sam Simonian were on hand as crews broke ground on "the first TUMO Technology Learning Center in the United States." Bass said the center would provide "much needed design and technology education to local youth through after-school and weekend programs completely free of charge", and Krekorian said it would help develop "the next generation of creative leaders" for Los Angeles.

TUMO Los Angeles officially opened to the public in the autumn of 2025. An inauguration ceremony was held on October 18, 2025 at the center's North Hollywood. TUMO founder Sam Simonian said that what began as a dream in Yerevan had become "a global movement" and that he was "proud and grateful to announce that we are now here in Los Angeles, ready to change lives once again."

Serj Tankian, a member of TUMO's advisory board, has stated that the Los Angeles center will be located in North Hollywood. He has emphasized "the fact that it's in L.A., we can get actors, we can get filmmakers. I think the creative side, especially the entertainment creative side of the TUMO L.A, is gonna have a VIP list. I'm gonna get hassled to hassle people basically, for the next couple of years.

==== TUMO Amsterdam ====
In April 2024, TUMO Amsterdam was announced as the first TUMO Center in the Netherlands and was scheduled to open in 2025 in Amsterdam.

Developed as a public–private partnership between the City of Amsterdam, the Public Library of Amsterdam (OBA), and private-sector partners including TomTom, Adyen, Just Eat Takeaway.com, and Miro, the center was designed to serve up to 1,000 students, with plans for additional TUMO boxes to expand capacity.

The project was officially inaugurated on April 16 during a meeting attended by TUMO Chief Development Officer Pegor Papazian, Amsterdam Deputy Mayor Alexander Scholtes, and partner representatives. Located in Amsterdam-Zuidoost (near the Kraaiennest metro station), the center was set to operate within the OBA Next innovation lab and later the Amsterdam Library of the Future. The launch marked TUMO's tenth international center, further extending the network beyond Armenia.

TUMO Amsterdam opened its doors in fall of 2025.

==== TUMO Buenos Aires ====
In 2024, the Buenos Aires city government announced plans to open the first TUMO Center in Latin America. The Center was to be located at the Centro Metropolitano de Diseño (CMD) in the Barracas district and was initially scheduled to open in mid-2025. At that time, the city said it would eventually create three TUMO Centers in different districts (Barracas, Balvanera and Núñez) by 2026. The government committed roughly AR$800 million (about US$3 million) for equipment in the first site.

A signing ceremony was held in late 2024 at the CMD attended by Chief of Government of Buenos Aires Jorge Macri, Education Minister Mercedes Miguel, and TUMO founders Sam and Sylva Simonian (via video) and TUMO CDO Pegor Papazian.

In May 2025, the first South American center opened in Argentina, TUMO Buenos Aires at the Barraca's Metropolitan Design Center (CMD), an intelligent building from a recycled 1934 Fish Market retaining the old Art Deco façade, an urban indicator, located in the Barracas neighborhood.

==== TUMO Gunma ====
TUMO Gunma opened in the summer of 2025, at G Messe Gunma in Takasaki, Gunma Prefecture, Japan. The center was developed in partnership with the Government of Gunma Prefecture. The opening ceremony was attended by TUMO founders Sam and Sylva Simonian, the Governor of Gunma Prefecture, Ichita Yamamoto, former Japanese Digital Transformation Minister Taro Kono, representatives of the Armenian National Assembly, and the Armenian Ambassador to Japan.

The center was projected to serve thousands of students from across the prefecture and acted as a springboard for future centers and TUMO Boxes planned in other Japanese cities such as Maebashi and Kusatsu.

During a visit in September 2025, Armenia's Minister of Education, Science, Culture, and Sports highlighted the center's role in extending TUMO's learning model and its expected annual capacity of up to 9,400 students once fully operational.

TUMO Gunma's establishment coincided with Armenia's participation at Expo 2025 Osaka, where TUMO's educational initiatives were showcased. The pavilion won Silver in the Connecting Lives category.

==== TUMO Hirschaid ====
TUMO expanded its presence in Hirschaid, Germany, with the opening of TUMO Hirschaid on 31 January 2025, adding to existing centers in Berlin and Mannheim.

Located at the MINT-Zentrum Hirschaid and funded by Germany's Federal Ministry of Education and Research and KfW, the center was designed by Austrian architect Thomas Herzig and was built to serve up to 500 students per week, with approximately 200 enrolled at launch.

Further expansion was announced with additional centers planned in Lüdenscheid, Saarbrücken, and Essen, continuing TUMO's rollout in Germany.

==== TUMO Mumbai ====
In August 2025, TUMO announced the launch of TUMO Mumbai, in partnership with the Shantilal Shanghvi Foundation, housed in Shikha Academy's brand-new building. The center opened in November 2025, as India's first TUMO center and TUMO's first South Asian location.

==== TUMO Astana ====
Plans for TUMO Astana were formalized following an agreement between TUMO and Astana Hub, establishing the first TUMO Center in Central Asia.

The center was planned to operate from the alem.ai International Center for Artificial Intelligence in Astana, Kazakhstan, and to offer the signature program. The project formed part of Kazakhstan's broader national strategy to expand digital skills training and was aligned with government initiatives aimed at training one million citizens in digital competencies.

The opening of TUMO Astana was publicly confirmed by President Kassym-Jomart Tokayev during a joint press briefing with Armenian Prime Minister Nikol Pashinyan, who highlighted cooperation between Kazakhstan and Armenia in artificial intelligence, advanced technologies, and digital solutions. Officials stated that the center would serve as a platform for knowledge exchange and youth development within Kazakhstan's innovation ecosystem, with its launch scheduled for 2025-2026.

The center held its official opening in April 2026, housed at the alem.ai International Center for Artificial Intelligence.

==== TUMO Bilbao-Bizkaia ====
TUMO opened Bilbao-Bizkaia in May 2026, located in the iconic Azkuna Zentroa - Alhóndiga Bilbao, originally built as a wine warehouse in 1909 and reimagined by designer Philippe Starck. The center began with Summer Sessions from 29 June to 3 July 2026, followed by the start of the regular school year on 5 October 2026. Initial capacity is 1,000 students for the 2026 to 2027 school year, expanding to 1,500 students from the 2027 to 2028 school year, when two additional learning areas, 3D modeling and generative AI, are also scheduled to be introduced.

==== TUMO Uruguay ====
The TUMO Uruguay center is being established with the support of Corporación América Airports, Aeropuertos Uruguay and Ceibal.

Located within the Carrasco International Airport area, TUMO Uruguay opened in April 2026.

==== TUMO Frankfurt ====
In April 2026, a TUMO center opened in Frankfurt, Germany, housed in the Nordwestzentrum and spanning 2,000 square meters. The opening was attended by Frankfurt Mayor Mike Josef and Hesse's Digital Minister Kristina Sinemus, among other civic and institutional figures. The center launched with capacity for up to 1,000 participants across eight disciplines: robotics, 3D modeling, animation, game development, film production, music production, graphic design, and programming. Funding for the first three years of operation, totaling 3.5 million euros, was raised by the TUMO Förderverein, a local support association, with additional backing from the state of Hesse and the city of Frankfurt. TUMO Frankfurt is the seventh TUMO center in Germany. The Frankfurt location also introduced a new architectural feature, glass "Qubes" for workshop rooms, developed for the first time anywhere in the TUMO network.

==== TUMO Buenos Aires (Chacarita) ====
On 30 July 2026, a third TUMO center opened in Buenos Aires, located at Concepción Arenal 4271 in the Chacarita neighborhood, near the Federico Lacroze station and the Line B subway. With this opening, Buenos Aires became the first city in the world to operate three TUMO centers, joining existing sites at the Centro Metropolitano de Diseño in Barracas and the Parque de Innovación in Núñez. The inauguration was led by City of Buenos Aires Chief of Government Jorge Macri, alongside Education Minister Mercedes Miguel and TUMO Buenos Aires executive director Pedro Moneda, and was also attended by the Armenian ambassador to Argentina, Hovhannes Virabyan, along with representatives of Buenos Aires's Armenian community organizations.

The Chacarita center has capacity for more than 7,300 students and is staffed by 18 workshop leaders, 26 coaches, a center manager, and a team leader. Combined, the three centers were expected to serve around 20,000 students annually.

== TUMO Box ==
The TUMO Box project was announced in 2019. TUMO Boxes function as satellite TUMO centers wirelessly connected to larger TUMO centers. This project will allow rural Armenian youth outside of close proximity to a TUMO branch to access TUMO's educational program. The TUMO Box is mobile and can easily be installed in any city or village, functioning as a self-learning center for local youth. Upon completing self-learning activities at their local TUMO Box, students will travel to the nearest TUMO branch for specialized workshops and project labs.

The project first opened its doors in Berd and in Gavar as part of a collaboration among TUMO, Amundi-ACBA, and the HAYG Foundation. Upon completing self-learning activities in the TUMO Box's, students can then travel to TUMO Dilijan for more hands-on, practical training. TUMO Boxes will initially provide education in technology and design to about 250 students a year.

On December 20, 2021, a TUMO Box was opened in Vayk alongside two other boxes in Kapan and Sevan on the same day. This box is supported by Dr. Armineh and Dr. Ara Tavitian.

The box in Sevan was opened on December 20, 2021, with the support of an anonymous donor.

The box in Kapan is supported by Lara Arslanian, Garabed Bardakjian and Sarine Semerjian. The box will remain in place for one year, after which it will be replaced by the full-featured TUMO Kapan center inside the city's historic train station, currently being renovated thanks to a generous donation by Judy Saryan and Victor Zarougian.

The TUMO box in Martakert, the first in Artsakh, marked the launch of TUMO's Artsakh expansion program. TUMO Stepanakert has welcomed approximately 4000 students and held over 300 workshops, 100 learning labs, and countless special projects with the support of AGBU since 2015. Students from Martakert participate in the self-learning portion of the program at the box, and commute to TUMO Stepanakert for workshops and learning labs, using a specially organized transportation system.

== EU TUMO Convergence Center ==
The EU TUMO Convergence Center for Engineering and Applied Science is a planned mixed-use STEM education, research, and innovation complex in Yerevan, Armenia, developed by the TUMO Center for Creative Technologies with financial support from the European Union. Conceived as a hub linking higher education, industry, and entrepreneurship, the center targets university students and young professionals aged 18 and above, extending the TUMO educational model beyond secondary education into applied science and engineering fields.

Plans for the Convergence Center were first revealed in 2019, when TUMO organized an international architectural competition to design the complex. Sixty-seven architecture firms from over two dozen countries expressed interest, and the Dutch firm MVRDV was ultimately selected for demonstrating a strong understanding of the project's educational vision and urban context. The Armenian government later allocated land adjacent to the existing TUMO Yerevan campus for the project, with construction plans initially announced to begin under an EU grant program.

The flagship building of the Convergence Center was publicly unveiled in March 2023. Designed by MVRDV, it is conceived as an innovative horizontal skyscraper stretching roughly 190–200 meters along the edge of the Hrazdan Gorge, rising six stories and occupying approximately 17,000 square meters. The structure consists of around 300 modular spaces housed within a large internal hall, creating a flexible "building-within-a-building" system intended to maximize energy efficiency while blending indoor and open-air environments.

The Convergence Center is planned as a €25 million EUR ecosystem composed of three main components: learning and research programs, conference and exhibition facilities, and working and retail spaces. A central element is TUMO Labs, a fee-free applied science and engineering platform where students and young professionals collaborate on research and development projects with academic institutions and local and international technology companies. Additional facilities are intended to include conference halls, coworking and training spaces, and modular offices alongside ground-level retail and public amenities. The project forms part of a broader redevelopment plan integrating the existing TUMO campus, nearby technology companies, and the site of the future Halabyan metro station.

== TUMO Studios ==
TUMO Studios is a nonprofit educational program in Yerevan, Armenia, launched in 2017 as an initiative of the TUMO Center for Creative Technologies to foster contemporary design and traditional craftsmanship among university-aged students and young professionals. The program offers free ateliers (educational workshops) where participants engage in hands-on learning across a range of analog design and craft disciplines, including jewelry, ceramics, embroidery, printmaking, fashion, accessories, wood carving, stone carving, product design, culinary arts, and perfume design. TUMO Studios combines Armenia's rich artisanal heritage with contemporary design methods and trends, aiming to cultivate a new generation of Armenian designers and artisans capable of raising the quality and competitiveness of local production on a global scale.

Previously housed in a historic early 20th-century townhouse in the heart of Yerevan on 38 Pushkin Street, TUMO Studios also operates a physical and online shop where products created by students and atelier participants are made available for purchase. Revenue from the shop helps support and expand the educational program, enabling further investment in the training and creative development of emerging artisans. The program connects local students and young professionals with international designers and craftspeople who lead ateliers, thereby fostering exchanges of knowledge and exposure to global design perspectives.

Since its inception, TUMO Studios has served as a platform not only for design education but also for community-oriented creative initiatives. Through projects such as the "Hand by Hand" initiative, TUMO Studios brings together displaced artisans — for example, women from Artsakh — to collaborate in producing handcrafted goods that carry cultural and personal narratives, thereby supporting both creative expression and economic resilience in diverse communities.

== TUMO Labs ==
TUMO Labs, launched in 2020, is a tuition-free applied science and engineering education initiative associated with the TUMO Center for Creative Technologies and serving as the primary educational component of the EU TUMO Convergence Center for Engineering and Applied Science in Yerevan, Armenia. It was developed as part of the Convergence Center's mission to connect higher education with industry, offering practical, industry-relevant training and project-based learning for university students and young professionals aged 18 and over.

The program is designed around a combination of guided self-learning and project-based learning, with curricula that respond to evolving demands in technology, science, and engineering. Participants can gain foundational knowledge in areas such as programming languages (e.g., Python, machine learning, and JavaScript) and work on real-world projects in cooperation with academic and industry partners. This blended educational approach aims to equip learners with practical skills that align with global labor market needs and to foster innovation within Armenia's emerging tech ecosystem.

TUMO Labs also encompasses 42 Yerevan, the Armenian branch of the global École 42 network of tuition-free computer programming schools, where students refine coding skills through a peer-to-peer, self-paced platform emphasizing project completion rather than formal instruction. This integration expands TUMO Labs' offerings into software engineering and other advanced disciplines.

Since its inception, TUMO Labs has undertaken targeted initiatives, including cybersecurity and incubation programs that support entrepreneurship. For example, in December 2024, the organization launched a long-term cybersecurity initiative in partnership with the Armenian Information Systems Agency and international development organizations to train young professionals in critical cybersecurity skills. It has also run 12-week technology ideation and incubation programs focused on sectors such as EdTech, GreenTech, HealthTech, and AgriTech, helping participants validate business ideas and access mentorship and seed funding.

== Camp TUMO ==
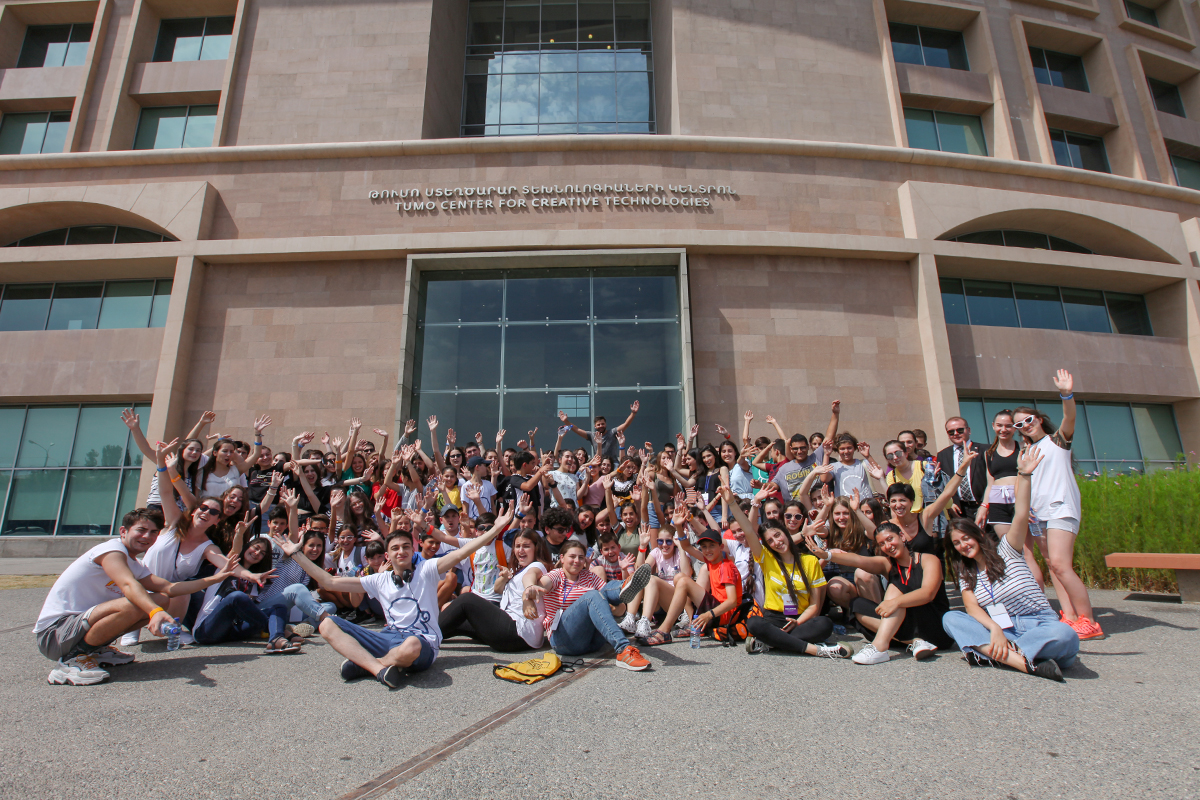
Participants at Camp TUMO in 2019

Camp TUMO is an annual summer educational program associated with the TUMO Center for Creative Technologies, first taking place in 2012 and designed to bring teens from Armenia and around the world together to learn technology, design, and creative skills in an immersive summer-camp setting. The camp combines hands-on workshops, project-based learning, cultural activities, and social experiences, allowing participants to deepen their knowledge in areas related to digital media, coding, robotics, and other creative technologies while engaging with peers and exploring Armenian cultural heritage.

Camp TUMO is typically held in Yerevan and Dilijan, offering both day camp and sleepaway options for students ranging roughly from 10 to 18 years old, with program themes often including animation, game development, graphic design, photography, programming, and music, among other areas. The curriculum is structured around a combination of workshops and theme-oriented activities, and many sessions include field trips and cultural exploration activities alongside technology and design instruction.

Since its inception, the program has attracted hundreds of campers from dozens of countries, fostering a cross-cultural learning environment that encourages collaboration and friendships among young participants from diverse backgrounds. Efforts such as #SponsorTheKids have sought to expand access for teens from border regions of Armenia and displaced youth from Artsakh, helping them participate in Camp TUMO's technology-focused summer experience.

Camp TUMO's curriculum typically includes a range of specialized workshops and courses, such as "Build-a-Bot" robotics, 3D modeling, animation, game design, photography, filmmaking, and music production, allowing campers to design and complete creative projects over the course of one-week themed sessions. Beyond technical skills, the camp emphasizes creative problem-solving, collaboration, and cultural exchange, giving participants exposure to Armenian history and contemporary cultural sites through guided outings and activities.

== See also ==
- Education in Armenia
