= Mass media in Lebanon =

Mass media in Lebanon has been described as among the most liberal and free in the Middle East. Despite its small population and geographic size, Lebanon plays an influential role in the production of information in the region and sits at the "core of a regional media network with global implications".

== News agencies ==
Lebanon has two state-owned news agencies: The National News Agency (NNA), an Arabic- and English-language newspaper that launched in 1961 and had about 600 subscribers in 1974, and Al-Markazia, known in English as the Central News Agency, publishes only in Arabic.

== Press ==
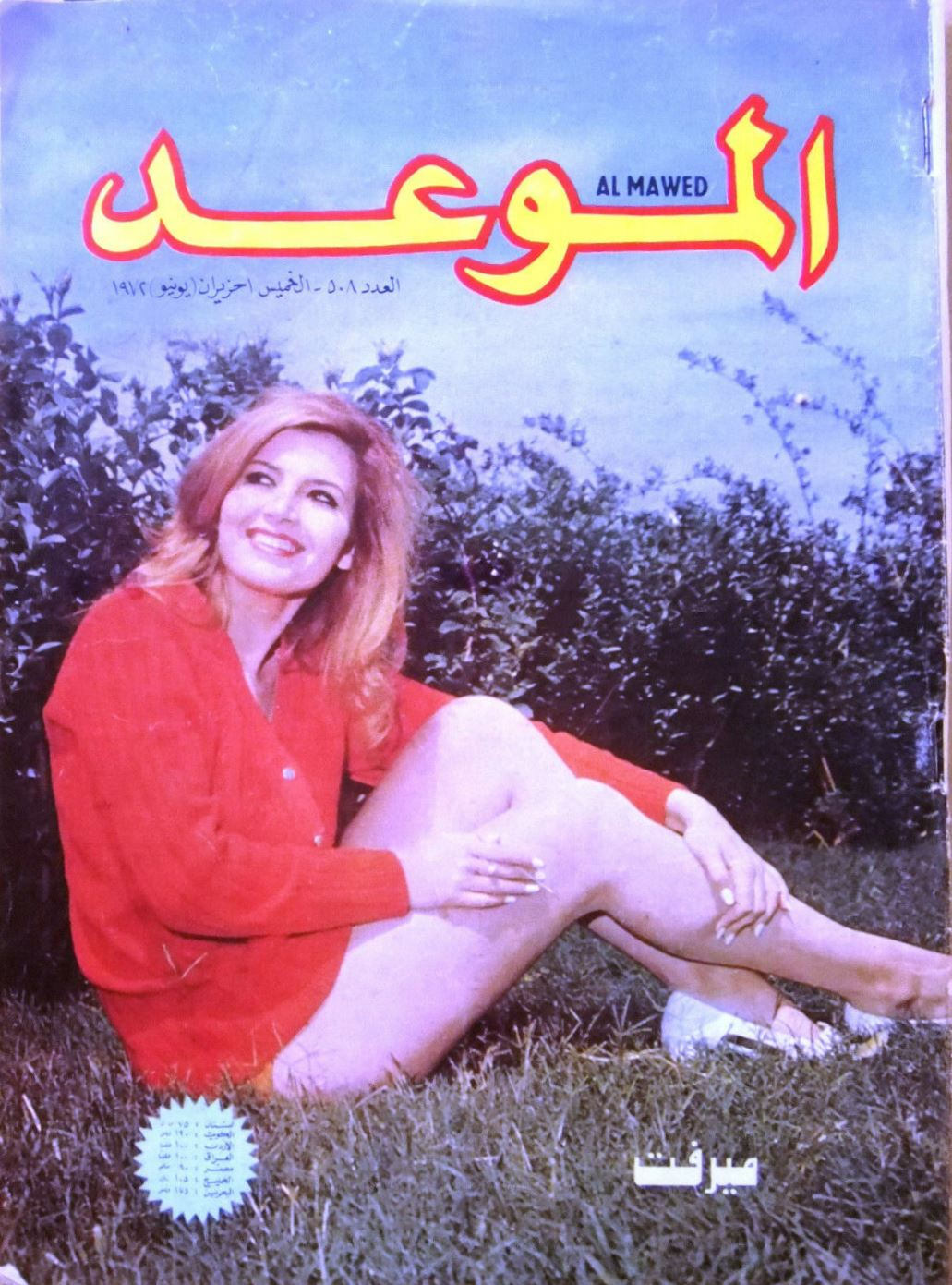
Egyptian actress Mervat Amin on the cover of the Lebanese magazine Al-Maweid, June 1972

The history of publishing in Lebanon dates back to 1610 when the first printing press was established at the Convent of Saint Anthony of Qozhaya in the Kadisha Valley, making its first publication, Qozhaya Psalter -the Bible's book of psalms, which was in both Syriac and Arabic, the first publication in the Middle East. One of the first Arabic-script, printing presses in the region was founded in 1734 at The Convent of St. John in Khinshara where it remained in operation until 1899.

In the second half of the nineteenth century, Beirut had become not only a multi-religious, commercial center but also an intellectual one, especially after the establishment of two private, higher education institutes, the American University of Beirut in 1864 and the Saint Joseph University in 1875, and it was this period that marked the emergence of Beirut's prolific press. Lebanese publishers and journalists, along with Syrians, also played a major role in establishing the Egyptian press in the nineteenth century.

After independence, Beirut emerged as the epicenter of publishing in the Arab world, characterized by free and liberal media and literary scenes. In the 1940s, Beirut was home to 39 newspapers, as well as 137 periodicals and journals that were published in three languages. Beirut also hosted the first book fair in the Arab world in 1956. By the early sixties, there were close to a hundred publishers and more than 250 printing presses in Lebanon. Armenian publications also flourished in Beirut, with over 44 publications, including dailies and periodicals. In 1962 the press law came into effect which was introduced by President Fuad Chebab. As of September 2013, the law still regulates printed media in the country.

Authors from Syria, Palestine and elsewhere in the Arab world found refuge in Lebanon's free and liberal publishing industry. Lebanon's press became a huge industry despite the country's small size and has remained a haven for Arabic publishing. The establishment of modern printing presses and sophisticated book distribution channels made Beirut a regional publishing leader, and gave the Lebanese publishers a dominant role in Arab publishing. Lebanon hosts annually two important regional publishing events, the Beirut Book Fair and the Beirut Francophone Book Fair.

== Television ==
Television in Lebanon was introduced in 1959, with the launch of two privately owned stations, CLT and Télé Orient that merged in 1977 into Télé Liban. Lebanon has ten national television channels, with most being affiliated or supported by certain political parties or alliances. Al Mayadeen, for example, is close to Hezbollah and was launched on 11 June 2012.

== Radio ==
The first radio service began in 1938 in Lebanon. There are many private radio stations in the country. Two of the leading stations are BBC Arabic and Radio France Internationale. Additionally, local stations People's Voice and Lebanon Voice are also popular radio outlets.

== Internet ==
Lebanon was one of the first countries in the Arab world to introduce the internet, and Beirut's newspapers were the first in the region to provide readers with web versions of their newspapers. By 1996, three newspapers from Lebanon were online, Al Anwar, An-Nahar, and As-Safir, and by 2000, more than 200 websites provided news out of Lebanon like the leading Daily Beirut news portal. Internet penetration from 2013 to 2016 has increased rapidly in Lebanon. Use of social media platforms like Facebook has seen growth and has been highest in the Middle East, as 77% for Lebanon in 2017. As per August 2017, there are around 3.4 million users on Facebook from Lebanon. The Instagram count is 1.3 million.

== See also ==
- Posts and telecommunications in Lebanon
- Federation of Arab News Agencies (FANA)
