= Posts and telecommunications in Lebanon =

Postal services and telecommunications have long played an essential role in Lebanon, a small country with an expansive diaspora, a vivid media landscape, and an economy geared toward trade and banking. The sector's history has nonetheless been chaotic, marked by conflict but also, and perhaps most importantly, a deeply rooted legacy of state control, weak competition, and intense politicization. A combination of poor services and high prices culminated in popular protests against the government's attempt, in October 2019, to tax the widely used messaging service WhatsApp. The anger this measure triggered captured a more general sense of dissatisfaction, and contributed to tipping the country into a protracted crisis. Civil unrest coincided with Lebanon's default on its ballooning debt; in the ensuing economic collapse, telecommunications have been among the infrastructure most affected.

== Postal services ==
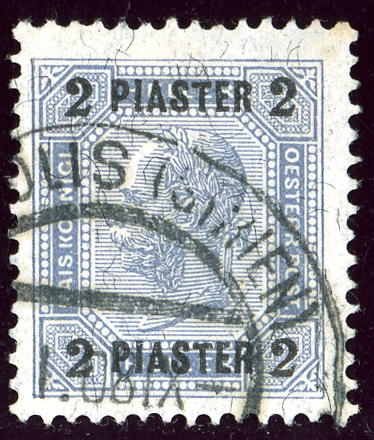
An Austrian stamp used in 1908 in Tripoli

France first established a post office (or "bureau de recette") in the port of Beirut in November 1845. It would use French stamps and was designed primarily to facilitate French trade absent an effective Ottoman postal service. Indeed, although Lebanon was an integral part of the Ottoman Empire, the latter was in a state of growing disarray. Its overland postal services were notoriously slow and unreliable; moreover, the Ottoman Empire lacked any steamship capacity in the Mediterranean, and was thus incapable of effectively connecting coastal cities in its own empire, not to mention beyond.

By contrast, French postal services could rely on the private shipping company Paquebots de la Mediterrannee, which ran a steamship line between Marseille, Alexandria, and Beirut three times a month. On 4 October 1851, the French government allocated the concession to a state-run company, which was incorporated the following year as the Compagnie des Services Maritimes des Messageries Nationales. The latter changed names on various occasions over the years, but retains a presence in Lebanon to this day: What was known as of 1853 as the Compagnie des Messageries Imperiales was renamed in 1871 Compagnie des Messageries Maritimes, which ultimately would become, in 1996, part of CMA-CGM, which is still the main shipping operator in the port of Beirut.

The Ottoman Empire's technological disadvantage created space for empires other than France. Back in 1845, Austria may in fact have set up the first foreign post office in Beirut, although the exact date is unconfirmed. Russia inaugurated its own in 1857, Britain in 1873, and Germany in 1900. Although imperial attention focused on Beirut, France opened in Tripoli a second post office in September 1852, followed by Austria and Russia. Ottoman authorities repeatedly petitioned against this encroachment on its sovereignty, and attempted to improve their own postal services to compete, but to no avail. On the contrary, foreign networks continued to expand their coverage and range of services, notably through money transfers. In the late 19th century, French post offices liaised between Lebanon's expanding diaspora in the Americas and the homeland, going as far as to collect and deliver mail directly in villages as of 1906. Such activities came to halt in 1914, when all foreign posts were closed in the context of the world war.

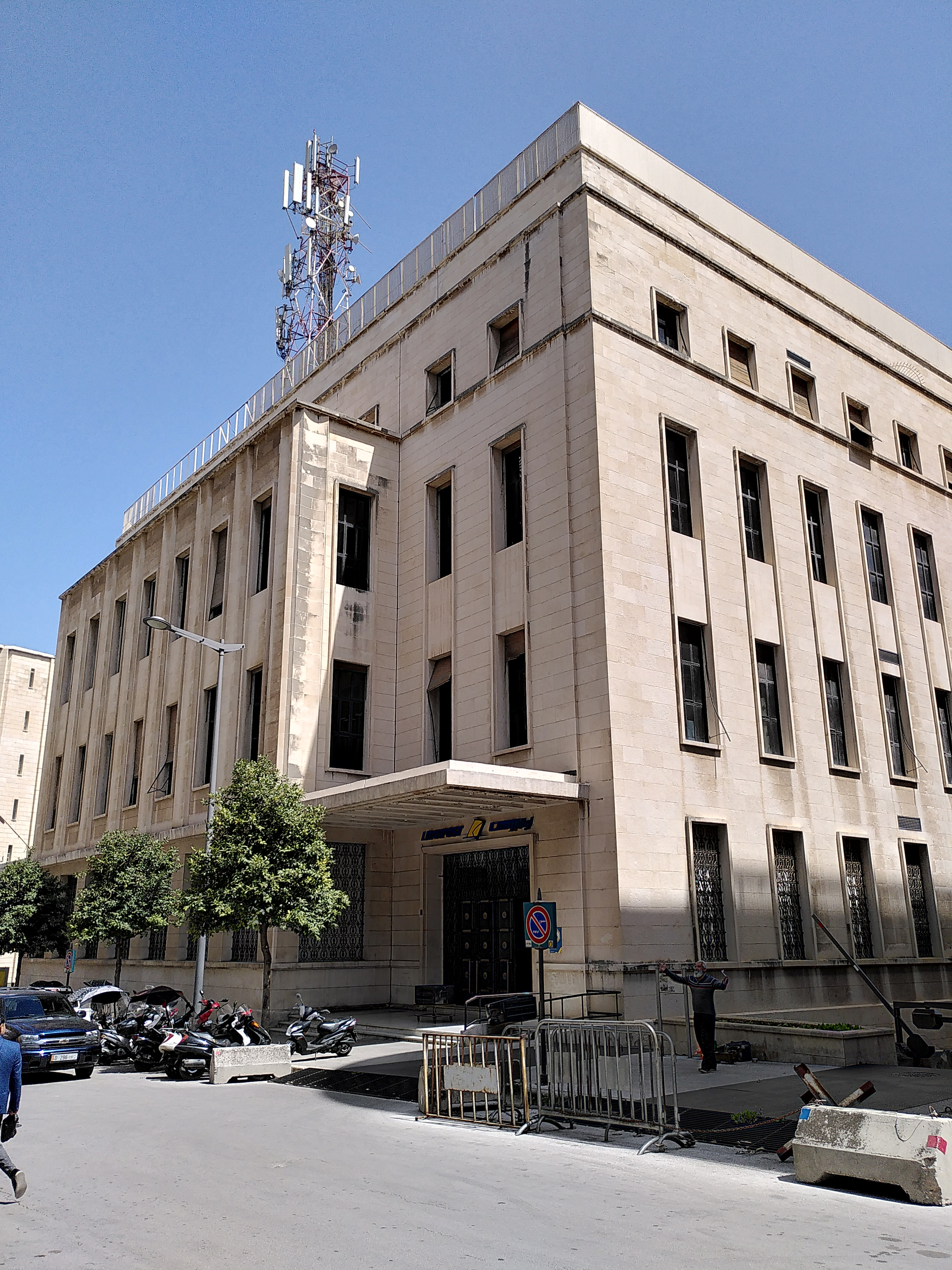
The Hotel des Postes et Telegraphes in 2022

French posts resumed in 1918, first as a military service before being extended to civilians. France, as a mandatory power, formed on 1 January 1921 an "Inspection Generale des Postes et Telegraphes" covering both Lebanon and Syria, before the two countries enjoyed their own separate postal administrations in 1924. Lebanon continued to use French stamps, overprinted "Grand Liban" and soon "Republique Libanaise". Arabic was introduced in 1928. As of 1929, a weekly airmail service connected Beirut to France's Mediterranean city of Marseille, via Greece and Italy.

With Lebanon's independence in 1943, telecommunications fell under a ministry of posts and telegraphs (which in the 1950s would become the ministry of posts, telegraphs, and telephones, and in 1980 the ministry of posts and telecommunications). The now independent Lebanon joined the Universal Postal Union in 1945. In 1946, an architectural competition was held to design a spectacular "Hôtel des Postes et Télégraphes", which remains a highlight of downtown Beirut.

During the civil war that consumed Lebanon from 1975 to 1990, various factions established their own postal services, notably the Christian Phalanges as soon as 1975. In 1983, Israeli forces did as much in occupied Saida, setting up postal services for the benefit of their troops, but which were also accessible to Lebanese citizens. In a sense, these developments echoed the country's not-so-distant history.

Beirut main post office, which was heavily damaged during the fighting, was renovated in 1996. The Lebanese government then privatized its postal services through a "build-operate-transfer" scheme, or BOT. The bid, launched in October 1998, was won by the Canadian investment company SNC-Lavalin, which in partnership with Canada Post operated Lebanese postal services through the company registered as LibanPost. In 2001, arguing that they were losing money, its Canadian investors sold LibanPost to Lebanon Invest (which later merged with the Audi investment bank). It belongs since 2011 or 2012 to the groups M1, co-founded by Lebanese prime minister Najib Mikati, and Saradar, which enjoys close ties to Audi.

== Telegraph ==
Beirut's first telegraphic lines connected it to Damascus in 1861 and to Istanbul two years later.

Lebanon's first submarine, telegraphic cable was laid in 1938 by France, as it prepared for war, and connected Beirut to Nabeul in Tunisia. After the war, it was operated by Radio-Orient (see below).

Teleprinters, which could turn telegraphic communications into text, started operating in May 1954.

== Telephone ==
The first mention of a telephone network in Lebanon (then known as Syria) dates from 1910 and, surprisingly, concerns the secondary town of Zahle in Mount Lebanon, which was also applying at the time for a concession to set up an electric plant—another first in this part of the region. Writing in 1914, the Daily Consular and Trade Reports of the U.S. Department of Commerce and Labor announced that the government of Lebanon was making plans to connect its seat in Baabda, above Beirut, to major cities across the country, thanks to a 150 miles of cables on metal posts. In December 1921, the French mandate authorities granted the concession for radio-electric communication to the Compagnie Générale de Télégraphie sans Fil (CSF), authorized to build in Khalde a radio-electric transmission station connected to Radio France. The following year, in December 1922, the CSF established Radio-Orient to run said concession in Lebanon and Syria. Lebanon became a member state of the International Telecommunication Union (ITU) in 1924, as France proceeded to separate the two countries from one another.

=== The prewar boom ===
Starting in the 1950s, an economically affluent Lebanon started investing in developing its telephone network by installing automatic exchanges, not least in partnership with Ericsson, which assumed a key role in the following decades. (Ericsson had long been a pioneer in telecommunications in the Arab world, setting up the first telephone lines in Istanbul and Cairo in the 1890s.) In May 1954, the telephone system was modernized with the introduction of the automatic dialing system. Around that time, Lebanon counted just over 27,000 telephones, massively concentrated in its capital city, Beirut. By 1957, demand for telephone services outpaced supply, as seen in the contracts signed with Ericsson, to expand the network with 25,000 new lines in the country's main cities, and with Siemens, to build a state-of-the-art radio transmission station. At the end of the 1960s, Lebanon was planning to extend the telephone network to all rural regions across the country. Meanwhile, Lebanon pioneered the Telex system in the Arab world, introducing it in 1962. In 1969, Lebanon set up in Arbaniyeh its first satellite earth station, capable of handling voice conversations as well as television channels. It thus joined the global, American-led Intelsat network. This sign of progress was celebrated by the creation of a dedicated stamp issued on 25 March 1971.

Lebanon's first submarine coaxial cable, to France's Marseille, was inaugurated in 1970. Its operation and maintenance was handed over to Sodetel, a company specifically established in 1968 for the purpose of managing this cable, and co-owned by the Lebanese government (50%), France Câbles et Radio (40%) and Italcable (10%). In May 1971, a contract was awarded to connect Beirut to Egypt's Alexandria, via another submarine coaxial cable, and to Damascus via land cable and microwave transmission.

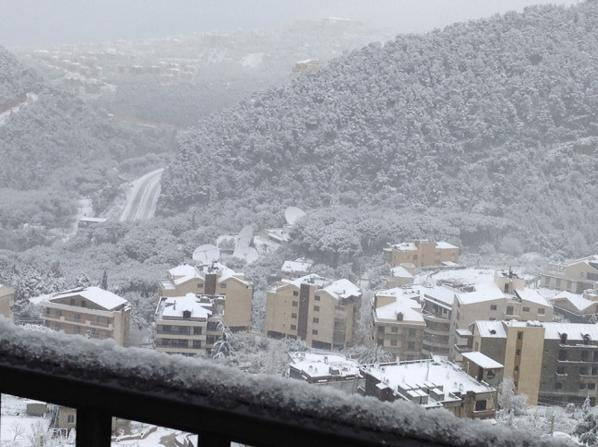
The satellite earth station in Jouret el Ballout

An interesting player during these years is the French company Radio-Orient, which continued to assume a central position in the telephone sector even after Lebanon's independence. It hosted the first international telephone services in Lebanon, in 1952, and the first Telex services, ten years later. Most importantly, the firm retained its exclusive concession over radio-electric communications with Europe and North-America. Lebanon's attempt to tax the company in 1956 led the French government to initiate a lawsuit in its defense at the International Court of Justice. It was only nationalized belatedly, in 1972: The new public entity, the Organisme de Gestion et d'Exploitation de Radio Orient, which would later be known as Ogero, then inherited Radio-Orient's de facto monopoly.

Intense investments, during this era, did not go without suspicions of foul-play, coming from Lebanese who were dissatisfied with the pace at which the country's telephone network was developing. One notable target for criticism was Tony Frangieh, who in the early 1970s was appointed Minister of Posts and Telecommunications in a government presided by his own father Suleiman.

=== The civil war's legacy ===
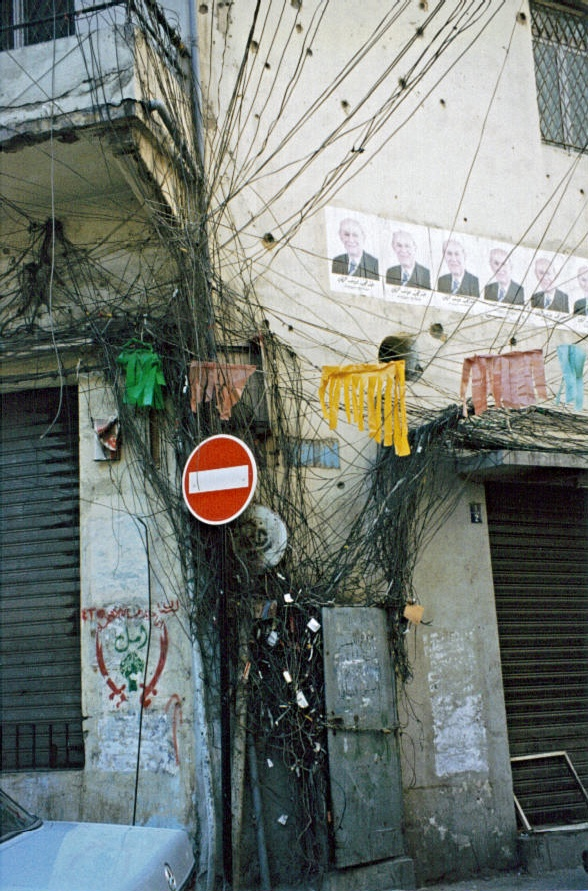
Layers of telephone cables in Beirut

The civil war that lasted from 1975 to 1990 saw a back-and-forth movement between further progress and regression. In 1976, Lebanon was a founding member of Arabsat, an intergovernmental organization delivering satellite connections to Arab states. The 1982 Israeli invasion in itself caused destruction, but also set back a U.S.-funded, $325 million plan to repair earlier damage. The two Intelsat stations Lebanon was running in Arbaniyeh were destroyed on 7 May 1983, and remained out of commission in following years. The U.S. and South Korea financed the rehabilitation of some telephone lines in 1983 and 1984. A second Intelsat satellite earth station was set up in Jouret El-Ballout in 1987, although it also seems to have been destroyed. By the end of the war, Lebanon had only an estimated 150,000 telephone lines (down from 450,000), which were unreliable.

The conflict had also ushered in a plethora of informal providers who set up telephone networks using local and international lines illegally. They became so much part of the local landscape that they acquired the nickname of "centrales", which served Lebanese citizens as public payphones. Clandestine satellite terminals also flourished; future prime minister Najib Mikati was renowned to be particularly active in this field. Meanwhile, many subscribers to the official network stopped paying their bills, in a splintering country where centralized administrations could hardly chase users anyway.

=== The postwar boom ===
After the war ended, the telephone system was rebuilt and revamped. Investcom, a subsidiary of the Mikati Group, launched in 1991 the first Advanced Mobile Phone System (AMPS). The same year, Sodetel acquired a monopoly on switching within the network, through its subsidiary Libanpac. Rehabilitating, expanding, and modernizing the infrastructure befell well-established foreign companies, namely Ericsson and Siemens, along with Alcatel, each of which was allotted a certain part of the country. The contract, tendered in 1993 and signed in March 1994, cost Lebanon $430 million and enabled the country to upgrade its telephone switching systems from an aging analogue technology to digital.

In parallel, the government moved fast to introduce the Global System for Mobile communications (GSM): Indeed, cellular phones were seen as an appealing alternative to cabled telephone. A tender for two mobile operators was launched in 1993, and the contracts awarded in June 1994, for a period of ten years (extendable by two years). The market was thus organized around a duopoly: Cellis, on one hand, was owned by France Telecom (67%) and the Mikati family's Investcom (33%); LibanCell, on the other, was somewhat less transparent about its shareholders, split between Telecom Finland International, also known as Sonera (14%), the Saudi Almabani (20%), and more anonymous Lebanese entities and investors (66%). Foremost among the latter stood Nizar Dalloul, son of the sitting minister of defense Mohsen Dalloul and a close relative of then prime minister Rafic Hariri.

LibanCell claims to have placed the very first GSM call in Lebanon, on 23 December 1994, from the Alexandre Hotel in Beirut. The World Telecommunication Development Report estimated that, by 1996, Lebanon had 200,000 cellular users already, more than any other Arab state. Two years later, they were more than 350,000.

Fixed line telecommunications services remained a monopoly in the hands of OGERO, which continued to operate all aspects of the network on behalf of the Ministry of Telecommunications, even after the 2002 telecommunications law provided for a transfer to a joint-stock company to be named Liban Telecom.

By 2009, there were 1,816,262 landlines along with 4,890,534 mobile telephones in use in Lebanon, a relatively high penetration rate for both fixed lines and mobiles.

Alfa and Touch currently share the mobile service market almost equally, providing coverage to approximately 4.7 million subscribers and offering 2G/3G/4G services through state‑run licensing frameworks. A 2025 industry report forecasts Lebanon’s telecom services market to grow at a CAGR of ~5.2 % through 2031, driven by smartphone adoption, fiber rollouts, and emerging services like IoT and mobile payments.

== Radio broadcasting ==
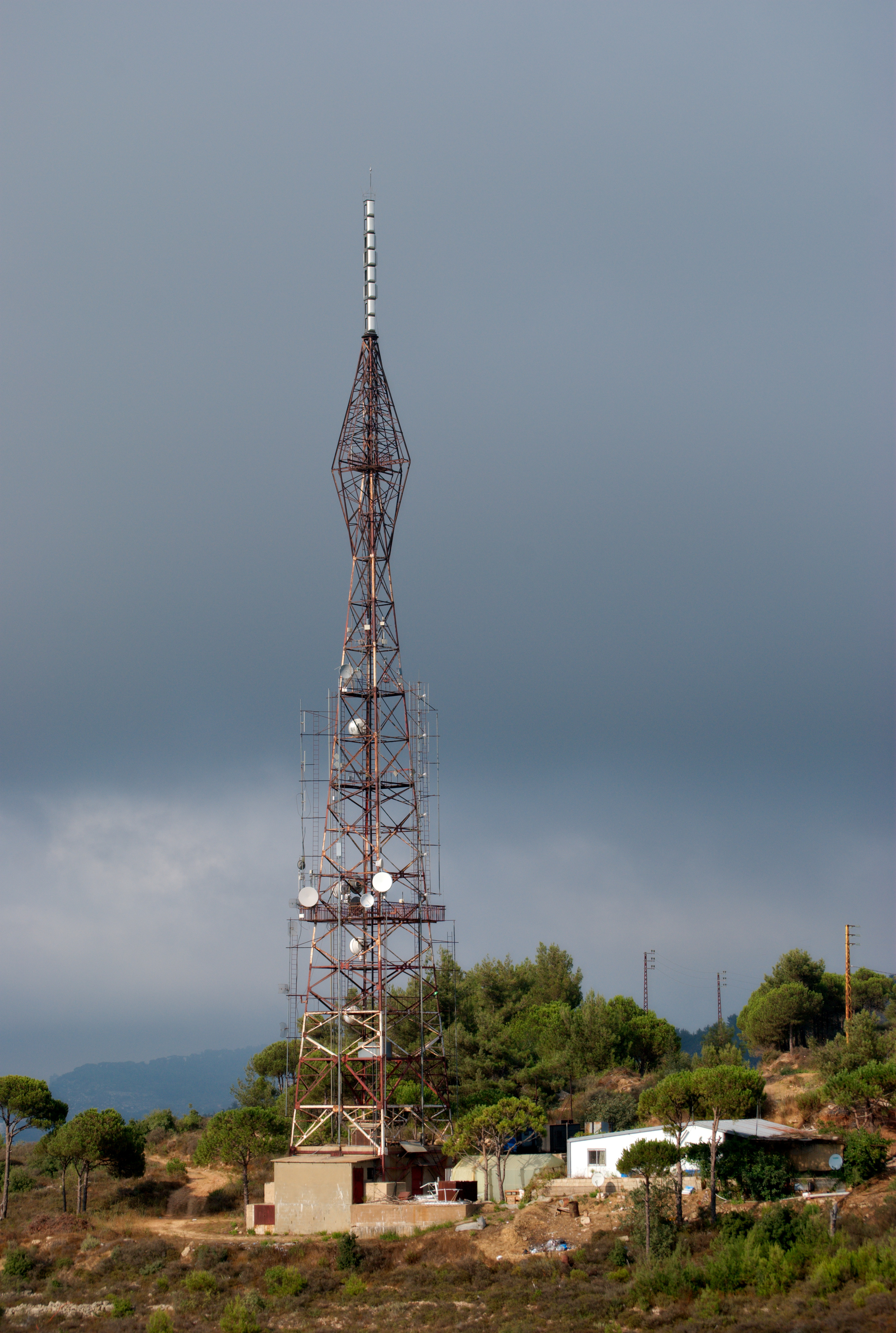
Radio mast in Mont Lebanon

Radio-Orient, which started broadcasting in 1938, was the second radio to do so in the Arab world, after Cairo. In April 1946, three years after Lebanon's independence, it became Radio Libanaise: Attached to the Ministry of News and Tourism, it was the country's first radio channel, later known as Radio Liban. In January 1958, it moved from the government's seat, at the Serail, to a new building in Senayeh, fitted with seven state-of-the-art studios built by Siemens. Radio Liban remains deeply associated, in Lebanon, with this economically prosperous yet politically tense era, not least for introducing the still lively tradition of broadcasting Feyrouz every morning, to lighten the atmosphere after the daily news.

The sector was, at the time, tightly controlled by the state, notably through decree 74 of 1953, which made licensing difficult to achieve and prohibitively expensive. By 1969, there were two licensed radio stations in Beirut, one broadcasting in Arabic and the other in French.

Voix du Liban or Voice of Lebanon, which stakes a claim to being the first commercial radio in the country, was founded in 1958 by the Christian party Phalanges, in the context of a brief spell of domestic strife. In the 1950s and 1960s, other political factions set up their own clandestine radio stations. Although the government successfully shut them down, it chose not to confiscate their equipment, paving the way to an explosion of illegal broadcasts in the more favorable context shaped by the civil war. Voix du Liban indeed resumed its activities with the start of hostilities in 1975. The same year, the Sunni faction Mourabitoun launched the Voice of Arab Lebanon. Radio Libre Liban followed in 1978, at the initiative of former president Bachir Gemayel. By 1984, each political organ had acquired a household name: radio Bachir, radio Phalanges, radio Etat (for Radio Liban), radio Walid (in reference to Druze leader Walid Jumblatt), radio Suleiman (Frangieh), etc. At the end of the war, in 1990, some 180 stations were emitting illegally in various parts of the country.

The government made a half-hearted attempt to regulate the sector, through the audiovisual media law of 1994. However, authorities implemented its regulations only partially and selectively, in ways that favored religious groups, dominant factions, and affluent businessmen. Many clandestine studios, which in any event were struggling financially, could purchase expensive licenses and chose to shut down. Others continued illegally; tellingly, in September 2002, the government took measures to close 26 unlicensed radios.

Radio remained an essential media until the arrival of internet and even beyond. In 1998 Lebanon's radio penetration rate was 906 radios per 1000 people. According to Media Landscape, there were still 2.85 million radios is Lebanon around 2016. An estimated 35 radio stations were active in 2018, of which 20 focused on politics while the others, such as Mix FM, offered entertainment only.

Radio Liban continued to run one FM station, which shifted between French, English, and Armenian, and the sole AM radio station, broadcasting solely in Arabic. Radio Lebanon also relays Radio France International at 13:00 (UTC) daily.

Among the casualties of Lebanon's post-2019 economic breakdown features Radio One, one of the most popular entertainment channels.

== Television broadcasting ==
Television broadcasting kicked off in Lebanon as a commercial enterprise from the start, initiated by businessmen Wissam Ezzedine and Joe Arida. On 9 April 1956, they signed an agreement with the government to establish the Compagnie Libanaise de Télévision (CLT). Board members included scions of some of the country's most prominent families, notably Naji Pharaon and Gaby Jabre. Capital came mostly from Syrian investors, namely Jamil Mardam-Bey and Rafik Said. The latter was the Middle-East representative for the French Compagnie Générale de Télégraphie sans Fil (CSF), which provided the equipment. The station's first stone was laid in November 1957 in Tallet al-Khayyat, on a plot of land sold by the French embassy. Its first programs were launched on 28 May 1959.

Competition came in the form of Tele-Orient, incorporated in 1960 as the Compagnie de Télévision du Liban et du Proche-Orient. Its shareholders were Lebanese bankers: Emile Boustany (Banque de l'Industrie et du Travail), Jean and Elie Abou Jaoud (Banque Libanaise pour le Commerce), and Toufic Assaf (Banque de Beyrouth et des Pays Arabes). Its official launch took place on 6 May 1962.

Both firms were granted licenses valid until 1977, and broadcast in Arabic, French, and English. By 1967, the number of television sets across the country was estimated at 170,000.

As the civil war set in, the government took the initiative to nationalize and merge CLT and Tele-Orient: In 1977, it formed Tele-Liban, a semi-public company half-owned by the state, and granted a 25-year monopoly on television broadcasting. The war also provided the country's political factions with a suitably chaotic environment in which to start their own televisions, in the absence of any mechanism to officially license more stations. The Lebanese Forces, a Christian militia, pioneered this trend in 1985, with the Lebanese Broadcasting Corporation (LBC), which soon spurred emulation from others.

Between 1988 and 1994, Tele-Liban's shares were traded by various parties, notably Rafic Hariri, who in the early 1990s bought all privately owned shares. In 1994, the Audio-Visual Media Information Law brought to an end Tele-Liban's official monopoly, while disbanding the more than 40 unlicensed and technically illegal television stations that had mushroomed during the war. The law also established the National Media Council, an advisory body in charge of overseeing the sector and monitoring content. In 1996, the state fully nationalized Tele-Liban, by buying the shares held by its private owner Rafic Hariri, who at the time was also prime minister, minister of finance, and minister of posts and telecommunications. The transaction reportedly cost $12 million. By the end of February 2001, Tele-Liban, which for years had been on the brink of bankruptcy, was shut down.

There were 37 television broadcast stations in Lebanon in 2018, although the application of the audiovisual law has caused the closure of a number of TV stations. Some of the most important television networks are the LBC, Murr TV, Al Jadeed, Future TV, Orange TV (OTV), Al-Manar, NBN, and Télé Lumière. These channels are backed by prominent families and the country's diverse political factions, without which they would struggle to survive; advertising revenues indeed would prove insufficient to support even ten of them.

Lebanon also has a cabled television market, which functions in unconventional ways. Licensed providers have dwindled over the years. CityTV, founded in 2004, seems to have gone off air around 2018. Digitek likewise appears to have disappears. In 2019, CableVision absorbed Econet, creating a monopoly on legal cable television. CableVision was rumored to be owned by GroupMed, the Hariri family holding, although it is part of the portfolio of GlobalCom Holding, one of the dominant players regarding the internet. However, the sector remains largely informal, with a plethora of unlicensed providers dominating the market.

== Internet services ==
The development and growth of the internet infrastructure has been relatively slow in Lebanon, alternating between quick adoption of new technologies and almost surreal delays. On 1 February 2019. Lebanon ranked 161 on Net Index, which rated internet speeds worldwide and has since been replaced by Speedtest. On 23 November 2021, Speedtest ranked Lebanon 160 for broadband and 82 for mobile services.

The country has shown a high internet penetration rate nonetheless. The number of Internet users was reported at 90.1% as of January 2024. Actual data, however, is patchy at best: The graph below shows the rare years since 2000 for which Lebanese authorities provided figures to the International Telecommunication Union (ITU), which is the relevant agency of the UN. Characteristically, these numbers conflict with other sources, making them difficult to validate.

Internet users (% of population)
Year	%	Source
2001	6.8	Lebanese Broadcasting International
2007	18.7	Ministry of Telecommunications
2008	22.5	Ministry of Telecommunications
2011	52.0	Presidency of the Council of Ministers
2021	78.2	Data Reportal
2024	90.1	Data Reportal

Internet services are administered in Lebanon by the Ministry of Telecommunications and the state-owned company Ogero. The easiest way to understand the country's internet is start at the source, which in Lebanon is primarily submarine cables, and move outward toward end users, which have accessed the internet through increasingly efficient technologies.

=== Submarine cables and international bandwidth ===
Lebanon is connected to the internet through three submarine fiber-optic cables, which provide the bulk of its "international bandwidth", meaning the maximum quantity of data it can transmit to or receive from the rest of the world. The three main landing points of these cables, called international exchanges or gateways, are all operated by Ogero. They are in Ras Beirut, Jdeideh, and Tripoli. Lebanon's international fiber-optic cables form two parallel systems.

- CADMOS, which started operating in September 1995, is a 230 km cable connecting landing points in Ras Beirut and Jdeideh to Pentaskhinos in Cyprus, and owned by a consortium including the Lebanese Ministry of Telecommunications. It reportedly had a capacity as low as 622 Mbit/s. It is interlinked with BERYTAR, which started operating in April 1997. This 134 km cable connects Lebanese landing points (in Saida, Ras Beirut, and Tripoli) with Tartous in Syria. It is owned jointly by the Lebanese Ministry of Telecommunications and the Syrian Establishment for Telecommunications, and officially had a capacity of 5 Gbit/s, although in 2010 Lebanon's international bandwidth was reported to be less than half of that. The Tartous landing point then connects to Pentaskhinos via the UGARIT cable (1995) and to Egypt's Alexandria via the Aletar cable (1997), which has now been replaced by Alexandros (2013).
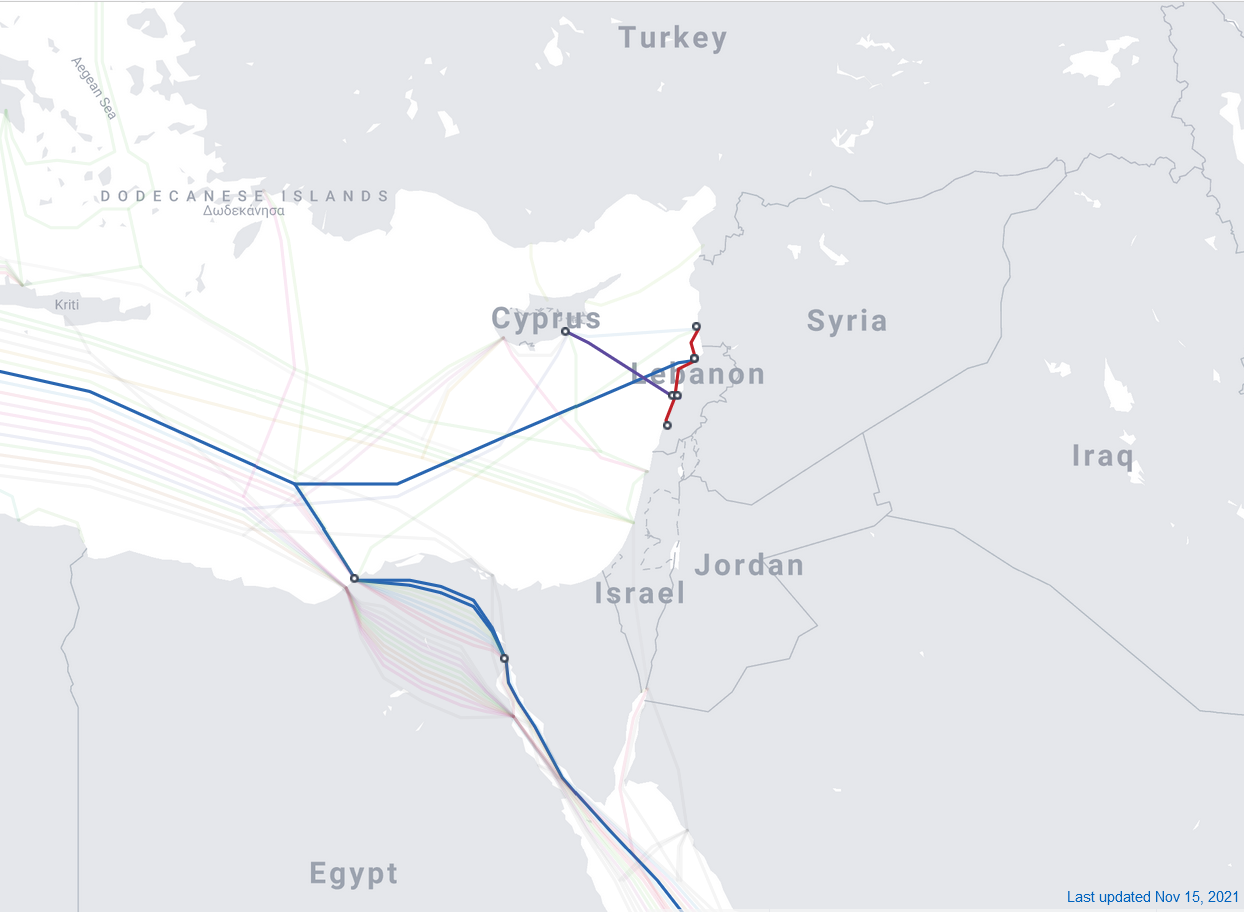
- CADMOS, BERYTAR, AND I-ME-WE
  I-ME-WE, which started operating in December 2010, is a 12,000 km cable with an overall capacity approaching 4 Tbit/s, and connecting Southern Asia with Southern Europe via the Red Sea. It is owned by a large consortium including the Lebanese operator Ogero. Its landing point in Lebanon is Tripoli, which links via I-ME-WE to Alexandria, Catania in the Italian island of Sicily, and Marseille on the French coast. When the project was launched, Lebanon was expecting to derive from it around 40 Gbit/s, multiplying its international capacity by 20. In 2011, Global Information Society Watch estimated in its annual country report that Lebanon had access to 120 Gbit/s via I-ME-WE.

External image
- Map of sea cables (zoom over Lebanon to see all cables coming to the country)

Lebanon's heavy dependence on I-ME-WE was on display in July 2012, when the country witnessed complete internet blackouts due to maintenance work on the cable which Ogero reportedly failed to announce.

This dependence is all the more acute that the other system is aging, a problem that Lebanese authorities have long been aware of. In 2011, an official at the Lebanese Ministry of Telecommunications confirmed that CADMOS would be replaced with a new cable dubbed EUROPA, which would bridge to Alexandros. This project involved a partnership with the Cyprus Telecommunications Authority (CYTA), with which an MoU was signed in 2013. EUROPA was still imminent as the decade came to a close: In June 2019, the Ministry of Telecommunications again announced plans for a new Internet submarine cable to link the country to Europe, to boost the Internet service locally, and to turn Lebanon into a hub for Internet distribution to countries in the region.

Lebanon's efforts to increase its international bandwidth are reflected in the figures local authorities have reported over the years to the International Telecommunication Union or ITU. The leap in capacity enabled by I-ME-WE in 2011 appears clearly in the data. However, the claims made in subsequent years are sufficiently inconsistent to warrant verification. Indeed, the Ministry of Telecommunications has published data in its official documents that contradicts the information it submitted in parallel to the ITU. For example, in its "Daring progress" vision of 2015, the Ministry put the country's international bandwidth in 2012 and 2013 at 12.2 and 26.8 Gbit/s respectively.

International bandwidth (Gbps)
Year	Bandwidth	Source
2007	0.93	Ministry of Postal Services and Telecommunications
2009	1.82	Ministry of Telecommunications
2010	2.5	Telecommunications Regulatory Authority
2011	12.5	Ministry of Telecommunications
2012	52.5	Ministry of Telecommunications
2013	52.5	Ministry of Telecommunications
2014	89	Ogero
2015	153	Ministry of Telecommunications
2016	85	Ministry of Telecommunications
2017	130	Ministry of Telecommunications
2018	190	Ministry of Telecommunications
2019	220	Ministry of Telecommunications
2020	320	Ministry of Telecommunications

Even as officially reported, Lebanon's increase in international bandwidth has not helped the country significantly improve its ranking on a global scale, despite the government's repeated pledges to "catch up" with the rest of the world.

=== Lebanon's internet backbone ===
Through its network of central offices, the state-owned company Ogero provides the "backbone" telecommunication infrastructure which distributes internet capacity throughout the country. The actual distribution occurs via Data Service Providers (DSPs) and Internet Service Providers (ISPs). Ogero also doubles up as an ISP.

In 1996, as postwar reconstruction was still in full swing. Lebanon started laying into the ground its core fiber-optic network, starting in Beirut. In 2001, Ericsson laid approximately 2000 km of fiber-optic cables to create a high-speed backbone network. Up to 2010, Lebanon's backbone relied mainly, however, on fixed lines in a traditional "public switched telephone network" (PSTN). Only in 2010 did the Ministry of Telecommunications start setting up a fiber-optic transmission network connecting central stations around the country, at a cost of $166 million. Its design included two super-rings and 30 sub-rings representing 4,400 km of cables. The need for a more robust backbone had been made more salient by disruptions incurred during the 2006 war with Israel. The up-haul was officially completed in April 2013. However, two years later, in April 2015, only one sub-ring had actually been turned on. By 2017, fiber-optic cables finally connected approximately 300 central offices, from which the internet could reach end-users over traditional copper cables.

=== Dial-up internet ===
The very first internet services were pioneered by the American University in Beirut, which started in 1991 to set up the first internet node in the country. What was known as AUBnet became active in 1993. The network was then expanded to encompass other institutions, within the Lebanese Academic and Research Network (LARN), built around AUBnet as its main node. By 1995, Lebanon was officially connected to the internet, at which point dial-up internet was introduced as a commercial service. The first firm on the market, Compuserve, would charge subscribers $60 per hour. In 1996, 14 kbit/s dial-up services cost around $75 a month for a 15-hour plan. Despite high prices, by 1998 Lebanon already had 40,000 subscribers to internet services, representing almost half of all internet users throughout the Arab world.

=== Ethernet internet ===
In 2001, in collaboration with Ericsson, Ogero rolled out the first Ethernet metropolitan area network, making internet accessible through dedicated cables. By 2005, it claimed to cover 95% of the country, an assertion that seemed wildly exaggerated.

=== DSL internet ===
Although Lebanon had been the first Arab state to introduce the internet, it was among the last, in 2006, to provide Digital Subscriber Lines (DSL), which enable users to transmit digital data over regular telephone lines. Faster technologies followed suit: Asymmetric Digital Subscriber Lines (ADSL) were offered for the first time in April 2007, and were partially upgraded High-bit-rate Digital Subscriber Lines (HDSL) in 2009. When it finally materialized, the launch of ADSL had been "imminent" for over five years. The roll-out also was sluggish: By October 2009, Ogero had installed ADSL only in 86 of its central offices, out of a goal of 210. Two years later, the number had only crawled up to 98. Ogero central offices have long suffered from a weak capacity to provide satisfying internet services to end-users. For example, in 2015, only 78 such centrals were equipped with Very-high-speed Digital Subscriber Lines (VDSL).

Another break on internet access was poor cooperation between providers. In the absence of a law clearing organizing how infrastructure (notably ducts) should be shared, each internet service provider had to build their own, redundant, local networks to connect the backbone to end users. Poorer or remote areas were inevitably at a disadvantage, and enticed to resort to illegal providers. Even where the law did spell things out, enforcement was lax. For instance, service providers were compelled, per the 2002 law, to establish interconnections to speed up the exchange of data between users on their respective networks. But when the Beirut Internet Exchange was created in this spirit, setting a positive precedent, Ogero refused to join.

Popular adoption of DSL technologies was nonetheless almost instantaneous: There were, as of July 2011, 1,284,361 subscribers. Prices for ADSL varied slightly depending on provider, but typically cost from $16 per month (4 Mbit/s) to $65 per month (open speed) on unlimited data plans. Decree 6297 of September 2011 decreased ADSL prices.

=== Broadband wireless internet ===
Just as cellular phones were introduced in the 1990s to make up for a degraded cable network, wireless internet services were offered for the first time in 2005 to palliate for an absent DSL infrastructure. The microwave WiMAX technology was launched in 2007. Wireless ISP fees revolved around $45 per month. Download rates ranged between 2 and 9 Mbit/s depending on the chosen plan.

The country's two mobile phone operators launched 3G services in November 2011. Starting in May 2013, Alfa and MTC Touch also introduced 4G data services in mostly dense urban regions. Such progress was followed by repeated, unfulfilled pledges to cover Lebanon's territory entirely. As part of the Lebanon Broadband 2020 plan, full 4G coverage was expected by 2018.

By the time Lebanon's economy crashed, in 2019, public Wi-Fi and 5G internet were commercially available only across Beirut International Airport terminals. The initial plan of installing Wi-Fi in public parks thus never materialized.

=== Fiber-optic internet ===
In March 2007, Solidere, the Lebanese company for the development and reconstruction of the Beirut Central District, deployed a Broadband Network in partnership with Orange Business Services. Orange operates this IP network using a fiber-optic backbone with dual connection to each building in the city center. Under its unified communication network, Solidere provides IPTV services to all its residents operated and monitored from the network main operation center.

The Beirut Digital District (BDD) was launched in September 2012 as a government-facilitated project with broadband internet and telephone infrastructure facilities. The BBD was designed to become a hub for creative companies and talents. The project aimed to improve the digital industry in Lebanon by providing, at competitive rates, state-of-the-art infrastructure, superior support services for businesses, and a living environment suited to a young and dynamic workforce.

In 2013, the Minister of Telecommunications Nicolas Sehnaoui claimed that 4,700 km of fiber optic network were being deployed across Lebanon, linking 300 fixed central offices with thousands of Active Cabinets being installed with the last mile using copper connections, allowing subscribers to reach a connection speed of 4 Mbit/s and more at home. The backbone FO network consist of 13 rings and was reportedly almost complete. At the time, experts said that Lebanon should have much faster Internet thanks to the international capacity cables, only a small fraction of which was being used in Lebanon.

On 1 July 2015, the Ministry of Telecommunications, then under Boutrous Harb, launched a five-year plan called "2020 Digital Telecom Vision". The plan aimed both to ramp up the country's 4G capacity and to replace Lebanon's aging copper network with fiber-optic cables. By 2020, it was expected to present users with VDSL2+ plans capable of offering speeds reaching 150 Mbit/s, and ensure that the majority of Lebanese population would have access to a full range of services (FTTH, IPTV, video conferencing).

The Fiber to the Home/Fiber to the Office scheme is being deployed in a phased approach in Lebanon under the management of the Ministry of Telecommunications and Ogero (the fixed network owner & maintainer). The four FTTx- phases are as follows:

– 2015–2017: FTTO Organizations SME/SM

– 2015–2020: FTTC (+VDSL) cabinets (& Houses)

– 2016–2020: FTTH1 (Houses)

– 2019–2022: FTTH2 (Houses)

In February 2018, Ogero attributed three contracts worth $283 million to three local companies (out of four bidders) to distribute fiber optics from central stations to end users: SERTA Channels, BMB, and Powertech, respectively paired with international equipment vendors Huawei, Calix, and Nokia.

Upgraded Central Offices with fibre optics GPON or P2P access technology & FTTx deployment phasing can be found on Ogero's website. Also updates are found on the Fibre Optics Lebanon Forum.

=== Internet providers ===
The first providers were licensed in 1995, namely Data Management, Terranet, Cyberia, and Libanpac.

There is an extraordinary wide range of ISPs (Internet Services Providers) and DSPs (Data Service Providers) operating in Lebanon. Per the Telecommunications Regulatory Authority, which theoretically grants licenses, there were 24 ISPs in 2009. By 2020, they were 114, although the vast majority of them did not even sport a functioning website. Lebanon does not publish data on the various ISPs' and DSPs' market shares, which makes it difficult to rank them. On second looks, however, the market appears dominated by a relatively small cluster of operators.

- Ogero distributes internet to all providers, while acting as the dominant ISP itself.
- Sodetel was founded in 1968 as the Société de Développement des Télécommunications du Liban, and is now jointly owned by the Lebanese government and the French telecom company Orange. Sodetel entered the ISP market in 1996. It is also present on the market through Libanpac, a subsidiary it launched in 1991.
- GlobalCom, a holding founded in 1998 and itself a subsidiary of Holcom, founded in 1967, owns a variety of brands. These include Cyberia and IDM, two of the leading ISPs. Cyberia, founded in 1996, bought the ISP Transmog and was acquired by Rafic Hariri's Oger Telecom in 1999. IDM was born in 2002 from the merger of IncoNet and Data Management, which were among the three first ISPs in Lebanon, along with Terranet. Data Management was founded in 1984, and in 1995 was one of the first companies to provide commercial internet services. IncoNet was founded in 1995. A related trademark is GlobalCom Data Services, founded in 1992 as a DSP. GlobalCom originally came from a merger between ATG Group and the Mikati Group.
- Cable One is a DST and a sister company of TerraNet, one the leading ISPs, founded in 1998. Both were long run by the same CEO. Cable One is owned by the Comium Group, founded in 1994 by Nizar Dalloul, the main shareholder of LibanCell. Cable One started operating in Lebanon in 1997 and was licensed in 1999.
- Cedarcom, a DSP founded in 1997, was acquired in 2003 by MEA Telecom. It owns Mobi and Lynx, two ISPs founded in 1999. I also owns Broadband Plus and Python Telecom, established respectively in 2006 and 2009. MEA Telecom also bought DST New Com and its sister ISP Fiberlink Networks, which entered the market in 1999.
- Pesco Telecom, founded in 1993, is owned by the Debbane Saikali group and operates as a DSP. It stands behind Moscanet, founded in 1997, and which also runs the trademark Wise.
- Mada, a telecommunications provider established in 2004, bought in 2009 the DSP Waves. It launched the ISP Connexions in 2013, and also owns the ISP Connect.

Other notable players include:

- Data Consult, founded in 1991
- Keblon, founded in 2004
- Lebanon Online
- Masco Group, founded in 2007
- SatMENA, a previously unknown company that became the first ISP licensed to provide satellite internet, hosted alongside government infrastructure at Jouret El-Ballout and via OGERO
- SME, founded in 2018
- Solidere, founded in 1994
- Tri Network Consultants, established in 2000 as TRINEC, and which has since become Capital Outsourcing
- Virtual-ISP (VISP), founded in 2004 as a joint-stock company

Not only most service providers fail to maintain a website, even those that do rarely update it. Worse, they do not publish terms of service or privacy policies, clarifying what they do with the internet usage data they collect on their clients. OGERO is no exception.

== The post-2019 breakdown ==
Since its inception, Lebanon's telecommunications systems have serviced certain areas far better than others. The notion of universal service, which stands for equal access to telecommunications, was introduced conceptually in 2008 but never followed through. In 2016, when residents in the capital could start dreaming of lightning-speed, fiber-optic connections, 300 villages in Keserwan, Batroun, Nabatiyeh, and the Bekaa had no access to the internet whatsoever, due to the absence of a fixed telephone network. Mobile phone outages were frequent in remote areas, not least due to power cuts.

The outbreak of Lebanon's economic crisis, in 2019, only reinforced the sector's preexisting traits. Telecommunication services soon started fraying in peripheral areas. By mid-2020, disruptions were sufficiently frequent and widespread for a local NGO, SMEX, to attempt to map them systematically. January 2021 saw major outages in Nabatiyeh and Aley. The even extended to central neighborhoods of Beirut, although this appeared to be at least in part a negotiations tactic of Ogero, in negotiating more resources from the government.

== Timeline ==
1959-6-12: Decrees 126 and 127 establish the General Directorate of Posts and Telegram and the General Directorate of Telephone. Most importantly, they organize and formalize the state's monopoly over all telecommunication infrastructure.

1980-5-17: Law 11 changes the name of the Ministry of Posts and Telegram and Telephone to Ministry of Posts and Telecommunications.

1983-9-15: Decree 100 establishes a publicly owned company to manage the telecommunication sector. It is not implemented, allegedly due to the war.

1992: The Lebanese Council for Development and Reconstruction (CDR) publishes a plan for rebuilding and modernizing the telecom infrastructure in Lebanon, which is presented as one of the government's key priorities.

1993-5-13: Lebanon issues law 218 authorizing the Lebanese government to launch a tender to introduce GSM services to the country.

1993-5-13: The mobile phone company LibanCell is established by Lebanese businessman Nizar Dalloul and Telecom Finland International, "with the vision of bringing GSM communications to every Lebanese household".

1994-8-14: The mobile phone company Cellis is formed as a joint venture between France Telecom Mobile International and the Mikati Group. It is then known as France Telecom Mobile Liban (FTML) or Mobile Interim Company 1 (MIC1). MIC1 was taken over by Orascom in 2009.

1998-10: Lebanon's postal services are privatized and handed over to LibanPost, company established on 25 August 1998. Ce decision sparked some controversy.

1999-12-27: Law 140, also known at the Telecommunication Interception Act, creates a legal framework for the interception by government agencies of private communications, setting a precedent in the Arab world. The government, however, did not formally adopt the law until a decade later, in 2009.

2000-5: The Ministry of Posts and Telecommunications published the Telecommunications Act, which lay the groundwork for reorganizing the sector.

2000-10: The five-year plan "Program for the rehabilitation of the telecommunication network in Lebanon and its development" is published, with a budget of $786 million.

2002-7-23: Lebanon issues law 431, creating the governance framework needed to organize the telecommunications sector. In particular, the law established the Telecommunications Regulatory Authority (TRA), meant to liberalize the sector and oversee a more competitive environment. The TRA only started its work five years later, when its board members were finally appointed in February 2007. Law 431 also established OGERO as an entity independent from the Ministry of Telecommunications, and reporting directly to the cabinet of ministers.

2004-12-2: The Lebanese cabinet approves the decrees enabling the creation of the TRA, along with the creation of Liban Telecom, a joint stock company meant to initiative the privatization of Ogero.

2007-12: The Beirut Internet Exchange is launched, and is the first Internet Exchange Point (IXP) in the country. An IXP enables ISPs to carry each other's packets to their destination, to improve the overall quality of service. The Beirut Internet Exchange was joined on inception by ten Lebanese ISPs, although not the main provider, namely Ogero.

2009-4: The so-called Barouk affair exposes the practice among ISPs of illegally acquiring international bandwidth, in this case through micro-wave transmission from Cyprus and Israel. This illegal station reportedly also relied on equipment smuggled in from Israel.

2011-3: The uprisings spreading across the Arab world trigger in Lebanon a wave of activism documenting and denouncing the country's laggard internet services. The most notable groups involved were Flip the Switch, Lebanese Want Fast Internet, and Ontornet, which translates as "in-waiting-net".

2011-8-23: The cabinet of ministers passes a decree to set the minimum speed acceptable for Internet services to 2 Mbit/s, in addition to lowering the prices.

2018-3-26: The Ministry of Telecommunications emits three new licenses to three operators, namely Connect, GlobalCom Data Services, and TriSat, to provide fiber-to-the-home (FTTH) services.

2020-10-1: The Lebanese government officially requests that a private individual continue to manage, as a temporary solution, the .lb extension also known as a country code top-level domain. Virtually all government websites depend on this domain, which has been managed through "temporary" arrangements since its registration in 1993.
