= Ogero =

Fixed infrastructure operator in Lebanon

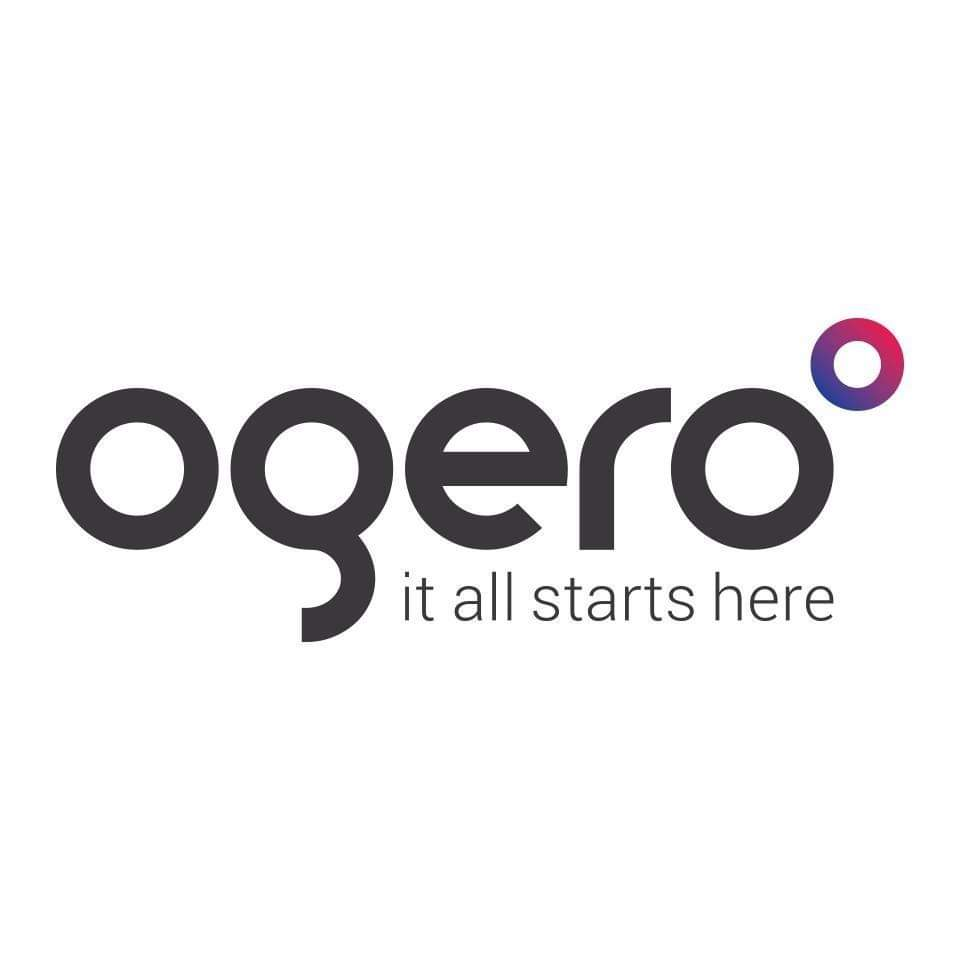
- Industry: Telecommunications
- Founded: 1972; 54 years ago
- Headquarters: Beirut, Lebanon
- Area served: Lebanon
- Key people: Ahmad Oueidat (Chairman)
- Website: ogero.gov.lb

External image
- Map of sea cables (zoom over Lebanon to see all cables coming to the country and managed by Ogero)

Ogero (or OGERO), which stands for "Organisme de Gestion et d'Exploitation de l'ex Radio Orient" (in French) is the fixed infrastructure operator in Lebanon, delivering voice and broadband internet and data services to residential and Enterprises. It was founded by the Lebanese state in 1972. The company's head office is located in Beirut. The current Chairman is Ahmad Oueidat.

The I-ME-WE (India-Middle East-Western Europe) submarine communications cable system was funded by a consortium of 9 companies from across the world including Ogero. The I-ME-WE cable system comprises three optical fiber cable pairs and 2 trunk lines. It has been operational since 2009 with Tripoli, Lebanon being connected in November 2011.

In July 2018, Ogero enabled Internet Protocol version 6 (IPv6) support for DSL users and for private operators.

On 5 November 2019, during the 2019–20 Lebanese protests, protesters in Nabatieh, shut down Ogero office despite state-exerted political pressure towards the protesters in this region.

On 12 March 2020, the government announced that internet service through Ogero would be boosted through the end of April, to encourage users to stay home to protect themselves from the coronavirus pandemic.

Through its network of central offices, the state-owned company Ogero provides the "backbone" telecommunication infrastructure which distributes internet capacity throughout the country. The actual distribution occurs via Data Service Providers (DSPs) and Internet service providers (ISPs). Ogero also doubles up as an ISP. Ogero distributes internet to all providers, while acting as the dominant ISP itself.

Former logo from 2014.

== Speed ==
As of July 2025, the fixed broadband speed provided by Ogero is ranked 141 out of more than 190 countries according to Speedtest.net. The average speed is 16.44 Mbps down and 13.56 Mbps up.

== See also ==
- Lebanon
- Telecommunications in Lebanon
- Official website
