= Europe India Gateway =

Submarine telecommunications cable system

Europe India Gateway (EIG)
- Owners: 18 companies
- Landing points: Bude, UK; Sesimbra, Portugal; Gibraltar; Marseille, France; Monaco; Tripoli, Libya; Alexandria, Egypt then overland to Suez, Egypt, then submarine again; Jeddah Saudi Arabia; Djibouti; Muscat, Oman; Fujairah, United Arab Emirates; Mumbai, India
- Total length: 15,000 km
- Design capacity: 3.84 terabits per second
- Date of first use: February 2011; 14 years ago

Europe India Gateway (EIG) is a submarine communications cable system that connects the U.K., Portugal, Gibraltar, Monaco, France, Libya, Egypt, Saudi Arabia, Djibouti, Oman, United Arab Emirates, and India.

== Organization and owners ==
The EIG is approximately 15,000 kilometres long. It was initially designed to deliver up to 3.84 terabits per second but was upgraded in 2015 and 2020. The cable system was built by both Alcatel-Lucent and TE Subcom (formerly known as Tyco) and was scheduled to be completed in the second quarter of 2010. The cable cost $700 million to build, going live in 2011. The EIG was the first direct high-bandwidth optical fibre system from Britain to India.

The investors in EIG was a consortium of 18 telecoms big companies, including.

== Cable landing points ==
EIG has cable landing points at:

- Bude, UK
- Sesimbra, Portugal
- Gibraltar
- Marseille, France
- Monaco
- Tripoli, Libya
- Alexandria, Egypt then overland to Suez, Egypt, then submarine again
- Jeddah Saudi Arabia
- Djibouti
- Muscat, Oman
- Fujairah, United Arab Emirates
- Mumbai, India

In February 2020, Ciena announced it had completed a major upgrade to the cable to boost capacity for international business traffic, adding 24.3 Tbit/s of information carrying capacity, with a spectral efficiency increase of 52%. The EIG can now transport up to 400 Gbit/s per wavelength, driving more capacity per channel at longer distances.

== Outages and incidents ==
In March 2013, the EIG cable was cut near Egypt. A few days later the I-ME-WE and SEA-ME-WE 4 cable was also cut near Egypt, supposedly by divers.

In February 2018, The Sunday Times reported that the infrastructure for the UK landing site of the Apollo, GLO-1 and Europe India Gateway cables had been found almost entirely unprotected. Their reporter was able to reach the premises without being challenged, and found the door to the generator room unlocked and left ajar. Vodafone, who manage the facility, said that he had not reached critical equipment and "would not have been able to interrupt the operation of the facility."

== See also ==
Other cable systems following a substantially similar route are:

- FLAG Europe Asia
- I-ME-WE
- SEA-ME-WE 3
- SEA-ME-WE 4
