= 2006 Hengchun earthquakes =

Earthquakes and tsunami near Taiwan

- Location within Taiwan
- UTC time: Doublet earthquake:
- A: 2006-12-26 12:26:21
- B: 2006-12-26 12:34:15
- ISC event
- A: 11123554
- B: 11123555
- USGS-ANSS
- A: ComCat
- B: ComCat
- Local date: December 26, 2006
- Local time
- A: 20:26
- B: 20:34
- Magnitude
- A: 7.0 M_{w}
- B: 6.9 M_{w}
- Depth: 10 km (6.2 mi)
- Epicenter: 21.82°N 120.61°E
- Areas affected: Taiwan
- Max. intensity: MMI VIII (Severe)
- Tsunami: Yes
- Aftershocks: 5.5 mb Dec 26 at 12:40; 5.6 M_{w} Dec 27 at 2:30
- Casualties: 2 dead; 42 injured

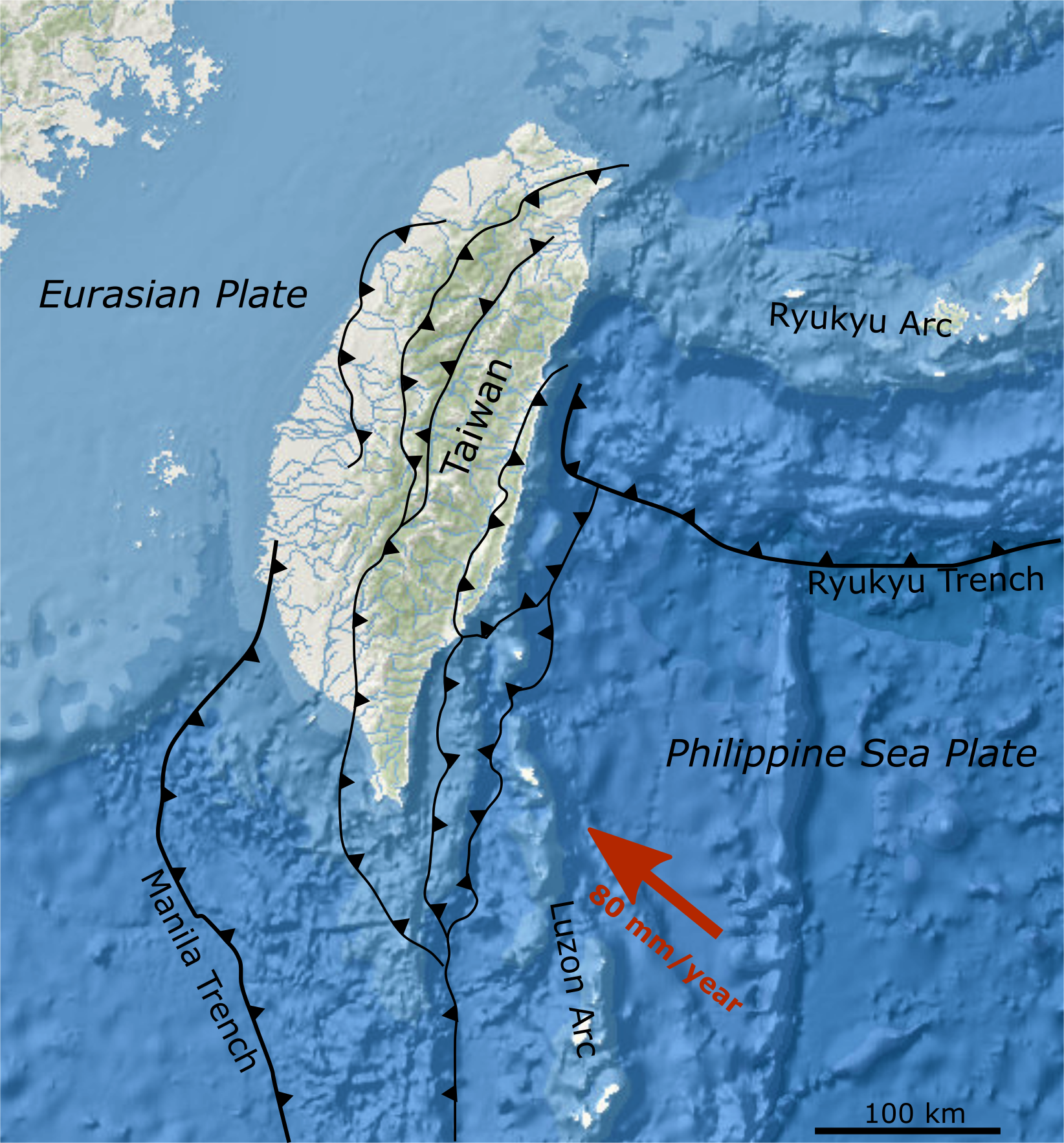
Main tectonic boundaries onshore and offshore Taiwan

The 2006 Hengchun earthquakes occurred on December 26 at 20:26 and 20:34 local time off the southwest coast of Taiwan in the Luzon Strait, which connects the South China Sea with the Philippine Sea. The International Seismological Centre measured the shocks at 7.0 and 6.9 on the moment magnitude scale. The earthquakes not only caused casualties and building damage, but several submarine communications cables were cut, disrupting telecommunication services in various parts of Asia.

== Tectonic setting ==
Taiwan lies in a zone of complex interaction between the Philippine Sea plate (PSP) and the Eurasian plate (EP). To the north, the PSP is subducting beneath the EP along the line of the Ryukyu Trench, forming the Ryukyu Volcanic Arc. To the south, in contrast, the EP is subducting beneath the PSP along the line of the Manila Trench, forming the Luzon Volcanic Arc. At its northern end the Luzon Arc is colliding with the continental margin of the Eurasian plate as the thicker and more buoyant crust enters the subduction zone. This zone of collision is propagating southwards and the Hengchun Peninsula marks the early stages of this process.

== Earthquake sequence ==
The sequence began with the first major earthquake at 12:26:21 (UTC), followed slightly less than eight minutes later by the second main shock at 12:34:15. The first event had a focal mechanism indicating rupture along a normal fault, probably within the descending oceanic crust of the Eurasian plate as it bends within the subduction zone. Relocated aftershocks are consistent with a moderately west-dipping normal fault, with an estimated rupture area of 50 km x 35 km. The second event has a strike-slip focal mechanism, probably on a steep NNW–SSE trending, WSW-dipping fault, with an estimated rupture area of 65 km x 30 km. The two rupture areas show little overlap and the second event is likely to have been triggered by stress transfer from the first event. The largest aftershock had a similar mechanism to the second main shock.

== Damage ==
=== Taiwan ===
News agencies aired reports in southern Taiwan of collapsed houses, building fires, hotel guests being trapped in elevators, and telephone outages due to severed lines. Two people were reported killed and 42 injured. The earthquake was felt all over Taiwan, including the capital Taipei, 450 km (280 mi) north of Hengchun.

Power was knocked out to a reported 3,000 homes, but service was restored within a few hours. As of the following morning, cleanup was already underway.

Fifteen historical buildings, including a Grade 2 elephant site, were damaged in the historic center of Hengchun.

The nearby Maanshan Nuclear Power Plant was affected by the earthquake. Because of the vigorous vibration, the alarm at Reactor #2 was activated, forcing the operators to carry out SCRAM immediately. However, Reactor #1 was not affected and remained operational. After the emergency shutdown of Reactor #2, engineers checked the plant facilities and no problems were found.

=== Hong Kong and Macau ===
Residents in different districts of Hong Kong felt the earthquake. Fearing the collapse of their buildings, people in Sham Shui Po, Wong Tai Sin and Yuen Long ran into the streets. The Hong Kong Observatory estimated the tremor as having a Mercalli intensity of III (Weak) to IV (Light). In Macau, residents called the Office for Meteorological and Geophysical Services to ask whether an earthquake had occurred in their city.

=== China ===
There were no reports of major damage in China, although the quake was felt there. In Xiamen, people evacuated their homes and offices to open spaces. The earthquake was also felt in various cities in Guangdong and Fujian provinces, including in Guangzhou, Shenzhen, Shantou, and Fuzhou.

== Tsunami ==
While this earthquake marked the first time a tsunami was detected in Taiwan, the change in water level was only 25 cm (9.8 in) and no damage was caused. Early reports issued by the Japan Meteorological Agency indicated that the earthquake triggered a 1-meter tsunami, which was detected heading for the east coast of the Philippines, with Basco in its likely path. The Hong Kong Observatory also issued tsunami information bulletin, while indicating Hong Kong would likely be unaffected.

== Disruption in communications ==
The earthquake catastrophically disrupted Internet services in Asia, affecting many Asian countries. Financial transactions, particularly in the foreign exchange market were seriously affected as well. The aforementioned disruption was caused by damage to several submarine communications cables.

=== Taiwan ===
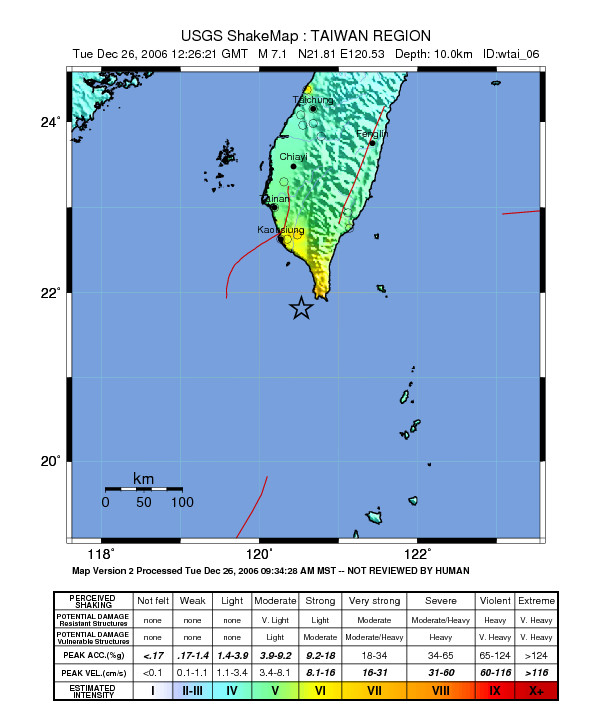
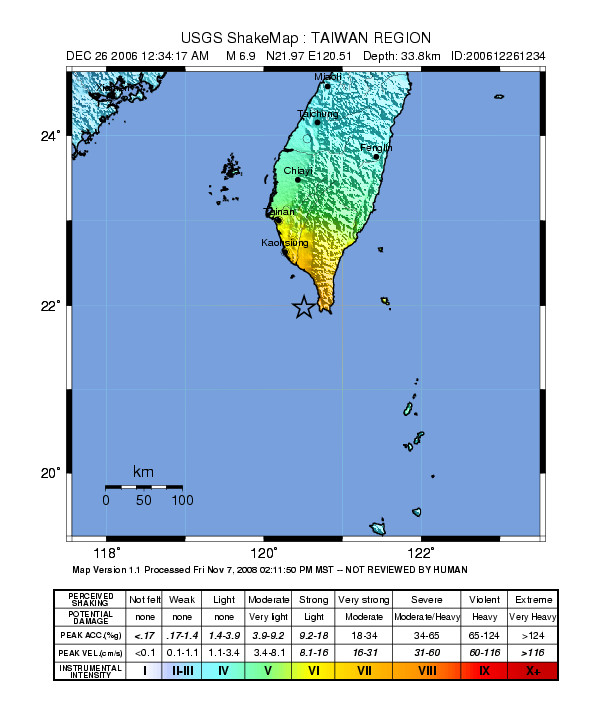
USGS ShakeMaps showing locations and similar intensity patterns

Chunghwa Telecom stated that an undersea cable off the southern coast had been damaged, interrupting communications (including IDD, telephone services and internet services) of Taiwan with China, Hong Kong, Malaysia, Singapore, Thailand, and the United States. The international calling capacity was reduced to 40%.

=== China ===
China Telecom reported that several international submarine communications cables had been broken, including:

- CUCN and SMW3, which was damaged on 26 December 2006 20:25 UTC+8 approximately 9.7 km away from landing point in Fangshan, Pingtung County, Taiwan;
- APCN 2 S3, which was damaged on 27 December 2006 02:00 UTC+8 approximately 2,100 km away from landing point in Chongming, Shanghai, China;
- APCN 2 S7, which was damaged on 27 December 2006 00:06 UTC+8 approximately 904 km away from landing point in Tanshui, Taipei County (now New Taipei City), Taiwan;
- FLAG Europe Asia, the segment between Hong Kong and Shanghai was severed on 27 December 2006 04:56 UTC+8;
- FLAG North Asia Loop, the segment between Hong Kong and Pusan was severed on 26 December 2006 20:43 UTC+8, severely damaging the communications within the Asia-Pacific region and with the United States and Europe.

IDD, telephone services, and internet services of China with North America were seriously affected by the earthquake. However, China Telecom announced on December 31 that IDD services had resumed to normal levels. Internet services had resumed to 70% of normal levels. As the undersea cables to North America were seriously damaged by the earthquake, the quality of internet services depended on the progress of repair work.

=== Hong Kong ===
Starting from dawn on 27 December, connections between foreign websites/servers and Hong Kong internet users kept failing. Wikipedia, search engines, online messengers like ICQ and MSN Messenger, and portals like Google, Yahoo and MSN were largely unavailable. Access to Chinese Wikipedia was also cut by the earthquake, as the servers are located in South Korea. Websites located in mainland China, such as xinhuanet.com, the website of Xinhua News Agency, were also inaccessible.

On 29 December, the Office of the Telecommunications Authority (OFTA) of the Hong Kong Government announced that IDD and roaming calls to Taiwan had resumed to 50% of the normal level. IDD and roaming calls to other Asian countries (e.g. South Korea) were slower than normal. Calls from Hong Kong to overseas using calling cards experienced the same situation as the IDD and roaming calls. However, calling from overseas to Hong Kong using calling cards still faced serious congestion.

For internet services, as of December 29, connections to websites in the U.S., South Korea, Japan, and Taiwan were still very slow. However, the situation was improving; sites which could not be accessed before (e.g. Wikipedia, Google, YouTube) were available at extremely slow speeds. Among the internet service providers in Hong Kong, PCCW's Netvigator was the slowest to resume enough bandwidth for their users. Therefore, as a temporary remedy, many internet users in Hong Kong used proxy servers in Australia, Thailand, Spain, and even the UAE and Kuwait to access foreign websites.

As of 31 December, the situation of internet connection had improved. Although sites that were previously unavailable became accessible, connection speeds were still slower than normal.

=== Philippines ===
The earthquake cut PLDT's phone service capacity and connectivity by around 40 percent. The two largest Philippine mobile communications companies (Smart Communications and Globe Telecom) also reported some international connectivity problems. Some carriers were able to re-route their service. Call centers and other outsourced business processes that have become a major industry in the Philippines feared that the cable damage might hamper their operations dramatically; only two centers were totally shut down due to the problems.

=== United States ===
In the United States, several networks and bloggers experienced a noticeable reduction in the volume of spam received after the earthquake. A blogger noted that "one large network in North America saw their mail from Korea drop by 90% and from China by 99%."

=== Other areas ===
Korea Telecom, Malaysia's Telekom Malaysia and Jaring, as well as the Communications Authority of Thailand, Singapore's StarHub and SingTel and Brunei's Telbru also reported disruption to most Internet services. In Singapore, search engines and portals like Google, Yahoo, MSN and most websites were virtually unreachable. In Indonesia, Google was not accessible, but Yahoo! and Wikipedia could still be used, though the network connection speed was very slow. Sri Lankan internet services were likewise affected. In Malaysia, there were problems with popular Internet services such as Gmail and Yahoo News; however, the situation was reported to be improving on 29 December.

== Repair work ==
According to the Office of the Telecommunications Authority (OFTA) of Hong Kong Government, among the five cable ships deployed, two arrived at the scene. However, one of the two ships experienced a major fault on December 30 afternoon and was under urgent repair in Kaohsiung, Taiwan. The repair for the ship was estimated to take about a week. Therefore, the repair for the cables had to be postponed. It was estimated that the first part of the repair of one of the submarine cables would be completed around 16 January 2007. For the other damaged cables, survey and assessment were being arranged and repair of most of the cables is expected to be completed progressively by the end of January 2007. IDD services and disrupted internet service in Southeast Asia were mostly restored pending the repairs and rerouted traffic.

Before the completion of the cable repair works, however, some countries had already found alternative methods to restore internet access. For example, by 3 January 2007, Singapore's SingTel had already fully restored the Internet access provided by them. SingNet, SingTel's subsidiary, which handles ISP services, released an announcement on its homepage, mentioning that "internet access to services such as gaming and video downloading may experience some delays". Whether or not this is related to the earthquake is unknown, albeit likely.

According to China Daily on 16 January, the repair work might be completed by the end of January, yet heavy winds in the Bashi Channel stirred up 10-to-12-meter waves, which made it impossible to resume work.

== See also ==
- List of earthquakes in 2006
- List of earthquakes in Taiwan
- Manila Trench
