= Beirut Digital District =

Beirut Digital District (BDD) is a built community dedicated to creating a hub for the digital and creative industries in Lebanon. It was officially launched in September 2012 in the Bachoura district of Beirut as a government facilitated project established between ZRE s.a.l. (a private real-estate company), Berytech (an incubator accelerator for the development of startups in the ICT field), and The Ministry of Telecommunications, who acted as a facilitator and provided broadband internet and telephone infrastructure.
CNN’s Andrew Stevens called BDD the powerhouse for startups in the Middle East.

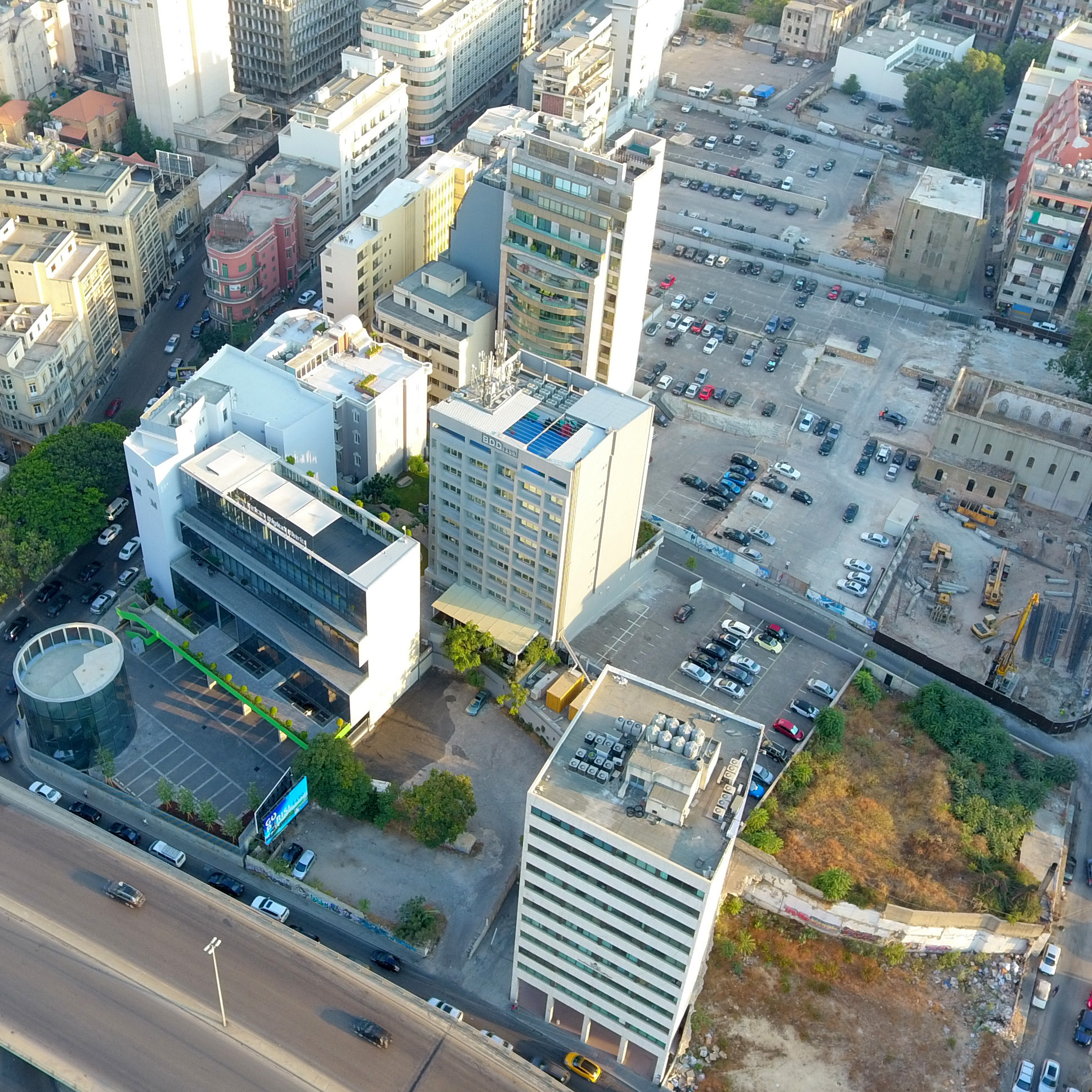
A view of BDD from above

== Location ==
Beirut Digital District is located in the Bachoura district, the center of Beirut City, Lebanon. BDD is close to the airport and seaport, about 2 minutes away from downtown, and minutes away from American University of Beirut, Lebanese American University, Saint Joseph University, École Supérieure des Affaires, and Sagesse University.

== Facilities ==
There are multiple amenities and services provided by Beirut Digital District:

- Conference and meeting rooms and audio-conference rooms
- Events and workshop spaces
- Gym and fitness classes
- Eatery and coffee shop
- Fiber optics and Wi-Fi
- Parking spaces and valet services
- HR services
- Business and legal setup services

== Phases ==
The development of Beirut Digital District has been separated into 4 phases:

=== Phase A ===
The first phase was completed in 2016. In this phase, the total build up area of BDD is 17,500 square meters dedicated to office spaces.

=== Phase B ===
This phase was completed in 2022 where BDD became a 44,500 square meter district dedicated to office spaces, with the introduction of the offices of the future in the latest two buildings.

=== Phase C ===
This phase makes BDD an 84,000 square meter district dedicated to office spaces and residential units and is due completion in 2025.

==== Phase D ====
The last phase, to be completed in 2030, will transform BDD into a 150,000 square meter district with multiple offices and residential units.
