= I-ME-WE =

Submarine communications cable system between India and France

- Owners: Consortium
- Total length: 12,091 km
- Design capacity: 5.6 Tbit/s
- Technology: DWDM
- Date of first use: 2010

I-ME-WE (India-Middle East-Western Europe) is a 12,091-kilometre (7,513 mi) submarine communications cable system linking Europe and India via the Middle East. At launch, the design capacity was 3.84 Tbit/s, but after upgrades by Mitsubishi Electric in 2016, the new design capacity was rated at 5.6 Tbit/s. The cable entered service in December 2010.

The cable consists of three fiber pairs, one of which is a terrestrial link connecting Alexandria and Suez in Egypt. The contract for construction and maintenance of the cable was awarded to Alcatel-Lucent Submarine Networks (ASN), supported by NEC as subcontractor, at a total cost of US$480 million.

== Landing points and operators ==
The IMEWE consortium comprises nine telecom companies across eight countries.

I-ME-WE Cable Landing Points
Location	Operator & Technical Partner
Marseille, France	Orange S.A
Catania, Italy	Telecom Italia Sparkle
Tripoli, Lebanon	Ogero
Alexandria, Egypt Suez, Egypt	Telecom Egypt
Jeddah, Saudi Arabia	Saudi Telecom Company
Fujairah, UAE	Etisalat by e&
Karachi, Pakistan	Pakistan Telecommunications Company Limited
Mumbai, India	Bharti Airtel Tata Communications

== See also ==
Other cable systems following a substantially similar route are:

- Europe-India Gateway (EIG)
- FLAG Europe Asia
- SEA-ME-WE 3
- SEA-ME-WE 4
- SEA-ME-WE 5
