= Internet in Pakistan =

The Internet in Pakistan has been available since the early 1990s. Pakistan has over 150 million internet users, making it the 7th-largest population of internet users in the world.

Information and communications technology (ICT) is one of the fastest growing industries in the country. In 2001 just 1.3% of the population used the Internet. By 2006 this figure had grown to 6.5% and in 2012 to 10.0%. As of July 2021; the percentage of internet users in Pakistan is 54%, which translates into approximately 118 million citizens having access to internet.

In 2015 Government of Pakistan (GoP) recognised that Telecommunication has become one of the dominant sectors in the economy, contributing to the well-being of society and a major contributor to GDP thus introduced a Telecommunication Policy 2015. The Telecom Policy 2015 aims to facilitate the attainment of an all-embracing national agenda and to transform Pakistan into an economically vibrant, knowledge-based, middle-income country by 2025.

== Statistics ==
- Internet users: 168 million broadband subscribers as of October 2026
- Fixed broadband: 4.8 million subscribers as of October 2026
- Mobile broadband: 163 million subscribers as of October 2026
- Top level domain: .pk

== Broadband ==
There are over 200 internet service providers in Pakistan. Fiber based home broadband has seen rapid adoption in Pakistan, with less than 70,000 subscribers in 2018, that number has grown to 4 million as of October 2026.

High speed broadband is offered by all major ISPs with plans ranging from 25 Mbit/s to 1 Gbit/s.

- FlashFiber (FTTH brand by PTCL)
- StormFiber (a subsidiary of Cybernet)
- Nayatel
- Transworld Home (a subsidiary of Transworld Associates)

=== Internet Backhaul ===
Pakistan maintains international connectivity through seven fiber-optic submarine communications cables, with three new cables to be added in the next 2 years.

==== Active submarine communications cables ====
Operator	Submarine cable	Installed capacity	Activated capacity	Total capacity
PTCL	AAE-1	4.77 Tbps	3.58 Tbps	7.46 Tbps
PTCL	I-ME-WE	2.76 Tbps	1.90 Tbps	7.46 Tbps
PTCL	SEA-ME-WE-4	2.58 Tbps	1.98 Tbps	7.46 Tbps
Transworld Associates	SEA-ME-WE-5	1.7 Tbps	1.7 Tbps	4.3 Tbps
Transworld Associates	TWA-1	2.8 Tbps	2.6 Tbps	4.3 Tbps
Cybernet	PEACE	1.6 Tbps	0.8 Tbps	0.8 Tbps

==== Upcoming submarine communications cables ====
The upcoming Africa-1, SEA-ME-WE-6 and 2Africa cables have been installed at their respective cable landing stations in Pakistan, however due to geopolitical instability in the Middle East caused by the Iran war, the cables are not yet active.

Operator	Submarine cable	Planned capacity
PTCL	Africa-1	6.5 Tbps
Transworld Associates	SEA-ME-WE-6	6 Tbps
Transworld Associates	2Africa	10 Tbps

==== Anti-competitive practices ====
PTCL has a history of engaging in anti-competitive practices since the early 2000s, it has been taken to court several times over predatory pricing and collusion to maintain its monopoly and force competitors out of the broadband market. In 2013, LINKdotNET, a subsidiary of Mobilink (now Jazz) was forced to shut down citing 'market conditions' and transfer all its residential DSL users to PTCL DSL.

Inadequate infrastructure and Tier-1 operators abusing their dominant position are the two primary factors adversely impacting internet speeds, encompassing technology, available backhaul, and international internet bandwidth. This is the primary reason why Pakistan's internet speeds lag behind those of neighbouring countries and even some less developed nations worldwide. With PTCL and TWA sharing a duopoly of internet backhaul by operating majority of the submarine communications cables coming in to the country, both networks engage in anti-competitive behaviour with price gouging and illegal blocking of Tier-2 ISPs that purchase bandwidth through resellers.

=== Mobile Broadband ===
In areas where fixed line broadband is not available due to poor infrastructure, LTE based mobile broadband is used. Mobile broadband crossed 100 million subscribers in April 2021.

Starting in 2019, three of the four local mobile networks began rolling out LTE-A and other technological advancements such as 256-QAM and 4x4 MIMO to cell sites across the country, as part of their efforts to improve the user experience for mobile broadband subscribers.

On 22 August 2019, Pakistan became the first South Asian country to test 5G services. The successful tests were conducted by Pakistani telecom operator Zong.

On 19 March 2026, 5G was officially launched in Pakistan, with Zong and Jazz being the first telecom companies to launch it in multiple cities throughout Pakistan.

Challenges in Digital Development

A 2025 report by the Asian Development Bank (ADB) highlights significant structural issues within Pakistan’s digital ecosystem, revealing that the country is falling behind regional and global peers in telecom modernization. Despite a telecom market valued at $4.52 billion, Pakistan continues to struggle with high taxation, limited fibre-optic expansion, and delayed policy reforms.

With over 100 countries already launching commercial 5G, Pakistan’s repeated postponement of 5G spectrum auctions and lack of investment in 3G and 4G infrastructure underscore its stagnation. Political instability and regulatory delays have further dimmed prospects for rapid digital advancement, casting a shadow over its projected growth to $5.32 billion by 2029.

== Language ==
Most Internet usage in Pakistan is still in English. Many Urdu based newspapers maintain an Urdu presence on the web, however, common usage is often done in romanized Urdu.

== Right of way draft rules 2018 ==
Major hindrance in providing internet services in Pakistan is acquiring Right of Way from public and private authorities (Owners of Right of Way) Over the last few years, there have been many instances reported to PTA and MoIT&T related to Right-of-Way (RoW) disputes. These have come from telecom operators who cite undue demands from various public bodies (owners of RoW). MoIT&T began a process of consultation with all relevant stakeholders to develop a standard mechanism for addressing the long-standing issue of RoW being faced by telecom operators and has prepared draft RoW rules. The Telecom Authority (PTA) is actively pursuing and participating in finalizing the RoW Rules in the larger interest of the telecom sector.

== E-commerce ==
Pakistan e-commerce industry is worth an estimated US$4 billion.

Pakistan's first e-commerce company was started in 2001 with the establishment of beliscity.com by Abid Beli. Since then the market has grown steadily until 2012, which was an inflection point in the industry.

In 2018, the Government of Pakistan reformulated the Digital Pakistan Policy: one that takes into account its increasingly transformed role across all sectors of socio-economic development; their accelerated digitization, and transformational modernization into integrated components of a holistic knowledge based economy. With this in mind, Ministry of IT & Telecom (MoIT) has formulated this policy document based on a multi-stakeholder model which includes infrastructure development, digitization including e-Agriculture, e-Health, e-Energy, e-Commerce, e-Justice, ICT Education, IoT, FinTech, Artificial Intelligence & Robotics, Cloud Computing and Big Data

== See also ==
- Information technology in Pakistan
- Internet censorship in Pakistan
- Pakistan Educational Research Network
- Telecommunications in Pakistan
