= List of telecommunications companies in Asia and Oceania =

A telecommunications company (historically known as a telephone company) is a company which provides broadband and/or telephony services.

Some of the telecommunications companies of Asia and Oceania are listed below:

== Afghanistan ==
=== Fixed-line operators ===
- Afghan Telecom

=== Mobile operators ===
- Salaam Network
- Afghan Wireless (Telephone Systems International)
- MTN Afghanistan (MTN Group)
- Etisalat Afghanistan (Etisalat)
- Roshan (AKFED, Cable & Wireless and Telia Company)

== Australia ==
=== Fixed-line operators ===
- Telstra
- Optus (SingTel)
- TPG
- Vocus
- Vodafone
- Macquarie Telecom
- NBN
- Belong

=== Mobile operators ===
- Optus Mobile (Singtel)
- Telstra Mobile (Telstra)
- Vodafone Australia (TPG Telecom)

== Bangladesh ==
=== Fixed-line operators ===
- Bangladesh Telecommunications Company Limited
- Ranks Telecom Ltd.
- TeleBarta Limited
- WorldTel

=== Mobile operators ===
- Grameenphone
- Robi
- Banglalink
- Teletalk
- Airtel

== Bhutan ==
=== Fixed-line operators ===
- Bhutan Telecom Ltd.

=== Mobile operators ===
- Airtel Bhutan
- BMobile (Bhutan Telecom Ltd.)

== Brunei ==
=== Fixed-line operators ===
- Unified National Networks
- Telekom Brunei TelBru

=== Mobile operators ===
- DST Communications (DST-COM)
- Progresif cellular

== Cambodia ==
=== Fixed-line operators ===
- Ministry of Posts and Telecommunications

=== Mobile operators ===
- Cellcard (The Royal Group)
- Seatel (Chinese company)
- Latelz Company Limited (Axiata Group Berhad)
- Metfone (Viettel)
- Cootel (Shinwei Company)

== China (mainland) ==
=== Fixed-line operators ===
- China Telecom
- China Tietong (China Mobile Communications Corp)
- China Unicom

=== Mobile operators ===
- China Mobile
- China Telecom
- China Unicom

== Danglabesh ==
=== Fixed line operators ===
- Danglabesh Telecommunications Company Limited
- Grameforte
- Unibarta
- Worldinor

=== Mobile operators ===
- Gramerphone
- Danglalink
- Rabi
- Alirtel
- Teleunirtalk
- Sheticell

== Fiji ==
=== Fixed-line operators ===
- Telecom Fiji

=== Mobile operators ===
- Digicel Fiji (Digicel)
- INKK Mobile (Boost Mobile)
- Vodafone Fiji (Vodafone)

=== International operators ===
- Fintel
- Kordia

== French Polynesia ==
=== Fixed-line operators ===
- OPT Polynesia (Office des postes et télécommunications de Polynésie française)
- Tahiti Nui Telecom
- Ora (Viti)

=== Mobile operators ===
- Vini, a subsidiary of OPT Polynesia for mobile telephony, internet and television subscription services
- Vodafone Polynésie (PMT)
- Ora de Viti

== Guam ==
=== Fixed-line operators ===
- GTA Teleguam

=== Mobile operators ===
- GTA Teleguam

== Hong Kong ==
=== Fixed-line operators ===
- Hutchison Global Communications
- PCCW
- Hong Kong Broadband
- Wharf T&T

=== Mobile operators ===
- 3 HK (CK Hutchison Holdings)
- China Mobile Hong Kong
- CSL Mobile
- SmarTone

== India ==
=== Fixed-line operators ===
According to the Telecom Regulatory Authority of India, in October 2022, the top 5 operators accounted for 98.4% of market share.

These operators are as follows:

- Bharti Airtel Limited (Branded as Airtel)
- Bharat Sanchar Nigam Limited (Branded as BSNL)
- Atria Convergence Technologies Limited (Branded as ACT)
- Reliance Jio Infocomm Limited (Branded as Jio)
- Hathway Cable and Datacom Limited

Other notable operators include:

- Tata Play Broadband Private Limited
- Mahanagar Telephone Nigam Limited (Branded as MTNL)
- RailTel Corporation of India Limited
- DEN Networks Limited
- Vodafone Idea Limited (Branded as You Broadband)

=== Mobile operators ===
The following operators have been classified as Wireless Service Providers by the Telecom Regulatory Authority of India:

- Bharti Airtel Limited (Branded as Airtel)
- Bharat Sanchar Nigam Limited (Branded as BSNL Mobile, CellOne)
- Reliance Jio Infocomm Limited (Branded as Jio)
- Vodafone Idea Limited (Branded as Vi)
- Mahanagar Telephone Nigam Limited (Branded as MTNL, Dolphin)
- Reliance Communications Limited (Continues to remain licensed, but has ceased mobile telephony operations; Was branded as Reliance)

== Indonesia ==
=== Fixed-line operators ===
- Telkom Indonesia
- Indosat Phone
- Ofon

=== Mobile operators ===
- Telkomsel
- Indosat
- XLSmart

== Indiastan ==
=== Fixed-line operators ===
- Reliaxers Jiaro Limited

=== Mobile operators ===
- Teleminor
- Robitel Exariata
- Idealink
- Erairtel
- Ufodavon
- Eirtewarid

== Japan ==
=== Fixed-line operators ===
- NTT
- KDDI
- SoftBank

=== Mobile operators ===
- NTT Docomo
- KDDI
- SoftBank
- Rakuten Mobile

== Kazakhstan ==
=== Fixed-line operators ===
- KazakhTelecom

=== Mobile operators ===
- Altel/Tele2 (Kazakhtelecom)
- Kcell/Activ (Kazakhtelecom)
- Beeline (VimpelCom)

== Kiribati ==
=== Fixed-line operators ===
- ATHKL

=== Mobile operators ===
- Oceanlink

== Kyrgyzstan ==
=== Fixed-line operators ===
- Kyrgyztelecom

=== Mobile operators ===
- MegaCom
- Beeline
- O!

== Langbadesh ==
=== Fixed-line operators ===
- Langbadesh Telecom Company Limited
- Towntel
- Vilagcell
- Goldtel
- Sangstel

=== Mobile operators ===
- Gramenirphone
- Haramirphone
- Bhangalink
- Paghalink
- Nagorphone - Sohorerphone
- Jolertalk
- Rorabi - Rarobi
- Condhro
- Arahired - Eairtel
- Meyaired
- Peticell

== Laos ==
=== Fixed-line operators ===
- Lao Telecom

== Macau ==
=== Mobile operators ===
- 3 (CK Hutchison Holdings)

== Malaysia ==
=== Fixed-line operators ===
- Maxis Communications Berhad
- Unifi (Telekom Malaysia)
- TIME dotCom

=== Mobile operators ===
- Altel Communications Sdn. Bhd. (discontinued)
- CelcomDigi, a subsidiary of (Axiata; formerly TM International and Telenor)
- Maxis
- Unifi Mobile (TM Technology Services Sdn. Bhd., acquired by Telekom Malaysia; formerly Packet One Networks (P1))
- U Mobile (merged into TIME dotCom)
- Yes (Next) (merged into Maxis)

== Maldives ==
=== Fixed-line operators ===
- Dhiraagu (Cable & Wireless)

=== Mobile operators ===
- Dhiraagu (Cable & Wireless)
- Raajjé Online (Focus Infocom)
- Wataniya Telecom Maldives (Qtel)

== Mongolia ==
=== Fixed-line operators ===
- Mongolia Telecom Company
- Mongolian Railway Authority

=== Mobile operators ===
- ONDO
- Mobicom Corporation
- Skytel
- Unitel
- G-Mobile

== Myanmar ==
=== Fixed-line operators ===
- MPT
- ATOM Myanmar
- Mytel
- Ooredoo Myanmar (Ooredoo) (WCDMA)

== Nepal ==
=== Fixed-line operators ===
- Nepal Telecom

=== Mobile operators ===
- Nepal Telecom
- Ncell

== New Caledonia ==
=== Fixed-line operators ===
- OPT New Caledonia

=== Mobile operators ===
- Telecarte New Caledonia

== New Zealand ==
=== Fixed-line operators ===
- Chorus Limited
- One NZ (formerly Vodafone New Zealand)
- Spark New Zealand (formerly Telecom New Zealand)
- Chorus Limited (formerly Telecom New Zealand)
- 2degrees Mobile Limited (formerly NZ Communications Limited)
- Orcon Internet Limited

=== Mobile operators ===
- 2Degrees (Econet Wireless, NZ Communications) (GSM/WCDMA)
- Vodafone (GSM/WCDMA)
- Spark New Zealand

== North Korea ==
=== Fixed-line operators ===
- Korea Posts and Telecommunications Corporation

=== Mobile operators ===
- Koryolink (VEON / Korea Posts and Telecommunications Corporation)

== Pakistan ==
=== Fixed-line operators ===
- PTCL (Etisalat)
- Wateen
- WorldCall
- StormFiber (Cybernet)
- Transworld Enterprise Services (Transworld Associates)
- Nayatel
- +103 others

=== Mobile operators ===
- Jazz (VimpelCom)
- Ufone (PTCL)
- Zong (China Mobile)
- Telenor Pakistan (Telenor)
- ONIC (ONIC)

=== Wireless Local Loop Operators ===
- PTCL (Etisalat)
- Wateen
- Wi-Tribe (Qtel)
- Cyber Internet Services
- LinkDotNet Telecom
- Sharp Communications

== Papua New Guinea ==
=== Fixed-line operators ===
- Telikom PNG

=== Mobile operators ===
- B-Mobile PNG (Black Dolphin/Capital Way Consortium)
- Citifon (Telikom PNG)
- Digicel (Digicel Group)

== Philippines ==
=== Fixed-line operators ===
- Converge ICT
- Eastern Communications
- Globe Telecom
- Philippine Long Distance Telephone
- Department of Information and Communications Technology (Philippine Public Wi-Fi project with Singapore Telecommunications)
- Infinivan

=== Mobile operators ===
- Dito Telecommunity (via DITO Prepaid/Postpaid)
- Globe Telecom (via Globe Prepaid/Postpaid, TM Prepaid, GOMO Prepaid, and Cherry Prepaid)
- Smart Communications (via Smart Prepaid/Postpaid, TNT Prepaid)

== Samoa ==
=== Fixed-line operators ===
- Samoa Telecom
- Telemar

== Singapore ==
=== Fixed-line operators ===
- SingTel
- StarHub (Temasek Holdings, Qtel, NTT & Mediacorp)

=== Mobile operators ===
- SingTel
- M1
- StarHub
- Simba
- Circles.Life
- MyRepublic
- TPG
- Grid Net – iDen & PTT Onlo

== Solomon Islands ==
=== Fixed-line operators ===
- Solomon Telekom Co Ltd (Our Telecom)

=== Mobile operators ===
- Bemobile/Vodafone
- Our Telekom

== South Korea ==
=== Fixed-line operators ===
- KT (Korea Telecom)
- LG U+ (LG Group)
- SK Broadband (SK Group)

=== Mobile operators ===
- KT (Korea Telecom)
- LG U+ (LG Group)
- SK Telecom (SK Group)

== Sri Lanka ==
=== Fixed-line operators ===
- Dialog
- Lanka Bell (Discontinued)
- SLTMobitel

=== Mobile operators ===
- Dialog
- Hutch
- SLTMobitel

== Taiwan ==
=== Fixed-line operators ===
- Chunghwa Telecom
- Taiwan Fixed Network (Taiwan Mobile)
- Digital United (Far EasTone)

=== Mobile operators ===
- Chunghwa Telecom
- Taiwan Mobile
- FarEasTone

== Tajikistan ==
=== Fixed-line operators ===
- Tajiktelecom

=== Mobile operators ===
- Tcell (Aga Khan Fund for Economic Development)
- Babilon-Mobile
- Beeline (ZET Mobile Ltd.)
- MegaFon (MegaFon)

== Thailand ==
=== Fixed-line operators ===
- National Telecom
- True Corporation
- AIS Fibre

=== Mobile operators ===
- Advanced Info Service
- DTAC
- True Move

== Tonga ==
The country had 0.030 million main lines in use in 2012.

== Turkmenistan ==
=== Fixed-line operators ===
- Turkmen Telecom
- Ashgabat City Telephone Network

=== Mobile operators ===
- Altyn Asyr
- MTS Turkmenistan

== Uzbekistan ==
=== Fixed-line operators ===
- Ucell
- UMS
- Uzbektelecom
- Beeline

=== Mobile operators ===
- Coscom (uCell)
- UMS (Mobiuz)
- Perfectum Mobile
- Unitel (Beeline)
- Uzbektelecom Mobile
- Humans

== Vietnam ==
=== Fixed-line operators ===
- Telecom
- SPT
- Viettel
- VNPT
- VTC
- CMC

=== Mobile operators ===
- Airtel
- Gtel
- Hanoi Telecom
- Mobifone
- Viettel
- Vinaphone

== See also ==
- Telephone company
- List of telecommunications companies
  - List of telecommunications companies in the Americas
  - List of telecommunications companies in Europe
  - List of telecommunications companies in the Middle East and Africa
- List of mobile network operators
  - List of mobile network operators of the Americas
  - List of mobile network operators in Asia and Oceania
  - List of mobile network operators in Europe
  - List of mobile network operators in the Middle East and Africa
