= Telephone numbers in Uzbekistan =

- Country: Uzbekistan
- Continent: Asia
- Numbering plan type: closed
- NSN length: 9
- Format: +998 BC XXXXXXX
- Country code: +998
- International access: 00
- Long-distance: (none)

The Uzbek telephone numbering plan describes the allocation of telephone numbers in Uzbekistan.

== Format ==
Phone numbers typically have nine digits (except for emergency services and certain short codes) and are composed of a two-digit area code followed by subscriber number. No trunk prefix is used.

== Area codes ==
The following are area codes and operator prefixes in Uzbekistan:

Code	Technology	Type	Locality or operator
20	mobile GSM	non-geographic	OQ (Beeline)
33	mobile GSM	non-geographic	Humans
50	mobile GSM	non-geographic	Ucell
55	VoIP	non-geographic	Uztelecom
61	fixed	geographic	Karakalpakstan (including Nukus)
62	fixed	geographic	Khorazm Region (including Urgench)
65	fixed	geographic	Bukhara Region (including Bukhara)
66	fixed	geographic	Samarkand Region (including Samarkand)
67	fixed	geographic	Sirdaryo Region (including Guliston)
69	fixed	geographic	Namangan Region (including Namangan)
70	mobile GSM	non-geographic	Uzmobile
71	fixed	geographic	Tashkent
72	fixed	geographic	Jizzakh Region (including Jizzakh)
73	fixed	geographic	Fergana Region (including Fergana)
74	fixed	geographic	Andijan Region (including Andijan)
75	fixed	geographic	Qashqadaryo Region (including Qarshi)
76	fixed	geographic	Surxondaryo Region (including Termez)
77	mobile GSM	non-geographic	Uzmobile
78	fixed	non-geographic	Various operators
79	fixed	geographic	Navoiy Region (including Navoiy)
80	mobile 5G-SA	non-geographic	Perfectum Mobile
87	mobile GSM	non-geographic	Mobiuz
88	mobile GSM	non-geographic	Mobiuz
90	mobile GSM	non-geographic	Beeline
91	mobile GSM	non-geographic	Beeline
92	mobile GSM	non-geographic	Beeline
93	mobile GSM	non-geographic	Ucell
94	mobile GSM	non-geographic	Ucell
95	mobile CDMA	non-geographic	Uzmobile
97	mobile GSM	non-geographic	Mobiuz
98	mobile CDMA	non-geographic	Perfectum Mobile
99	mobile GSM	non-geographic	Uzmobile

== International dialling ==
International call prefix when dialling from Uzbekistan is 00, having replaced the earlier prefix 8~10.
