= Internet censorship in Pakistan =

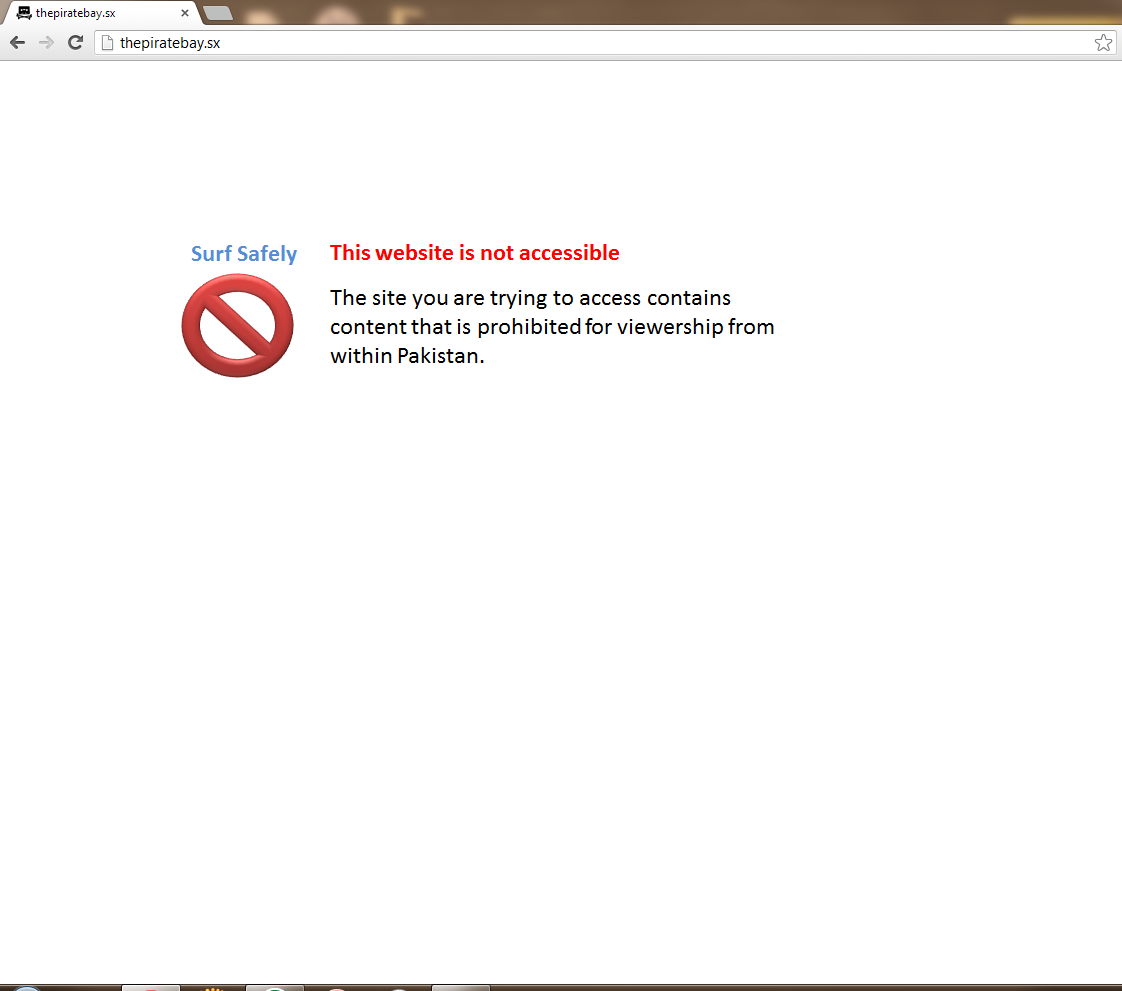
Internet users in Pakistan are prompted to this message when accessing blocked websites.

Internet censorship in Pakistan refers to measures implemented by the government to regulated and restrict access to online content, including information transmitted through the internet and social media platforms .Such restrictions have periodically included the blocking of websites and social networking services. The most recent nationwide restriction involved a ban was on X (formerly Twitter) imposed around the time of the 2024 general elections; access to the platform was subsequently restored on 7 May 2025.

There have been significant instances of website access restriction in Pakistan, most notably when YouTube was banned/blocked from 2012 to 2016. Pakistan has asked a number of social media organisations to set up local offices within the country, but this is yet to happen.

Pakistan made global headlines in 2010 for blocking Facebook and other Web sites in response to a contest popularized on the social networking site to draw images of the Islamic prophet Muhammad. In general, Internet filtering in Pakistan remains both inconsistent and intermittent, with filtering primarily targeted at content deemed to be a threat to national security, pornography, homosexuality and at religious content considered blasphemous. However, the present banning of Twitter is politically motivated.

In 2019, the National Assembly Standing Committee on Information Technology and Telecom was informed by Pakistan Telecommunication Authority (PTA) that 900,000 URLs were blocked in Pakistan for "reasons such as carrying blasphemous and pornographic content and/or sentiments against the state, judiciary or the armed forces." In February 2023, Wikipedia was banned by the PTA for two days over alleged blasphemous content.

== Overview ==
In mid-2012 Pakistanis had relatively easy access to a wide range of content, including most sexual, political, social, and religious sites on the Internet. The OpenNet Initiative listed Internet filtering in Pakistan as substantial in the conflict/security area, and as selective in the political, social, and Internet tools areas in August 2012. Additionally, Freedom House rated Pakistan's "Freedom on the Net Status" as "Not Free" in its Freedom on the Net 2022 report. This is still true as of 2022.

Internet filtering in Pakistan is regulated by the Pakistan Telecommunication Authority (PTA) and the Federal Investigation Agency (FIA) under the direction of the government, the Supreme Court of Pakistan, and the Ministry of Information Technology (MoIT). Although the majority of filtering in Pakistan is intermittent—such as the occasional block on a major Web site like Blogspot or YouTube—the PTA continues to block sites containing content it considers to be blasphemous, anti-Islamic, or threatening to internal security. Online civil society activism that began in order to protect free expression in the country continues to expand as citizens utilize new media to disseminate information and organize.

Pakistan has blocked access to websites critical of the government or the military. Blocking of websites is often carried out under the rubric of restricting access to "blasphemous" content, pornography, or religious immorality. At the end of 2011, the PTA had officially banned more than 1,000 pornographic websites in Pakistan.

== Political Censorship ==
=== 2024 Censorship on Twitter ===
X, formerly known as Twitter, was inaccessible in Pakistan from February 2024 to May 2025. The Pakistan government blocked access to the social media platform around the time of the 2024 February elections, citing national security concerns. Despite the government's stance, both the government and the Pakistan Telecommunication Authority (PTA) refused to comment on the outages, which were widely reported by internet watchdog groups.

Activists challenging the ban argue that it was designed to suppress dissent following the February 8 general elections, which were marred by widespread claims of vote rigging and subsequent protests. Authorities had also shut down mobile services on the day of the elections, again citing security concerns. NetBlocks, an internet monitoring group, reported that users were unable to access X on 10 February while the country was awaiting the election results.

In April 2024, the Sindh High Court ordered the government to restore access to the platform within one week, according to a report by the AFP news agency, citing lawyer Moiz Jaaferi, who had launched a separate challenge against the ban. Despite this order, access to X was sporadic, with availability fluctuating based on the internet service provider, which forced users to rely on virtual private networks (VPNs), as noted by Alp Toker of NetBlocks.

Imran Khan's Pakistan Tehreek-e-Insaf (PTI) party, a prolific user of social media platforms, was particularly impacted by this ban. This reliance on social media grew especially after the country's traditional media began censoring news about Khan and his party in the run-up to the elections. Khan, who has more than 20 million followers on X, saw his party call for protests against alleged rigging in the February 2024 General Elections. A government official's admission of vote manipulation in mid-February raised further concerns about the transparency of the elections confirming Imran Khan's claims to many and furthering the allegations.

NetBlocks, the internet Observatory confirmed through its Live metrics showing X/Twitter has been restricted in #Pakistan for since February, with service remaining fully or intermittently restricted for most users. They added that the incident comes amidst a surge in internet censorship during elections marred by irregularities in Pakistan. Asad Baig, a media strategist at Dawn News said that "The government's actions reek of authoritarianism, stifling dissent, and silencing voices in the name of maintaining control." Several condemnations of the ban were also exchanged by many non-governmental organizations.

However, at the start of the 2025 India–Pakistan conflict, the ban on X was silently lifted, which was noticed after multiple users could access the website and use the platform without the need of any VPNs or proxy services. Due to the situation of the conflict at the time, speculation led to the belief that the ban was lifted to counter Indian trolls & misinformation about the conflict on the site. No official statement has been released to explain the lifting of the ban.

=== Intimidation and arrests over social media posts ===
In 2017, Taha Siddiqui, a Pakistani journalist, pointed out the Pakistani military’s false glorification of the 1965 India-Pakistan war on social media and he was subsequently warned by a military official against disruption of their media campaign. In 2018, armed men tried to kidnap him in Islamabad, forcing him to flee and relocate to France.

In June 2026, YouTuber Razi Tahir was arrested and subsequently handed over to National Cyber Crime Investigation Agency (NCCIA) over controversial social media posts regarding an alleged meeting between Imran Khan and a former senior public figure after his pre-arrest bail application was rejected by a court.

== Pakistan Internet Exchange ==
The Pakistan Internet Exchange (PIE), operated by the state-owned Pakistan Telecommunication Company Ltd (PTCL), was created to facilitate the exchange of Internet traffic between ISPs within and outside of Pakistan. Because the majority of Pakistan's Internet traffic is routed through the PIE (98% of Pakistani ISPs used the PIE in 2004), it provides a means to monitor and possibly block incoming and outgoing Internet traffic as the government deems fit.

Internet surveillance in Pakistan is primarily conducted by the PIE under the auspices of the PTA. The PIE monitors all incoming and outgoing Internet traffic from Pakistan, as well as e-mail and keywords, and stores data for a specified amount of time. Law enforcement agencies such as the FIA can be asked by the government to conduct surveillance and monitor content. Under the Prevention of Electronic Crimes Ordinance (PECO), ISPs are required to retain traffic data for a minimum of 90 days and may also be required to collect real-time data and record information while keeping their involvement with the government confidential. The ordinance does not specify what kinds of actions constitute grounds for data collection and surveillance.

== Pakistan Telecommunication Company ==
In April 2003, the PTCL announced that it would be stepping up monitoring of pornographic websites. "Anti-Islamic" and "blasphemous" sites were also monitored. In early March 2004, the Federal Investigation Agency (FIA) ordered Internet service providers (ISPs) to monitor access to all pornographic content. The ISPs, however, lacked the technical know-how, and felt that the PTCL was in a better position to carry out FIA's order. A Malaysian firm was then hired to provide a filtering system, but failed to deliver a working system.

== National URL filtering and blocking system ==
In March 2012, the Pakistan government took the unusual step of touting for firms that could help build it a nationwide content-filtering service. The Pakistan Telecommunication Authority published a request for proposals for the "deployment and operation of a national level URL Filtering and Blocking System" which would operate on similar lines to China's Golden Shield, or "Great Firewall". Academic and research institutions as well as private commercial entities had until 16 March to submit their proposals, according to the request's detailed 35-point system requirements list. Key among these is the following: "Each box should be able to handle a block list of up to 50 million URLs (concurrent unidirectional filtering capacity) with processing delay of not more than 1 milliseconds".

=== Deep packet inspection (DPI) ===
The Pakistan Telecommunication Authority (PTA) states that the DPI system has been installed to implement the Prevention of Electronic Crimes Act (PECA) 2016, particularly to filter and block blasphemous content and any material that is considered to be against the integrity or security of Pakistan. Canadian firm Sandvine was contracted to provide and set up the equipment in Pakistan.

== Interception and web monitoring systems ==
Pakistani authorities have allegedly employed two key surveillance technologies—the Lawful Intercept Management System (LIMS) and the Web Monitoring System 2.0 (WMS)—to monitor and control digital communications and internet access nationwide. LIMS allows intelligence agencies to tap calls and intercept text messages, with the capacity to monitor at least 4 million mobile phones simultaneously; the actual number may be higher, as all four major mobile operators in the country have reportedly been directed to integrate with the system. Telecommunications providers were reported to be "under an obligation to ensure that up to two per cent of their entire consumer base can be surveilled." Functioning alongside LIMS, the WMS 2.0 firewall inspects internet traffic in real time and can block up to 2 million active sessions at once, enabling authorities to slow down or restrict access to websites and social media platforms. The two systems operate in tandem—LIMS focuses on telecommunications surveillance, while WMS enforces internet censorship and throttling. The initial version of WMS was reportedly installed by Sandvine in 2018, but has since been replaced by a more advanced version developed by Chinese company Geedge Networks, resembling China's Great Firewall. The deployment of this infrastructure was allegedly supported by foreign firms including Niagara Networks and New H3C Technologies.

== Jyllands-Posten Muhammad cartoons ==
The Jyllands-Posten Muhammad cartoons controversy began after 12 editorial cartoons, most of which had depictions of Muhammad, were published in the Danish newspaper Jyllands-Posten on 30 September 2005. This led to protests across the Muslim world, some of which escalated into violence with instances of firing on crowds of protestors, resulting in more than 100 reported deaths, and included the bombing of the Danish embassy in Pakistan, setting fire to the Danish Embassies in Syria, Lebanon and Iran, storming of European buildings, and the burning of the Danish, Dutch, Norwegian, French, and German flags in Gaza City. The posting of the cartoons online added to the controversy.

On 1 March 2006 the Supreme Court of Pakistan directed the government to keep tabs on Internet sites displaying the cartoons and called for an explanation from authorities as to why these sites had not been blocked earlier. On 2 March 2006, pursuant to a petition filed under Article 184(3) of the Constitution of Pakistan, the Supreme Court sitting en banc ordered the Pakistan Telecommunication Authority (PTA) and other government departments to adopt measures for blocking websites showing blasphemous content. The Court also ordered Attorney General Makhdoom Ali Khan to explore laws which would enable blocking of objectionable websites. In announcing the decision, Chief Justice Iftikhar Muhammad Chaudhry, said, "We will not accept any excuse or technical objection on this issue because it relates to the sentiments of the entire Muslim world. All authorities concerned will have to appear in the Court on the next hearing with reports of concrete measures taken to implement our order".

Consequently, the government kept tabs on a number of websites hosting the cartoons deemed to be sacrilegious. This ban included all the weblogs hosted at the popular blogging service blogger.com, as some bloggers had put up copies of the cartoons – particularly many non-Pakistani blogs.

A three-member bench headed by Chief Justice Chaudhry, summoned the country's Attorney General as well as senior communication ministry officials to give a report of "concrete measures for implementation of the court's order". At the hearing on 14 March 2006, the PTA informed the Supreme Court that all websites displaying the Muhammad cartoons had been blocked. The bench issued directions to the Attorney General of Pakistan, Makhdoom Ali Khan, to assist the court on how it could exercise jurisdiction to prevent the availability of blasphemous material on websites the world over.

The blanket ban on the blogspot.com blogs was lifted on 2 May 2006. Shortly thereafter the blanket ban was reimposed and extended to Typepad blogs. The blanket ban on the blogspot.com blogs was later lifted again.

Allegations of suppressing vote-rigging videos by the Musharraf administration were also leveled by Pakistani bloggers, newspapers, media, and Pakistani anti-Musharraf opposition parties. The ban was lifted on 26 February 2008.

== Social media and platform blocking ==
YouTube was blocked in Pakistan following a decision taken by the Pakistan Telecommunication Authority on 22 February 2008 because of the number of "non-Islamic objectionable videos." One report specifically named Fitna, a controversial Dutch film, as the basis for the block. Pakistan, an Islamic republic, ordered its ISPs to block access to YouTube "for containing blasphemous web content/movies." The action effectively blocked YouTube access worldwide for several hours on 24 February. Defaming Muhammad under § 295-C of the Blasphemy law in Pakistan requires a death sentence. This followed increasing unrest in Pakistan by over the reprinting of the Jyllands-Posten Muhammad cartoons which depict satirical criticism of Islam. Router misconfiguration by one Pakistani ISP on 24 February 2008 effectively blocked YouTube access worldwide for several hours. On 26 February 2008, the ban was lifted after the website had removed the objectionable content from its servers at the demand of the Government of Pakistan.

On 19 and 20 May 2010, Pakistan's Telecommunication Authority PTA imposed a ban on Wikipedia, YouTube, Flickr, and Facebook in response to a competition entitled Everybody Draw Mohammed Day on Facebook, in a bid to contain "blasphemous" material. The ban imposed on Facebook was the result of a ruling by the Lahore High Court, while the ban on the other websites was imposed arbitrarily by the PTA on the grounds of "objectionable content", a different response from earlier requests, such as pages created to promote peaceful demonstrations in Pakistani cities being removed because they were "inciting violence". The sitewide ban on Facebook was lifted on 27 May 2010, after Facebook filtered content so that users in Pakistan could not access the "blasphemous" content. However, individual videos deemed offensive to Muslims that are posted on YouTube will continue to be blocked.

In September 2012, the PTA blocked the video-sharing website YouTube for not removing an anti-Islamic film made in the United States, Innocence of Muslims, which mocks Muhammed. The website would remain suspended, it was stated, until the film was removed. In a related move, the PTA announced that it had blocked about 20,000 websites due to "objectionable" content.

On 25 July 2013, the government announced that it is mulling over reopening YouTube during the second week of August. A special 12-member committee was working under the Minister of IT and Telecommunication, Anusha Rahman, to see if objectionable content can be removed. The Pakistan Telecommunication Authority, the telecom watchdog in the country, has already expressed its inability to filter out select content.

On 21 April 2014, Pakistan's Senate Standing Committee on Human Rights requested the Federal Government remove the ban on YouTube.

On 8 February 2015, the government announced that YouTube will remain blocked 'indefinitely' because no tool or solution had been found which can totally block offensive content. As of June 2015 — 1,000 days on — the ban was still in effect, and YouTube cannot be accessed from either desktop or mobile devices.

The ban was lifted due to technical glitch on 6 December 2015 according to ISPs in Pakistan. As September 2016, the ban has been lifted officially, as YouTube launched a local version for Pakistan.

On 25 November 2017, the NetBlocks internet shutdown observatory and Digital Rights Foundation identified mass-scale blocking of social media and content-sharing websites including YouTube, Twitter and Facebook throughout Pakistan imposed by the government in response to the violent Tehreek-e-Labaik protests. The technical investigation found that all major Pakistani fixed-line and mobile service providers were affected by the restrictions, which were lifted by the PTA the next day when protests abated following the resignation of Minister for Law and Justice Zahid Hamid.

In 2019, The National Assembly Standing Committee on Information Technology and Telecom was informed by the PTA that 900,000 URLs were blocked in Pakistan for "reasons such as carrying blasphemous and pornographic content and/or sentiments against the state, judiciary or the armed forces."

On 9 October 2020, TikTok was banned by the PTA for "immoral content".

On 16 April 2021, various social media applications were banned. The Ministry of Interior ordered the PTA to restrict access of Pakistani users to Twitter, Facebook, WhatsApp, YouTube, and Telegram. It was issued to block these social media websites from 11:00 AM to 03:00 PM on Friday with an immediate effect. The reason to put a temporary ban on these social media platforms was not mentioned on the official notice. Later on, PTA explained the ban by putting forward the statement, "In order to maintain public order and safety, access to certain social media applications has been restricted temporarily." There was a severe condition in Pakistan due to Tehreek-e-Labbaik Pakistan anti-France protests. The condition became more intense after Pakistan announced to ban Tehreek-e-Labbaik Pakistan under Anti-Terror Law.

On Sunday 5 February 2023, Wikipedia was banned due to not removing purportedly blasphemous materials but it could still be accessed using the app. The ban was lifted on Tuesday 7 February 2023, with the PM Office stating, "Blocking the site in its entirety was not a suitable measure to restrict access to some objectionable contents and sacrilegious matter on it."

In February 2024, X (formerly Twitter) was reportedly blocked as per reports of users. However, there were no official announcements from the government. On 17 April 2024, Pakistan's interior ministry told the Islamabad High Court that the block was amid the general election over national security concerns. Later the court asked the government to restore the platform within one week. The website later was unblocked in May 2025

In November 2024, Bluesky was banned by Pakistani authorities, which was confirmed by internet watchdog NetBlocks.

As of 2025, more than 1.4 million URLs have been blocked in Pakistan since the passage of the Prevention of Electronic Crimes Act (PECA) in 2016, with the content regulation process drawing criticism for its lack of transparency. According to Amnesty International, Pakistan was actively blocking around 650,000 web links and restricting access to platforms including YouTube, Facebook, and X.

== Netsweeper usage ==
In June 2013, the Citizen Lab interdisciplinary research laboratory uncovered that Canadian internet-filtering product Netsweeper was in use at the national level in Pakistan. The system had categorized billions of URLs and was adding approximately 10 million new URLs every day. The lab also confirmed that ISPs in Pakistan were using methods of DNS tampering to block websites at the behest of the Pakistan Telecommunication Authority.

According to the report published by the lab, "Netsweeper technology is being implemented in Pakistan for purposes of political and social filtering, including websites of secessionist movements, sensitive religious topics, and independent media."

== 2020 rules ==
In October 2020, the Government of Pakistan issued new policy rules called Citizens Protection (Against Online Harm) Rules 2020 or the Removal and Blocking of Unlawful Content (Procedure, Oversight and Safeguards) under 2016 Prevention of Electronic Crimes Act (PECA).

The Government of Pakistan intends to access internet user data and control and remove content deemed as "objectionable". The companies would be required to remove or block any asked content from their websites within 24 hours after being reported by Pakistani authorities, social media companies or internet service providers face may be fined of up to $3.14 million (€2.57 million) for failure to curb the sharing of content deemed to be defamatory of Islam, promoting terrorism, hate speech, pornography or any content viewed as problematic to Pakistan's national security.

Rights activists complained that the new rules compromised user privacy at the mercy of the Pakistani establishment, with no judicial oversight, and the likely effect of eroding media freedoms and the freedom of expression further would erode political freedoms and result in increased censorship.

Since then, dating apps like Tinder are banned in Pakistan, video sharing app TikTok faced a temporary ban until it removed certain content, and notices have been issued to U.S.A. based Ahmadiyya community web portal TrueIslam.com, Google and Wikipedia for returning search results displaying the Ahmadiyya community and their leadership, Mirza Masroor Ahmad, 's claims of Muslimness.

== Blocked by Pakistan Telecommunication Authority ==
| Name | Type of site | Stated reason | Start date | Resolution date | Blocked by |
|---|---|---|---|---|---|
| YouTube | Video hosting service | Blasphemous material | 25 February 2008 | | |
| YouTube | Video hosting service | Blasphemous material | May 2010 | | |
| Flickr | Social networking service | Blasphemous material (partial block) | May 2010 | | |
| Omegle (now defunct) | Social networking service | No reason stated | Nov 2021 | Unknown | |
| 9gag | Social networking service | No reason stated | Nov 2021 | Unknown | |
| Wikipedia | Multilingual, web-based, free-content encyclopedia | Blasphemous material (partial block) | May 2010 | | |
| Twitter | Social networking service | Blasphemous material | May 2010 | | |
| Rabwah Times | Online newspaper | Blasphemous material | 29 May 2014 | Current | |
| WordPress | Blog hosting | National Security | 22 March 2015 | | |
| Quora | Q&A website | No reason stated | 17 September 2019 | 24 September 2019 | |
| Reddit (some subreddits only) | Social news | Pornography | Unknown | Current | |
| Imgur | Image sharing platform | Pornography | 3 January 2020 | 23 December 2020 | |
| ImgBox | Image sharing platform | No reason stated | Unknown | Unknown | |
| uTorrent | Torrent Client | No reason stated | Unknown | Unknown | |
| TikTok | Social | Immoral content | 9 October 2020 | 20 October 2020 | |
| DeviantArt | Image Sharing Platform | Pornography | Unknown (discovered 1 January 2021) | 21 May 2024 | |
| Facebook | Social networking platform | No reason stated | 1100hrs PKT, 16 April 2021. | 1500hrs PKT, 16 April 2021. | |
| Twitter | Social networking platform | No reason stated | 1100hrs PKT, 16 April 2021. | 1500hrs PKT, 16 April 2021. | |
| YouTube | Video hosting service | No reason stated | 1100hrs PKT, 16 April 2021. | 1500hrs PKT, 16 April 2021. | |
| WhatsApp | Messaging service | No reason stated | 1100hrs PKT, 16 April 2021. | 1500hrs PKT, 16 April 2021. | |
| Telegram | Messaging service | No reason stated | 1100hrs PKT, 16 April 2021. | 1500hrs PKT, 16 April 2021. | |
| Wikipedia | Multilingual, web-based, free-content encyclopedia | Sacrilegious Content | 4 February 2023 | 7 February 2023 | |
| Insaf.pk | Political website | | 26 January 2024 | Till Date | Probably PTA |
| Twitter | Social networking platform | Amid Disinformation | 19 February 2024 | 8 May 2025 | Probably PTA |
| VK (service) | Social networking platform | No Reason Stated (May be due to Porn) | Unknown | Till Date | Probably PTA |

== Video games ban ==
=== PUBG ban ===
In July 2020, the PTA banned the online game PlayerUnknown's Battlegrounds, Millions of social media users of Pakistan have flooded sites like Facebook, Twitter and have shown overwhelming support for PUBG (PlayerUnknown's Battlegrounds). In response, the PTA lifted its ban on the popular online game.

== Other notable bans ==
- Richard Dawkins's website and the Internet Movie Database (IMDb) were blocked for brief periods in 2013.
- Xbox Live and GameRanger were blocked accidentally on 7 February 2013 by the Pakistan Telecom Authority.
- Major Torrenting Websites. In July 2013, Pakistani ISPs banned 6 of the top 10 public Torrent sites in Pakistan. These sites include Piratebay, Kickass torrents, Torrentz, Bitsnoop, Extra Torrent and Torrent Reactor. They also banned the similar site Mininova. However proxies for these torrent sites are still active and P2P connections are working normally. This move lead to a massive public backlash, especially from the Twitter and Facebook communities of Pakistan. In the aftermath of such critique, the IT Minister of Pakistan, Anusha Rahman, deactivated her Twitter account. Popular BitTorrent client μTorrent is also banned in Pakistan, it gives an "ERR_SSL_PROTOCOL_ERROR", but with a virtual private network (VPN), the site works, users are facing this issue from few years, still facing in 2022.
- Pouet, a website about demoscene was banned as of 19 June 2015.
- Imgur, a website about image sharing/hosting was banned in December 2015.
- Reddit (NSFW content only) was also banned in 2019.
- An extreme form of word censorship is effective on all website's URLs. URLs containing words like "sex" and "porn" are blocked, including pages on medical information sites like WebMD, MedicineNet about sexual health and couples therapy. This is similar to word censorship in effect for SMS and text messages.

== See also ==
- Censorship in Pakistan
- Censorship in South Asia
- Constitution of Pakistan
- Freedom of speech in Pakistan
- Freedom of the press in Pakistan
- Information technology in Pakistan
- Internet in Pakistan
- Pornography in Pakistan
