= AAE-1 =

Submarine communications cable system

Asia-Africa-Europe 1 (AAE-1)
- Cable type: Submarine Fibre-optic
- First traffic: 23 June 2017
- Design capacity: 100 Tbit/s (20 Tbit/s per fibre pair)
- Area served: Africa, South East Asia, Middle East, Western Europe
- Owner(s): Consortium
- Website: www.aaeone.com

Asia-Africa-Europe 1 (AAE-1) is a 25,000 km submarine communications cable system from South East Asia to Europe across Egypt, connecting Hong Kong, Vietnam, Cambodia, Malaysia, Singapore, Thailand, Myanmar, India, Pakistan, Oman, UAE, Qatar, Yemen, Djibouti, Saudi Arabia, Egypt, Greece, Italy, and France.

The AAE-1 cable has a design capacity of 40 Tbit/s, across 5 fibre pairs, to supply the broadband market across Asia, Africa and Europe. In June 2017, it was launched for commercial services and was considered the longest submarine cable in the world, until it was surpassed by 2Africa.

AAE-1 terminates at carrier neutral data centers in regional hubs, such as Telecom House in Hong Kong, Equinix in Singapore and Interxion in France.

In May 2022, AAE-1's SLTE was upgraded by the consortium through Infinera's ICE6 800G solution, increasing design capacity to over 100 Tbit/s.

== Consortium members ==
China Unicom initiated the AAE-1 cable project in 2011, with the support and partnership from Telecom Egypt. The AAE-1 consortium, which obtained the construction and maintenance contract in 2014, consists of over 17 carriers, including China Unicom, Djibouti Telecom, Etisalat, Global Transit, HyalRoute, Jio, Metfone, Mobily, Omantel, Ooredoo, Oteglobe, PCCW Global, PTCL, Retelit, Telecom Egypt, TeleYemen, TOT, VNPT, Viettel.

== Landing points and operators ==
AAE-1 does not land directly in Singapore, instead it connects through a terrestrial extension between Malaysia and Singapore.

AAE-1 Cable Landing Points
Location	Operator & Technical Partner
Marseille, France	Omantel
Bari, Italy	Retelit
Chania, Greece	OTEGLOBE
Abu Talat, Egypt Zafarana, Egypt	Telecom Egypt
Jeddah, Saudi Arabia	Mobily
Djibouti City, Djibouti	Djibouti Telecom
Aden, Yemen	TeleYemen
Al Bustan, Oman	Omantel
Fujairah, UAE	Etisalat by e&
Doha, Qatar	Ooredoo Qatar
Karachi, Pakistan	Pakistan Telecommunicaton Company Limited
Mumbai, India	Reliance Jio
Ngwe Saung, Myanmar	China Unicom
Satun, Thailand	National Telecom Public Company Limited
Songkhla, Thailand	National Telecom Public Company Limited
Butterworth, Malaysia	TIME dotCom
Sihanoukville, Cambodia	HyalRoute
Vung Tau, Vietnam	Vietnam Posts and Telecommunications Group
Cape D'Aguilar, Hong Kong	PCCW Global

== Incidents ==
=== February 2024 ===
On 26 February 2024, it was reported that multiple submarine cables in the Red Sea, including AAE-1, SEACOM and EIG were damaged. As a result, 25% of the internet traffic between Europe, Asia and the Middle East has been affected. The cause of the damage is currently unknown, and due to the sensitivity of the location, the cable operators are currently unable to provide a repair timeline.

One hypothesis for the source of the damage is that the cable was severed by the dragging anchor of the MV Rubymar vessel which was abandoned by its crew after Houthi forces attacked it with two anti-ship missiles. As of 13 May 2024, repairs to AAE-1 were still pending due to the refusal of permits from the Yemeni Government.

In July 2024, repairs were successfully carried out on the AAE-1 cable.

=== May 2024 ===
On 24 May 2024, the AAE-1 cable developed a fault on the S1H5 branch, which connects Vietnam to Singapore. After multiple delays, repairs were completed in December 2024 and power reconfiguration on the S1H5 branch restored full capacity to Hong Kong and Singapore on 31 December 2024.

=== December 2024 ===
On 29 December 2024, the AAE-1 cable was reported to have been cut approximately 180 kilometers from Zafarana, Egypt impacting traffic to Marseille. The outage was estimated to be resolved by mid-February 2025 but has been hit with several delays. On 4 March 2025, the PEACE Cable was reportedly cut approximately 1,450 kilometers from Zafarana. With both the AAE-1 and PEACE cables disrupted simultaneously, capacity between Asia and Europe were negatively impacted.

In April 2025, repairs on the AAE-1 cable were completed and traffic towards Marseille was restored.

=== January 2025 ===
On the evening of 2 January 2025, the AAE-1 cable system suffered a shunt fault off the coast of Doha, Qatar causing significant network capacity degradation in Pakistan which relies heavily on AAE-1 for international bandwidth. On 16 January 2025, PTCL announced that the fault was resolved.
