= LabelsBank.com =

Website that sold counterfeit US postage

- The website as it appears as of November 2, 2026
- Country of origin: Pakistan
- Website: labelsbank.com
- Launched: August 2023; 3 years ago
- Current status: Seized by the United States Postal Inspection Service

The notice put out by the USPIS offering a $100,000 reward for tips

LabelsBank.com was a website that was seized and shut down by the United States Postal Inspection Service in 2026 after allegedly selling more than 5.1 million counterfeit United States Postal Service (USPS) postage labels at a flat $2 each to over 5,200 individuals. The forgeries caused over $126 million in losses to the USPS. The website was founded in August 2023. A 33-year-old software engineer named Faheem Akram from Khanewal, Pakistan was arrested by Pakistan's cybercrime agency on October 21, 2026 for his accused running of the operation. According to their investigation, Akram was using 16 bank accounts belonging to family members as part of the scheme. Akram was indicted by a federal grand jury in the Southern District of Florida. He is charged with one count of conspiracy to defraud the United States, five counts of making and selling counterfeit postage stamps, and four counts of wire fraud.
