= SEA-ME-WE 6 =

Submarine communications cable system

- Cable type: Submarine Fibre-optic
- Predecessor: SEA-ME-WE, SEA-ME-WE 2, SEA-ME-WE 3, SEA-ME-WE 4, SEA-ME-WE 5
- Construction beginning: 21 February 2022
- Construction finished: Expected RFS late 2027
- Design capacity: 126 Tbit/s (12.6 Tbit/s per fibre pair)
- Area served: South East Asia, Middle East Asia, Western Europe
- Owner(s): Consortium

South East Asia–Middle East–Western Europe 6 (SEA-ME-WE 6) is an in-progress optical fibre submarine communications cable system that would carry telecommunications between Southeast Asia, the Middle East, and Western Europe. Construction began in February 2022. The expected cable length is 19,200 km and it has a design capacity of 126 Tbit/s (12.6 Tbit/s per fiber pair), using SDM technology.

France, Italy, Egypt, Turkey, Saudi Arabia, Djibouti, Oman, Qatar, Bahrain, UAE, Yemen, Pakistan, India, Maldives, Sri Lanka, Bangladesh, Myanmar, Thailand, Indonesia, Malaysia and Singapore are members of the SEA-ME-WE 6 consortium.

In May 2023, it was reported the U.S. government had objected to Chinese participation in the cable due to security concerns, and construction was moved from Huawei Marine Networks to a U.S. consortium, SubCom. Due to rising geopolitical tensions between China and the US, two Chinese operators, namely China Telecom and China Mobile withdrew from the consortium. They are planning a rival cable with China Unicom.

As of November 2025, the cable has been installed at landing points in France, Egypt, Maldives, Pakistan, Sri Lanka and India, with more landings to be completed prior to the expected initiation of service in Q1 2026.

RFS for SMW6 has been delayed to late 2027 due to geopolitical instability in the Middle East preventing the cable system from being completed.

== Landing points and operators ==
SEA-ME-WE 6 Landing points
Location	Operator & Technical Partner
Marseille, France	Orange S.A
Port Said, Egypt Ras Ghareb, Egypt	Telecom Egypt
Yanbu, Saudi Arabia	Mobily
Djibouti City, Dijbouti	Djibouti Telecom
Karachi, Pakistan	Transworld Associates
Chennai, India Mumbai, India	Bharti Airtel
Hulhumale, Maldives	Dhiraagu
Matara, Sri Lanka	Sri Lanka Telecom
Cox's Bazar, Bangladesh	Bangladesh Submarine Cable Company Limited
Morib, Malaysia	Telekom Malaysia
Tuas, Singapore	Singtel

=== Al Khaleej Branch ===
Al Khaleej is a branch of the upcoming SEA-ME-WE 6 cable connecting the UAE to Bahrain, Oman and Qatar. Jointly operated by Batelco and Etisalat by e&, it will be 1,400 km long and ready for service in Q2 2026.

Al Khaleej Branch (Planned Landing points)
Location	Operator & Technical Partner
Barka, Oman	Batelco (Al Khaleej Branch)
Doha, Qatar	Batelco (Al Khaleej Branch)
Manama, Bahrain	Batelco (Al Khaleej Branch)
Abu Dhabi, UAE	Etisalat by e& (Al Khaleej Branch)
