= Mohamed Ashmalee =

Maldivian politician

- މުހައްމަދު އަޝްމަލީ

Former Minister for State for Finance and Treasury

Personal details
- Political party: Progressive Party of Maldives

Mohamed Ashmalee (Dhivehi: މުހައްމަދު އަޝްމަލީ) is a Maldivian politician who is a former Minister for State for Finance and Treasury and former chairman of Dhiraagu.

== Early career and family life ==
Born to Maldivian parents, Mohamed Ashmalee was raised in Malé. He has one elder brother.

Before pursuing a career in politics, Mohamed Ashmalee held posts from operations manager to managing director in various public and private sector companies in various fields such as construction, tourism, management, finance, information technology and medical management.

In 2014, he was appointed Deputy Minister for Finance and Treasury.

== Political career ==
Mohamed Ashmalee is the former Minister of State for Finance and Treasury as well as the Executive Head of the National Bureau of Statistics (NBS) under the same ministry.

He supervised the policy and daily operations of Department of National Registration (DNR), National Archives of the Maldives (NAM), National Centre for Information Technology (NCIT) and National Statistics Division (NDS) all of which are under the management of National Bureau of Statistics.

Mohamed Ashmalee is also the former chairperson and government director of Dhiraagu, the largest telecommunications operator in the Maldives.
