= Telecommunications in the Maldives =

Telecommunications in the Maldives is under the control and supervision of the Communications Authority of Maldives (CAM). The Maldives is served by three telecommunications operators, Dhiraagu, Ooredoo Maldives and Raajjé Online.

== Connectivity ==
According to analysis published by the International Finance Corporation (IFC), telecommunications infrastructure in the Maldives faces challenges due to the country’s dispersed geography. The Maldives consists of approximately 1,200 scattered small islands, only a portion of which are inhabited, increasing the cost and complexity of deploying telecommunications networks across a wide geographic area.

International internet connectivity has historically depended on routes via Sri Lanka and India, using other service providers for onward connectivity. This dependence on intermediary networks has been cited as contributing to high bandwidth costs, reduced resilience, and internet capacity bottlenecks. In the early 2020s, the Maldives began developing its first directly owned international submarine cable system as part of the South-East Asia–Middle East–Western Europe (SMW6) submarine cable consortium.

== Telephones ==
Mobile network operators (MNOs): 2, Dhiraagu and Ooredoo Maldives (2020)

Telephones – Fixedline's in use: 21,000 (1999)

Telephones – Mobile Cellular: 344,000 (2007)

Telephone system: domestic: interatoll communication through microwave links; all inhabited islands are connected with telephone and fax service. international: satellite earth station – 3 Intelsat (Indian Ocean)

== Radio and television ==
Radio broadcast stations: AM 1, FM 5, shortwave 1 (2008)

Radios: 35,000 (1999)

Television broadcast stations: 9 (2009)

Televisions: 10,000 (1999)

== Internet ==
Internet service providers (ISPs): 3, Dhiraagu, Ooredoo Maldives and Raajjé Online (2020)

Internet users: 20,000 (2008)

Country code (Top level domain): .mv

MV Domain registrar: Dhiraagu

== See also ==
- Dhiraagu
- Ooredoo Maldives
- Raajjé Online
