= .mv =

Internet country-code top level domain for the Maldives

- Introduced: 25 September 1996
- TLD type: Country code top-level domain
- Status: Active
- Registry: Dhiraagu
- Sponsor: Dhiraagu
- Intended use: Entities connected with the Maldives
- Actual use: Some use by Maldives-related sites, especially government-related
- Registration restrictions: None for .com.mv and .org.mv; other subdomains may have restrictions
- Structure: Registrations permitted directly at second level or at third level beneath various labels
- Registry website: www.dhiraagu.com.mv

.mv is the Internet country code top-level domain (ccTLD) for the Republic of Maldives. It is administered by Dhiraagu Pvt Ltd, a telecommunications company.

Mainly due to the unavailability of an online registration service, a whois lookup and large maintenance cost, the Maldivian ccTLD is used predominantly by government agencies and large businesses. Smaller companies and organisations prefer generic TLDs such as .com and .net.

== Second-level domains ==
- .aero.mv – Aviation
- .biz.mv – Business organisation
- .com.mv – Commercial
- .coop.mv – Cooperative organisation
- .edu.mv – Educational institutions
- .gov.mv – Government
- .info.mv – Information
- .int.mv – International Organization
- .mil.mv – Military
- .museum.mv – Museums
- .name.mv – Personal
- .net.mv – Networks
- .org.mv – Organisations
- .pro.mv – Professionals
