= SEA-ME-WE 4 =

Submarine communications cable system

- Cable type: Fibre-optic
- Construction beginning: 2004
- Construction finished: 2005
- Design capacity: 1.28 Tbit/s (2005); 2.8 Tbit/s (2010); 4.6 Tbit/s (2015)
- Lit capacity: 2.3 Tbits/s/pair (two fibre pairs)
- Owner(s): Consortium
- Website: www.seamewe4.net

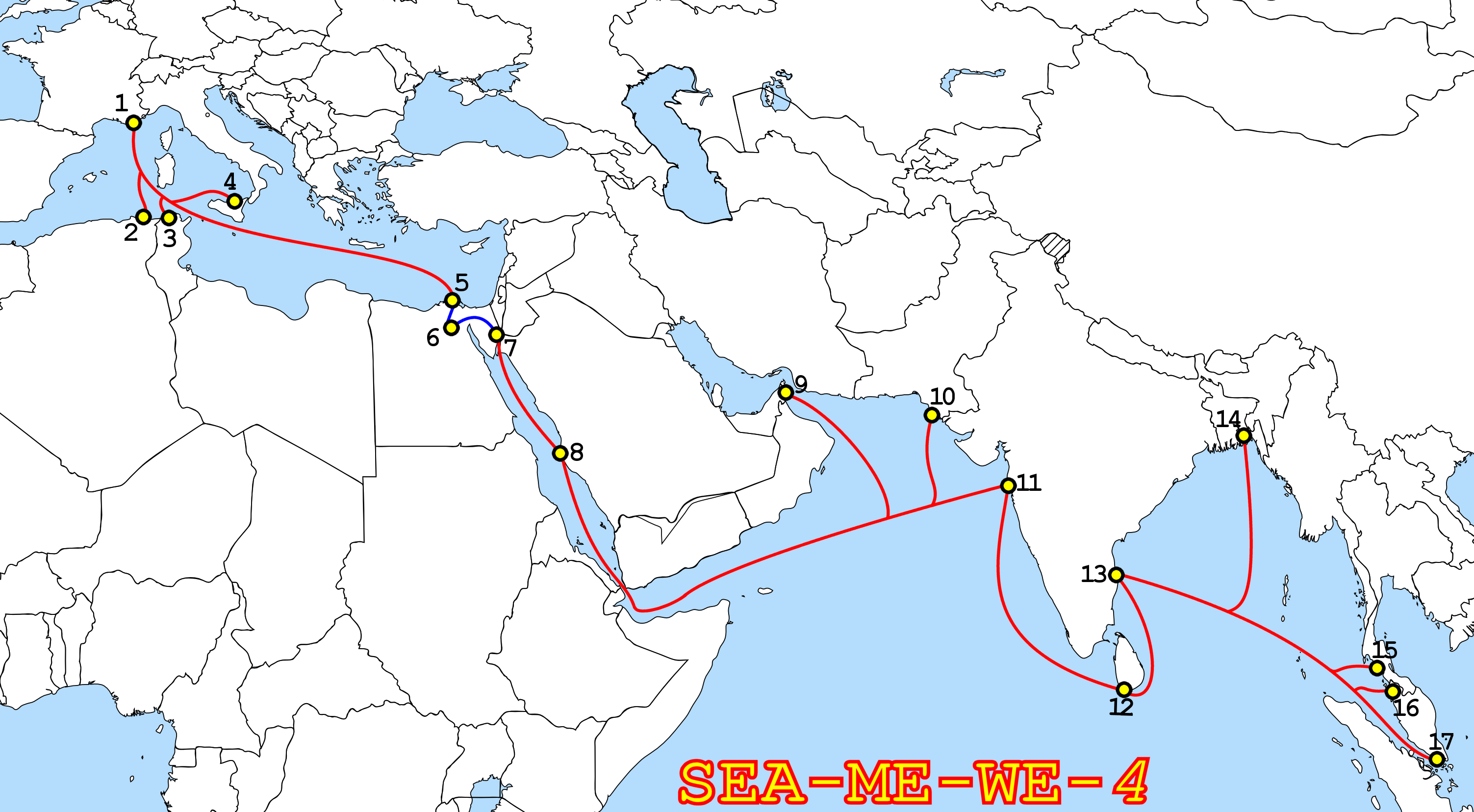
The route of the submarine cable (red); the blue segment is dy 1 6

South East Asia–Middle East–Western Europe 4 (SEA-ME-WE 4) is an optical fibre submarine communications cable system that carries telecommunications between Singapore, Malaysia, Thailand, Bangladesh, India, Sri Lanka, Pakistan, United Arab Emirates, Saudi Arabia, Egypt, Italy, Tunisia, Algeria and France.

About 18,800 kilometres long, the cable provides the primary Internet backbone between South East Asia, the Indian subcontinent, the Middle East, and Europe.

== Network topology ==
The SEA-ME-WE 4 system is divided into four segments with sixteen landing points:

=== Segments ===
- S1 - Tuas to Mumbai
- S2 - Mumbai to Suez
- S3 - Suez to Alexandria
- S4 - Alexandria to Marseille

Landing points

SEA-ME-WE 4 Landing Points
Location	Operator & Technical Partner
Marseille, France	Orange S.A.
Annaba, Algeria	Algérie Télécom
Bizerte, Tunisia	Tunisie Telecom
Palermo, Italy	Telecom Italia Sparkle
Alexandria, Egypt	Telecom Egypt
Suez, Egypt	Telecom Egypt
Jeddah, Saudi Arabia	Saudi Telecom Company
Fujairah, UAE	Etisalat by e&
Karachi, Pakistan	Pakistan Telecommunication Company Limited
Mumbai, India	Bharti Airtel / Tata Communications
Colombo, Sri Lanka	Sri Lanka Telecom
Chennai, India	Bharti Airtel / Tata Communications
Cox's Bazar, Bangladesh	Bangladesh Submarine Cable Company Limited
Satun, Thailand	National Telecom Public Company Limited
Malacca, Malaysia	Telekom Malaysia
Tuas, Singapore	Singtel

== History ==
The SEA-ME-WE 4 cable system was developed by a consortium of 16 telecommunications companies under a deal signed on 27 March 2004. It was built by Alcatel Submarine Networks (now a division of Alcatel-Lucent) and Fujitsu. The 18-month construction project was completed on 13 December 2005 at an estimated cost of US$500 million. Fujitsu built segment 1, which runs 8,000 kilometres from Singapore to India, and provided the submarine repeater equipment for Segment 4.

== Outages ==
=== 30 January 2008 ===
On 30 January 2008, Internet services were widely disrupted in the Middle East and in the Indian subcontinent following damage to the SEA-ME-WE 4 and FLAG Telecom cables in the Mediterranean Sea. Disruptions of 70 percent in Egypt, and 60 percent in India were reported along with problems in Bahrain, Bangladesh, Kuwait, Pakistan, Qatar, Saudi Arabia and United Arab Emirates. In India, small users felt the impact while ISPs could service large users who have more lucrative contracts.

While the respective contributions of the two cable systems to this blackout is unclear, network outage graphs show anomalies at 04:30 UTC and again at 08:00 UTC. The FALCON submarine communications cable was reported severed off the coast of Dubai in the Persian Gulf on 1 February 2008, making it the third over a two-day period.

Though the cause of the damage to SEA-ME-WE 4 or FLAG has not been declared by either cable operator and 12 hours of video before and after the incident show no ships being in the area, a number of sources speculate these were caused by a ship's anchor near Alexandria, while the Kuwait government attributes the breaks to "weather conditions and maritime traffic". The New York Times reported that the damage occurred to the two systems separately near Alexandria and Marseilles. The water near Alexandria is restricted and Egypt knew of "no passing ships" at the time.

For a number of days, SEA-ME-WE 3 was the only remaining cable connecting Europe to the Middle East via Egypt. Data transmission capacity between India and Europe was reduced by 75 percent, causing much of the traffic between these sites to be rerouted through the Pacific and Atlantic Oceans.

=== 19 December 2008 ===
On 19 December 2008, the cable was again severed, simultaneously with SEA-ME-WE 3, the FLAG FEA cable, and the GO-1 cable. It was expected to be operating again by 25 December.

=== 14 April 2010 shunt fault ===
On 14 April 2010 the cable had a shunt fault approximately 1,886 kilometers from Alexandria towards Palermo, Italy, on the segment between Alexandria and Marseille.

=== May 2010 fault ===
Another cable fault, disrupting the connection between Malaysia, Mumbai and Europe.

=== 5 July 2010 ===
Services between Mumbai and Mombasa were down from 9:19 GMT/5 July 2010. Services in South Africa, all regions was also experienced and rerouting was experienced. On Mweb's website it was listed as ADSL Outage number 8084.

=== 11 May 2012 fault ===
The submarine cable South East Asia-Middle East-Western Europe 4 (SeaMeWe-4) was reportedly cut near Alexandria, disrupting internet services in Pakistan. Reportedly SMW4 was cut in April 2012 too, but was restored on the same day.

=== 6 June 2012 fault ===
On this day, at around 18:30 (GMT+8), Sea-Me-We 4 had a cut near Singapore causing disruption to voice and internet services from Singapore and Malaysia to Bangladesh. Service disruption affected the eastern route into Bangladesh while western one is not affected.

=== 27 March 2013 fault ===
A cut in the segment 4 of South East Asia-Middle East-Western Europe 4 (SEA-ME-WE 4) submarine optical fiber cable on Wednesday morning (27 March 2013) has been reported leading to a degradation of internet speed by 60% in several countries including Pakistan and Egypt. A consortium of SEA-ME-WE-4 Cable System is working on the fault but they have not come up with a resolution time for this problem and confirmed nature of fault is yet to be determined

Three men were arrested for trying to cut the cable near Alexandria.

The issue was resolved on the 8 April 2013.

=== 25–28 December 2013 fault ===
Fiber cut in SMW4 segment 3 (Egypt terrestrial path). Slow internet speeds throughout Pakistan according to a tweet from a Pakistan telecom engineer.

=== 20 November - 18 December 2014 fault ===
Fiber had a fault, according to a news article. Unconfirmed reports claim that it was repaired on 18 December, although its effects were still being observed for at least several days more.

=== 19 January 2015 fault ===
According to news articles, this fiber had a technical issue. These reports claimed that this would be repaired within a week.

=== 22 October 2015 fault ===
Fiber cut in SMW4 (Algeria Path), according to a news article. "The internet access will be disrupted for several days in Algeria following a cut on a submarine cable linking Annaba (600 km east of Algiers) to Marseille ( south -eastern France), announced Thursday, October 22 Algeria Telecom in a statement". Unconfirmed reports on when it was due to be repaired, its effects were still being observed until 26 October.

=== 13-15 April 2017 fault ===
Fiber damaged in SMW4 (Algeria Path), according to a news article. "The internet access will be disrupted for several hours from Friday at 01:00 to 18:00 in Algeria following a cut on a submarine cable linking Annaba (600 km east of Algiers) to Marseille (south -eastern France). The damage caused to the landing chamber caused by the bad weather recorded on the coast of Annaba on 6 March 2016, Algeria Telecom Initiated several actions aimed at securing and protecting these installations ... ", explained the same source announced 3 days before, 12 April Algeria Telecom in a statement. These reports claimed that this would be repaired within two days. However, another report explained that the cable was still being repaired on 15 April due to some technical complications.

== Management and administration ==
The SEA-ME-WE 4 cable system was proposed and developed by the SEA-ME-WE 4 Consortium. The Consortium continues to maintain and operate the system. It comprises 16 telecommunications companies:

- Algérie Télécom, Algeria
- Bharti Infotel Limited, India
- Bangladesh Submarine Cable Company Limited (BSCCL), Bangladesh
- CAT Telecom Public Company Limited, Thailand
- Emirates Telecommunication Corporation (ETISALAT), UAE
- France Telecom - Long Distance Networks, France
- MCI, United States
- Pakistan Telecommunication Company Limited, Pakistan
- Singapore Telecommunications Limited (SingTel), Singapore
- Sri Lanka Telecom PLC (SLT), Sri Lanka
- Saudi Telecom Company (STC), Saudi Arabia
- Telecom Egypt (TE), Egypt
- Telecom Italia Sparkle S.p.A., Italy
- Telekom Malaysia Berhad (TM), Malaysia
- Tunisie Telecom, Tunisia
- Tata Communications previously Videsh Sanchar Nigam Limited (VSNL), India

The consortium is a hierarchical organisation which operates, manages and administers the cable system. At the top of the hierarchy is the Management Committee, which steers the project. Bodies subordinate to the Management Committee include the Procurement Group; Operation and Maintenance; the Financial & Administrative Subcommittee; Assignment, Routing and Restoration; and Investment and Agreement. Other bodies in the organisation are the Central Billing Party which is subordinate to the Financial & Administrative Subcommittee, and the Network Administrator which is subordinate to Assignment, Routing and Restoration.

Tata Communications previously Videsh Sanchar Nigam Limited (VSNL), India is the Network Administrator. For this purpose, Tata Comm has developed a state of the art Network Administration Software system which enables online request processing, job scheduling and report generation etc. This system will make the capacity management very efficient for bandwidth owners. This system is accessible online at http://www.seamewe4.net. Telekom Malaysia Berhad is the Central Billing Party.

== Applications ==
SEA-ME-WE 4 is used to carry "telephone, internet, multimedia and various broadband data applications". The SEA-ME-WE 3 and the SEA-ME-WE 4 cable systems are intended to provide redundancy for each other. The two cable systems are complementary, but separate, and 4 is not intended to replace 3. Both derive from the same series of projects (SEA-ME-WE), but have different emphases. SEA-ME-WE 3 is far longer at 39,000 kilometres (compare to SEA-ME-WE 4's 18,800 kilometres) and extends from Japan and Australia along the bottom of the Eurasian landmass to Ireland and Germany. SEA-ME-WE 4 has a faster rate of data transmission at 1.28 Tbit/s against SEA-ME-WE 3's 0.96 Tbit/s. SEA-ME-WE 3 provides connectivity to a greater number of countries over a greater distance, but SEA-ME-WE 4 provides far higher data transmission speeds intended to accommodate increasing demand for high-speed internet access in developing countries.

== Technologies ==
The cable uses dense wavelength-division multiplexing (DWDM), allowing for increased communications capacity per fibre compared to fibres carrying non-multiplexed signals and also facilitates bidirectional communication within a single fibre. DWDM does this by multiplexing different wavelengths of laser light on a single optical fibre so that multiple optical carrier signals can be concurrently transmitted along that fibre. Two fibre pairs are used with each pair able to carry 64 carriers at 10 Gbit/s each. This enables terabit per second speeds along the SEA-WE-ME 4 cable, with a total capacity of 1,280 Gbit/s. In February 2011 the consortium awarded contracts to upgrade submarine segments capacity to 40 Gbit/s per link, along with landing sites equipment capable of 100 Gbit/s for future needs.

On February 3, 2015 Mitsubishi Electric announced that it has completed the upgrade and the expansion of the South East Asia ─ Middle East ─ Western Europe 4 (SEA-ME-WE 4) Cable System. Mitsubishi Electric supplied its 100G MF-6900GWS Submarine Line Terminal Equipment (SLTE) with incorporated superior coherent technology for all 16 landing stations to upgrade the current 40 Gbit/s cable system to 100 Gbit/s and expand the ultimate design capacity from 2,800 Gbit/s to 4,600 Gbit/s. The new SLTE doubled the data capacity per rack and reduce power consumption per unit of data volume by 47% for each station.

== Interception ==
In August 2013 a major German newspaper claimed that an alliance of Western and Asian intelligence agencies has managed to tap into the cable. The Süddeutsche Zeitung, Germany’s largest broadsheet newspaper, wrote that GCHQ has been leading the interception effort, supported by the National Security Agency, which is GCHQ’s American equivalent. The paper cited Edward Snowden as the source of the information.

== See also ==
Several other cable systems following a substantially similar route:

- Europe-India Gateway (EIG)
- FLAG Europe Asia
- I-ME-WE
- SEA-ME-WE 5
- SEA-ME-WE 6
