= Raajjé Online =

Broadband internet service

ROL (Raajjé Online)
- Company type: Private company
- Industry: Telecommunications
- Founded: 20 February 2003
- Headquarters: Malé, Maldives
- Products: Internet; Web Hosting; Streaming audio Streaming video WiFi; P2P; IP VPN; Webcast
- Website: rol.net.mv

Raajjé Online (ROL) (Dhivehi: ރާއްޖެ އޮންލައިން) is a broadband internet service provided by Focus Infocom Private Limited.

== History ==
ROL internet services was initially delivered using fixed and wireless (nomadic/mobile) radio technology.

== Investor relations ==
- WARF Telecom International – a joint venture company formed between Ooredoo Maldives, Reliance Infocomm of India and Focus Infocom to install a Submarine fibre cable system between Maldives and India linking Maldives to the global submarine fibre cable system.

== Technical partners ==
- SingTel – Providing international Internet backbone connectivity, V-SAT and other IP services
- Ooredoo Maldives – Partner in Submarine optic Fibre Cable system and provision of microwave backhaul connectivity to islands
- Reliance Infocom (India) – Partner in the implementation of submarine optic fibre cable system
- Smart Bridges Singapore -Provision of Wireless Radio Systems
- Local cable operators – Provision of HFC network Capacity for Distribution of Internet
- Sky Pilot Networks (USA)

== See also ==
- Telecommunications in the Maldives
