= OTEGLOBE =

OTE International Solutions Single Member S.A.
- Trade name: OTEGLOBE
- Native name: ΟΤΕ Διεθνείς Λύσεις Μονοπρόσωπη Ανώνυμος Εταιρεία
- Company type: Subsidiary
- Industry: Telecommunications
- Founded: August 11, 2000; 25 years ago
- Defunct: January 2, 2023
- Fate: Merged with OTE
- Successor: OTE
- Headquarters: Marousi, Greece
- Area served: South Eastern Europe
- Key people: Dino Andreou (CEO); Michael Tsamaz (Vice president)
- Parent: OTE
- Website: oteglobe.gr

OTEGLOBE was an Athens-based network backbone operator offering telecommunication services to carriers, ISPs and business customers in Southern Europe. The organisation was a whole-owned subsidiary of OTE, the main Greek telecommunications provider. On 2 January 2023, it was absorbed by OTE, who continues using the OTEGLOBE brand.

== Network ==
OTEGLOBE operates 2 wide area networks that form the south-eastern European Internet backbone: GWEN (Greek Western European Network) and TBN (Trans Balkan Network) as well as an IP MPLS network.

GWEN is a private multi-gigabit network based on DWDM/SDH connecting Greece to major European backbone services via Italy. It is composed of 4 rings (Greek inner ring, undersea ring, Italian ring and West-European ring).

TBN forms a land-based backbone network linking Greece to the west-European backbones via Bulgaria, Romania, Hungary, Austria and the Czech Republic to the main backbone centres in Germany and the United Kingdom. The TBN is used standalone or as a backup service to GWEN.

IP MPLS Network. Based on Multi-Services Platform (MSP), a private, international IP MPLS network, as well as on numerous peering/interconnect agreements with other global carriers, OTEGLOBE offers a variety of transport and connectivity services available internationally at 14 business centers.

OTEGLOBE is a member and landing party of the Asia Africa Europe-1 (AAE-1) submarine cable.

== Services ==
OTEGLOBE offers a number of wholesale telecommunication services to high-capacity carriers and multi-site organisations:

- Capacity services (via the GWEN and TBN wide area networks)
- Data/IP services
- Voice services
