= Cyber Internet Services =

Internet service provider in Pakistan

Cyber Internet Services (Pvt.) Ltd.
- Trade name: CYBERNET
- Native name: خدمات سائبر انٹرنیٹ (خصوصی) محدود
- Type: Private
- Industry: Telecommunications
- Founded: 1996
- Headquarters: Karachi, Pakistan
- Number of locations: 26 cities
- Area served: Pakistan
- Key people: Danish Ali Lakhani (CEO); Maroof Ali Shahani (COO)
- Brands: StormFiber, RapidCompute
- Services: Carrier Ethernet; Internet Bandwidth; Leased line; Fiber Optic Solutions; MPLS VPN; Backhaul (telecommunications); Managed Services & Managed SD-WAN; Data Center and Cloud Provider Interconnect; Wholesale Voice Service
- Number of employees: 4,011 (2025)
- Website: www.cyber.net.pk

Cyber Internet Services Private Limited, typically referred to as Cybernet is a B2B Internet service provider (ISP) based in Karachi, Pakistan. It is a subsidiary of the Lakson Group.

Cybernet became a Tier-1 provider in November 2022 by launching their own submarine communications cable project called 'PEACE', connecting Pakistan to Europe, Southeast Asia, East Africa and the Middle East.

== Network ==
Cybernet peers with Equinix in Singapore and Muscat as well as with DE-CIX in Frankfurt and Marseille. They also have peering and interconnect agreements with networks in the Middle East, through Etisalat by e& and Omantel.

They own and operate the PEACE submarine cable that lands in Karachi, providing them with over 600 Gbit/s of bandwidth, which can be expanded to almost three times that amount based on its currently installed capacity of 1.6 Tbit/s.

In July 2021, Cybernet rolled out IPv6 across its network making it one of the first ISPs in Pakistan to deploy IPv6.

StormFiber - A brand of Cybernet

== Services ==
Cybernet offers various connectivity solutions such as dedicated fiber internet, data center services, web hosting and cloud computing to SMEs and large companies across Pakistan.

== Outages ==
Cybernet suffered an outage on December 1, 2019, due to a fire at its headquarters.

== Controversy ==
- Cybernet, together with Nayatel took PESCO to court for abusing its dominant position by increasing Right of Way charges by 10 times. Cybernet won the case in December 2022.
- StormFiber employees were attacked by local cable operators in Lahore

== StormFiber ==
StormFiber is Cybernet's consumer facing brand that offers Fiber-to-the-Home (FTTH) internet to residential users. They have coverage in over 2 cities across Pakistan.

It has plans ranging from 20 Mbps to 250 Mbps, as well as additional services like landline telephone and high-definition IPTV.
