= PEACE Cable =

Submarine cable project for data transmission between Asia, Europe, and Africa

- Cable type: Submarine Fibre-optic
- Construction beginning: 22 October 2018
- Construction finished: 10 November 2022
- Design capacity: Up to 24 Tbit/s (per fiber pair)
- Built by: Peace Cable International Network Co. Ltd.
- Area served: Asia, Africa, Europe
- Owner(s): Peace Cable International Network Co. Ltd.
- Website: www.peacecable.net

PEACE Cable, which stands for Pakistan and East Africa Connecting Europe, is a submarine cable project designed to facilitate data transmission between Asia, Europe, and Africa. It is owned by Peace Cable International, a subsidiary of Hengtong Group. The 15,000 km cable system is deployed along the seafloor of the Indian Ocean, the Red Sea and the Mediterranean Sea, with plans to extend the cable length to 25,000 km. It is based on WSS ROADM technology with a design capacity of 24 Tbit/s per fiber pair. The cable entered service and became fully operational in December 2022.

The main trunk connects Pakistan, Kenya, Egypt, Singapore and France but there are also branches to the Maldives, Malta, Cyprus, the Seychelles, Djibouti, Saudi Arabia and Somalia.

== Landing points and operators ==
PEACE Cable Landing Points
Location	Operator & Technical Partner
Marseille, France	Orange S.A; PCCW Global
Abu Talat, Egypt Zafarana, Egypt	Telecom Egypt
Mombasa, Kenya	Telkom Kenya; Liquid Telecom
Victoria, Seychelles	Cable & Wireless Communications Seychelles (CWS)
Haramous CLS, Djibouti	Djibouti Telecom
Berbera, Somalia	SomCable; Somtel
Mogadishu, Somalia	Hormuud Telecom
Bosaso, Somalia	Somtel
Karachi, Pakistan	Cybernet
Kulhudhuffushi, Maldives	Ooredoo Maldives
Tuas, Singapore	Singtel

=== Privately owned branches ===
Subsystems of PEACE Cable
Location	Cable Name	Owner and Operator
Geroskipou, Cyprus	ARSINOE	CYTA
Mellieħa, Malta	LaValette	GO Malta
Bizerte, Tunisia	IFRIQIYA	Ooredoo Tunisia
Jeddah, Saudi Arabia	J2M (Jeddah to Marseille)	Zain Saudi Arabia

== Incidents ==
On 4 March 2025, the PEACE cable was reported to have been cut approximately 1,450 kilometers from Zafarana, Egypt, impacting traffic to Marseille and causing significant internet disruptions across Somalia and parts of East Africa. The Somali National Communications Authority (NCA) reported slower connection speeds and reduced streaming quality, prompting local telecommunications providers to reroute traffic through backup networks to stabilize connectivity. It became the second cable concurrently affected by an outage in the Red Sea, alongside the AAE-1 cable which was cut 180 kilometers from Zafarana on 29 December 2024 and was pending full restoration amidst delays.

The cause of the breakage was not disclosed, but in recent years, multiple cable cuts in the Red Sea have been attributed to abandoned ships drifting and damaging subsea infrastructure, reportedly due to Houthi-related maritime activity in Yemeni waters.

Repairs were initially expected to take several months, with local estimates suggesting restoration might not occur until mid-April 2025 due to a global cable ship capacity crunch. Yet, the PEACE cable was restored on 26 March 2025, just three weeks after the outage began—a significantly shorter outage compared to other submarine cable interruptions in the Red Sea.
