= Michael Tsamaz =

- Born: 1959
- Occupation: Businessperson

Michael Tsamaz was the OTE Group (Hellenic Telecommunications Organisation S.A.) Chairman & CEO since November 3, 2010.

He joined OTE Group in 2001 and became Head of COSMOTE in 2007.

Since 2001, Michael Tsamaz held several senior roles within OTE, overseeing the course of its international subsidiaries. He has served as BoD member for a number of OTE & COSMOTE international subsidiaries. He also served as BoD member of EE, UK. Michael Tsamaz is also Chairman of the Board of Telekom Romania Communications S.A. He is a MoB of the Hellenic Federation of Enterprises (SEV) since July 2016 and chairs the Digital Economy Committee since November 2016. Prior to his tenure at OTE Group, he held high ranking positions in Marketing, Sales & General Management for multinational companies such as Vodafone and Philip Morris.

== Biography ==
Michael Tsamaz was born in 1959 in Kaissariani, Athens and was grown up in Aghios Dimitrios. His father worked as an engineer in a quarry. His father's origin was from Philadelphia, Asia Minor, while his mother’ roots were in Chania, Crete. Michael Tsamaz holds a degree in Business Administration from the University of New Brunswick, Canada and after the completion of his studies he returned in Greece. He is a father of two.

== Honours and awards ==
On September 27, 2013 Global Telecoms Business ranked Michael Tsamaz in the 84th place among 100 most powerful businesspersons in telecommunications sector globally. On Monday, 26 June 2023, Michael Tsamaz was awarded an Honorary Doctorate of the Department of Business Administration and Management of the University of Piraeus.
