= SomCable =

Telecommunications contractor in Somaliland

SomCable Telecommunication
- Type: Private
- Industry: Telecommunications
- Founded: 2010; 16 years ago
- Headquarters: Hargeisa, Somaliland
- Key people: Mohamed Said Guedi, founder & CEO
- Products: Internet service provider
- Website: somcable.com

Somaliland Cable abbreviated as SomCable is a private Internet service provider based in Hargeisa, capital of Somaliland. Founded in 2010 by Mohamed Aw Said, a local businessman. In 2015 Somcable became the first service provider to offer fiber optic network in Somaliland, and covers more than 1700 km. In 2010, SomCable Ltd announced that it was contracted to pull submarine cable from Djibouti port to Berbera. SomCable invested over US$100 million to complete the project which employed more than 10,000 locals workers. Funding for the project came from local businessman Mohamed Said MSG. The project will ensure that high speed wireless technology capable of delivering sufficient scalable bandwidth to residents of Somaliland is available at the site. The initiative was completed in September 2014. Somaliland is currently the only fiber operator in the country. As of October 2014, SomCable launched the first LTE solution in Somaliland, the first GEPON/FTTP solution in Somaliland. SomCable provided links to Africa-1 submarine cable a cable system, constructed by Alcatel-Lucent Submarine Networks (ASN) that links in Berbera providing internet services.

== See also ==
- Telesom
- Somtel
