= Information technology in Pakistan =

Information technology (IT) in Pakistan is a thriving industry with significant potential for growth. The Ministry of Information Technology oversees its development. Despite financial crises, the IT sector has consistently demonstrated economic success.

== Overview ==
The first IT policy and implementation strategy was approved under the leadership of Atta-ur-Rahman, the Federal Minister of Science and Technology, in August 2000. This laid the groundwork for the development of the sector. During this period, the emphasis was placed on quality IT education in universities rather than numbers.

The Telecom Policy was announced in December 2015, and later the National Digital Pakistan Policy was approved by the cabinet in May 2018.

The period from 2013 to 2018 witnessed a landmark revolution in the sector following the launch of 3G/4G technologies.

According to Bloomberg, 2021 was a record year for Pakistan's technology sector, due in part to the COVID-19 pandemic and the 2021 China tech crackdown.

Between 2022 and 2024, tech funding declined by 88%, and over 55 startups shut down or pivoted. Frequent internet shutdowns caused estimated losses of over one million dollars per hour, with the Pakistan Software Houses Association (P@SHA) saying 99% of IT firms reported service disruptions and 90% experienced financial losses. Other companies such as Google have begun to invest in Pakistan. Sajjad Mustafa Syed, chairman of P@SHA, quoted by Profit, said “the IT sector is not even recognized as an industry in Pakistan,” leading to higher input costs from tariffs and limiting growth. He added that the sector, taxed on gross revenue, lacked incentives that could otherwise attract investment and remittances. He also warned that blocking Virtual Private Networks (VPNs) was legally unjustified under the Prevention of Electronic Crimes Act (PECA), as “VPNs are tools, not content.” Hanzala Raja, the CEO of a e-commerce company said that the 2025-26 federal budget "signals a promising shift in how the government views the digital and entrepreneurial economy", stating that the recognition of the sector in the tax net suggested, per Business Recorder, "the government is beginning to take this segment seriously".

In 2025, Microsoft’s exited from Pakistan and laid off 5 of its staff in Pakistan amid international layoffs. The IT ministry said it was not an exit, moving from "on-premises software deployment to the Software-as-a-Service (SaaS) model".

== E-government ==
The Government of Pakistan has prioritized Information technology as a key component of its efforts to establish an "Information age" within the country. Significant progress has been made in developing efficient computerized e-government systems for major departments, including the police, law enforcement agencies, and district administration. The National Database and Registration Authority (NADRA) has also implemented computerized registration systems for issuing essential documents such as national identity cards, passports, and permanent residency cards. IT has played a crucial role in streamlining work procedures for the civil service and other government-related sectors.

According to a study published by the UN Economic and Social Commission for Asia and the Pacific (ESCAP), Pakistan has been highly exposed to Information Technology while pursuing the concepts of e-governance and e-commerce:

Pakistan's communication system is also reliable. This has now fully graduated into the email, Internet and IT culture perse. The country is fast exploring the brave new world of information technology and keenly assimilating the requirements of e-government and e-commerce. Information technology has opened a new business frontier for Pakistan. The government is assigning high priority to information technology both in terms of policy limelight and resource allocation.

— United Nations Economic and Social Commission for Asia and the Pacific, 2002

== Local-language computing ==
In 1994, Concept Software Pvt Ltd, an Indian software company, collaborated with Multilingual Solutions, a UK based company, to develop InPage Urdu for Pakistan's newspaper industry.

=== Urdu ===
The Center for Research in Urdu Language Processing (CRULP) conducts research and development in linguistic and computational aspects of Urdu, as well as other languages of Pakistan, in areas such as speech processing, computational linguistics and script processing.

=== Sindhi ===
Sindhi has also been digitised to make it easier to publish Sindhi newspapers, magazines and books. InPage also offers support for Sindhi with the proper fonts and ligatures which makes it easier for people to type in the Sindhi language without any difficulty.

== Software development in Pakistan ==
Software development is a rapidly growing field in Pakistan. The government has actively supported this growth through various programs that encourage software development and exports. Pakistani IT companies have successfully developed software for a wide range of businesses and services.

Locally developed software packages are available at affordable prices for schools, hospitals, supermarkets, and other organizations. Large-scale control systems, such as Enterprise Resource Planning (ERP) systems, have also been developed for use in textile, pharmaceutical, food, beverage, and other industries.

The increasing popularity of Android smartphones, tablets, and Apple iPads has significantly boosted the mobile applications development industry. With minimal capital investment, individuals can easily develop these applications from home using a personal computer and an internet connection. Educational institutions have also responded to the growing demand by offering diplomas and short courses in software and application development for young people.

== See also ==
- Arfa Software Technology Park
- Telecommunications in Pakistan
- Higher Education Commission (Pakistan)
- Internet in Pakistan
- Science and technology in Pakistan
- Supercomputing in Pakistan
