= GTA Teleguam =

Principal telecommunications company in Guam

- Industry: Telecommunications
- Products: Internet services
- Website: https://gta.net

GTA Teleguam (GTA) is the principal telecommunications company in Guam, providing telephone, cellular, internet and television services to residents of the island. The firm is based in Tamuning.

The majority owner of GTA Teleguam is the Japanese firm Advantage Partners LLP, through its private equity investment funds. Advantage completed the purchase of GTA in 2011 following approval of the deal by the United States Federal Communications Commission and the Guam Public Utilities Commission.

Ownership under Advantage Partners, LLP, ceased upon the sale to the Huntsman Family, “Huntsman Family Investments and its affiliates (“HFI”) have passed US Federal and Guam regulatory approvals and completed the acquisition of TeleGuam Holdings LLC (“GTA”) from the Fund IV series of funds served by Advantage Partners, Inc. Robert Haulbrook, GTA President and CEO said when a definitive agreement of the sale was announced in February. Huntsman Family Investments was joined by local investors in Guam at the time of the sale. The sale was completed July 26, 2017. Advantage sells to Huntsman Family Investment's.

The president and chief executive officer of GTA is Roland Certeza
