= Uztelecom =

Telephone company in Uzbekistan

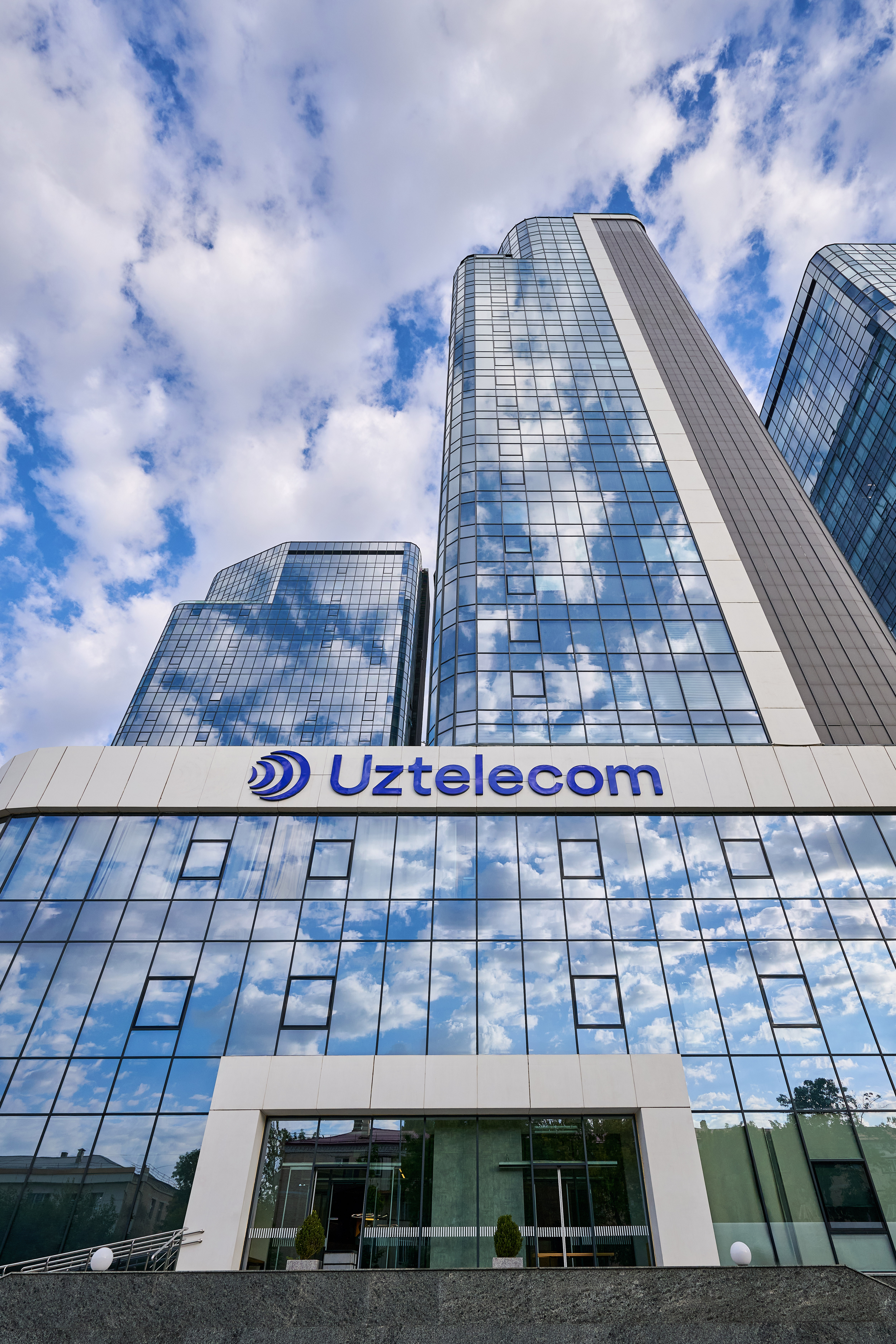
- Type: Joint stock company
- Traded as: UZTL
- ISIN: UZ7047110000
- Industry: Telecom
- Founded: 1992
- Headquarters: Uzbekistan: Tashkent, St. Muminova, 4/2
- Key people: Sherzod Shermatov (chairman); Nazirjon Khasanov (CEO)
- Services: Landline telephone; cellular; ISP; GPS
- Number of employees: 13609 (2025)
- Website: www.uztelecom.uz

Uztelecom is a telecommunications operator in Uzbekistan, providing mobile communications, broadband Internet access, fixed-line and IP telephony, digital television, leased communication channels, hosting, and other services. Today, the company positions itself as a universal digital platform and a developer of solutions in cloud technologies, video surveillance, OTT services, data centers, and cybersecurity.

== History ==
In 1992, the concern of state telecommunications enterprises of Uzbekistan - "Uzbektelecom" was created.

In 1997, the Ministry of Communications of the Republic of Uzbekistan was abolished, and the Uzbekistan Post and Telecommunications Agency was established on its basis. To separate the management of local and international networks, the joint-stock companies “Mahalliy Telecom” and “Xalqaro Telecom” were established. In 2000, they became part of the Uzbektelecom joint-stock company.

From 1997 to 2000, joint-stock companies such as Tashkent City Telephone Network, Tashkent Telecom, Andijan Telecom, Namangan Telecom, Karakalpak Telecom, Bukhara Telecom, Navoi Telecom, Khorezm Telecom, Fergana Telecom and others were established in the regions of the republic. In 2001, they were merged into the Uzbektelecom joint-stock company as branches.

In 2001, the Cabinet of Ministers of Uzbekistan decided to merge the subsidiary company UzNet with Uztelecom, which marked the beginning of preparations for the company's privatization.

In 2003, Uzbektelecom launched a CDMA-450 wireless radio communication network. For these purposes, the company Uzbektelecom Mobile was established, which also became a branch of Uzbektelecom. The network was first deployed in Jizzakh and Samarkand regions, and then in other regions.

Between 2004 and 2005, the company modernized its VoIP gateway (IP telephony), which expanded international and long-distance communication services.

In 2007, the telecommunications network was modernized in cooperation with the China Development Bank and Huawei Technologies. Agreements on the modernization of the telecommunications network in Uzbekistan were also reached with the Chinese companies Huawei Technologies and ZTE Corporation in 2009, and 2022.

In 2011, the company reported that the coverage level of the digital telecommunications network in the regions and cities of Uzbekistan reached 100%, and in rural settlements, 95.7%. In the same year, the company underwent a rebranding, resulting in the introduction of a new logo and slogan (“National Operator”), the new general brand UZTELECOM, as well as sub-brands UZMOBILE (mobile and fixed communication services based on the CDMA-450 standard) and UZONLINE (IP telephony, internet, and other services for the retail sector).

In 2014, a national mobile operator was established on the basis of the Uzmobile branch. In 2015, UZMOBILE launched the GSM standard network.

In 2022, the national operator UZTELECOM covered all lines of the Tashkent Metro with mobile communication and internet. In 2023, the company's shares were listed on the stock exchange through an IPO.

== Activity ==
Uztelecom provides a comprehensive range of telecommunications and digital services, from traditional mobile communications to cloud infrastructure.

Uztelecom provides mobile communication services based on GSM, UMTS, LTE, and 5G standards. In 2023, the company expanded its 5G network across Uzbekistan, and in 2024, it reported that all regional centers of the republic had been covered by its 5G network. At ICTWEEK Uzbekistan 2024, Uzmobile launched its 5.5G network.

Wired Internet access is provided using GPON, FTTx, and Wi-Fi technologies, while fixed wireless access (FWA) is provided through 4G/5G routers. In 2025, UZTELECOM introduced a fixed broadband access service with speeds of up to 10 Gbit/s.

In addition, the company provides:

- Interactive television (IPTV) and digital OTT services.
- Fixed-line communications, SIP/IP telephony, virtual PBX services, and toll-free 8-800 numbers.
- Data center services: colocation, CDN, hosting, and domain registration.
- Leased communication channels (IPLC/NPLC) and dedicated lines, private networks (VPN), satellite communications, and traffic transit.
- Video surveillance, smart home solutions, M2M/IoT platforms, cybersecurity, software development, and infrastructure solutions for IT companies.

In 2021, the company introduced personal and corporate cloud storage services for storing, synchronizing, and sharing files. In 2023, the company launched a multimedia OTT platform that provides access to television channels, films, and series from any device via the Internet. In 2025, the company launched a cloud platform. The platform provides computing resources, virtual servers, and data storage services for businesses and government organizations.

The company operates a network of more than 1,500 operators, handling up to 200,000 inquiries per day. In addition to serving the operator’s subscribers, the unit provides outsourced services to businesses and government agencies and supports the operation of the Virtual Reception of the President of Uzbekistan, the Unified Portal of Interactive Public Services (EPIGU), and hotlines of key government agencies. In 2024–2025, the center’s infrastructure became the technological foundation for the national unified emergency response service 112, which centrally integrated calls to all emergency services across the country.

Uztelecom has roaming agreements with 216 operators in 119 countries worldwide. The company has points of presence (PoPs) in Frankfurt, Moscow, and Hong Kong. The company is a member of the Regional Commonwealth in the Field of Communications (RCC) and participates in the Council of Telecommunication and Information Technology Operators of the CIS countries. In August 2025, Uztelecom joined the United Nations Global Compact, an international corporate responsibility initiative focused on human rights and labor standards.

== Branches ==
JSC “Uzbektelecom” comprises six regional branches, two specialized branches, and one subsidiary:

- The Central Branch, located in Tashkent, serves the capital city and the Tashkent Region.
- The Northern Branch, located in the city of Nukus, serves the Karakalpakstan and Khorazm Region.
- The Western Branch, located in Bukhara, serves Bukhara and Navoiy Regions.
- The Southwestern Branch, located in Samarkand, serves Samarkand, Jizzakh, and Sirdaryo Regions.
- The Southern Branch, located in the city of Qarshi, serves Qashqadaryo and Surxondaryo Regions.
- The Eastern Branch, located in Fergana, serves the territory of the Fergana Valley, including Fergana, Andijan, and Namangan Regions.
- The Technical Maintenance and Skills Hub, located in Tashkent, provides comprehensive support for the company's operations, including building automation and management, quality control, and the development of innovative digital products.
- The Specialized Technical Branch, located in Tashkent, is responsible for the centralized management and monitoring of telecommunications networks, as well as their construction, modernization, and maintenance.
- Telecom Soft is a subsidiary of Uzbektelecom responsible for the operation of the company's digital infrastructure, billing, data centers, and information security systems. The company also develops its own products, ranging from biometric services such as FacePay to cloud solutions and business management platforms.

== Key indicators ==
According to the company’s 2025 annual report:

- The total number of broadband Internet subscribers reached 2.4 million at the end of 2025;
- The total number of mobile communications users reached 9.2 million;
- The total number of active users on the Telecom TV platform reached 800,000;
- The total length of fiber-optic communication lines across the country reached 300,000 km;
- The capacity of the backbone communications network reached 70 Tbit/s;
- The capacity of the international packet switching center is 4,200 Gbit/s.

== Awards and certificates ==
The Uztelecom data center in Kokand holds a Tier III Design certification.

Uztelecom received awards at the international CC-Global Awards for accelerating Uzbekistan’s digital development and for launching 5G projects. In 2026, CC-Global Awards named Uztelecom the best operator in the CIS countries.

In June 2026, the international rating agency Fitch Ratings affirmed Uztelecom’s credit rating at BB and revised the company’s rating outlook from “Stable” to “Positive”, following a similar revision of Uzbekistan’s sovereign rating.

On July 22, 2026, Sustainable Fitch, an international analytical firm specializing in sustainability and environmental development, affirmed the company’s ESG Rating at “2” (on a scale of “1” to “5”, with “1” being the highest rating) and increased its ESG Score to 77 (on a scale of 0 to 100).

Uzbektelecom holds the following international ISO management system certifications: ISO 9001:2015 for quality management; ISO 37001:2016 for anti-bribery management; ISO 27001:2022 for information security management; ISO 14001:2015 for environmental management; ISO 45001:2018 for occupational health and safety management; and ISO 50001:2018 for energy management.
