= National Cyber Crimes Investigation Agency =

Cyber Crimes Investigation Agency in Pakistan

National Cyber Crime Investigation Agency (NCCIA) نمایندگی قومی تحقیقات جرایم سائبری
- Abbreviation: NCCIA

Agency overview
- Formed: 3 May 2024; 2 years ago
- Preceding agency: Cyber Crime Wing Federal Investigation Agency

Jurisdictional structure
- Operations jurisdiction: Pakistan
- Legal jurisdiction: As per operations jurisdiction
- Governing body: Government of Pakistan

Operational structure
- Headquarters: Islamabad
- Agency executive: Syed Ali Nasir Rizvi PSP, Director General
- Parent agency: Ministry of Interior

Website
- https://www.nccia.gov.pk/

National Cyber Crime Investigation Agency (NCCIA; Urdu: نمایندگی قومی تحقیقات جرایم سائبری) is a specialized agency established by the Government of Pakistan on 3 May 2024 to investigate cyber crime within the country. The agency replaced the Cybercrime Wing of the Federal Investigation Agency (FIA).

== History ==
In December 2023, Umar Saif, then Caretaker Federal Minister for Information Technology and Telecommunications, announced plans to create the National Cyber Crime Investigation Agency (NCCIA) with the intention to replace the Cybercrime Wing of the FIA.

On 3 May 2024, Attaullah Tarar, Federal Minister for Information also announced the government's plan on establishing an agency "to safeguard the digital rights of people and counter propaganda and rumours on social media." The same day, the NCCIA was formally established under Section 51 of the Prevention of Electronic Crimes Act 2016 (PECA), leading to the cessation of the Cybercrime Wing of the FIA.

The FIA cyber wing has been merged into NCCIA including transfer of all cases within the wing.

== Jurisdiction ==
The National Cyber Crime Investigation Agency (NCCIA) operates across the Pakistan.

== Notable operations ==
On 11 June 2025, The NCCIA in collaboration with the PTA conducted two successful enforcement operations targeting illegal IMEI tampering and the sale of cloned or patched mobile devices in Gujranwala.

On 29 June 2025, In a significant development, the National Cybercrime Investigation Agency (NCCIA) has arrested two suspects involved in committing Rs20 billion online fraud in Multan. while efforts are in progress to arrest a third .They allegedly persuaded citizens into investing in fake trading schemes by promising lucrative returns, eventually deceiving residents of South Punjab out of billions.

On 7 July 2025, NCCIA officers arrested 149 people, including 78 Pakistanis, 48 Chinese nationals, 8 Nigerians, 4 Filipinos, 2 Sri Lankans, 6 Bangladeshis, 2 Myanmar nationals and 1 Zimbabwean national, during a raid on a factory in the city of Faisalabad, in what authorities are calling a major blow against a transnational cybercrime syndicate. The group allegedly ran a large-scale online fraud operation involving hacking, Ponzi schemes, and investment scams targeting the general public.

In November 2025, it was reported that the NCCIA corruption scandal in Pakistan involved 13 officers who took about Rs 15 million every month from 15 illegal call centers, mostly run by foreigners in Rawalpindi and Islamabad. These officers, including senior staff like Additional Directors and Sub Inspectors, accepted bribes in exchange for letting the call centers continue operating, even though they were involved in cyber scams. The scandal also included incidents of torture and ransom demands from foreign workers who were detained. From September 2024 to April 2025, the total amount of bribes collected was around Rs 120 million, with more money taken later. The Federal Investigation Agency (FIA) began investigating, filed cases under anti-corruption laws, and arrested some officers, while others went missing. This scandal greatly harmed the reputation of the NCCIA and revealed serious corruption within the organization.

During November 2026, the National Cyber Crime Investigation Agency (NCCIA) of Pakistan conducted several operations against suspected cybercrime networks across the country, targeting fraudulent call centres, online harassment, blackmail and other digital offences. One of the most significant operations took place in Karachi, where the agency raided Voxtron Solutions, a call centre located near Shahrah-e-Faisal, arresting 273 individuals and seizing 339 laptops, 152 mobile phones and four computers. The operation was reportedly linked to an alleged international financial fraud network targeting foreign nationals through impersonation, identity misuse and caller ID spoofing. The reported arrests are also said to have included the company's founders, Syed Asim Shamsi and Syed Usman Shamsi. Meanwhile, their younger brother, Syed Asad Shamsi, alleged to be a co-founder of Tyfora Digital Agency in Taxes. In a separate operation in Lahore, eight suspects were arrested for allegedly operating an illegal call centre involved in fraudulent telecommunications campaigns targeting British citizens.

== Reception ==
Following the establishment of NCCIA, DAWN in its editorial questioned the creation of NCCIA and expressed concerns about the potential ramifications. DAWN's editorial highlighted worries that NCCIA, tasked with handling offenses under the PECA Ordinance, might intensify surveillance and data collection practices, potentially infringing on citizens' personal liberties under the pretext of security. The editorial also feared that NCCIA's objective could be to tighten control over social media and empower crackdowns on activists, dissidents, and journalists critical of state policies.

== Director Generals ==
Director Generals
S.No	Name	Tenure Start	Tenure End	Ref.
1	Waqar Uddin Syed	8 April 2025	28 October 2025	
2	Syed Khurram Ali	28 October 2025	16 September 2026	
3	Syed Ali Nasir Rizvi	16 September 2026	Till Date	

== See also ==
- National cyber crime investigation agency corruption scandal
