= Africa-1 =

Submarine communications cable system

- Cable type: Submarine Fibre-optic
- Construction beginning: 3 February 2021
- Design capacity: 96 Tbit/s (12 Tbit/s per fiber pair)
- Built by: Alcatel-Lucent Submarine Networks (ASN)
- Area served: Africa, Asia, Middle East, and Europe

Africa-1 is a 10,000 km long international submarine telecommunications cable system from France to the Middle East, through Africa.

The cable system, consisting of 8 fiber pairs, has a design capacity of 96 Tbit/s and will be constructed by Alcatel-Lucent Submarine Networks (ASN), utilizing their Alcatel 1620 Softnode transmission equipment to allow optical transmission rates between 100 and 400 Gbit/s per line card.

A consortium of members signed an agreement in December 2018 for construction and maintenance of the cable. It is expected to become fully operational in 2025.

== Cable ownership ==
Africa-1 is owned by a consortium of the following members, with more members expected to join as the cable extends to new destinations in Africa.

- Etisalat by e&
- Algérie Télécom
- Zain Omantel International (ZOI)
- G42
- Mobily
- Telecom Egypt
- PTCL

Africa-1 Cable Map

== Landing points and operators ==
Africa-1 lands in France, Kenya, Egypt, Djibouti, Saudi Arabia, United Arab Emirates, Pakistan and Somaliland. The next phase of the cable will include landings in Italy, Algeria, Tunisia, Sudan, as well as Yemen, Somalia, Tanzania and Mozambique.

Africa-1 Landing points
Location	Operator & Technical Partner
Marseille, France	Orange S.A
Port Said, Egypt	Telecom Egypt
Ras Ghareb, Egypt	Telecom Egypt
Duba, Saudi Arabia	Mobily
Mokha, Yemen	TeleYemen
Djibouti City, Djibouti	Djibouti Telecom
Kalba, UAE	Etisalat by e&
Karachi, Pakistan	Pakistan Telecommunication Company Limited
Berbera, Somaliland	SomCable
Mombasa, Kenya	Airtel Africa
