= Bangladesh Submarine Cables PLC =

Telecommunications infrastructure company

Bangladesh Submarine Cables PLC বাংলাদেশ সাবমেরিন কেবলস পিএলসি
- The logo used by BSCCL
- Founded: July 2008
- Headquarters: Dhaka, Bangladesh
- Products: Telecommunications services, Submarine cable operator
- Revenue: ▲US$30 million (2020)
- Net income: ▲US$17 million (2020)
- Owner: Government of Bangladesh
- Website: www.bsccl.com

Bangladesh Submarine Cables PLC (BSCPLC) is a fiber optic submarine cable telecommunications company and telecommunications service provider (IIG and ISP) based in Bangladesh. Emerging in July 2008 BSCPLC presently handles Bangladesh's two submarine cables as a member of the SEA-ME-WE 4 and SEA-ME-WE 5 international submarine cable consortiums. SEA-ME-WE4 cable runs a total length of 18,800 km through 17 landing points in Singapore, Malaysia, Thailand, Bangladesh, India, Sri Lanka, Pakistan, United Arab Emirates, Saudi Arabia, Egypt, Tunisia, Italy, Algeria and France.

It is also a party of the new submarine cable under the SEA-ME-WE-5 consortium and the company's new station has been built in Kuakata, Patuakhali. Its main office is located at Dhaka.

Presently, BSCPLC is providing submarine cable bandwidth for different routes and different capacities to the International Internet Gateway (IIG) and large corporate clients in Bangladesh. It has also got the license for IIG and ISP operations in Bangladesh.
