= TWA-1 =

Submarine communications cable system

TW1
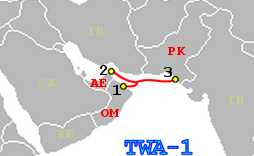
- Owners: Transworld Associates
- Operator: Transworld Associates
- Total length: 1,300 km
- Design capacity: 1.28 Tbit/s
- Technology: DWDM
- Date of first use: 2006
- Website: www.tw1.com

TW1 is a 1,300 km submarine telecommunications cable linking the United Arab Emirates, Oman, and Pakistan. It is owned and operated by Pakistani Tier-1 provider, Transworld Associates.

The cable uses DWDM technology with two fiber pairs and has a design capacity of 1.28 Tbit/s. In 2016, Transworld contracted Huawei Marine (HMN) to add 3x additional 100 Gbit/s wavelengths to the TW1 cable system.

== Landing points and operators ==
TW1 Cable Landing Points
Location	Operator & Technical Partner
Karachi, Pakistan	Transworld Associates
Fujairah, UAE	Etisalat by e&
Al Seeb, Oman	Omantel
