= SEA-ME-WE 5 =

Submarine communications cable system

- Cable type: Submarine Fibre-optic
- Predecessor: SEA-ME-WE, SEA-ME-WE 2, SEA-ME-WE 3, SEA-ME-WE 4
- Successor: SEA-ME-WE 6
- Construction beginning: 24 September 2014
- Construction finished: 15 December 2016
- Design capacity: 36.6 Tbit/s (12.2 Tbit/s per fiber pair)
- Area served: South East Asia, Middle East Asia, Western Europe
- Owner(s): Consortium
- Website: seamewe5.com

South East Asia–Middle East–Western Europe 5 (SEA-ME-WE 5) is an optical fibre submarine communications cable system that carries telecommunications between Singapore and France.

The cable is approximately 20,000 kilometres long and provides broadband communications with a design capacity of 24 Tbit/s (over 3 fiber pairs) between South East Asia, the Indian subcontinent, the Middle East and Europe.

The portion from France to Sri Lanka was constructed by Alcatel-Lucent Submarine Networks (ASN) and the portion from Sri Lanka to Singapore by NEC. Construction commenced on 6 June 2014 and completed in December 2016. An official launch event was held in Honolulu, Hawaii on 16 January 2017.

The design capacity was upgraded from 24 Tbit/s to 36.6 Tbit/s in September 2019 using Ciena's GeoMesh Extreme 300G technology.

== Landing points and operators ==
SEA-ME-WE 5 Cable Landing Points
Location	Operator & Technical Partner
Toulon, France	Orange S.A.
Catania, Italy	Telecom Italia Sparkle
Marmaris, Turkey	Turk Telekom
Abu Talat, Egypt Zafarana, Egypt	Telecom Egypt
Yanbu, Saudi Arabia	Saudi Telecom Company
Al Hudaydah, Yemen	TeleYemen
Haramous CLS, Djibouti	Djibouti Telecom
Qalhat, Oman	Ooredoo Oman
Fujairah, UAE	du EITC
Karachi, Pakistan	Transworld Associates
Matara, Sri Lanka	Sri Lanka Telecom
Ngwe Saung, Myanmar	Myanma Posts and Telecommunications
Kuakata, Bangladesh	Bangladesh Submarine Cable Company Limited
Medan, Indonesia Dumai, Indonesia	Telkom Indonesia
Malacca, Malaysia	Telekom Malaysia Berhad
Tuas, Singapore	Singtel

== Incidents ==
=== November 2022 ===
In November 2022, it was reported that SEA-ME-WE 5 was damaged on land near one of its landing stations in Egypt. This caused significant traffic disruptions lasting several hours to many countries across Africa, Asia and the Middle East.

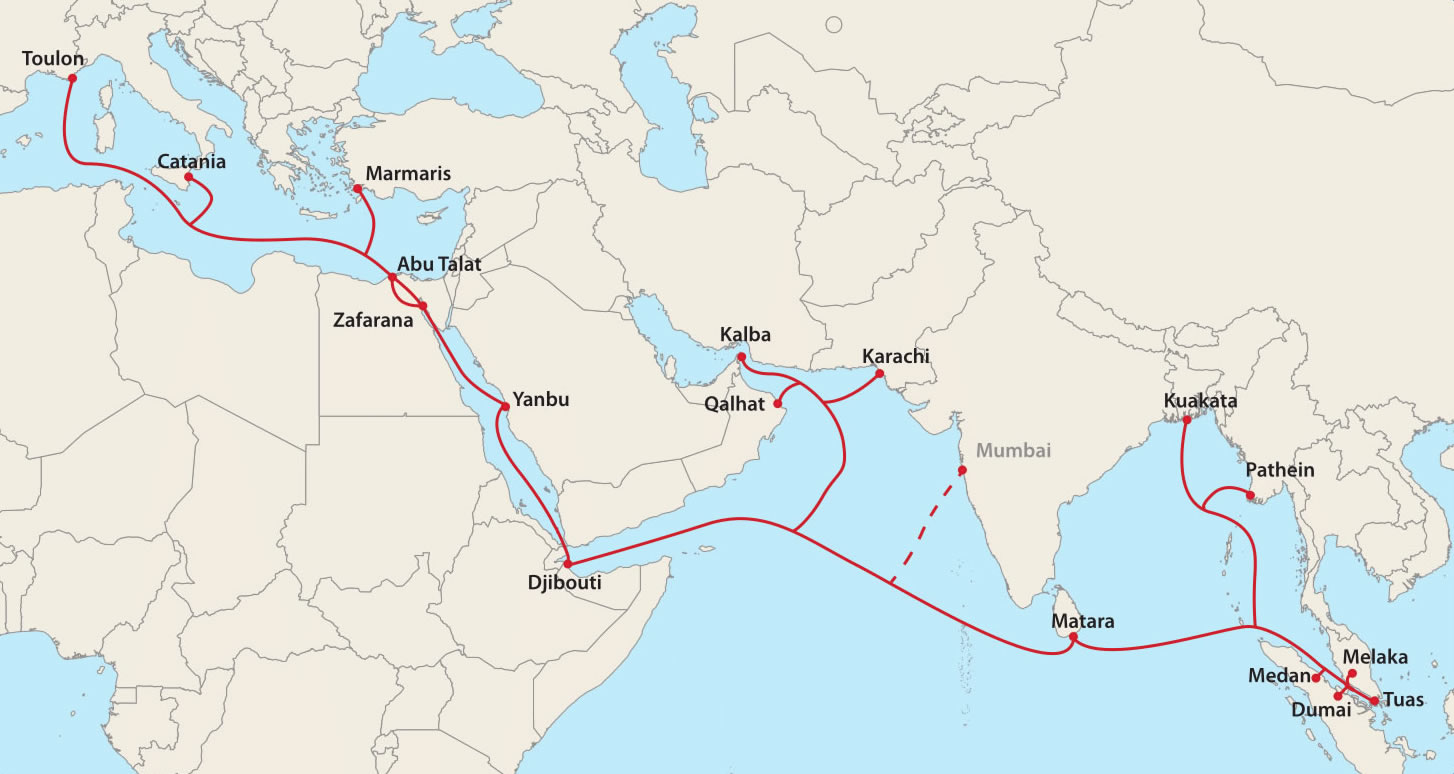
Main route

=== April 2024 ===
In April 2024, the SEA-ME-WE 5 cable developed a fault in the Strait of Malacca due to water penetrating the insulation of the cable, causing a short circuit which led to a complete loss of communication. As a result, connectivity was lost between Kuakata, Bangladesh and the final landing point in Tuas, Singapore. The fault led to Bangladesh losing 1.7 Tbps of international capacity, reducing the country’s internet capacity by approximately a third.

The cable was reported to have been repaired on June 28, following lengthy delays related to Indonesia's preferential cabotage policy and administrative procedures.

=== November 2026 ===
On 18 November 2026, a fault was discovered on the SEA-ME-WE 5 cable, 11 kilometers off the coast of Karachi. This caused a significant reduction in international bandwidth capacity for Pakistan resulting in connectivity issues and degraded quality of service. The landing partner, Transworld Associates is working with the SMW5 consortium to determine the cause of the issue.

== See also ==
- SEA-ME-WE 6
