= Universal Mobile Systems =

mobiuz
- Type: Private limited (OOO)
- Industry: Telecommunications
- Founded: 2014
- Headquarters: Tashkent, Uzbekistan
- Key people: Dmitriy Nagorniy as a CEO
- Products: Mobile networks
- Parent: MTS (former), OOO «UMS» (current)
- Website: mobi.uz

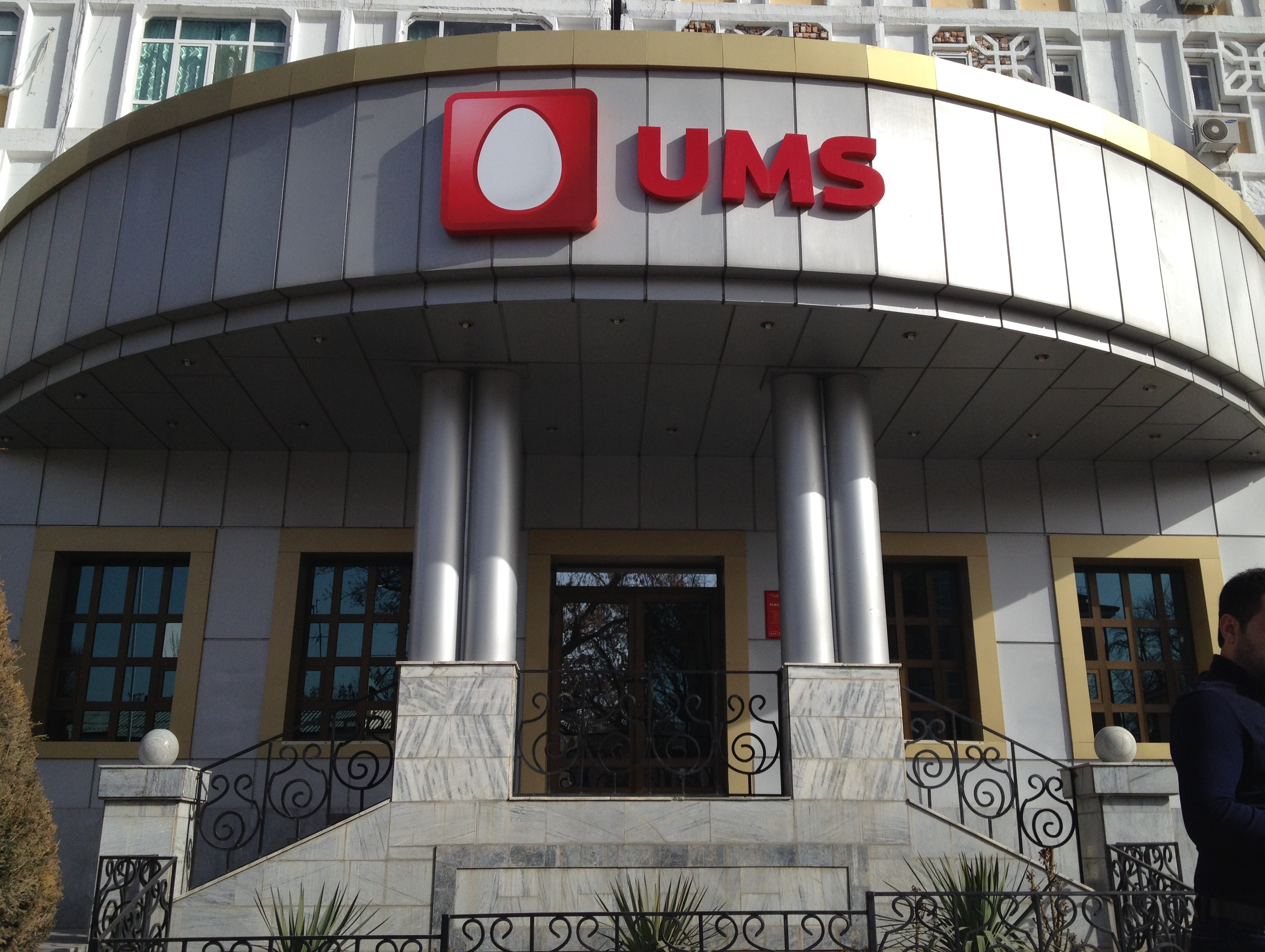
UMS general office

Universal Mobile Systems (UMS), dba mobiuz, is an Uzbek–Russian telecommunications company and a mobile network operator in Uzbekistan. In 2019, UMS was rebranded as Mobiuz.

UMS was owned by MTS (МТС), until the summer of 2012, when law enforcement authorities of Uzbekistan suspected embezzlement and tax evasion from the parent telecommunications company. According to the settlement agreement, MTS has a stake in 50.01% of the share capital of UMS, the remaining share is transferred to the Republican State Unitary Enterprise Center for Radio Broadcasting and Television, which was administered by the State Committee of Communication of Uzbekistan. The joint venture will work on the infrastructure of Uzdunrobita, a former subsidiary of MTS in the country.

== Awards ==
- 29 September 2018 — Awarded for the best stand design at ICT Expo-2018.
- 23 September 2017 – Awarded for the best information support of the stand at ICT Expo-2017.

== See also ==
- MTS (telecommunications)
- Internet in Uzbekistan
