= Ucell =

- Company type: Private
- Industry: Telecommunications
- Headquarters: Tashkent, Uzbekistan
- Area served: Uzbekistan
- Products: Cellular network, mobile broadband
- Owner: Republic of Uzbekistan
- Website: www.ucell.uz

Ucell (Uzbek: Ucell) is the largest mobile network brand in Uzbekistan, owned and operated by the Uzbek company COSCOM, itself owned by State Committee of the Republic of Uzbekistan for Assistance to Privatized Enterprises and Development of Competition (a governmental authority of Uzbekistan). The Ucell network offers mobile telephony and mobile internet services in Uzbekistan using GSM, UMTS, HSPA, LTE and 5G technologies.

Ucell was established in 1996 under the brand Coscom. Telia Company became the majority owner in 2007 and the company changed its name into Ucell in 2008. On 5 December 2018, Telia Company sold its interest in Ucell to the State Committee of the Republic of Uzbekistan for Assistance to Privatized Enterprises and Development of Competition, a governmental authority of Uzbekistan, for a price corresponding to $215 million on a debt free basis. On this date company has roughly 1,250 employees and 7.1 million subscribers. Ucell's 2G network covers approximately 97% of Uzbekistan and its 3G network covers roughly 60% of the country.

On 29 September 2021, COSCOM MCHJ, together with USM Telecom and MegaFon, concluded the establishment phase of Digital Holding joint venture.
