= Shunt fault =

A shunt fault is a type of fault that occurs in submarine communications cables.

Many such cables use underwater repeaters or amplifiers to boost signals being passed along the cable. These repeaters or amplifiers are powered from either end of the cable using Power Feed Equipment. This is achieved by applying a voltage to the metallic (usually copper or aluminium) core of the cable that surrounds the optical fiber.

Both ends usually share the current generation with one end providing a positive voltage and the other a negative voltage. A virtual ground point exists roughly halfway along the cable under normal operation. The amplifiers or repeaters derive their power from the potential difference drop across them.

A shunt fault occurs when the cable insulation becomes damaged, such that there is a short circuit from the metallic core to the seawater directly. In this situation, the apparent location of the virtual ground will move to the shunt fault location. As long as the power feed equipment furthest from the shunt fault has the capability of generating the additional voltage required to maintain the same current, the cable system will continue to carry traffic.

This damage can be from ship anchors, fishing trawlers, backhoe dredgers, currents dragging the cable along the sea floor, or even sea creatures.

A repair will be scheduled at a convenient time whilst the cable continues to operate.
