= Ooredoo Maldives =

Costomer Service in the Maldives

- Formerly: Wataniya Maldives
- Type: Public company
- Industry: Telecommunications
- Founded: August 2005; 21 years ago as Wataniya Maldives; December 2013; 12 years ago as Ooredoo Maldives
- Headquarters: Hulhumale' Maldives
- Key people: Khalid Al-Hamadi (CEO); Khalid Al-Hamadi (M.D.)
- Products: GSM, 3G, 4G LTE, 5G, Digital Financial Services & Ecommerce
- Revenue: ▲US$115,888,457 (2021); US$111,738,003 (2020)
- Number of employees: 370+ full time
- Parent: Ooredoo
- Website: ooredoo.mv

Ooredoo Maldives (formerly Wataniya Maldives) is a mobile operator in the Maldives, owned by Ooredoo Group.

== History ==
The firm was issued a licence as the new mobile phone operator in February 2005. Ooredoo Maldives was selected after a bidding process with three other companies. All the bidders proposed competitive tariffs, but Ooredoo Maldives was investing heavily to deliver new services in the fastest possible time thus succeeded the competition. Currently they are providing GSM services throughout Maldives, with other value-added services. Ooredoo Maldives were the first operator to launch the first ever and fastest 3G and 4G Networks in the Maldives, and continued this trend by recently demonstrating the highest ever seen speeds in the country through 5G.

Registered as a service provider in GCC, Ooredoo is a leading mobile phone operator in the Middle East and North Africa. It is proven that Ooredoo is currently serving a total of more than three million customers in Asia.

Ooredoo Maldives is the sole competitor of Dhiraagu, the very first Maldivian telecommunications company. Dhiraagu dominated the market for a period of 17 years, being the only operator for that period.

On 20 September 2021, Ooredoo Maldives was named as the title sponsor of 2021 SAFF Championship, a biennial international football tournament in South Asia.

== Current standing ==
The company is part of the Ooredoo Group, an international telecommunications service provider with a customer base of over 138 Million spread across 10 countries as at 31 December 2016. The "Ooredoo" brand has been valued at US$3.1 Billion and recognised among the world's top fifty most valuable telecommunications brand by the leading intangible asset valuation consultancy, Brand Finance, in their "Telecoms 500 2017" report published on 27 February 2017.

== Technological innovations ==
Ooredoo Maldives were the first operator to launch the first ever and fastest 3G and 4G Networks in the Maldives, and continued this trend by recently demonstrating the highest ever seen speeds in the country through 5G.

On 1 April 2019, Ooredoo Maldives announced the rollout of HD Voice in the nation – an advanced telecommunication service enabled through Voice Over LTE (VoLTE) Services. Following this, in June 2019, Ooredoo Maldives enabled eSIM services and WiFi Calling in December 2019 for the very first time in the Maldives. To meet the evolving needs of its customers, Ooredoo Maldives continues to introduce new services.

== Governance ==
Board of directors

The members of Ooredoo Maldives's board of directors are as follows:

Name	Position
Mr. Khalid Hasaan M. A. Al-Hamadi	Executive Director/chief executive officer & managing director
Ms. Fatima Sultan R S Al-Kuwari	Chairperson/ Independent, non-executive director
Mr. George Bowring Challenor	Independent, non-executive director
Mr. Vikram Sinha	Independent, non-executive director
Ms. Dheena Hussain	Independent, non-executive director
Ms. Fareeha Shareef	Independent, non-executive director
Mr. Suresh Kalpathi Chidambaram	Non-Independent, Executive Director
Ms. Moza Mohd A Y Darwish	Independent, non-executive director

Senior Management |The members of Ooredoo Maldives's Senior Management are as follows:

Name	Position
Mr. Khalid Hasaan M. A. Al-Hamadi	chief executive officer & managing director
Mr. Suresh Kalpathi Chidambaram	chief financial officer
Mr. Bassam Mohd S H Al-Momani	Chief Technology Officer
Mr. Hussain Niyaz	Chief Commercial Officer
Ms. Fazna Mansoor	Human Resources Director
Mr. Shabeen Ali	Director Operations
Mr. Hussain Zareer	Director Finance

Khalid Al-Hamadi is the CEO of Ooredoo Maldives, since February 2022 and is a Non-Independent, executive director. He is also the managing director of the Company effective from February 2022.

== See also ==
- Telecommunications in the Maldives
