= Transworld Associates =

Internet service provider in Pakistan

Transworld Associates (TWA)
- Trade name: Trans World Associates (Pvt.) Limited
- Type: Joint venture
- Industry: Telecommunications
- Founded: October 1, 1980; 46 years ago
- Headquarters: Islamabad, Pakistan
- Area served: Pakistan
- Key people: Javed Saifullah Khan (Founder & First Chairman); Saad Muzaffar Waraich (President)
- Brands: Transworld Home
- Services: Tier 1 network; Peering; Internet transit; Data center; Broadband; Internet; IPTV; Telephone
- Number of employees: 900+ (2024)
- Website: www.tw1.com

Transworld Associates is a Tier-1 provider based in Pakistan serving as a backbone for IP connectivity in Pakistan. It is a joint-venture between Orastar Limited and the Oman based OMZEST Group. Transworld owns and operates the 1,300 km submarine communications cable named TW1 that links Pakistan to the United Arab Emirates and Oman.

In addition to operating TW1, Transworld is also a consortium member of the SEA-ME-WE 5 submarine cable and maintains the landing point for the cable in Karachi, Pakistan.

== History ==
Transworld Associates was incorporated as a private company in Pakistan in October 1980. It was a subsidiary of Orascom Investment Holdings (OIH) S.A.E. In January 2022, OIH divested its shareholding to Orastar Limited. As of September 2023, Orastar Limited holds 90% shareholding in the company with the remaining 10% owned by H.E. Dr. Omar Zawawi, the Chairman of OMZEST Group.

== Network ==
Transworld is the only operator in Pakistan which fully owns its submarine cable, TW1. They are also the consortium partner in SEA-ME-WE 5 and the upcoming SEA-ME-WE 6 and 2Africa cables.

TW peers with DE-CIX in Frankfurt, Germany over a 100G link and Equinix in Singapore over a 600G link. They also have peering and interconnect agreements in Asia and the Middle East through Etisalat by e& and Omantel.

== Transworld Home ==
Transworld Enterprise Services (TES) Pvt Ltd was incorporated in February 2011 as a wholly owned subsidiary of Transworld Associates.

The logo of Transworld Home

It was commercially launched in 2017 as Transworld Home, a residential triple play service provider offering Internet Services, Internet Protocol Television (IPTV) / digital TV (with the most number of HD Channels in Pakistan) and Telephone through its Fiber-to-the-home (FTTH) services in Karachi, Lahore and Islamabad. They offer plans ranging from 50 Mbit/s to 1 Gbit/s.

From Quarter 4 of 2022 to Quarter 4 of 2023 Transworld Home maintained its position of being Pakistan’s Fastest Internet Provider in Ookla Speed Test Global Index.

== Services ==
TWA offers numerous services as a Tier-1 provider, including IP Transit, MPLS and DDoS protection.
