= PECA Ordinance =

Pakistani act

Prevention of Electronic Crimes Act, 2016

National Assembly of Pakistan
- Long title: An Act to prevent cyber crimes in Pakistan
- Enacted by: National Assembly of Pakistan
- Assented to by: 11 August 2016
- Signed by: Mamnoon Hussain, then President of Pakistan

Related legislation
- Electronic Transaction Ordinance 2002, Pakistan Telecommunication (Re-Organization) Act 1996, Pakistan Telecommunication Authority Reorganization and Functionality Act 1996, Defamation Ordinance 2002

Summary
- The Prevention of Electronic Crimes Act, 2016 is an ordinance which states that the exemption for PEMRA licensed TV channels has been abolished in the Electronic Crimes Act 2016, after which fake information about any person on television. News or ridicule can also be considered an electronic crime.

Keywords
- Cybercrime, Electronic Transactions, Data Protection
- Status: In force

The PECA Ordinance is an ordinance which states that the exemption for PEMRA licensed TV channels has been abolished in the Electronic Crimes Act 2016, after which fake information about any person on television. News or ridicule can also be considered an electronic crime. in February 2025, it passed bill by senate.
