= Nayatel =

Internet service provider in Pakistan

NayaTel (Pvt.) Ltd.
- Type: Private
- Industry: IT & Telecommunications
- Founded: 2006; 20 years ago
- Founder: Wahaj-us-Siraj
- Headquarters: Islamabad, Pakistan
- Area served: Faisalabad; Gujranwala; Islamabad; Multan; Muzaffargarh; Peshawar; Rawalpindi; Sargodha; Sialkot; Taxila; Lahore; Attock; Gujrat; Rajanpur; Kot Addu; Wah; Deska
- Key people: Wahaj-us-Siraj (CEO); Saad Saleem (COO); Aqeel Khurshid (CTO)
- Products: Fiber Internet; Cable television; Digital television; HDTV; Landline telephone service; Website server & hosting service; Cloud computing; Over-the-top media service; Surveillance systems
- Number of employees: 2,000+ (2026)
- Website: www.nayatel.com

Nayatel (Urdu: نیاٹیل) is an Internet Service Provider (ISP) with its headquarters located in Islamabad, Pakistan. It was founded in 2006 and is currently led by CEO Wahaj-us-Siraj.

It provides telephone, fiber-based broadband internet and television services to residential and corporate customers in nine cities across Pakistan.

== History ==
Micronet Broaband (Pvt.) Limited (MBL) was Pakistan's first DSL operator, launched in July 2002 by co-founders Wahaj-us-Siraj, Aqeel Khurshid and Saad Saleem.

In 2006, Nayatel was created as a subsidiary of Micronet Broadband (Pvt.) Limited (MBL) as Pakistan's first Fiber-to-the-Home (FTTH) service provider.

Nayatel's services were exclusive to the twin cities of Islamabad and Rawalpindi, however, in 2016, they expanded to Faisalabad and in 2018, Peshawar was added to their coverage area.

== Products ==
=== Voice ===
Nayatel offers fixed-line telephone services as an option to all subscribers.

=== Internet ===
Fiber-to-the-home (FTTH) Internet is offered to residential consumers with plans ranging from 40 Mbit/s to 500 Mbit/s.

==== Network ====
In February 2020, Nayatel launched 10 Gbit/s XG-PON for corporate customers and simultaneously began offering Fiber-to-the-Tower (FTTT) to Telenor Pakistan.

Facebook partnered with Nayatel in 2021 to expand their fiber network across eight cities.

In 2023, Nayatel began rolling out IPv6 connectivity for both residential and corporate customers.

=== Television ===
Standard definition (SD) television channels are offered through basic cable and High-Definition (HD) television channels and a Video-on-Demand (VoD) platform are offered through a digital set-top-boxes branded 'Digital Box' and 'JoyBox'. Their latest addition Android TV Box is a Google certified TV box that converts regular TV to smart TV.

=== Surveillance systems ===
Nayatel started offering services of CCTV closed-circuit television digital surveillance to their clients by providing server based camera installation services with ethernet connectivity.

== Nayatel Cloud ==
In addition to being an ISP, Nayatel operates a cloud computing service known as 'Nayatel Cloud' to promote local hosting.

== Controversy ==
- Nayatel was one of the ISPs at odds with the Pakistan Telecommunication Authority (PTA) over the proposed changes to the DNS in Pakistan.
- Nayatel took the PTA to court over discrimination in Azad Kashmir.
- Competition Commission of Pakistan found in favour of Nayatel against Peshawar Electric Supply Company (Pesco) in a Right of Way case.
- Nayatel submitted a complaint against PTCL with the PTA alleging blockage of traffic.
- Nayatel took up a case against the Army Heritage Foundation over Right of Way (ROW) charges.
