= Dhiraagu =

Maldivian telecommunications company

Dhivehi Raajjeygé Gulhun PLC
- Trade name: Dhiraagu
- Native name: ދިރާގު
- Company type: Public company (Note: 41.8% owned by the Maldivian government, 52% owned by Batelco, 6.2% owned by other public shareholders)
- Industry: Telecommunications
- Founded: 16 May 1988; 38 years ago (incorporated); 1 October 1988; 37 years ago (commenced operations)
- Headquarters: Malé, Maldives
- Key people: Mr Ismail Rasheed (CEO)
- Products: Fixed telephony Mobile telephony Broadband
- Revenue: MVR 251.05 million (Q3 2019)
- Net income: MVR 203.053 million (Q3 2019)
- Number of employees: 430+ full time
- Website: dhiraagu.com.mv

Dhiraagu (Dhivehi: ދިރާގު) is a Maldivian telecommunications company, which was founded in 1988. The company was created as a joint venture of the Maldivian government and Cable & Wireless and had a monopoly on the entire industry in the country until 2005, and retained a monopoly on fixed telephony and the exclusive right to terminate incoming international traffic on any network until the end of 2008.

The name "Dhiraagu" is an acronym for Dhivehi Raajjeygé Gulhun (Dhivehi: ދިވެހިރާއްޖޭގެ ގުޅުން, lit. 'Connection of Maldives').

Dhiraagu maintains one of the world's longest microwave links over water. This 65 km link across the equator connects Fuvahmulah and Gaafu Dhaalu – and therefore Gaafu Alifu atoll.

== History ==
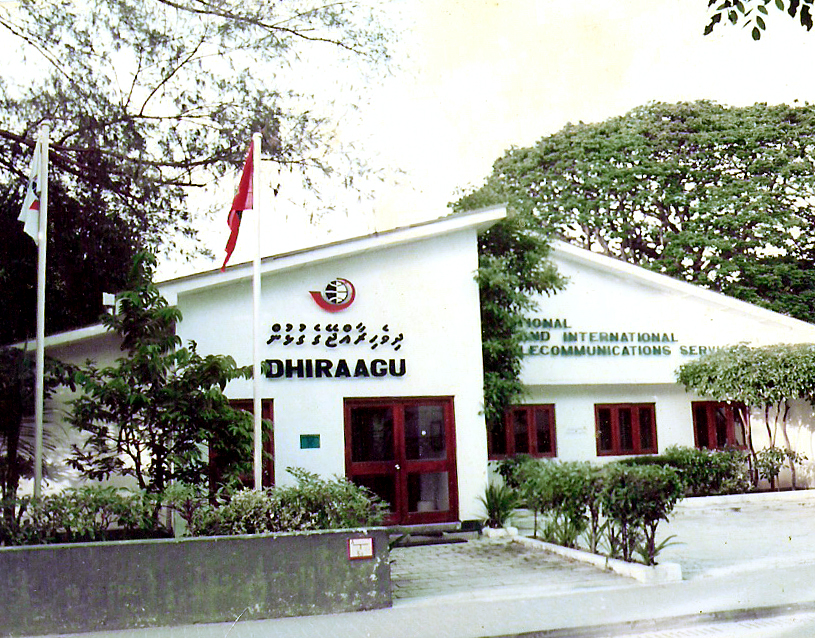
Dhiraagu front office, circa 1990. To left is the flag of Cable & Wireless Communications and to right is the flag of Maldives.

Though Dhiraagu is the first Maldivian telecommunications company, it's not the first to start the service. Telecommunication service in the Maldives was officially started on 23 December 1943, provided by the Maldivian government. On 17 May 1977 Cable & Wireless started its operations as the telecom provider. Later, in 1988, Cable and Wireless and the government of the Maldives formed a joint venture company, Dhiraagu (55% owned by the Government of Maldives and 45% by Cable and Wireless), making it the first ever Maldivian telecommunications company. Later it became a public company and currently the Maldivian government holds a 41.8% share in the company, while 52% is owned by Batelco and 6.2% is owned by the general public.

=== Significant events ===
Original logo. Replaced by the logo of the company's first rebrand on 23 June 2005.

- 1988 – Dhiraagu was officially established on 1 October 1988.
- 1989 – Major upgrade of copper network in the capital.
- 1991 – Paging service introduced.
- 1996 – Dial-up internet service was introduced to Maldives for the first time, under the brand name DhivehiNet.
- 1997 – Mobile phone service was introduced with Advanced Mobile Phone System Technologies.
- 1999 – Mobile phone service's platform changed to GSM.
- 2005 – On 23 June, Dhiraagu rebranded and introduced a new logo.
- 2006
  - Dhiraagu introduces ADSL services to Maldives.
  - On 25 February, Dhiraagu initiated/sponsored a successful world record attempt: the most people scuba diving simultaneously on a single site, with 979 people participating.
  - Dhiraagu connects a submarine cable with Sri Lanka.
  - Dhiraagu establishes domestic fibre optic submarine cable.
- 2010 – Dhiraagu introduces 3G HSPA services to Maldives.
- 2013 – Dhiraagu introduces 4G LTE services to Maldives.
- 2014 – Dhiraagu introduces VDSL services to Maldives under the brand name "UltraFast Broadband".
- 2015 – Dhiraagu introduces streaming TV services to Maldives under the brand name "DhiraaguTV ".
- 2015 – Dhiraagu Introduces FTTH services to Maldives under the brand name "Dhiraagu Fiber Broadband".
  - Dhiraagu commercially launched LTE Advanced for the first time in Maldives and the first in South Asia.
- 2017 – On 25 May, Dhiraagu rebranded and introduced a new logo and the slogan "Take On Tomorrow".

== Tier 2 network ==
On 18 September 2005 Dhiraagu signed an agreement with SLTMobitel for an Optical Submarine Cable System. Under the agreement, both companies will invest in maintaining the cable. The actual work of laying the 837 km cable was done by NEC of Japan, under a contract valued at US$22.7 million. On 14 November 2006 the cable was connected to a landing site at Hulhumale', Maldives. This Tier 2 network has an initial transmission capacity of 3 Giga bit per second (Gbit/s), which is capable of being increased to up to 160 Gbit/s. The system adopts wavelength-division multiplexing (WDM). This is the second submarine cable connecting Maldives to the world.

== Criticism ==
Dhiraagu held a monopoly on the telecoms market in the Maldives from its creation until 2005, a situation it is accused of having created and maintained. Until 2004, the Telecommunications Authority of Maldives had refrained from issuing additional licences to other companies, preventing any competition to all of the telecom services provided by Dhiraagu. This status quo may have been deliberately retained by the Maldivian government in an effort to profit from Dhiraagu's revenues, as it partly owns the company.

Dhiraagu was also heavily criticised for what the public describes as absurdly high prices during the 1980s and 1990s. Foreseeing competition and regular criticism from the public, the company lowered service prices in the mid- to late-2000s.

== See also ==
- Telecommunications in the Maldives
