= Digital divide in Pakistan =

The digital divide in Pakistan refers to inequalities between individuals, households, and other groups of different demographic and socioeconomic levels in Pakistan in access to information and communication technologies (ICTs) and in the knowledge and skills needed to effectively use the information gained from connecting. Recent research indicates that socioeconomic and constraint factors, such as income, household size, and literacy, significantly shape rural women’s access to and usability of ICTs in Pakistan’s agriculture sector.

== Internet access ==
Pakistan has one of the highest internet access rates among South Asian countries, with 88% of the population having some sort of access. Internet access in Pakistan began in the 1990s and has continued to grow over the past decades. Pakistan reported 61.34 million internet users in January 2021 relative to a population of 221 million (according to a 2020 World Bank report), an increase of 21% from the previous year. In addition, Pakistan counts around 15 million people who access the internet from mobile devices.

Pakistan has 5 broadband internet providers and 10 DSLs. Broadband use through computers is the most common way for Pakistanis to access the internet, with more than 100 million connecting this way. The second most popular way that people of Pakistan access the internet is through their cellular devices. Despite the relative high range of access, Pakistan has one of the slowest internet speeds. According to Ookla’s 2024 Speedtest Global Index, Pakistan ranked 100th out of 111 countries in mobile internet speeds, with a mean download speed of 7.85 Megabits per second (MBPS). Broadband download speeds ranked 141 of out 158m, with a median broadband download speed of 15.52 MBPS.

== Cell phone coverage ==
Currently, Pakistan has four major cell phone providers. They are (in order from most to fewest subscribers): Jazz 69.24 million; Telenor 48.94 million; Zong 40.12 million; and Ufone 23.48 million. Special Communications Organization (SCOM) operates mainly in the regions of Azad Kashmir and Gilgit-Baltistan, and has 1.42 million subscribers. This adds up to a total of 183.20 million subscribers across the country. According to the Pakistan Telecommunication Authority, the overall teledensity was 85% in 2021. In May 2017, the Pakistani government decided to lower tariffs and taxes on cellular services as well as on mobile phones. The reasons for this decision included years of pressure from the nation's top mobile operators and a World Bank report pointing out Pakistan's high taxing of telecom services in the region.

== Gender and caste ==
In rural Pakistan, cell service use is divided along gender lines. Dutch economist and researcher Karin Astrid Siegmann examined this disparity in a study, which found that 40% of female users have to ask permission from the male owners to make calls. Cell phones being in the hands of females is viewed unfavorably in Pakistani culture. According to one participant in the study, from the Muzzafargarh district in rural Pakistan, "women don't even know how to dial a number". Additionally, only 36% of woman own a cell phone, compared to 78% of men.

Besides gender, there is a distinct divide among castes. Newer castes rank much higher on the Digital Access Index (DAI) than the older castes. A 2015 study compared two political parties whose adherents are mostly dividing according to castes: the PTI (Pakistan Tehreek-e-Insaf), which is composed of newer castes (Khan, Hashmi, Alvi, and Qureshi), and; the Muslim League, which is composed of older castes. The PTI outperformed the Pakistan Muslim League in number of foreign visitors to its website, with a combined percentage of 12.7%, and in websites linking to it with 450, compared to the Muslim League's 168 (See Table 6 page 354). Ahsan Abdullah elaborates the important background of these findings: "Members of the new caste traditionally have not been farmers; for example, members of the Sheikh caste are traditionally traders, and members of the Syed caste traditionally hold religious offices, and hence they have to be better educated as compared to the old caste members. The old caste members, who are traditionally farmers, require tacit knowledge more than education to be successful. This observation is supported by the higher literacy rate in new castes as compared to the old caste members, with Pathan, Sheikh, and Syed being the top three educated castes among the 12 castes considered."

== Solutions ==
Besides private sector efforts, public-sector efforts put forth by the Pakistani government aim to help bridge the digital divide. An undertaking called the Universal Services Fund aimed to provide broadband internet coverage to the whole nation by 2018. In 2025, Pakistan's parliament approved legislation that established the Pakistan Digital Authority (PDA) to develop a national digital master plan to oversee widespread digital transformation that broadly impacts citizens across social groupings, including through raising digital literacy and promoting the digital economy. The PDA in particular has been tasked with reducing the digital divide, citing government figures that as of December 2025 only 40% of Pakistanis have stable, recurring internet access.
