= 3G adoption =

Mobile telecommunications phase

3G mobile telephony was relatively slow to be adopted globally. In some instances, 3G networks do not use the same radio frequencies as 2G so mobile operators must build entirely new networks and license entirely new frequencies, especially so to achieve high data transmission rates. Other delays were due to the expenses of upgrading transmission hardware, especially for UMTS, whose deployment required the replacement of most broadcast towers. Due to these issues and difficulties with deployment, many carriers delayed acquisition of these updated capabilities.

In December 2007, 190 3G networks were operating in 40 countries and 154 HSDPA networks were operating in 71 countries, according to the Global Mobile Suppliers Association (GSA). In Asia, Europe, Canada and the US, telecommunication companies use W-CDMA technology with the support of around 100 terminal designs to operate 3G mobile networks.

Roll-out of 3G networks was delayed in some countries by the enormous costs of additional spectrum licensing fees. (See Telecoms crash.) The license fees in some European countries were particularly high, bolstered by government auctions of a limited number of licenses and sealed bid auctions, and initial excitement over 3G's potential.

The 3G standard is perhaps well known because of a massive expansion of the mobile communications market post-2G and advances of the consumer mobile phone. An especially notable development during this time is the smartphone (for example, the iPhone, and the Android family), combining the abilities of a PDA with a mobile phone, leading to widespread demand for mobile internet connectivity. 3G has also introduced the term "mobile broadband" because its speed and capability make it a viable alternative for internet browsing, and USB Modems connecting to 3G networks are becoming increasingly common.

== Africa ==
The first African use of 3G technology was a 3G video call made in Johannesburg on the Vodacom network in November 2004. The first commercial launch was by Emtel-ltd in Mauritius in 2004. In late March 2006, a 3G service was provided by the new company Wana in Morocco. In May 2007, Safaricom launched 3G services in Kenya while later that year Vodacom Tanzania also started providing services. In February 2012 Bharti Airtel Launched a 3.75G Network in selected cities in Kenya with a countrywide rollout planned for later in the year. In Egypt, Mobinil launched the service in 2008 and in Somaliland, Telesom started first 3G services on 3 July 2011, to both prepaid and postpaid subscription customers. Telecommunication networks in Nigeria like Globacom, Etisalat, Airtel and MTN provide 3G services to their numerous customers.

== Asia ==
Asia is also using 3G services very well. A lot of companies like Dialog Axiata PLC Sri Lanka (First to serve 3G Service in South Asia in 2006), BSNL, WorldCall, PTCL, Mobilink, Zong, Ufone, Telenor PK, Maxis, Vodafone, Airtel, Idea Cellular, Aircel, Tata DoCoMo and Reliance have released their 3G services.

=== Sri Lanka ===
Sri Lanka's All Mobile Networks(Dialog, Mobitel, Etisalat, Hutch, Airtel,) And CDMA Network Providers (Lankabell, Dialog, Suntel, SLT) Launched 3G Services.

Dialog, Mobitel launched 4G LTE Services In Sri Lanka. Not Only (Dialog CDMA, Lankabell CDMA Have 4G LTE Services. Sri Lanka Telecom Have 4G LTE, FTTX Services..

=== Afghanistan ===
On March 19, 2012, Etisalat Afghanistan, the fastest growing telecommunications company in the country and part of Etisalat Group, announced the launch of 3G services in Afghanistan. between 2013 and 2014 all telecommunications company ( Afghan Wireless, Etisalat, Roshan, MTN and Salaam Network) provided 3G, 3.5G and 3.75G services and they are planning for 4G services in 2016–2017.

=== Nepal ===
Nepal was one of the first countries in southern Asia to launch 3G services. Nepal's first 3G company was NTC (Nepal Telecom Corporation) and the second was Ncell. Ncell also covered Mount Everest with 3G. NTC provides high speed video calling with other 3G services, as well as post-paid and pre-paid 3G SIM cards.

=== Pakistan ===
3G and 4G was simultaneously launched in Pakistan on April 23, 2014, through a SMRA Auction. Three out of five Companies got a 3G licence i.e. Ufone, Mobilink and Telenor while China Mobile's Zong got 3G as well as a 4G licence. Whereas the fifth company, Warid Pakistan did not participate in the auction procedure. However, they launched 4G LTE services on their existing 2G 1800 MHz spectrum due to Technology neutral terms and became world's first Telecom Company to transform directly from 2G to 4G. With that Pakistan joined the 3G and 4G world. In the non-mobile sector, Pakistan's biggest telecommunication company PTCL launched its 3G network, EVO, in mid-2008 and has since then established itself in this sector. It provides 3G services in 105 cities across Pakistan. Omantel's WorldCall also provides 3G services in 50 cities Pakistan-wide. They provide mobile broadband service via dongles and modems. On 14 August 2010, Pakistan became the first country in the world to experience EVDO's RevB 3G technology that offers maximum speeds of 9.3 Mbit/s. At present the services of EVO Nitro (brand name) are available in Islamabad, Rawalpindi, Lahore and Karachi. The RevA network, with speeds if up to 3.1 Mbit/s is available in over 100 cities of the country.

=== Bangladesh ===
State-run mobile operator Teletalk Bangladesh limited and other GSM operators GrameenPhone, Banglalink, Robi and Airtel already started hi-speed 3G+ and 3.5G services using UMTS with HSDPA facilities. Grameenphone has a plan to launch 4G LTE services first time in Bangladesh using TD-LTE technology. Currently Grameenphone owned 10 MHz spectrum at 3G auction by BTRC.Robi and Airtel recently merged, newly merged company has a plan to introduce 4G operation soon. Two other data operators, Qubee and Banglalion, currently offer 4G Wimax services in Bangladesh. CityCell now switched off their operation by government order. 4G LTE services have already begun in Bangladesh through all mobile operators except Teletalk, the state run mobile operator. Bangladesh has a plan to introduce super speed 5G service soon. A test run will be conducted in the country in mid July 2018.

=== China ===
China announced in May 2008, that the telecoms sector was re-organized and three 3G networks would be allocated so that the largest mobile operator, China Mobile, would retain its GSM customer base. China Unicom would retain its GSM customer base but relinquish its CDMA2000 customer base, and launch 3G on the globally leading W-CDMA (UMTS) standard. The CDMA2000 customers of China Unicom would go to China Telecom, which would then launch 3G on the CDMA2000 1x EV-DO standard. This meant that China would have all three main cellular technology 3G standards in commercial use. Finally in January 2009, Ministry of industry and Information Technology of China awarded licenses of all three standards: TD-SCDMA to China Mobile, W-CDMA to China Unicom and CDMA2000 to China Telecom. The launch of 3G occurred on 1 October 2009, to coincide with the 60th Anniversary of the Founding of the People's Republic of China. By August 2011, China Telecom's 3G subscriber has exceeded 23 million .

=== India ===
On 11 December 2008, India entered the 3G arena with the launch of 3G enabled Mobile and Data services by Government owned Mahanagar Telephone Nigam Ltd MTNL in Delhi and later in Mumbai. MTNL becomes the first 3G Mobile service provider in India. After MTNL, another state operator Bharat Sanchar Nigam Ltd. (BSNL) launched 3G services on 22 Feb 2009 in Chennai and Kolkata and later launched 3G as Nationwide. The auction of 3G wireless spectrum was announced in April 2010 and 3G Spectrum allocated to all private operators on 1 September 2010. While 3G was embraced by several countries at the beginning of the millennium, it was introduced to India somewhat later. The first network to make mobile internet browsing hassle-free was 3G. Even though it is sluggish those days, it is still sufficient for watching films and streaming music. However, telecommunications companies like Airtel have begun to shut down 3G networks in a number of Indian regions.

Maximum Speed: 384 kilobits/second

=== North Korea ===
North Korea has had a 3G network since 2008, which is called Koryolink, a joint venture between Egyptian company Orascom Telecom Holding and the state-owned Korea Post and Telecommunications Corporation (KPTC). It is North Korea's only 3G Mobile operator, and one of only two mobile companies in the country. According to Orascom quoted in BusinessWeek, the company had 125,661 subscribers in May 2010. The Egyptian company owns 75 percent of Koryolink, and is known to invest in infrastructure for mobile technology in developing nations. It covers Pyongyang, and five additional cities and eight highways and railways. Its only competitor, SunNet, uses GSM technology and suffers from poor call quality and disconnections. Phone numbers on the network are prefixed with +850 (0)192.

=== Philippines ===
3G services were made available in the Philippines in December 2008.

=== Singapore ===
3G services were made available in Singapore in October 2007. Widespread adoption of 3G began in January 2009, with the upgrading of phones to iPhone 3G and Android.

== Europe ==
In Europe, mass market commercial 3G services were introduced starting in March 2003 by O2 in the UK and Italy. The European Union Council suggested that the 3G operators should cover 80% of the European national populations by the end of 2005.

== Canada ==
In Canada, Bell Mobility, SaskTel and Telus launched a 3G EVDO network in 2005. Rogers Wireless was the first to implement UMTS technology, with HSDPA services in eastern Canada in late 2006. Realizing they would miss out on roaming revenue from the 2010 Winter Olympics, Bell and Telus formed a joint venture and rolled out a shared HSDPA network using Nokia Siemens technology. After the AWS spectrum in 2008, new entrants to the Canadian wireless markets including but not limited to Mobilicity, Wind Mobile and Vidéotron have deployed their own UMTS networks in Canada using the AWS spectrum.

== Middle East ==
In Iran Rightel won the bid for the third Operator license. Rightel is the first 3G operator in Iran. Rightel has commercially launched in the last months of 2011.

In Jordan, Orange is the first mobile 3G operator.

Mobitel Iraq is the first mobile 3G operator in Iraq. It was launched commercially in February 2007.

MTN Syria is the first mobile 3G operator in Syria. It was launched commercially in May 2010.

In Lebanon Ministry of Telecoms launched a test period on September 20, 2011, where 4,000 smart-phone users were selected to enjoy 3G for one month and provide feedback. Currently, the test period is over, MTC Touch and Alfa began rolling out the new 3G services.

Saudi Arabia has got 4G as well as 3G/HSPA With Zain KSA, Saudi Telecom, and Mobily KSA.

== Trinidad and Tobago ==
In Trinidad and Tobago, Digicel was the first to implement UMTS services with the introduction of HSPA+ in May 2012. bmobile launched their 3G UMTS network in November 2012 with the implementation of HSPA+.

== Turkey ==
Turkcell, Avea and Vodafone launched their 3G networks commercially on 30 July 2009 at the same time. Turkcell and Vodafone launched their 3G service on all provincial centres. Avea launched it on 16 provincial centres. It was after Turkey's monopoly mobile operator Turkcell accepted number portability, mobile operators attended frequency band auction and frequencies for 3G usage distributed around mobile operators. Turkcell got A band, Vodafone B and Avea C. Currently Turkcell and Vodafone have 3G networks on most of crowded cities and towns. Turkey has 3.9G networks now.

== New Zealand ==
In late 2005, Vodafone NZ launched their 3G network, followed by Spark NZ's XT network in 2008, and newcomer 2degrees using a combination of Vodafone's 3G towers and their own in 2009. 2degrees has since built more towers, and is now self-sufficient in the major cities (Auckland, Hamilton, Wellington, Christchurch and Dunedin) but relies on a roaming agreement with Vodafone to cover the rest of the country. This gives it essentially the same footprint as Vodafone.
