= 2014 Pakistani Telecom spectrum auction =

Pakistan's next generation mobile spectrum auction for the electromagnetic spectrum's licenses was held on 23 April 2014 by Pakistan Telecommunication Authority.

== 2014 Spectrum Auction ==
On 14 April 2014, four companies submitted their bids to PTA, includes Zong, Ufone, Telenor and Jazz for Next Generation Mobile Services. Jazz and Zong bid for 10 MHz while Telenor and Ufone bid for 5 MHz.

Pakistan's first spectrum auction to enhance mobile broadband services was held in 2014. Technology neutral spectrum in two frequency bands, namely the 2100 MHz band and 1800 MHz was auctioned by PTA. The Government earned $903 million from auction in the 2100 MHz band and $210 million from auction in the 1800 MHz band with total revenue of $1.12 billion from both auctions. Zong launched mobile services based on 4G technology in Pakistan from 1800 MHz band. Another license for 4G was not won by any participant. In the 2100 MHz band, 3G services were launched by Zong along with Jazz won 2x10 MHz license from 2100 MHz band. Ufone and Telenor won 2x5 MHz license for 3G from the same band.

Later 2X10 MHz spectrum was auctioned in the 850 MHz band in 2016 and 2X10 MHz in the 1800 MHz in 2017. The winners were Telenor and Jazz respectively and another US$690 Million were paid for the same. Taking the total to US$1.8 Billion earned through auction from 2014 to 2017. The broadband subscribers increased from 3.79 Million to around 64 Million as of February 2019.

=== Participants ===
Four companies participated in the auction were:

- Zong
- Ufone
- Telenor
- Jazz
