= Mobile phone industry in Pakistan =

The mobile phone network operator industry in Pakistan is a growing industry. According to figures from the Pakistan Telecommunication Authority (PTA), there were 152 million mobile 'phone subscribers' in Pakistan in March 2019.

The mobile industry in Pakistan has traditionally been marked by intense competition. However, as they step into the year 2023, there has been an unforeseen decline in the importation of mobile phones. This unexpected downturn in the mobile import market has triggered a sudden surge in mobile prices across Pakistan. Several factors contribute to this phenomenon, including the devaluation of the Pakistani rupee and an associated increase in taxes, which stands out as a prominent catalyst. Additionally, the current state of Pakistan's democracy, a lack of domestic production capacity, and the high costs associated with imports are further exacerbating this situation. Furthermore, rising inflation and the depreciation of the Pakistani currency have compelled major smartphone brands to raise their mobile device prices.

== Growth of mobile cellular phones services industry ==
PTA figures for 2007, for comparison, reported 48.5 million subscribers, rising to 102 million (over 60% of the population) by December 2010.

In 2007, the largest cellular mobile telephone service providing company in Pakistan was Mobilink, and other companies included Wateen (a member of Dhabi Group).

In 2010, there were five mobile cellular phone service operator companies in Pakistan.

== See also ==
- Paktel
- Zong Pakistan
- Mobile phone manufacturing industry in Pakistan.
