= Paktel =

Defunct Pakistani cellular operator

- دل تو ایک ہے; There's only one heart
- Native name: پاکٹل
- Company type: Telecommunication operator
- Industry: Telecommunications
- Genre: Subsidiary
- Founded: 1989
- Defunct: March 31, 2008
- Fate: Rebranded to Zong
- Successor: Zong
- Headquarters: 68-E Jinnah Avenue, Blue Area, Islamabad, Pakistan
- Products: Mobile telephony
- Website: https://paktel.com

Paktel (Urdu: پاکٹل) was a cellular network operator in Pakistan. It was granted a license to carry out cellular phone services in Pakistan and set up by Cable & Wireless. It carried out AMPS services until 2004 when the company switched to GSM technology.

Paktel offered only mobile telephony service to its 2 million subscriber base. As of 2007, Paktel was ranked the fifth mobile player of Pakistani market owing to low subscriber base and market share. After the completion of its acquisition by China Mobile, Paktel was rebranded as Zong Pakistan on April 1, 2008.

== History ==
Cable & Wireless and its local partner Hasan Associates (a major local team was consisting on Farooq Hasan, R A Zuberi, Shahid Mahmud, Syed Ahmed Ali, and Qazi Abdul Wahid & Dewan) launched the commercial service Paktel in 1990. Paktel was granted a license in early 1990 to operate a cellular telephone network throughout Pakistan. It was the first company granted a free license to carry out cellular phone services in Pakistan. It carried out AMPS services until 2004.

The Paktel Mediation and Billing System was developed by Syed Ahmed Ali, Nadeem Usmani, Wasay Farooqi, and Ali Korani. It was first mediation software in the region that had been developed locally, and also the first cellular billing system for the region. Millicom-owned Instaphone merged as its competitor in the late 1990s and began to dominate the market. With the launch of Mobilink and its rapid success in 1998, both Instaphone and Paktel floundered and lost their dominant market share. It was followed by the acquisition of Cable & Wireless owned Paktel by Millicom, the majority owners of Instaphone.

In November 2000, Millicom acquired a 98.9% equity interest in Paktel. Millicom installed a new management team headed by John Tumelty, former CEO of Instaphone, and Chief financial officer David Ordman.

In April 2001, Paktel launched prepaid services under the brand Tango. The manager of this brand was Amees Ahmad.

In October 2002, Paktel was granted a modification to its license, allowing it to operate a GSM based network and the Frequency Allocation Board of Pakistan thereby awarded the necessary frequencies. Paktel was awarded additional 1800 MHz spectrum, increasing total spectrum for GSM network from 10 MHz to 13.6 MHz. After obtaining frequencies Paktel launched GSM network in October 2004.

On October 23, 2004, Paktel agreed with Pakistan Telecommunication Authority to launch GSM network with immediate effect and renew their license for 15 years from October 23, 2004 for a license fee of $291,000,000. This agreement was signed by the two parties on October 25, 2004. Paktel and the PTA agreed delayed payment terms under which 50% of the license fee will be paid in installments over the first three years of the license. The second 50% of the license fee will be payable in ten yearly payments from 2008 to 2017.

On March 31, 2005, Paktel held approximately 340,000 GSM subscribers and its network comprised 300 cell sites, covering about 45% of the population. By November 2005, Paktel had 1 million customer base and a market share of 9%, with subscriber count increasing at a rate of 100,000 per month.

In November 2006, Millicom announced that it had decided to exit the Pakistani market. Pakistani authorities had refused to delay payment of a $29 million licence installment and had not given Paktel permanent access to part of the frequency spectrum. Announcing its pullout, Millicom said it decided against making significant investments in Pakistan because of tough market conditions. It had already sold Instaphone to a local telecom company Arfeen Group in October 2005 and was looking for potential buyers for Paktel.

Initially Kuwait based the then MTC showed an interest for buy-out. But it was the China Mobile who won the bid.

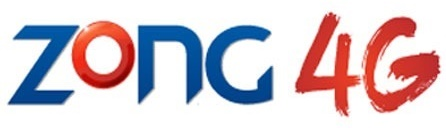
Paktel was rebranded to Zong

On January 22, 2007, Millicom International Cellular S.A. stated that it would sell its 88.86 percent stake in Paktel to China Mobile for $284 million, which includes the repayment of intercompany debt. The sale implies an enterprise value for Paktel of $460 million, Millicom said in its press release. Merrill Lynch advised China Mobile on the transaction.

On 4 May 2007, Paktel Limited was renamed to China Mobile Pakistan. On May 16, 2007 China Mobile announced that it had increased its stake in CMPak to 100%.

China Mobile Pakistan continued to operator under Paktel brand until March 31, 2007. After acquisition, China Mobile Pakistan invested more than US$700 million in the telecom sector in Pakistan and US$800 million were further invested by the end of year 2008.

Pakistan Telecommunication Authority said that it might resolve the frequency issue with China Mobile, as it was one of the main reason for pullout by Millicom International Cellular S.A. According to the statistics from the Pakistan Telecommunication Authority, Paktel had 2.145 million customers at the end of February 2008.

On April 1, 2008, Paktel was rebranded to Zong. China Mobile Pakistan organised a launch event on April 5.

== Network ==
Paktel's entire network that included network base stations, GSM core, SMS, microwave links, IT support, and transmission towers was based on GSM network infrastructure from ZTE. ZTE also provided Paktel consumers with missed call and welcome messages features at that time.

=== Radio frequency ===
Frequencies used by Paktel
Frequency	Protocol	Class
900 MHz	GSM	2G
1800 MHz	GSM	2G

=== Number scheming ===
Paktel used the following numbering schemes:

Technology	Scheme
APMS later switched to GSM	+92 303 N_{1}N_{2}N_{3}N_{4}N_{5}N_{6}N_{7}
GSM only	+92 304 N_{1}N_{2}N_{3}N_{4}N_{5}N_{6}N_{7}

Where, 92 is the ISD code for Pakistan and is required when dialling outside the country, 303 and 304 were prefixes for Paktel once AMPS and GSM customers respectively allocated by Pakistan Telecommunication Authority. Omitting +92 would require 0 instead to represent local call, hence 0303 and 0304 were the general prefixes and N_{1}N_{2}N_{3}N_{4}N_{5}N_{6}N_{7} was the subscriber number. After being rebranded as Zong, the code was changed to 031x whereas 0303 and 0304 were taken over by Mobilink.

== Marketing ==
Paktel identity: Because there's only one heart – Dil to aik hai

Paktel offered prepaid and postpaid plans. It was initially offering only postpaid services with Rs. 5000/- as initial security deposit. The call data was used to be stored on magnetic tapes, sent to the United Kingdom for printing and bills were then dispatched to the customers after a delay of 45 days. This ensued in non-payments from many defaulters who fled after receiving large bills. The call rate was charged to both the caller and the receiver alike. In April 2001, the prepaid brand Tango was launched under the management of Amees Ahmad.

Paktel had customer service centres in major cities and country-wide network of franchises further backed by retail channels.

Paktel was the first company to waive off national roaming and incoming calls charges to compete with the rival Mobilink and Ufone. Later it uncovered another offer, the country's first offer of its kind – free credit on receiving incoming calls per minute basis. It came up with the slogan Call Suno Balance Barhao; Baqi Sab Bhool Jao (lit. Listen to the call increase your credit; forget the rest – Urdu: کال سنو بیلنس بڑھاؤ، باقی سب بھول جاؤ)^{RED Communication Arts. Paktel – Call Suno Balance Barhao. Karachi: Paktel.}

== See also ==
- Zong
- List of mobile network operators in Pakistan
