= Instaphone =

InstaPhone
- Company type: Private
- Industry: Telecommunication
- Genre: Subsidiary
- Founded: 1991
- Defunct: January 4, 2008 (License cancelled)
- Fate: License canceled
- Headquarters: Islamabad, Pakistan
- Key people: Iain Williams, CEO
- Products: InstaXcite, InstaPhone Postpaid
- Parent: Millicom International Cellular (former), Afreen Group (present)
- Website: https://www.instaphone.com

Instaphone was Pakistan's first mobile communication service. It was launched by M/s Pakcom Ltd., a telecommunications company and the industry pioneer in the country. The company was jointly owned by M/s Arfeen and Millicom International (Luxembourg) and was acquired in its entirety by the Arfeen Group later.

== History ==
In 1989, the Government of Pakistan awarded licences to mobile operators. M/s Pakcom Ltd. and M/s Paktel Ltd. won the bids and were granted 15-year licences. A third company (M/s Pakistan Mobile Telecommunication Ltd) was among the competitors, but did not meet the bid requirements.

The two companies raced to launch their cellular service and "Instaphone" won the race by a few weeks, when it launched its service on 16 October 1990 with 3 Radio Base Stations. Services were offered in Islamabad the following month. The cellular mobile exchange of both operators used Ericsson model AXE-10. Services at Peshawar were started in April 1991 as a satellite of the Islamabad exchange, linked via PTCL network. Quetta service began as a satellite of the Karachi exchange (linked via PTCL).

Billing was post-paid with Rs.5000/- as an initial deposit. Call data was stored on magnetic tapes that were sent to UK for printing of bills and the bills were then sent to customers, a 45+-day process. This delay led many to default after running up large bills. The call rate was Rs.4/- per minute for local calls charged to both (caller and responder). Such unpaid billing was Rs. 25 Million approx in June 1993.

The company's license was cancelled by the Pakistan Telecommunication Authority in January 2008 for unpaid license renewal fees totalling $291 million. Instaphone appealed the decision and filed a petition challenging the national Mobile Cellular Policy of 2004. Both actions were dismissed by the Islamabad High Court on April 14, 2009. The court extended the deadline for payment of the outstanding license fees to 6 May 2009.

Instaphone eventually declared bankruptcy.

== Market share ==
Before the company's license was canceled, It was ranked at the bottom in terms of market share.

Revenue, millions PKR.
2003-04	2004-05	2005-06	2006-07
3,196	2,693	1,539	472

== Technology migration strategy ==
Instaphone had a unique migration strategy between analog service in the 1980s to the digital GSM network. Due to a lack of telephone number porting laws in Pakistan, Instaphone kept a large TDMA network from the 1990s up until the middle of the 2000s. Due to this rare TDMA presence, Pakistan was flooded with unlocked American and Canadian TDMA cellphones for Instaphone customers who were mostly business users at the time and needed to keep their established telephone numbers.

== TDMA grey market phones ==
Many North American standard TDMA phones showed up in Dubai en route to Pakistan, usually bonded by third parties who kept satellite offices there. The majority of these North American phones were sold on the grey market allegedly laundering money for the Indian mafia. Hundreds of Pakistani immigrants across North America tried to take part in this opportunity and many lost their life savings over fraudulent letters of credit. The average shipment was approximately $30,000 USD of cellphones.

== See also ==
- List of mobile phone companies in Pakistan
- Communications in Pakistan
