= PKNIC =

Domain name registry administrator of Pakistan

- Founded: 1992; 34 years ago
- Website: www.pknic.net.pk

PKNIC is the .pk domain name registry in Pakistan. PKNIC is responsible for the administration of the .PK domain name space, including the operation of the DNS for the Root-Servers for .PK domains, and registration and maintenance of all .PK domain names. PKNIC is operated as a self-supporting organization. It is headquartered in Lahore.

Up until July 2009, there were no .PK root servers inside Pakistan, numerous attempts were made in the past to bring .pk operations to Pakistan. A Pakistani newspaper, DAWN, reported in 2009 that the Government, working through the PTA, managed to convince the owner of PKNIC to open an office in Lahore and deploy a mirrored root server (m-2.pknic.net.pk) in what once used to be his hometown.
