= Telephone numbers in Pakistan =

- Land controlled by Pakistan shown in dark green, land claimed but not controlled shown in light green
- Country: Pakistan
- Continent: Asia
- Regulator: Pakistan Telecommunication Authority
- Numbering plan type: Closed
- Numbering plan: National Numbering Plan Pakistan
- Last updated: 23 July 2010
- Country code: +92
- International access: 00
- Long-distance: 0

Telephone numbers in Pakistan are ten digits long. Landline numbers and mobile numbers have different structures. Geographically fixed landline are prefixed by an area code which varies in length depending on the significance of the place. Mobile numbers are prefixed followed by a two-digit code indicating the telephone operator. The international country code for Pakistan is +92.

== Fixed (landline) numbers ==
Area codes in Pakistan are from two to five digits long; the smaller the city, the longer the prefix. All the large cities have two-digit codes.

Smaller towns have a six digit number. Azad Jammu and Kashmir has six digit numbers as well. Large cities have seven digit numbers. On 1 July 2009, telephone numbers in Karachi and Lahore were changed from seven digits to eight digits. This was accomplished by adding the digit 9 to the beginning of any phone number that started with a 9 (government and semi-government connexions), and adding the digit 3 to any phone numbers that did not start with the number 9.

It is common to write phone numbers as (0xx) yyyyyyy, where xx is the area code. The 0 prefix is for trunk (long-distance) dialling from within the country. International callers should dial +92xxyyyyyyy

All mobile phone codes are four digits long and start with 03. All mobile numbers are seven digits long, and denote the mobile provider on a nationwide basis and not geographic location. Thus all Telenor numbers (for example) nationwide carry mobile code 0345 etc.

NWD (area) codes for common cities are:

- 021 xxxxxxxx: Karachi
- 022 xxxxxxx: Hyderabad
- 040 xxxxxxx: Sahiwal
- 041 xxxxxxxx: Faisalabad
- 042 xxxxxxxx: Lahore
- 044 xxxxxxx: Okara
- 046 xxxxxxxx: Toba Tek Singh
- 048 xxxxxxx: Sargodha
- 049 xxxxxxx: Kasur
- 051 xxxxxxxx: Islamabad and Rawalpindi
- 052 xxxxxxx: Sialkot
- 053 xxxxxxx: Gujrat
- 055 xxxxxxx: Gujranwala
- 056 xxxxxxxx:Sheikhupura
- 057 xxxxxxx: Attock
- 061 xxxxxxx: Multan
- 062 xxxxxxx: Bahawalpur
- 064 xxxxxxx: Dera Ghazi Khan
- 068 xxxxxxx: Rahim Yar Khan
- 071 xxxxxxx: Sukkur
- 081 xxxxxxx: Quetta
- 086 xxxxxxx: Gwadar
- 091 xxxxxxx: Peshawar
- 0457 xxxxxx: Arifwala
- 0544 xxxxxx: Jhelum
- 0546 xxxxxx: Mandi Bahauddin
- 0606 xxxxxx: Layyah
- 0852 xxxxxx: Turbat & Kech District
- 0853 xxxxxx:Lasbela District
- 0855 xxxxxx:Panjgur
- 0926 xxxxxx: Parachinar FATA
- 0938 xxxxxx: Swabi
- 0966 xxxxxxx: Dera Ismail Khan
- 0992 xxxxxx: Abbottabad
- 0997 xxxxxx: Mansehra

Premium Rate services:
*0900 xxxxx

Toll free numbers (for landline callers within Pakistan):
*0800 xxxxx

== Mobile telephone numbers ==
Mobile telephone numbers in Pakistan are of the following format: 03XZ-YYYYYYY where X is the single letter code assigned to a specific mobile telephone operator and Z-YYYYYYY is the local telephone number from any mobile phone or landline.

- 3 - is the Mobile Access code
- Z can be any value between 0 and 9, assigned by the operator itself, except in case of SCOM where Z=5 only
- X=0 Jazz
- X=1 Zong
- X=2 Jazz
- X=3 Ufone
- X=4 Ufone
- X=5 SCO (Z = 5 only)
- X=7 Zong (Z = 0 and 1 only)

Existing Codes

- 300, 301, 302, 303, 304, 305, 306, 307, 308, 309 - Jazz
- 310, 311, 312, 313, 314, 315, 316, 317, 318, 319 - Zong
- 320, 321, 322, 323, 324, 325, 326, 327, 328, 329 - Jazz
- 330, 331, 332, 333, 334, 335, 336, 337, 338, 339 - Ufone
- 340, 341, 342, 343, 344, 345, 346, 347, 348, 349 - Ufone
- 370, 371 - Zong
