= PMCL =

PMCL may refer to

- Penetang-Midland Coach Lines
- Pakistan Mobile Communication Limited
