= WorldCall =

Pakistani telecommunication and multimedia service provider

WorldCall Telecom
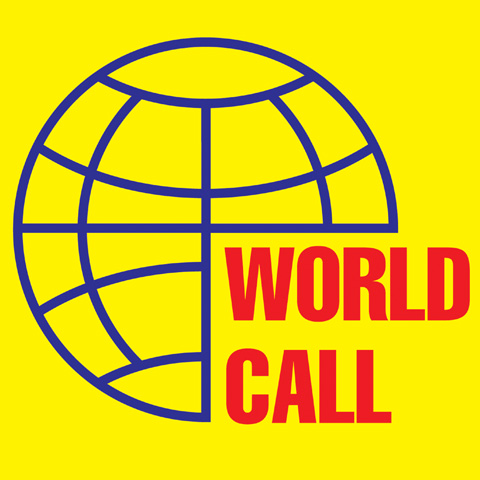
- Company type: Public
- Traded as: PSX: WTL
- Industry: Telecommunications
- Founded: 1996; 30 years ago
- Founder: Salman Taseer
- Headquarters: Lahore, Pakistan
- Key people: Mehdi Mohamed Jawad Abdullah Al Abduwani (Chairman); Abbas Raza (CEO)
- Revenue: ▲ Rs. 5.046 billion (US$18 million) (2024)
- Operating income: ▲ Rs. -1.29 billion (US$−4.6 million) (2024)
- Net income: ▲ Rs. -1.35 billion (US$−4.8 million) (2024)
- Total assets: ▲ Rs. 14.92 billion (US$53 million) (2024)
- Number of employees: 251 (2024)
- Website: www.worldcall.com.pk

WorldCall Telecom Limited is a Pakistani telecommunication and multimedia service provider based in Lahore, Pakistan. It is listed on the Pakistan Stock Exchange.

== History ==
WorldCall's history dates back to 1955 when First Capital Securities Corporation was established by Taseer family. The company began developing what would later become WorldCall Communications Limited, initially known as WorldCall Payphones.

It restarted its operations in 2001 as WorldCall Telecommunication Company Limited and initially offered bundled broadband internet and cable television services, which was a new concept in Pakistan at the time. The company received licenses from the Pakistan Telecommunication Authority for long distance international (LDI) and wireless local loop (WLL) services in July and November 2004, respectively. Following the deregulation of the telecommunications sector in Pakistan, WorldCall was the first company to deploy its LDI network and launch its services in November 2004.

In July 2005, WorldCall Broadband Limited and WorldCall Communications Limited were merged into WorldCall Telecom Limited, resulting in a single consolidated operating entity. A month later, in August 2005, WorldCall was listed on the Karachi Stock Exchange following an initial public offering at a strike price of PKR 10.

Initially, WorldCall's main services were wireless local loop (WLL) phones and long-distance calling. While this segment generated revenue, it faced competition from the increasing number of cellphone operators and decreasing prices of cellular services. By 2006, the benefits of WLL technology were reduced due to these market changes.

In 2008, Omantel acquired 56.8 percent shares of WorldCall for $193 million.

WorldCall's revenue peaked at Rs8.4 billion (approximately $100 million) in 2009. However, the company's market position was affected by the increasing cellular penetration, which exceeded 50 percent of the population, and the entry of the state-owned PTCL into the market with similar services. Its decline was further affected by a lack of investment in infrastructure by its management and majority shareholder. Financial issues, such as reliance on bond issuances and long-term bank loans, led WorldCall to face potential default.

In 2018, Omantel sold its entire shareholding.

== Operations ==
Worldcall provides broadband, cable television and telephone connectivity in Pakistan. In March 2021, WorldCall rolled out Fiber-to-the-home (FTTH) internet branded 'Fiber 5G+' in Lahore with plans ranging from 20 Mbit/s to 100 Mbit/s.

=== Dark Fiber ===
Worldcall operates over 7000 km of fiber network in Pakistan. It leases its fiber on an IRU basis.

=== Metro Ethernet Solutions ===
Metropolitan Ethernet (Metro Ethernet) is about using carrier Ethernet technology in metropolitan networks. Worldcall connects enterprises, academic institutions, and government institutes in all major cities of Pakistan. Worldcall has deployed Metro Ethernet networks which offer up to 10 G interface to customers.
