= PTCL =

Pakistani telecommunication company

Pakistan Telecommunication Company Limited (PTCL)

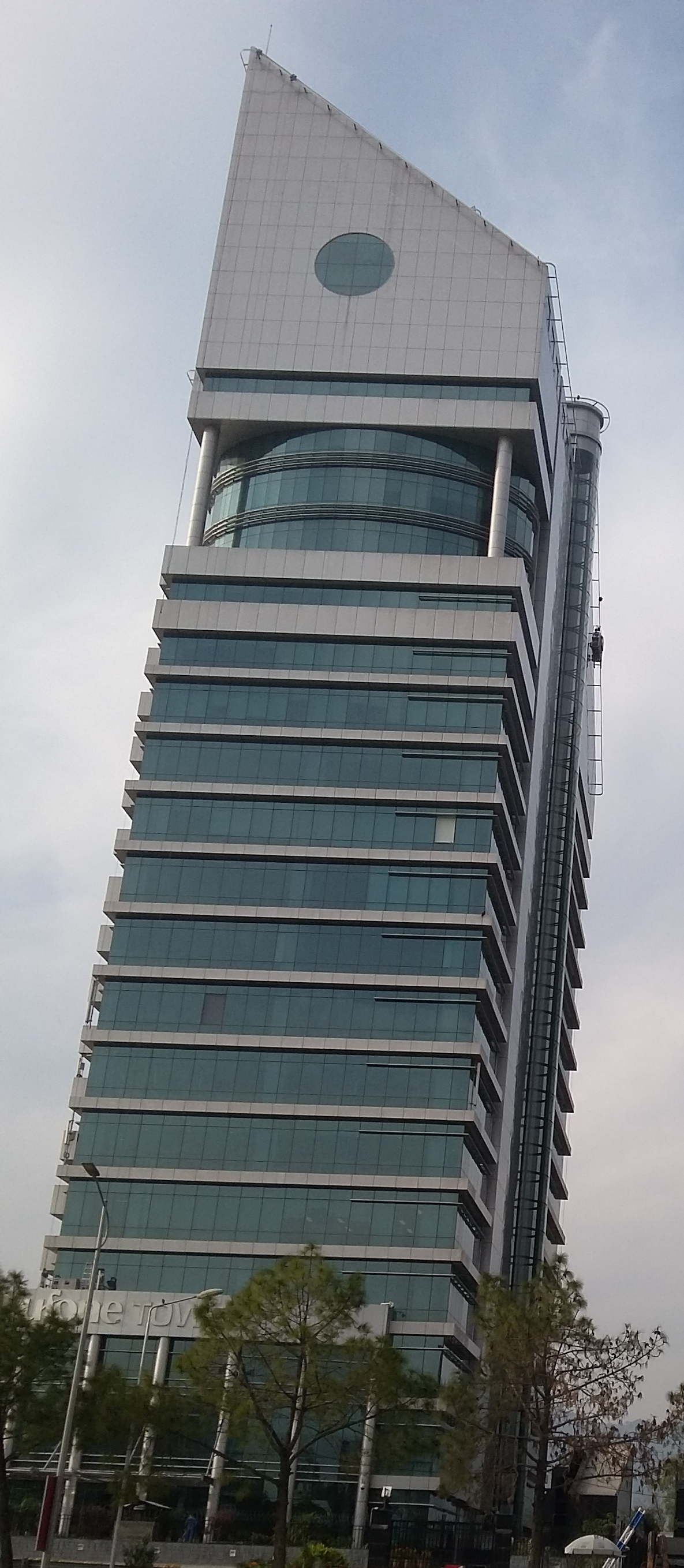
- Headquarters of PTCL in Islamabad
- Native name: شرکت مواصلات پاکستان محدود
- Type: Public
- Traded as: PSX: PTC; KSE 100 component
- Industry: Telecommunications
- Founded: 1995; 31 years ago
- Headquarters: Islamabad, Pakistan
- Number of locations: Islamabad
- Key people: Nadeem Khan (CEO)
- Products: Fiber-optic; Broadband; Broadcasting; Cable television; Digital telephone; HDTV; Internet; Pay television; Mobile; VoIP phone
- Revenue: ▲ Rs. 120.113 billion (US$430 million) (2025)
- Operating income: ▼ Rs. 6.202 billion (US$22 million) (2025)
- Net income: ▼ Rs. 1.382 billion (US$4.9 million) (2025)
- Total assets: ▲ Rs. 647.144 billion (US$2.3 billion) (2025)
- Total equity: ▼ Rs. 127.096 billion (US$450 million) (2025)
- Owner: Govt of Pakistan (62%); Etisalat (26%)
- Number of employees: 13,859 (2025)
- Subsidiaries: Ufone; UPaisa; Telenor Pakistan
- Website: ptcl.com.pk
- Footnotes; Financials as of 31 December 2025

Pakistan Telecommunication Company Ltd., commonly known as PTCL, is the national telecommunication company in Pakistan. PTCL provides telephone and internet services nationwide and is the backbone for the country's telecommunication infrastructure. The corporation manages and operates around 2000 telephone exchanges across the country, providing the largest fixed-line network. Data and backbone services such as GSM, HSPA+, CDMA, LTE, broadband internet, IPTV, and wholesale are an increasing part of its business.

Originally a state-owned corporation, the shareholding of PTCL was reduced to 62%, when 26% of shares and control were sold to Etisalat Telecommunications while the remaining 12% to the general public in 2006 under an intensified privatization program under Prime Minister Shaukat Aziz. However, the 62% of shares still remain under the management of government-ownership of state-owned corporations of Pakistan.

== Leadership ==
Following the acquisition of Telenor Pakistan and the separation of Ufone as a brand, PTCL will operate with its own board and Chief Executive. On 14 July 2026, PTCL confirmed the appointment of Nadeem Khan as its new CEO.

== History ==
=== Posts & Telegraph Department ===
It was known as the Posts & Telegraph Department in 1949 and as Pakistan Telephone & Telegraph Department in 1962.

=== Pakistan Telecommunication Corporation ===
Pakistan Telecommunication Corporation (PTC) took over operations and functions from Pakistan Telephone and Telegraph Department under Pakistan Telecommunication Corporation Act 1991. This coincided with the Government's competitive policy, encouraging private sector participation and resulting in the award of licenses for cellular, card-operated pay-phones, paging and, lately, data communication services.

=== Privatization Plan ===
Pursuing a progressive policy, the Government in 1991, announced its plans to privatize PTCL, and in 1994 issued six million vouchers exchangeable into 600 million shares of the would-be PTCL in two separate placements. Each had a par value of Rs. 10 per share. These vouchers were converted into PTCL shares in mid-1996.

=== Pakistan Telecommunication Company Limited ===
On 31 December 1995, the Pakistan Telecommunication (Reorganization) Act, 1996, was passed, which formally reconstituted the Pakistan Telecommunication Corporation as PTCL. The act facilitated the transfer of the telecommunications business, along with its associated assets, rights, liabilities, and obligations, from the corporation to PTCL. However, certain exclusions were allocated to the National Telecommunication Corporation (NTC), Frequency Allocation Board (FAB), Pakistan Telecommunication Authority (PTA), and Pakistan Telecommunication Employees Trust (PTET).

As part of the reorganization process, the Government of Pakistan divested 26 percent of its PTCL shares through an initial public offering (IPO) at a strike price of PKR 30 and was subsequently listed on the Karachi Stock Exchange (KSE) in 1996.

PTCL launched its mobile and data services subsidiaries in 2001 by the name of Ufone and PakNet respectively. None of the brands made it to the top slots in the respective competitions. Lately, however, Ufone had increased its market share in the cellular sector. The PakNet brand has effectively dissolved over a period of time. Recent DSL services launched by PTCL reflects this by the introduction of a new brand name and operation of the service being directly supervised by PTCL.

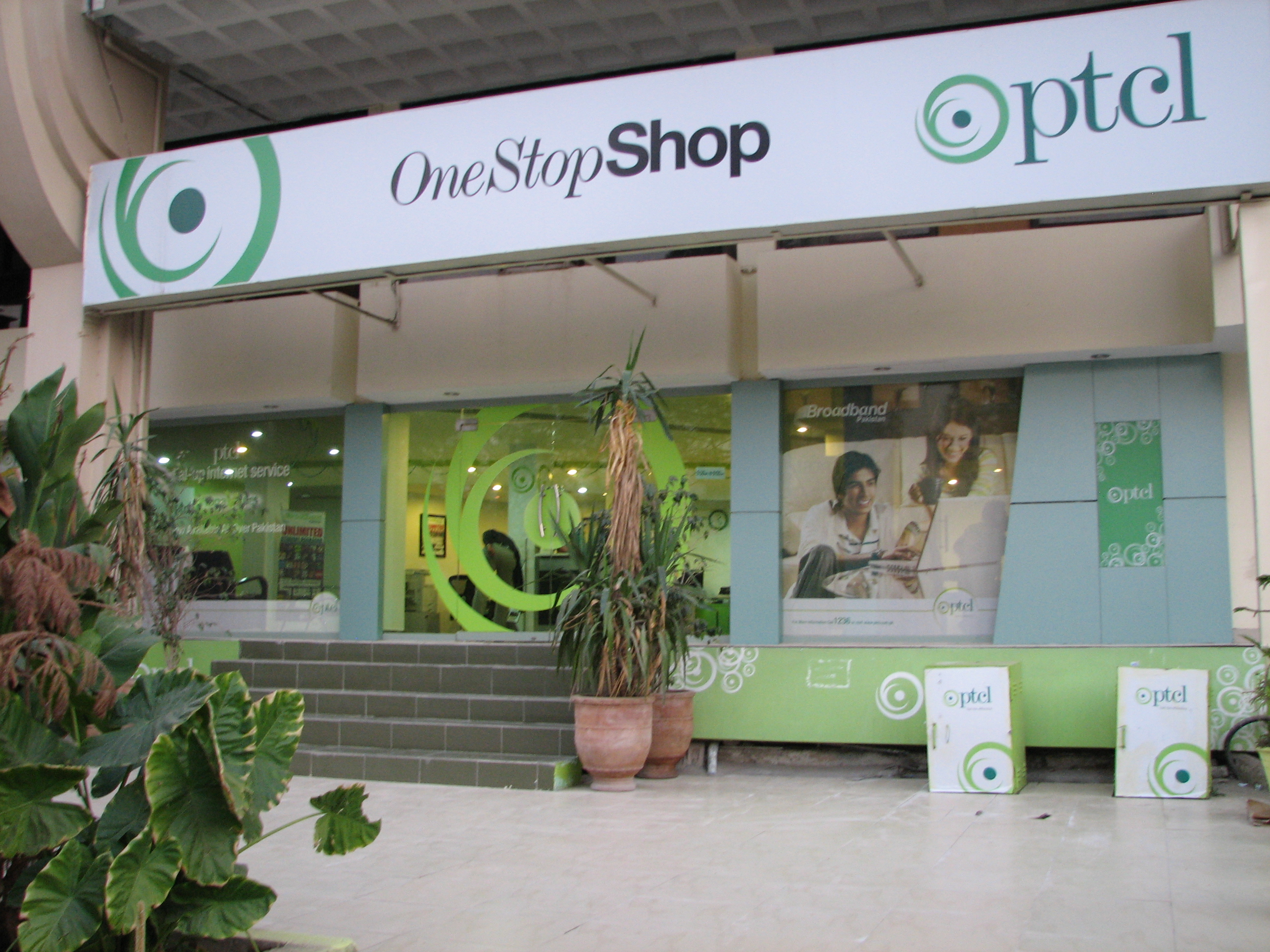
A shop of Pakistan Telecommunication Company Ltd (PTCL) in Islamabad

As telecommunication monopolies head towards an imminent end, services and infrastructure providers are set to face even bigger challenges. The post-monopoly era came with Pakistan's Liberalization in Telecommunication in January 2003. On the Government level, a comprehensive liberalization policy for the telecoms sector is in the offering.

In 2005, Government of Pakistan decided to sell 26 percent of the company to some private corporation. There were three participants in the bidding process for the privatization of PTCL. Etisalat, an Abu Dhabi company was able to get the shares with a large margin in the bid. In June 2005, Etisalat won the 26% of PTCL shares along with management control of the then telecom monopoly for US$2.6 billion. As of 2019, Etisalat has held back $800m amount over a property-transfer dispute with the Pakistani government.

The government's plan of privatizing the corporation was not welcomed in all circles; countrywide protests and strikes were held by PTCL workers. They disrupted phone lines of institutions like Punjab University Lahore along with other public sector institutions.

== Financial and Operational performance ==
Year ended	Revenue (PKR million)	Operating income (PKR million)	Net income (PKR million)	Total assets (PKR million)	Total equity (PKR million)
31 December 2014	▲81,513	▼8,012	▼5,207	▼179,574	▼92,144
31 December 2015	▼75,752	▲13,272	▲8,760	▲180,378	▼86,218
31 December 2016	▼71,420	▼10,201	▼6,835	▼180,109	▼83,013
31 December 2017	▼69,757	▲12,845	▲8,350	▲186,158	▲84,952
31 December 2018	▲70,100	▼10,757	▼7,422	▲196,044	▼83,571
31 December 2019	▲71,548	▼9,331	▼6,347	▲209,994	▲87,751
31 December 2020	▲71,804	▼8,493	▼6,030	▲223,600	▲94,010
31 December 2021	▲76,853	▲9,682	▲6,874	▲245,735	▲99,653
31 December 2022	▲83,444	▲13,513	▲9,053	▲305,160	▲108,054
31 December 2023	▲96,267	▲13,906	▲9,391	▲387,602	▲117,368
31 December 2024	▲107,766	▼6,885	▼4,826	▲457,686	▼115,108
31 December 2025	▲120,113	▼6,202	▼1,382	▲647,144	▲127,096

== Products ==
=== Voice ===
PTCL provides fixed-line telephone services across Pakistan.

==== Vfone network shutdown ====
Wireless voice services used to be provided through PTCL's CDMA2000 network, which was broadcast over the 1900 MHz WLL frequency under the 'Vfone' brand name, however, the network was shut down on 31 August 2016 nationwide to allow the spectrum to be re-farmed for PTCL's 'CharJi' LTE service.

=== Internet ===
PTCL offers three different types of fixed-line broadband across 2,000 cities* in Pakistan with plans ranging from 2 Mbit/s to 250 Mbit/s.

- ADSL2+ (with optional G.992.5 Annex M) - plans from 2 Mbit/s to 20 Mbit/s
- VDSL2 - plans from 2 Mbit/s to 100 Mbit/s
- Fiber-to-the-Home (FTTH) - branded by PTCL as FlashFiber - plans from 20 Mbit/s to 250 Mbit/s

*PTCL's FlashFiber is not available nationwide, availability is currently limited to 95 cities.

==== Wireless ====
PTCL also offers TDD-LTE based Wireless Broadband under the 'CharJi' brand name with coverage in over 70 cities. Service is only available through their provided mobile hotspot device.

PTCL announced the termination of CharJi services across several cities in Pakistan effective 30 June 2024. Existing customers are being given an option to migrate to Ufone.

Ufone is a wholly owned subsidiary of PTCL, it also the fourth and the smallest cellular provider in mainland Pakistan. It provides GSM and LTE services over the 900, 1800 and 2100 MHz bands.

=== Television ===
In addition to voice and data services, PTCL also offers digital TV services based on DVB-IPTV under PTCL Smart TV brand name. PTCL users can also stream live TV using the Smart TV smartphone application.

== Anti-competitive practices ==
PTCL has faced allegations and rulings related to anti-competitive practices over the years, especially in the Islamabad-Rawalpindi region and in its broader telecom operations.

In 2006, PTCL cut Nayatel's E1 link at a colocation site despite Nayatel fulfilling its interconnect agreement obligations.

In November 2010, LINKdotNET (part of Mobilink, now Jazz) and Micronet Broadband (then trading as Nayatel) filed complaints alleging PTCL overcharged bandwidth to competing ISPs while subsidizing its own DSL tariffs to undercut rivals.

In 2016, PTCL and Bahria Town tried to block ISPs from deploying fiber infrastructure in Bahria Town, effectively preserving a monopoly in that locality. The Competition Commission of Pakistan issued a show-cause notice, levied a PKR 2 million fine on Bahria Town, and ordered it to allow ISPs including Nayatel to lay fiber networks.

On 14 February 2024, Nayatel lodged a complaint with the Pakistan Telecommunication Authority (PTA), alleging that PTCL blocked its IP traffic after Nayatel changed its bandwidth sourcing model to purchase from authorized resellers (such as Telenor Pakistan and Zong CMPak), hence bypassing direct PTCL bandwidth contracts. PTCL reportedly refused to route Nayatel's traffic when bandwidth was purchased via resellers.

In more recent scrutiny, the Competition Appellate Tribunal upheld CCP's earlier ruling against PTCL and other Long Distance International (LDI) operators regarding the International Clearing House (ICH) arrangement (2012), which had centralized inbound international calls via PTCL's gateway. The Tribunal reduced the penalty rate to 2 % of turnover from ICH operations but confirmed its anti-competitive nature.

As of September 2025, the CCP has publicly accused PTCL of withholding data, delaying disclosures, and blocking regulatory scrutiny during the PTCL-Telenor merger process claiming that PTCL has a pattern of challenging PTA decisions in court, delaying interconnect obligations, and abusing dominance in multiple telecom segments. Furthermore, CCP announced recovery of Rs 495 million in penalties from PTCL and LINKdotNET in the ICH case of which Rs 458 million was from PTCL, confirming enforcement of its antitrust rulings.

== Phone number format change ==
PTCL had started with 10 digit numbers for landline telephones. The first three (in case of smaller cities, 4 or 5) signified the area code (e.g. 042 for Lahore) and the rest (7 for large cities, 6 or 5 for smaller ones) were the subscribers number. Due to the large demand for landlines in Lahore and Karachi, in 2009, PTCL decided to increase the 7-digit subscriber numbers to 8-digits, adding "9" before existing Government numbers and "3" before the others (e.g. the number 042–7878787 before 2009, was changed to 042–37878787).

== 5G trials ==
PTCL successfully carried out 5G trials in its Islamabad headquarters in February 2021 and achieved download speeds up to 1.7 Gbit/s in their testing environment.

== Acquisition of Telenor Pakistan ==
After Telenor ASA announced in November 2022 that it would exit the Pakistani market, PTCL announced in December 2023 its intention to acquire Telenor Pakistan for US$493 million. PTCL Group CEO Hatem Bamatraf described the acquisition as a strategic move to strengthen digital infrastructure and improve customer experience.

On 1 October 2025, the Competition Commission of Pakistan (CCP) granted conditional approval for PTCL's full acquisition of Telenor Pakistan and Orion Towers. The transaction was reported to be valued at around US$400 million, following a detailed regulatory review.

Following the approval, the CCP directed PTCL to unbundle its operations to maintain fair competition and prevent anti-competitive practices. The order required separate boards, independent financials, and strict non-discrimination in services between the merged entities. Despite the CCP approval, reports suggested that the merger faced delays due to regulatory concerns. The CCP criticized PTCL for failing to submit investment plans and properly separate Ufone and PTCL operations.

On 6 December 2025, the PTA granted PTCL a No Objection Certificate (NOC) for the acquisition of Telenor Pakistan.

PTCL completed its acquisition of Telenor Pakistan and Orion Towers (Private) Limited on 31 December 2025.

== See also ==
- List of dialling codes of Pakistan
- Ministry of Information Technology and Telecommunication
- Telephone numbers in Pakistan
- Ufone - A wholly owned cellular subsidiary of PTCL
