= Pakbugs =

Cybercrime

Pakbugs was a Pakistani-based security forum offering security releases updates, discussion of hacking, credit card fraud, phishing and other forms of computer crime; as well as trading in malware, bank login details and stolen credit card numbers. In 2009 user details were disclosed publicly and the forum was eventually shut down after multiple raids by Pakistani Federal Investigation Agency on its members in 2010, in which five individuals were arrested, with the alleged founder suspected to remain at large in Riyadh.

In addition to being a crime forum, PAKbugs was also the nomenclature of a group, used by individuals on numerous occasions to claim responsibility and attribution for defacement of several high-profile Web sites.

Also, the forum offered resources and courses to pen-testing, programming and a lot of IT subjects, from beginner to advanced. A lot of users were registered to learn about programming, security, software engineering.

The forum re-emerged in 2013 and was responsible for hacking and defacing .pk domains, along with the Google Saint Helena, Google Uganda and Google Morocco websites. The group also defaced websites of five major Pakistani banks, including Soneri Bank besides and a few Indian and Middle Eastern banks.
