= Easypaisa =

Pakistani digital bank

easypaisa
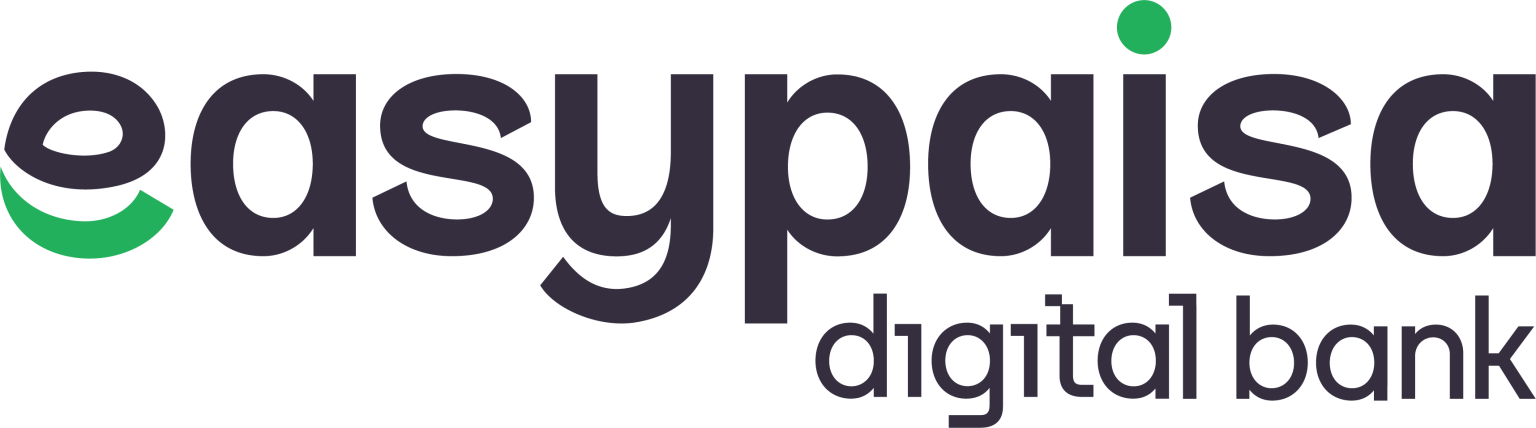
- Type: Private
- Industry: Banking
- Founded: October 2009; 17 years ago
- Headquarters: Karachi, Pakistan
- Key people: Jahanzeb Khan (CEO)
- Products: Digital wallet
- Website: easypaisa.com.pk

Easypaisa Bank Limited, stylized as easypaisa, is a Pakistani digital bank based in Karachi. It provides services such as mobile wallet, mobile payments, and branchless banking.

== History ==
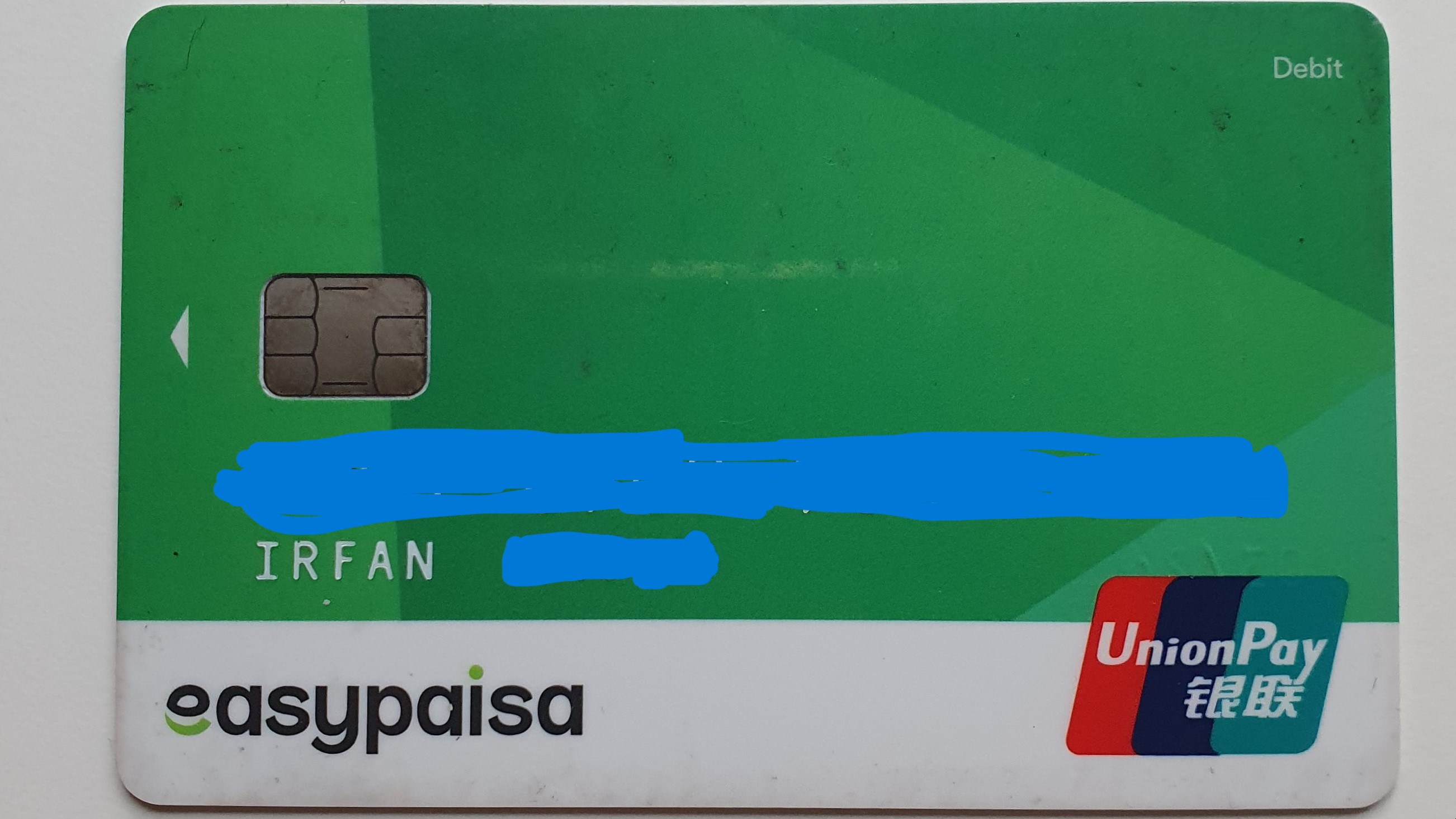
The picture shows an EasyPaisa debit card powered by UnionPay. The card number and name are usually at the front.

Easypaisa was founded in 2009 by Telenor Microfinance Bank as a money transfer service via USSD (Unstructured Supplementary Service Data) channels. Telenor Microfinance Bank was originally founded as Tameer Microfinance Bank, which was acquired by Telenor Pakistan in 2008. Later, in 2018, Ant Group acquired a stake in Telenor Microfinance Bank via its subsidiary Ant Financial. In its early years, Easypaisa followed an over-the-counter (OTC) model, users could transact without maintaining a wallet account. By 2011, around 1.3 million customers had conducted 1.9 million transactions worth US$39.2 million in flows. As of 2012, it had processed over 100 million transactions with throughput exceeding US$1.4 billion.

During the COVID-19 pandemic in Pakistan, digital adoption of financial services increased significantly. By 2020, Easypaisa’s active app user base had grown to around 3.44 million, an increase of approximately 54% compared to the previous year. While its annual transaction value rose by about 64% to reach PKR 1.5 trillion.

By the end of the 2023 financial year, Easypaisa had processed more than 2.1 billion transactions with a total value exceeding PKR 7 trillion. The platform recorded 9.6 million monthly active users, a year-on-year increase of 32%, while its parent company, Telenor Microfinance Bank, reported a user base of over 13 million. Between June and November 2022, the platform facilitated more than 400,000 donation transactions worth over PKR 100 million, supporting national flood relief efforts.

In January 2023, Easypaisa introduced a debit card service for account holders, issued in collaboration with Union pay. Two years later, in January 2025, the company received Pakistan’s first digital bank licence from the State Bank of Pakistan and subsequently announced the commencement of commercial operations.

== See also ==
- JazzCash
