= .pk =

Internet country code top-level domain for Pakistan

- Introduced: 3 June 1992 (34 years ago)
- TLD type: Country code top-level domain
- Status: Active
- Registry: PKNIC
- Sponsor: PKNIC
- Intended use: Entities connected with Pakistan
- Actual use: Popular in Pakistan
- Registration restrictions: Some subdomains have restrictions, but some are unrestricted
- Structure: Registrations have been at third level beneath second-level labels, but second-level names are being opened up in 2005
- Documents: Domain registration policy
- Dispute policies: UDRP (amended)
- DNSSEC: Yes
- Registry website: PK NIC

.pk is the designated Internet country code top-level domain (ccTLD) for Pakistan. PKNIC is the only organisation endorsed by the Government of Pakistan to undertake the administration of 'pk' domain names. PKNIC is a non-profit making, non-statutory, member-based corporation established in June 1992.

== Domain categories ==
All new domains that are registered under .pk must belong to one of the following second-level or third-level domains.

Domain	Eligible applicant
.pk	Available to anyone, local or overseas individuals or entities
.com.pk	Commercial entities registered in Pakistan
.org.pk	Non-profit organisations
.net.pk	Network service providers
.ac.pk	Educational and academic services
.edu.pk	Accredited educational Institutes
.res.pk	research institutes
.gov.pk	Federal ministries of the Government of Pakistan
.mil.pk	Pakistan Military organisations
.gok.pk	Territorial ministries and departments of the Government of Azad Jammu and Kashmir
.gob.pk	Provincial ministries and departments of the Government of Balochistan
.gkp.pk	Provincial ministries and departments of the Government of Khyber Pakhtunkhwa
.gop.pk	Provincial ministries and departments of the Government of Punjab
.gos.pk	Provincial ministries and departments of the Government of Sindh
.gog.pk	Territorial ministries and departments of the Government of Gilgit-Baltistan
.ltd.pk	limited companies
.web.pk	Individual websites
.fam.pk	Family and Individuals
.biz.pk	General Business, Promotional

== Urdu domain ==
پاکستان.
- TLD type: Country code top-level domain
- Status: Active

In 2011 a new top domain was registered for Pakistan, intended for domain names in the local language. The domain, پاکستان., was approved by the ICANN Board on 7 January 2011 to represent Pakistan in the Perso-Arabic script. On 4 February 2011, the IDN ccTLD was delegated to the National Telecommunication Corporation and the zone was added to the root servers in February 2017.

== See also ==
- Communications in Pakistan
- Internationalized domain name
- Telecommunications in Pakistan
