= Special Communications Organization =

Pakistani telecommunications organisation

- Native name: خصوصی مواصلاتی تنظیم
- Company type: Public
- Industry: Telecommunications
- Founded: July 1976; 49 years ago
- Headquarters: Rawalpindi, Pakistan
- Area served: Azad Kashmir, Gilgit Baltistan
- Key people: Director General SCO, Major General - Umar Ahmad Shah
- Services: Landline; Wireless local loop 4G; GSM; Internet
- Revenue: ▲ Rs. 5.5 billion (US$20 million) (2019-2020)
- Owner: Ministry of IT & Telecommunications
- Website: SCO Pakistan

The Special Communications Organization (SCO) is a Pakistani public sector organization operated by MoIT&T. SCO plays a role in providing telecommunication services in Azad Kashmir and Gilgit Baltistan to almost 1.8 million people, a quarter of the total population. It operates its digital financial services under the brand name S-Paisa.

== History ==
SCO is a public sector organization working under Ministry of Information Technology and Telecommunication (MoITT) of the Government of Pakistan (GOP). It was founded on 16 July 1976 to develop, operate and maintain telecom services in Azad Jammu & Kashmir and Gilgit Baltistan after then Prime Minister Zulfikar Ali Bhutto “found himself cut off from the rest of the world” during a trip to Kashmir and Gilgit. While expanding in remote areas with difficult conditions, according to the Pamir Times, SCO had 72 employees die.

The Chief Minister of Gilgit-Baltistan, Hafiz Hafeezur Rehman, in 2015 proposed that SCO connect the unconnected parts of the Karakuram Highway with cellular networks, and to study the feasibility of expanding services along the road connecting Pakistan and China.

Over a period of time, SCO has developed significant infrastructure, including laying a 2500 kilometer optical fiber cable network. In 2017, SCO was the largest telecom network/service provider in the area, equally focusing on urban and rural areas development. SCO provided telecom services to both the public and private sectors (the general populace) in Azad Jammu & Kashmir and Gilgit Baltistan region. It provided telecom services such as voice to data as part of one platform.

SCO in 2017 launched digital financial services under the brand name S-Paisa.

In 2019, SCO and Zong agreed to cooperate on providing services in FATA, Azad Jammu & Kashmir (AJ&K) and Gilgit-Baltistan. They furthered the agreement in 2021, at which point SCO Director General Major General Shahid Siddique oversaw SCO. JazzCash integrated SCO's mobile network into its platform in 2023.

It was involved in the development of a software technology park in Nasirabad, Hunza in 2024. In 2024, it remained owned by the Pakistani government.

== Services ==
=== NGMS ===
SCO’s mobile network, SCOM, stands as the first telecom network provider which focuses on providing 2G/3G and 4G services in the urban and rural parts of Gilgit-Baltistan and Azad Kashmir in both the Public and Private sector. SCO is also the largest backbone service provider in Azad Jammu & Kashmir and Gilgit-Baltistan, having more than 4,800 kilometers of optical fiber in the region.

The government of Pakistan has assigned SCO to lay down 820 kilometers long Pakistan-China Fiber Optic Project, an optical fiber cable that will enhance telecommunication in the Gilgit-Baltistan region while offering Pakistan a fifth route by which to transmit telecommunication traffic. As of February 2018, Special Communications Organization (SCO) has been given the NOC to start trials for 3G and 4G (NGMS) services in Azad Jammu & Kashmir and Gilgit Baltistan. The service was available in Mirpur, Muzaffarabad, Kotli, Skardu, and Gilgit free of cost until trials had been completed.

SCOM is the first network to have installed a mobile tower at the K2 base camp where previously satellite phones would be used for communication.

Frequencies used on SCOM's Network
Frequency	Protocol	Band	Class	Channel Width
1800 MHz	GSM		2G	?
2100 MHz	UMTS/HSPA+	1	3G	?
1800 MHz	4G	3	4G	?

=== Broadband ===
In addition to the mobile services, SCO is also providing wired fixed line services to almost 20,900 people by which DSL and WiFi services are provided under the brand name of SNET. SCO plans to deploy FTTH system to provide gigabit broadband services in 2020.

=== Banking ===
Mobile Financial Services - "S-Paisa" In July, 2019; A brand envisioned as ‘S-Paisa,’ is aimed to empower more than 6 million people of Azad Jammu & Kashmir and Gilgit-Baltistan through state-of-the-art, convenient and secure branchless banking services. The partnership of JS Bank with the forefront telco will financially empower the un-banked in these regions.

== Controversies ==
As of 2006, SCO had often been criticized for poor performance and creating obstacles for other carriers in providing telecom services in AJK (Azad Jammu and Kashmir). SCO was given sole monopoly in AJK, and the area as a result suffered and lacked in modern telecom services. After the 2005 Kashmir earthquake, significant loss of life was attributed to not having communication facilities in the area. Subsequent protests resulted in the government of Pakistan opening up the Azad Jammu and Kashmir for other mobile operators, which significantly improved mobile services in the area.

However, as of 2014, Azad Jammu and Kashmir still lagged behind in broadband services due to the strict hold that SCO had on the network access. In 2016, SCO was criticized for creating hurdles in opening up 3G/4G in the AJK, as it was not able to upgrade its network, and was certain to lose market share if other operators were allowed to offer 3G/4G services. In 2016, the Government of Pakistan approved funding for SCO to upgrade its network, potentially removing this hurdle for 3G/4G services in AJ&K. It launched 3G/4G in August 2017.

== See also ==
- List of telecommunication companies in Pakistan
- List of dialing codes of Pakistan
- Telephone numbers in Pakistan
- Ministry of Information Technology and Telecommunication
- Pakistan Army
