= Warid Pakistan =

Pakistani telecommunication operator

Warid
- Life Ka Network (lit. Network of life)
- Native name: وارد
- Type: Telecommunication operator
- Industry: Telecommunication
- Founded: 2004
- Defunct: 26 November 2015
- Fate: Merged with Jazz Pakistan
- Successor: Jazz
- Products: Mobile services Data services Mobile banking Blackberry solution
- Website: waridtel.com

Warid (Arabic: وريد Urdu: وارد) was a GSM and LTE-based mobile operator in Pakistan. It commenced commercial operations on 23 May 2005 by the Abu Dhabi Group.

Warid Pakistan was Pakistan's fourth largest GSM mobile service provider and fifth largest mobile service in terms of subscriber base of over 12.9 million. It had a market share of 9% among Pakistani cellular operators.

On 26 November 2015 VimpelCom and Dhabi Group agreed to merge Mobilink and Warid Pakistan into a single company. On 6 January 2017 the combined CEO of Mobilink and Warid Pakistan announced the launch of new brand Jazz. Mobilink ceased to exist on 10 January 2017 whereas Warid Pakistan as a brand continued for a year.

== History ==
The Pakistan Telecommunication Authority awarded two mobile telephony licenses to Telenor Pakistan and Space Telecom on 24 April 2004. The license for Space Telecom was cancelled after it missed a dead line to make a 50% down payment of the offered price. Thereafter PTA offered next highest bid winner company, Warid Pakistan.

The license was bid and acquired through parent company of Warid Pakistan, Abu Dhabi Group led by the then CEO Bashir Tahir for US$291 million.

On 23 May 2005 Warid Pakistan commercially started operating. Mr Hamid Farooq is appointed as the CEO of the company. Initially it covered 28 major cities of the country, which is so far the largest coverage in the first phase of roll-out by the first investment of US$150 million. Within 80 days, Warid Pakistan secured 1 million customers with 7% market share.

In second phase of investment of US$1 billion, Warid Pakistan launched operations in other cities of Pakistan. It secured another 3.4 million subscribers with 10% market share. The first anniversary of Warid Pakistan marked 9.7 million subscribers.

In 2007, Singapore Telecommunications bought a 30-per cent stake in Warid Pakistan for about $758 million. That stake purchase gave Warid Pakistan an enterprise value of about $2.5 billion.

Warid Pakistan's first CEO, Hamid Farooq, resigned in November 2007, and Marwan Zawaydeh subsequently joined the company as the second CEO. By the end of 2009, Warid Pakistan had further invested US$1 billion in network expansion.

In October 2012, Warid Pakistan appointed Muneer Farooqi as the new CEO.

In January 2013, SingTel sold its stake back for $150 million and retained the right to receive 7.5 percent of the net proceeds from any future sale, public offering, or merger of Warid Pakistan.

=== Merger with Mobilink ===
Warid Pakistan previously announced its merger with Mobilink in November 2015. The case was under review at Pakistan Telecommunication Authority. After scrutiny PTA finally approved the merger in July 2016. The companies have become a single brand.

== See also ==
- Warid Telecom International
- Jazz (company)
- List of mobile phone companies in Pakistan
