= Pakistan Digital Authority =

Statutory authority of the Government of Pakistan for national digital transformation

Agency overview
- Formed: 2025
- Jurisdiction: Government of Pakistan
- Headquarters: Islamabad, Pakistan
- Parent agency: Government of Pakistan
- Key document: Digital Nation Pakistan Act, 2025

The Pakistan Digital Authority (PDA) is a statutory body established by the Government of Pakistan under the Digital Nation Pakistan Act, 2025 to modernise and develop the foundations of a digital economy.

== History ==
The Digital Nation Pakistan Act, 2025 was enacted on 29 January 2025 with immediate effect. It established the Pakistan Digital Authority as a corporate body, with the ability to enter contracts, hold property, and engage in legal proceedings.

== Governance ==
On August 19, 2025, the Prime Minister appointed Dr. Sohail Munir as the authority's chairperson, and Dr Muhammad J. Sear as one of the two members.

The National Digital Commission, chaired by the Prime Minister, and an Oversight Committee, led by the Minister of Information Technology and Telecommunications, monitor the performance of the PDA and provide strategic direction.

== See also ==
- Ministry of Information Technology and Telecommunication (Pakistan)
- National Database and Registration Authority
- Pakistan Telecommunication Authority
- Securities and Exchange Commission of Pakistan
- State Bank of Pakistan
