= JazzCash =

Pakistani mobile payment service provider

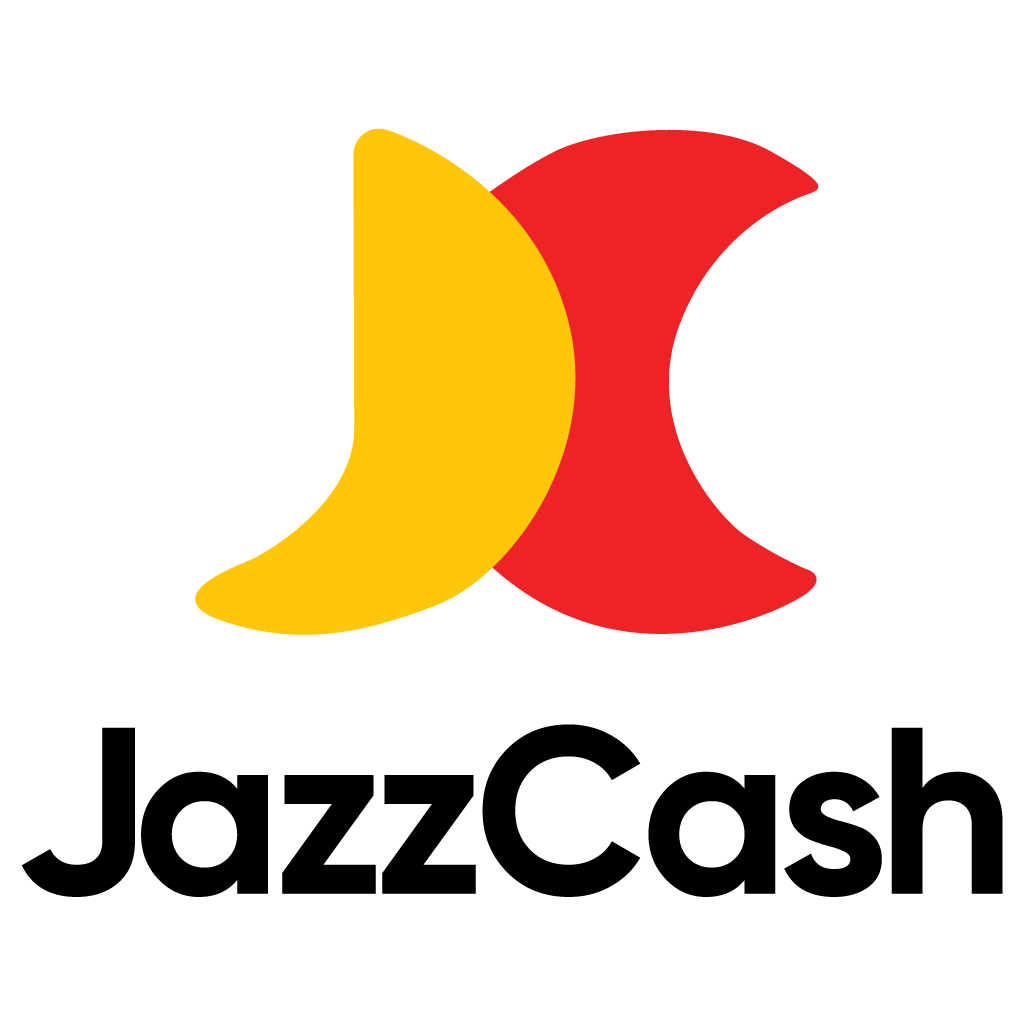
- Native name: جاز کیش
- Formerly: MobiCash (2012–2016)
- Type: Private
- Industry: Mobile financial services
- Founded: November 29, 2012; 13 years ago
- Key people: Aamir Ibrahim (CEO)
- Products: Online payments; Mobile payments; Digital wallet
- Parent: Jazz
- Website: jazzcash.com.pk

JazzCash, formerly known as MobiCash, is a Pakistani mobile wallet, mobile payments, and branchless banking services provider. It was launched in November 2012 as MobiCash by Mobilink (now Jazz) in partnership with their subsidiary bank Mobilink Microfinance Bank.

It also provides digital payment service through QR code in partnership with Masterpass.

== History ==
JazzCash was founded in 2012 as MobiCash by Mobilink (now Jazz) as a joint venture with Waseela Bank, which was later renamed as Mobilink Microfinance Bank. In 2016, MobiCash was rebranded as JazzCash following the unification of Mobilink and Warid under the Jazz brand.

In 2020, JazzCash partnered with Payoneer to enable users to withdraw funds from their Payoneer accounts directly through their JazzCash wallets to facilitate Pakistani freelancers. More than 110,000 of such accounts have been linked to JazzCash.

By mid-2020, JazzCash had exceeded eight million monthly active mobile account users. In the previous twelve months, it processed around 900 million transactions with a total value of approximately PKR 1.7 trillion. By June 2024, the platform reported over 11 million active app users and a registered user base of about 44 million. It also maintained a nationwide network of more than 245,000 agents and 300,000 merchants, with over 30% of users being female. In 2024, JazzCash partnered with DGPays to enhance its e-commerce payment gateway. During the first three quarters of 2024, it processed more than 110 million transactions through its merchant network, reflecting significant growth in online payments.

== See also ==
- Easypaisa
- Raast
