= Telephone density =

Statistic

Telephone density or teledensity is the number of telephone connections for every hundred individuals living within an area. It varies widely across the nations and also between urban and rural areas within a country. Telephone density has significant correlation with the per capita GDP of the area. It is also used as an indicator of the purchasing power of the middle class of the country or specific region.

== Determining telephone density ==
In earlier days teledensity was computed as the number of fixed telephone lines per hundred inhabitants. But this method has become less significant with an increasing number of countries register a trend of mobile cellular subscribers outnumbering the fixed line connections. Hence, as an alternative, mobidensity or mobile cellular subscribers per hundred inhabitants was proposed. Since this method caused disadvantage to some countries where the fixed line network is well established, or others where the mobile network is still in its initial stage of development, effective teledensity has been proposed by International Telecommunication Union (ITU) as the solution, which is defined as either fixed line connections or mobile subscribers per hundred inhabitants – whichever is higher.

Fixed telephone lines per hundred inhabitants is calculated by dividing the number of fixed telephone lines by the total population and then multiplying by 100. Fixed telephone lines include PSTN, WLL, ISDN and DSL. A single ISDN or DSL subscriber connection may cater to multiple voice channels. This leads to a lack of global standard in the computation of fixed line density and hence ITU has recommended that all the countries shall provide the methodology of calculation of this figure in order to enhance comparability.

Mobidensity or mobile cellular subscribers per hundred inhabitants is obtained by dividing the number of mobile cellular subscribers by the population and multiplying by 100. While computing Mobile cellular subscribers users of both post-paid subscriptions and pre-paid accounts are included. Inactive prepaid connections where a call has not been made or received within the last 3 months, are excluded.

== Teledensity and GDP ==
The correlation between teledensity and per capita GDP could be represented by a straight line in a logarithmic graph. This relation was first mentioned by A.G.W. Jipp. a German engineer, in his book published in 1962. The graph is helpful to compare the telephone infrastructure development of different countries or regions, on the basis of teledensity.
