= Competition Commission of Pakistan =

Agency for enforcement of economic competition laws in Pakistan

Agency overview
- Formed: 2007; 19 years ago
- Preceding agency: Monopoly Control Authority (MCA)
- Jurisdiction: Pakistan
- Headquarters: Islamabad
- Agency executive: Farid Ahmad Tarar, Chairman
- Key document: Competition Act, 2010.
- Website: cc.gov.pk

The Competition Commission of Pakistan (CCP) (Urdu: کمیشن رقابت پاکستان), formerly Monopoly Control Authority, is an independent agency quasi-regulatory, quasi-judicial body of the Government of Pakistan for the enforcement of economic competition laws in Pakistan that helps ensure healthy competition. It was created in 2007 by the President of Pakistan through the promulgation of the Competition Ordinance, 2007 replacing Monopoly Control Authority, later Parliament of Pakistan passed Competition Act, 2010 to give legal cover and powers to the commission. The Commission was established to provide for free competition in all spheres of commercial and economic activity to enhance economic efficiency and to protect consumers from anti competitive behavior.

== History ==
Prior to the Competition Ordinance, 2007, Pakistan had an anti-monopoly law namely 'Monopolies and Restrictive Trade Practices (Control and Prevention) Ordinance' (MRTPO) 1970. The Monopoly Control Authority (MCA) was the organization to administer this Law. Pakistan decided to update its monopoly law after becoming a member of the World Trade Organisation in 1995, and thereby becoming increasingly aware that if it wanted to avail of the benefits of trade and globalization, it needed a new competition law and policy framework to improve the competitiveness of its domestic markets. To this end, Pakistan approached the World Bank for technical assistance, and in 2006, a team led by World Bank experts commenced discussions with Pakistani officials, economists and lawyers, to develop the parameters of such a law and policy. In 2007, the World Bank team submitted its report to the Pakistani government and with it, a draft law was prepared by them. The Competition Commission of Pakistan (CCP) was established on 2 October 2007 under the Competition Ordinance, 2007, which was repromulgated in November 2009. The law was later promulgated as Competition Act, 2010.
The Competition Act, 2010 is based on international best practices, considers the current economic realities, and corrects the deficiencies of the Monopolies and Restrictive Trade Practices Ordinance (MRTPO) of 1970 related to definitional aspects, coverage, penalties, and other procedural matters. It covers all sectors of the economy, regardless of their public or private ownership.

== Workings ==
The Competition Act, 2010, prohibits undertakings from abusing a dominant position in the market, participating in anti-competitive agreements, and resorting to deceptive marketing practices that could result in a transaction based on incorrect or inaccurate information. It also reviews mergers between undertakings that could result in significant impediments to effective competition. Through advocacy, the Commission encourages voluntary compliance and promotes a 'competition culture' to take root in the economy. Anti-competitive business conduct can have harmful effects on the level of competition in the economy and thus, on consumers.

The Competition Commission of Pakistan under Competition Act, 2010 principally deals with

- Abuse of Dominant Position (Section 3)
- Prohibited Agreements (Section 4)
  - Section 4 is divided into three sub-sections:
    - Section 4(1) states that a practice may be anticompetitive if it has the object or effect restricting competition
    - Section 4(2) provides a non-exhaustive list of the types of agreements that are prohibited under section 4(1)
    - Section 4(3) declares that any agreement contrary to section 4(1) shall be void.
- Deceptive Marketing Practices (Section 10)
- Approval of Mergers (Section 11)
- Exceptions (Section 5 to 9)
  - Section 5 of the Act allows parties to obtain exemptions for their agreements if they are able to establish their pro-competitive effects in terms of section 9.

== Global Enforcement Rating ==
- Global Competition Review (GCR) awarded three-star rating to the Competition Commission of Pakistan in its annual ranking of the world's top antitrust/competition authorities. The Commission improved upon its previous accomplishments. 'The Competition Commission of Pakistan has made several substantial strides in the past couple of years and re-established itself as one of the region's key competition enforcers", the GCR noted in its brief in the rating enforcement. The Commission's rating brought it at par with the competition authorities of countries including Switzerland, South Africa, Belgium, Israel, and Romania.
- Voluntary Peer Review of Competition Law and Policy by UNCTAD

== Research and publications ==
The Competition Commission of Pakistan (CCP) has been involved in conducting research and producing publications to advance the understanding and implementation of competition law in the country. The commission conducts comprehensive market studies and investigations to identify anti-competitive practices, including abuse of dominance, cartelization, collusive behavior, barriers to entry, deceptive marketing practices, and other competition issues. Moreover, the commission closely monitors and analyzes the sectorial competition environment across various sectors to ensure fair competition and protect consumer interests. This research serves as a foundation for the commission's policy-making and enforcement decisions. Moreover, the CCP has published a wide array of reports, guidelines, and research papers on competition-related issues. These publications cover topics such as merger control, abuse of dominance, cartels, and anti-competitive practices.

== Advocacy ==
The Competition Commission of Pakistan (CCP) is actively engaged in advocating for competition issues in the country. It recognizes the importance of creating awareness and understanding among businesses, policymakers, and the general public about the benefits of competition and the detrimental effects of anti-competitive practices. The commission conducts advocacy campaigns and outreach programs to disseminate information and educate stakeholders on competition law, fair trade practices, and the importance of a competitive market economy. The commission organizes workshops, seminars, and awareness sessions to engage with various sectors and share insights on competition-related matters. Through its advocacy efforts, the commission encourages voluntary compliance with competition laws, promotes fair business practices, and fosters a competitive environment conducive to innovation, efficiency, and consumer welfare. The commission has published various guidelines for this purpose. The Competition Commission of Pakistan (CCP) has published comprehensive guidelines on competition compliance to provide businesses with a clear understanding of competition laws and to promote compliance. These guidelines serve as a resource for companies operating in Pakistan, helping them navigate the intricacies of competition law and avoid engaging in anti-competitive practices. The guidelines cover a wide range of topics, including horizontal and vertical agreements, abuse of dominance, mergers and acquisitions, and leniency programs. They outline the prohibited conduct, explain key concepts, and offer practical insights on how to ensure compliance.
