= List of telecommunication companies in Pakistan =

| Rank | Operator | MCC / MNC Tuple | Number Prefix | Technology | | Services | Ownership | Total Subscribers as of October 2026 |
| Rank | Operator | MCC / MNC Tuple | Number Prefix | Mainland Pakistan | AJ&K/Gilgit-Baltistan | Services | Ownership | Total Subscribers as of October 2026 |
|---|---|---|---|---|---|---|---|---|
| 1 | Jazz (PMCL - Pakistan Mobile Communications Limited) | 410 / 01 410 / 07 | 030x 032x | 2G: 900 MHz (GPRS, EDGE) 4G: 900 (B8) / 1800 (B3) / 2100 (B1) / 2500 (B41) MHz (LTE/LTE-A) 5G: 700 (n28) / 2300 (n40) / 2500 (n41) / 3500 (n78) MHz (5G NR) | 900 / 1800 MHz (GPRS, EDGE) | Mobile Broadband VoLTE / VoWiFi Postpaid & Prepaid Mobile Banking (JazzCash) | VEON Ltd. (100%) | 77.25 million |
| 2 | Ufone (PTML - Pak Telecommunication Mobile Limited) | 410 / 03 410 / 06 | 033x 034x | 2G: 900 MHz (GPRS, EDGE) 4G: 850 (B5) / 900 (B8) / 1800 (B3) / 2100 (B1) MHz (LTE/LTE-A) 5G: 2500 (n41) / 3500 (n78) MHz (5G NR) | Roams on SCO | Mobile Broadband VoLTE / VoWiFi Postpaid & Prepaid Mobile Banking (U-Paisa) | PTCL (100%) | 76.55 million |
| 3 | Zong (CMPak Ltd - China Mobile Pakistan Limited) | 410 / 04 | 031x 0370x, 0371x | 2G: 900 / 1800 MHz (GPRS, EDGE) 3G: 2100 MHz (UMTS, HSPA+, DC-HSPA+) 4G: 900 (B8) / 1800 (B3) / 2100 (B1) MHz (LTE/LTE-A) 5G: 2500 (n41) / 3500 (n78) MHz (5G NR) | 900 / 1800 MHz (GPRS, EDGE) | Mobile Broadband VoLTE / VoWiFi Postpaid & Prepaid Mobile Banking (PayMax) | China Mobile Communications Group Co., Ltd (100%) | 56.55 million |
AJ&K/Gilgit-Baltistan
| — | SCO (Special Communications Organization) | 410 / 05 | 0355x | Roams on Ufone | 2G: 900 MHz (GPRS, EDGE) 3G: 2100 MHz (UMTS, HSPA+) 4G: 850 (B5) / 1800 (B3) MHz (LTE/LTE-A) | Fixed Broadband Mobile Broadband Postpaid & Prepaid Mobile Banking (S-Paisa) | Government of Pakistan, Ministry of Information Technology and Telecommunication | 2.10 million |
Mobile virtual network operators (MVNO)
| — | Onic | 410 / 03 410 / 06 | 0339x | 2G: 900 MHz (GPRS, EDGE) 4G: 850 (B5) / 900 (B8) / 1800 (B3) / 2100 (B1) MHz (LTE/LTE-A) 5G: 2500 (n41) / 3500 (n78) MHz (5G NR) | Roams on SCO | Mobile Broadband Postpaid & Prepaid | Ufone | N/A |
| — | ROX | 410 / 01 410 / 07 | 030x 032x | 2G: 900 MHz (GPRS, EDGE) 4G: 900 (B8) / 1800 (B3) / 2100 (B1) / 2500 (B41) MHz (LTE/LTE-A) 5G: 700 (n28) / 2300 (n40) / 2500 (n41) / 3500 (n78) MHz (5G NR) | 900 / 1800 MHz (GPRS, EDGE) | Mobile Broadband VoLTE / VoWiFi Postpaid & Prepaid Mobile Banking (JazzCash) | Jazz | N/A |

== See also ==
- List of dialling codes in Pakistan
- List of mobile codes in Pakistan
- Telephone numbers in Pakistan
