= Telenor Pakistan =

Telephone operator company

- lit. Make it possible

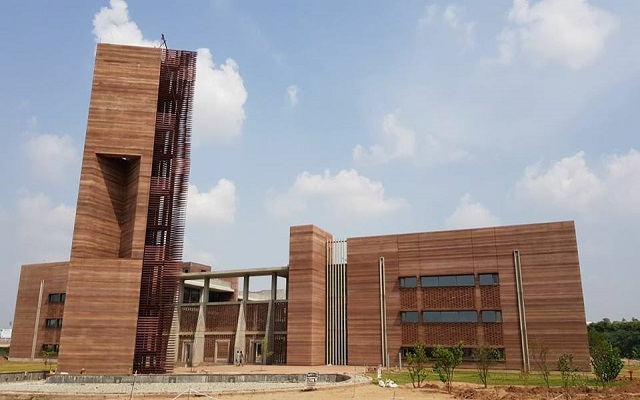
- Headquarters in Islamabad
- Type: Subsidiary
- Industry: Telecommunications
- Founded: April 2004; 22 years ago
- Founder: Telenor
- Defunct: 1 July 2026
- Fate: Acquired by PTCL
- Successor: Ufone
- Headquarters: Islamabad, Pakistan
- Area served: Pakistan
- Key people: Hatem Bamatraf (CEO)
- Products: Mobile Telephony; Internet; Devices; SIM; operator
- Revenue: ▲NOK 4,457 million (2024)
- Parent: PTCL
- Website: www.telenor.com.pk

Telenor Pakistan (Pvt.) Limited (Urdu: ٹیلی نار پاکستان محدود) was a Pakistani mobile network operator headquartered in Islamabad, Pakistan.

Telenor started its operations in Pakistan in March 2005. Over the years, Telenor invested more than $2 billion in terms of foreign direct investment (FDI) in Pakistan. PTCL acquired Telenor Pakistan on 31 December 2025.

Till August 2026, Telenor Pakistan had a total subscriber base of 44 million in Pakistan, among which 29 million were 4G/LTE subscribers. As of September 2026, the combined subscriber base of Telenor Pakistan and Ufone is 76 million.

== History ==
The old Telenor Pakistan logo, used from 2015 to 2018.

Telenor, a Norwegian telecommunications company, acquired a license for providing GSM services in Pakistan in April 2004, and launched its services commercially in Karachi, Islamabad, and Rawalpindi on 15 March 2005; it expanded its services to Lahore, Faisalabad and Hyderabad on 23 March 2005. Telenor Pakistan's corporate headquarters are in Islamabad, with regional offices in Peshawar, Lahore, Faisalabad, Multan, Hyderabad, Quetta and Karachi.

In November 2017, Telenor Pakistan inaugurated its new headquarters building in Islamabad, named '345' after Telenor's number dialing prefix '0345'. The new headquarter was built at a cost of $80 million.

=== Acquisition by PTCL Group ===
After Telenor ASA announced in November 2022 that they would leave the Pakistani market, it was announced that PTCL Group would acquire 100% of Telenor Pakistan on 14 December 2023, subject to regulatory approvals. The Business Recorder reported that the sale was settled at 108 billion Pakistani rupees (US$385 million), while Dawn and NRK reported a price of 5.3 billion Norwegian kroner (US$493 million).

On 1 October 2025, the CCP approved PTCL's acquisition of Telenor Pakistan, this was followed by the PTA's approval 6 December 2025.

PTCL completed its acquisition of Telenor Pakistan and Orion Towers (Private) Limited on 31 December 2025.

PTCL Group CEO Hatem Bamatraf announced that the Telenor Pakistan brand will be dissolved once the merger between Telenor Pakistan and Ufone is complete and all the necessary approvals have been given by the regulatory authorities.

==== Merger with Ufone ====
On 1 July 2026, the Islamabad High Court approved the merger between Telenor Pakistan and Pak Telecommunication Mobile Limited (Ufone).

As part of the integration between both networks, Ufone has migrated to the Telenor '345' headquarters building in Gulberg Greens, Islamabad. Hatem Bamatraf, who previously served as the Group CEO for both PTCL and Ufone will now lead the MergeCo as the new CEO. PTCL will operate as a separate entity with its own board and CEO.

== Operations ==
=== Coverage ===
Telenor Pakistan covers more than 80% of Pakistan's population in urban and rural areas with a network of over 12,000 cell sites of which 80% are 3G and 70% are 4G enabled. The company has been awarded a number of projects under Universal Service Fund (USF) of which the one currently in progress in the Broadband for Sustainable Development (BSD) program under which more than 100 new cell sites will be established to bring connectivity to 1.7 million in Dera Ismail Khan and Mohmand Agency. In the past, Telenor worked on USF Projects for cell site installation in Bahawalpur-Cholistan district in 2009 and provision of 3G services in Kohistan district in 2017.

=== Radio Frequency ===
Frequencies used on Telenor Pakistan's Network
Frequency	Protocol	Band	Class	Channel width
900 MHz	GSM/GPRS/EDGE	8	2G	4.8 MHz
2100 MHz	UMTS/HSDPA/HSPA+	1	3G	5 MHz (Mainland)
2100 MHz	4G/LTE-A	1	4G / 4.5G	15 MHz (AJ&K/GB)
1800 MHz	4G/LTE-A	3	4G / 4.5G	5 MHz / 10 MHz
850 MHz (Mainland)	4G/LTE-A	5	4G / 4.5G	10 MHz

=== Sales and distribution ===
Telenor Pakistan's distribution network has over 220,000 touch points across Pakistan that include franchises, sahulat ghars and retailers that offer GSM products and Easypaisa services. In 2017, company owned customer sales and service centers were converted to Digital Customer Touch Points that include Self Service Booths, IVR, web and social media customer services.

=== Next generation mobile services (NGMS) ===
Telenor is the first to officially launch 4.5G (LTE Advanced) in Pakistan. It has done so by aggregating two 4G bands, FDD-LTE Band 5 (850 MHz) with 10 MHz bandwidth and FDD-LTE Band 3 (1800 MHz) with 5 MHz / 10 MHz bandwidths, a portion of which has been re-farmed for 4G, it was previously used on the 2G (GPRS/EDGE) network. Telenor's LTE-A network was initially available in all major cities of Pakistan.

==== VoLTE ====
After conducting trials and internal testing, Telenor Pakistan launched Voice over LTE (VoLTE) on 29 January 2019. This makes it the first network in Pakistan to launch VoLTE. Telenor's VoLTE in Pakistan is based on an open source platform and has been developed in-house. Initially, support for other smartphone OEMs was not enabled despite claims of it being supported. Recently, Telenor's VoLTE services were enabled for select smartphone models, such as Oppo and Realme.

=== 5G Trials ===
On 13 March 2020, Telenor successfully conducted 5G trials, achieving connectivity speeds in excess of 1.5 Gbit/s. This also marked 15 years of its operation in Pakistan.

== Easypaisa ==
In 2008, Telenor acquired majority shares of Tameer Microfinance Bank Limited for its mobile financial services project. They named the branchless banking service "Easypaisa" and launched it in October 2009. Easypaisa was Pakistan's first branchless banking deployment. Later 'Mobile Wallet' was introduced where normal Telenor Pakistan subscribers could open a mobile account and make transactions themselves using their cellphones. Easypaisa was cited by CNN as the "model to follow" in launching mobile banking services.

Easypaisa is Pakistan's first and largest mobile money service and third largest in the world (according to CGAP), catering to over 18 million customers. It currently has over 75,000 agents across Pakistan. In October 2014 Telenor Easypaisa introduced several types of accounts at different levels.

Tameer Bank was acquired by Telenor Group in 2016 to become Telenor Microfinance Bank and Easypaisa became a part of the bank. ANT Financial Group which owns the global payment platform Alipay, acquired 45% stake in Telenor Bank for $184.5m in March 2018.

== See also ==
- List of telecommunication companies in Pakistan
