= Ufone =

Pakistani cellular service provider

- Native name: یوفون
- Type: Subsidiary
- Industry: Telecommunication
- Founded: 18 July 1998; 28 years ago
- Headquarters: 345 Building, Gulberg Greens, Islamabad, Islamabad
- Key people: Hatem Bamatraf (CEO)
- Products: ONIC, UPaisa
- Revenue: ▲ Rs. 75.423 billion (US$270 million) (2023)
- Operating income: ▼ Rs. -34.668 billion (US$−120 million) (2023)
- Net income: ▼ Rs. -24.614 billion (US$−88 million) (2023)
- Total assets: ▲ Rs. 234.087 billion (US$840 million) (2023)
- Total equity: ▲ Rs. 7.223 billion (US$26 million) (2023)
- Parent: Pakistan Telecommunication Company Ltd
- Website: ufone.com
- Footnotes; Financials as of 31 December 2023

Pak Telecommunication Mobile Limited, doing business as Ufone, is a Pakistani mobile network operator headquartered in Islamabad. It is a wholly owned subsidiary of Pakistan Telecommunication Company Limited (PTCL). Following PTCL's privatisation, Ufone became a part of Etisalat in 2006.

After the acquisition of Telenor Pakistan, Ufone (PTML) will operate as a separate entity from PTCL with its own board and CEO.

Ufone has a subscriber base of 76 million as of September 2026, among which 52 million are 4G/LTE subscribers. It has a market share of 36%.

== History ==
Ufone was founded in July 1998 and began operations in January 2001.

Rashid Khan was appointed acting CEO of Ufone in August 2017. Rashid Khan, president and CEO of both Ufone and PTCL, died in December 2020.

By 2017, Ufone was the only company in the Pakistani telecommunications market that did not have 4G data services. It launched 4G in August 2019. In 2019, PTCL and Ufone were merging a number of their departments.

In 2021, it purchased its own 4G spectrum license for US$279 million.

== Radio frequency summary ==
Spectrum Holding (post-merger with Telenor Pakistan)
Frequency	Band	Channel Width
850 MHz	5	10 MHz
900 MHz	8	12.4 MHz
1800 MHz	3	23.8 MHz
2100 MHz	1	10 MHz
2500 MHz	n41	60 MHz
3500 MHz	n78	120 MHz

Ufone had bid on a 5 MHz block of 2100 MHz spectrum in the NGMS auction held in early 2014, however due to rising demand, in December 2016, Ufone decided to re-farm a portion of its 900 MHz 2G network to 3G (HSPA+) to increase network capacity.

Ufone has re-farmed their 900 MHz spectrum in Karachi, Lahore, Rawalpindi/Islamabad, Abbottabad, Sheikhupura and Sialkot.

=== Post-merger spectrum allocation ===
PTA granted technical approval for merging and integration of networks on 19 March 2026, allowing Ufone to begin utilizing spectrum that is currently in-use by Telenor Pakistan.

=== 4G launch ===
On 9 February 2019, Ufone launched its 4G network in the twin cities of Islamabad and Rawalpindi, utilizing its existing NGMS licenses. By 2019, Ufone had expanded its 4G coverage to 16 cities, and had outlined plans to launch 4G in additional locations as well.

PTML Ufone won 2x9 MHz of 1800 MHz in the 2021 NGMS auction held by PTA, bringing its total spectrum in the band up to 15 MHz which will be used for improvement of its existing 4G services.

=== 3G sunset ===
Ufone began sunsetting its 3G services in June 2025, refarming the allocated spectrum to 4G. As of February 2026, it had sunset its 3G services in most urban centers of Pakistan.

=== 5G launch ===
Ufone participated in the 2026 NGMS Auction, acquiring 180 MHz of total spectrum, consisting of 120 MHz in the 3.5 GHz band and 60 MHz in the 2.6 GHz band.

==== Voice over LTE (VoLTE) ====
In October 2023, Ufone announced that it enabled VoLTE across its network, making it the last network in the country to support the service.

== Merger with Telenor Pakistan ==
In December 2025, PTCL completed its acquisition of Telenor Pakistan, along with its spectrum allocation licenses and cellular network.

On 19 March 2026, the Pakistan Telecommunication Authority gave their technical approval for the merger between Ufone and Telenor Pakistan allowing both companies to begin integration of systems and spectrum.

On 1 July 2026, the Islamabad High Court approved the merger between Telenor Pakistan and Pak Telecommunication Mobile Limited (Ufone).

As part of the integration between both networks, Ufone has migrated to the Telenor '345' headquarters building in Gulberg Greens, Islamabad. Hatem Bamatraf, who previously served as the Group CEO for both PTCL and Ufone will now lead the MergeCo as the new CEO. PTCL will operate as a separate entity with its own board and CEO.

== See also ==
- List of telecommunication companies in Pakistan
