= Jazz (mobile network operator) =

Pakistani telecommunications company

Pakistan Mobile Communications Limited (PMCL)
- دنیا کو بتا دو (lit. "tell the world")

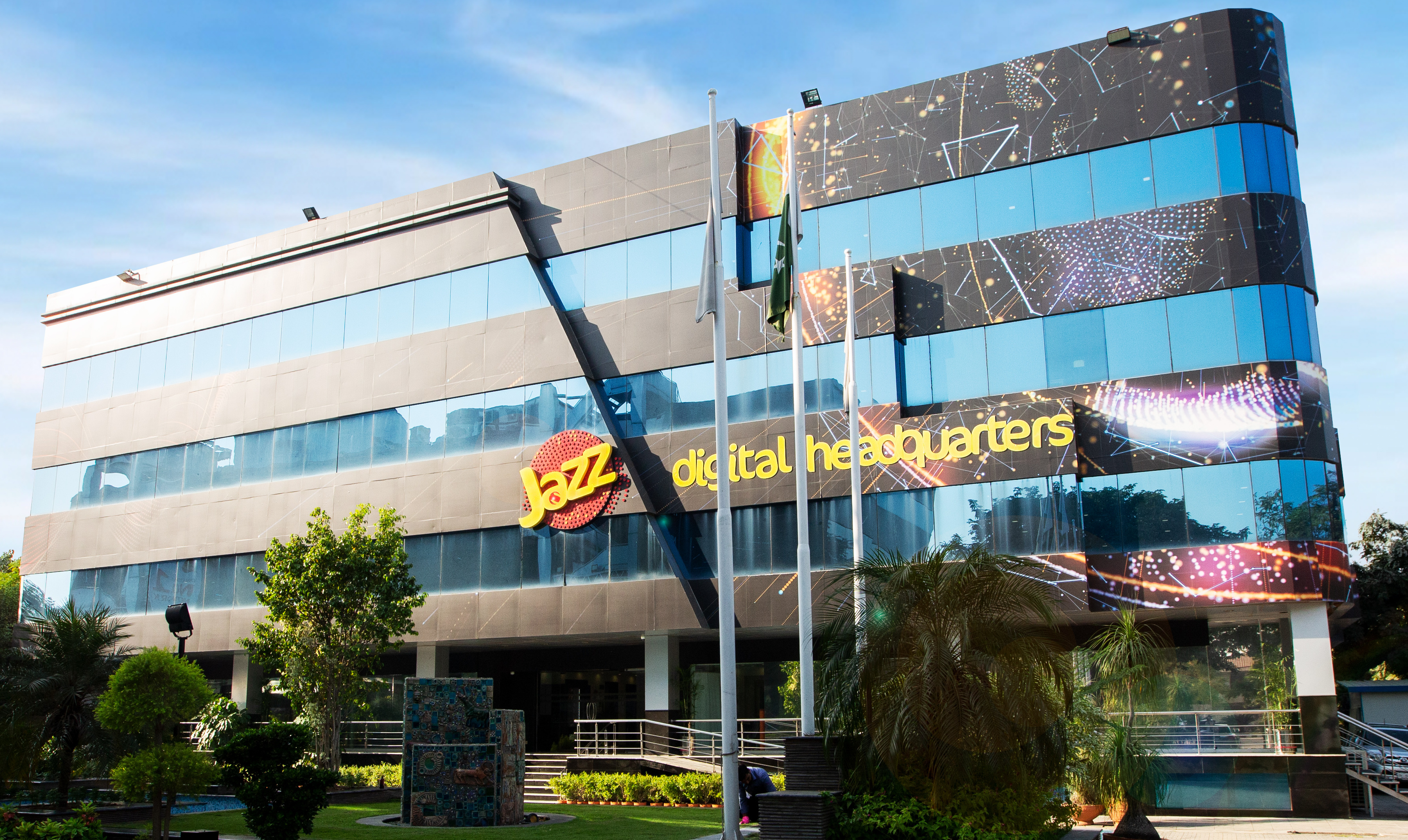
- Jazz Headquarters in Islamabad, Pakistan
- Trade name: Jazz
- Native name: جاز
- Formerly: Mobilink
- Type: Unlisted public company
- Industry: Telephony and Internet
- Founded: June 1994; 32 years ago as a joint venture between Saif Group and Motorola Inc.
- Headquarters: Islamabad, Pakistan
- Area served: Pakistan
- Key people: Aamir Hafeez Ibrahim (CEO)
- Products: Mobile telephony Mobile banking
- Revenue: ▲ Rs. 356.77 billion (US$1.3 billion) (2025)
- Operating income: ▲ Rs. 34.74 billion (US$120 million) (2025)
- Net income: ▼ Rs. -11.566 billion (US$−41 million) (2025)
- Total assets: ▲ Rs. 820.13 billion (US$2.9 billion) (2025)
- Total equity: ▼ Rs. 114.66 billion (US$410 million) (2025)
- Parent: VEON
- Subsidiaries: JazzCash
- Website: jazz.com.pk
- Footnotes; Financials as of 31 December 2025

Pakistan Mobile Communications Limited (PMCL), doing business as Jazz, is a Pakistani mobile network operator headquartered in Islamabad.

It is currently led by chief executive officer (CEO) Aamir Hafeez Ibrahim.

As of October 2026, Jazz has 77 million subscribers in Pakistan, among which 59 million are 4G subscribers. It has the highest market share of all mobile network operators at 36%. In March 2026, Jazz launched 5G services across approximately 180 sites, including Islamabad, all provincial capitals and several major metropolitan areas.

== History ==
Jazz was founded as Mobilink in 1994 in a joint venture between Saif Group and Motorola Inc. In February 2001, Egypt based Orascom Investment Holding bought Motorola's shares in Jazz to become the majority shareholder with 69% control. Then, in June 2007, Orascom further purchased the remaining shares under Saif Group's control to become Jazz's 100% owner.

In 2010, Dutch operator VEON agreed to acquire most of the telecom assets of Orascom, including Jazz, in a $6.5 billion deal, creating the world's fifth-largest mobile network operator by subscriber base. In November 2015, VEON announced the acquisition of Warid Pakistan, a subsidiary of Abu Dhabi Group. Completed in July 2016 after due approvals, the first-ever local telecom company acquisition created a combined subscriber base of 50 million. Following the merger of Mobilink and Warid Pakistan, Mobilink was officially rebranded to Jazz in 2017.

In March 2021, VEON's ownership rose to 100% after acquiring 15% of the shares held by Abu Dhabi Group for US$273 million.

== Network ==
Jazz has over 16,000 active cell sites in the country, with over 25,000 kilometers of fiber-optic cables laid. Huawei, Nokia-Siemens, and ZTE are the primary vendors for networking equipment at Jazz, including Radio Base Stations, microwave equipment and network switches.

In 2014, Jazz participated in the 2014 NGMS auction held by PTA, which allowed them to bid for a 3G license, and a 10 MHz block in the 2100 MHz band was allocated to Jazz.

In March 2017, Jazz inaugurated their Network Operations Center (NOC) which makes use of IBM and Dell EMC products to manage day-to-day network operations and provides the company with 24x7 network surveillance.

=== Radio frequency summary ===
| Frequency | Protocol | Band | Class | Channel Width |
|---|---|---|---|---|
| 900 MHz | GSM/GPRS/EDGE | 8 | 2G | 7.4 MHz |
| 900 MHz | LTE/LTE-A | 8 | 4G/4G+ | 5 MHz |
| 1800 MHz | LTE/LTE-A | 3 | 4G/4G+ | 20 MHz |
| 2100 MHz | LTE/LTE-A | 1 | 4G/4G+ | 10 MHz |
| 2500 MHz | LTE/LTE-A | 41 | 4G/4G+ | 20 MHz |
| 700 MHz | 5G NR | n28 | 5G | 20 MHz |
| 2300 MHz | 5G NR | n40 | 5G | 50 MHz |
| 2500 MHz | 5G NR | n41 | 5G | 50 MHz |
| 3500 MHz | 5G NR | n78 | 5G | 50 MHz |

Jazz's participation in the 2014 NGMS Auction held by PTA allowed them to bid for the 3G license, which included a 10 MHz block in the 2100 MHz band. In July 2014, they announced that they have over 10,000 3G and 9,000 4G ready cell sites. Jazz did not bid for any 4G spectrum in the 2014 NGMS auction.

Post-merger with Warid, Jazz was able to use Warid's license allowing them to become a 4G network using a 5 MHz block in the 1800 MHz band. In May 2017, Jazz won the 2017 NGMS auction held by PTA. This includes a 10 MHz block in the 1800 MHz (FDD-LTE Band 3) frequency to be used for Jazz 4G. Jazz was also awarded additional 4G spectrum on 30 June 2017 by PTA.

==== 4G+ / LTE-A launch ====
Jazz has refarmed a 10 MHz block from its 900 MHz spectrum for carrier aggregation with their existing 1800 MHz 4G spectrum. The LTE-A network would be rolled out to cater for growing demand. This makes them the third carrier after Telenor Pakistan and Zong 4G to officially launch LTE-A in the country.

In July 2021, Jazz upgraded its existing LTE network to LTE-A Pro, with the introduction of 256-QAM and Massive MIMO.

==== 5G launch ====
Jazz acquired 190 MHz of spectrum in the 2026 NGMS Auction, consisting of 20 MHz in the 700 MHz band, 50 MHz in the 2.3 GHz band, 70 MHz in the 2.6 GHz band and 50 MHz in the 3.5 GHz band.

=== Voice over LTE (VoLTE) ===
Jazz tested VoLTE in May 2017 with its partners Huawei and Nokia, announced in a press statement.

Jazz rolled out VoLTE across its network in February 2022, with supported devices including Apple, Samsung, Huawei, Oppo, Vivo, Itel, Xiaomi, Realme, Infinix and Jazz Digit branded feature phones.

=== WiFi Calling (VoWiFi) ===
Jazz rolled out Voice over WiFi (VoWiFi) capabilities branded 'JazzFi' in July 2023.

=== 5G Trials ===
In January 2020, Jazz had reported that they had successfully carried out 5G trials with reaching speeds of 1.5 Gbit/s. These trials were carried out on the 2.6 GHz spectrum.

=== 3G Shutdown ===
Jazz announced that it would shut down its 3G network nationwide by November 2024 to repurpose the spectrum for expansion of its 4G network. Their 3G network was shut off nationwide on 18 November 2024.

== Subsidiaries ==
=== JazzCash ===
Jazz had partnered with Mobilink Microfinance Banking to make an entry into the banking market, initially launched under the MobiCash brand name, it was later changed to JazzCash. It is a direct competitor to Telenor Pakistan's Easypaisa.
