= Zong (mobile network) =

Pakistani mobile network operator

CMPak Limited
- New logo after 5G rebranding

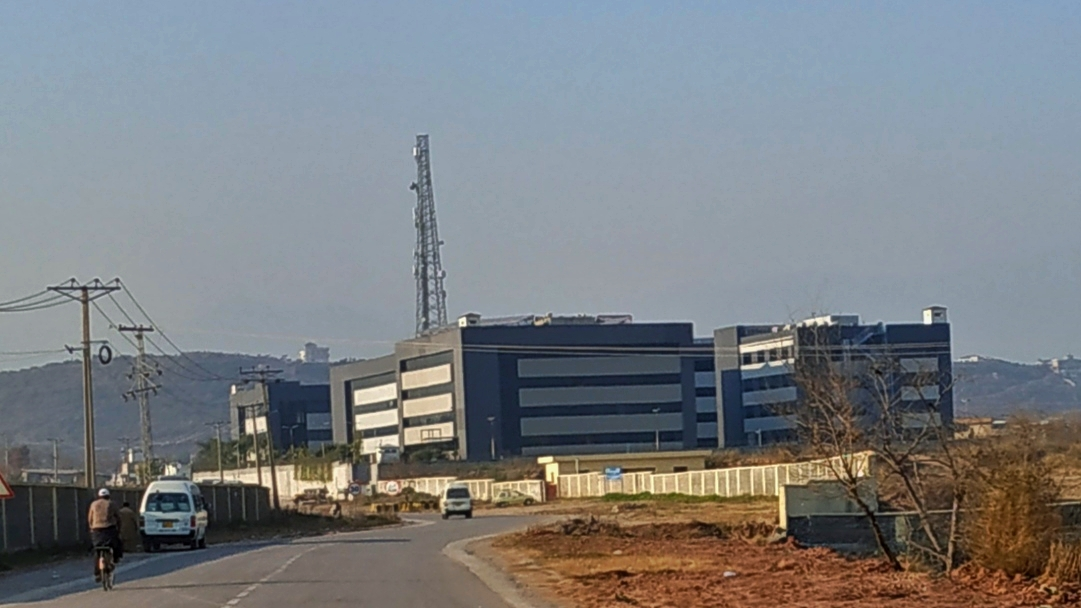
- Zong Headquarters in Islamabad, Pakistan
- Trade name: Zong; China Mobile Pakistan
- Native name: سی ایم پاک محدود
- Formerly: Paktel (1991–2008)
- Type: Subsidiary
- Industry: Telecommunication
- Founded: April 2008; 18 years ago
- Headquarters: Islamabad, Pakistan
- Area served: Pakistan
- Key people: Huo Junli (CEO)
- Products: Mobile services Data services Mobile banking Telephony
- Parent: China Mobile
- Website: www.zong.com.pk

CMPak Limited, doing business as Zong (Urdu: زونگ), is a Pakistani mobile network operator. The company is a wholly owned subsidiary of China Mobile, marking the parent company's first overseas expansion following its 2008 acquisition of a GSM network license from Millicom. Zong is Pakistan's second-largest mobile service provider, with a subscriber base of 56 million, including 45 million 4G/LTE subscribers. As of 2024, it has over 15,000 4G-enabled sites across Pakistan, and a 26% market share among the country's cellular operators.

== History ==
Zong began operations in 1991 as Paktel, established by Cable & Wireless. It was the first company granted a license to operate cellular phone services in Pakistan. The company offered Advanced Mobile Phone System (AMPS) services until 2004, when it launched Global System for Mobile Communications (GSM) services.

In 2003, Millicom Corporation, then the majority owner of Instaphone, acquired Paktel from Cable & Wireless.

On 22 January 2007, Millicom International Cellular S.A. announced the sale of its 88.86 percent stake in Paktel Limited to China Mobile for $284 million, a sum that included the repayment of intercompany debt. Millicom stated in a press release that the sale implied an enterprise value of $460 million for Paktel.

On 4 May 2007, Paktel Limited was renamed China Mobile Pakistan. On 16 May 2007, China Mobile announced that it had increased its stake in the company to 100%. On 1 April 2008, Paktel was rebranded as Zong.

== Network ==
Between 2008 and 2014, China Mobile Pakistan invested more than US$2 billion toward network infrastructure in Pakistan.

Zong has built the second-largest cellular network in the country with over 17,000 base stations. To go green, Zong has installed solar powered cell sites in various locations. It has the country's largest solar power telecommunication network.

Zong 4G (logo till 2026)

Its network base stations, microwave links, IT support and transmission towers are maintained and provided by ZTE Pakistan.

=== Radio frequency summary ===
Frequency	Protocol	Band	Class	Channel Width
900 MHz	GSM/GPRS/EDGE	8	2G	2.6 MHz
1800 MHz	GSM/GPRS/EDGE	3	2G	1 MHz
2100 MHz	UMTS/HSPA+/DC-HSPA+	1	3G	5 MHz / 10 MHz
900 MHz	LTE/LTE-A	8	4G/4G+	5 MHz
1800 MHz	LTE/LTE-A/5G NR	3	4G/4G+	15 MHz / 20 MHz
2100 MHz	LTE/LTE-A/5G NR	1	4G/4G+	5 MHz / 10 MHz
2500 MHz	5G NR	n41	5G	60 MHz
3500 MHz	5G NR	n78	5G	50 MHz

=== Next generation mobile services ===
On 23 April 2014, Pakistan concluded the auction for the next generation of mobile spectrum. Zong paid $516 million for a 10 MHz spectrum in the 2.1 GHz frequency range for 3G and a 10 MHz spectrum in the 1.8 GHz frequency range for 4G, making it Pakistan's first 3G and 4G operator.

=== LTE Advanced (4G+) ===
Zong has refarmed 5 MHz of its 2100 MHz 3G spectrum for 4G. They are currently deploying (via carrier aggregation) 15 MHz of Band 3 (1800 MHz), and 10 MHz of Band 1 (2100 MHz) for LTE-A.

=== 5G Testing ===
As of August 2019, Zong is the first of three mobile network operators in Pakistan to successfully conduct 5G trials. In the trial, speeds of up to 1.14 GB/s were achieved.

=== 5G launch ===
In preparation for the launch of 5G, Zong acquired 110 MHz of spectrum in the 2026 NGMS/5G Auction including 60 MHz in the 2.6 GHz band and 50 MHz in the 3.5 GHz band.

=== Number scheming ===
Zong uses the following numbering scheme:

+92 3 1 N_{1}N_{2}N_{3}N_{4}N_{5}N_{6}N_{7}N_{8}N_{9}

+92 3 7 N_{1}N_{2}N_{3}N_{4}N_{5}N_{6}N_{7}N_{8}N_{9}

Where, 92 is the ISD code for Pakistan and is required when dialing outside the country, 3 is the mobile access code, and 1 or 7 are the prefixes for Zong allocated by Pakistan Telecommunication Authority. Omitting +92 would require 0 instead to represent local call, hence 031/037 are the general prefix and N_{1}N_{2}N_{3}N_{4}N_{5}N_{6}N_{7}N_{8}N_{9} is the subscriber number.

=== Zong Fiber-to-the-Home (FTTH) ===
Zong plans to launch Fiber-to-the home (FTTH) Broadband internet. Initially the service will only be available in select areas of Karachi.

== Marketing ==
=== Stores ===
Zong operates 22 customer service centres, 305 franchises, and 190,000 retail customer points nationwide.

=== Slogans ===
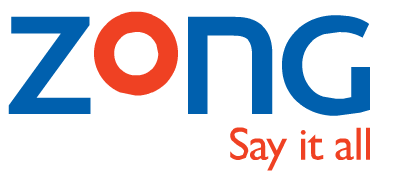
Previous logo of Zong with slogan

At the time of its launch in 2008, China Mobile Pakistan ran the advertising campaign for Zong with the tagline 'Say it all' (Urdu: سب کہہ دو). China Mobile Pakistan ran advertising for Zong with new tagline 'A New Dream' (Urdu: ایک نیا خواب). In February 2022, the company announced its new tagline is "Let's Get Digital".

=== Products ===
Zong offers prepaid, postpaid, ladies, and youth plans. The postpaid, ladies, and youth plans are branded as bizXcess, Flutter, and Circle. Moreover, it also offers data plans and branch-less banking.

== Mobile banking ==
=== Timepey ===
Timepey was the mobile banking service offered by Zong in association with Askari Bank Limited from late 2012. Timepey lets users pay utility bills, transfer money to specified recipients anywhere in the country, deposit and withdraw cash and carry out account transfers.

=== PayMax ===
Discontinuing Timepey in 2017, Zong relaunched its mobile financial services with a new brand "PayMax" in association with Askari Bank Limited. PayMax lets users pay utility bills, transfer money to specified recipients anywhere in the country, deposit and withdraw cash and carry out account transfers.

== See also ==
- List of telecommunication companies in Pakistan
