= Pakistan Telecommunication Authority =

Telecom regulator

- Pakistan Telecommunication Authority
- مقتدرہِ ٹیلی مواصلات پاکستان
- Abbreviation: PTA
- Established: 1996; 30 years ago
- Headquarters: Islamabad
- Region served: Pakistan
- Chairman: Major General (R) Hafeez ur Rehman
- Key people: Chairman, Member Finance, Member Compliance and Enforcement
- Parent organization: Government of Pakistan
- Website: www.pta.gov.pk

The Pakistan Telecommunication Authority (PTA) (Urdu: مقتدرہِ ٹیلی مواصلات پاکستان) is the telecommunication regulator of Pakistan, responsible for the establishment, operation and maintenance of telecommunication systems and the provision of telecommunication services in Pakistan. Headquartered in Islamabad, PTA also has zonal offices located in Karachi, Lahore, Faisalabad, Gwadar, Abbottabad, Sukkur, Peshawar, Quetta, Muzaffarabad, Rawalpindi, Multan and Gilgit.

== History ==
The Pakistan Telecommunication Ordinance 1994, established the primary regulatory framework for the telecommunication industry including the establishment of an authority. Thereafter, Telecommunication (Re-Organization) Act no XVII was promulgated in 1996 that aimed to reorganize the telecom sector of Pakistan. Under Telecom Reorganization Act 1996, Pakistan Telecommunication Authority (PTA) was established in 1996 to regulate the establishment, operation and maintenance of telecommunication systems and the provision of telecom services.

== Functions ==
To regulate the establishment, operation and maintenance of telecommunication systems and provision of telecommunication services in Pakistan. To receive and expeditiously dispose of applications for the use of radio-frequency spectrum. To promote and protect the interests of users of telecommunication services in Pakistan. To promote the availability of a wide range of high quality, efficient, cost effective and competitive telecommunication services throughout Pakistan. To promote rapid modernization of telecommunication systems and telecommunication services. To investigate and adjudicate on complaints and other claims made against licensees arising out of alleged contraventions of the provisions of this Act, the rules made and licenses issued there under and take action accordingly. which led the government to publish a tax on the electronic device attached by the telecommunication service brought from overseas to Pakistan. To make recommendations to the Federal Government on policies with respect to international telecommunications, provision of support for participation in international meetings and agreements to be executed in relation to the routing of international traffic and accounting settlements.

== Responsibilities ==
In exercising its functions and powers under the Act, the authority ensures:

- Rights of licensees are duly protected.
- All of its decisions and determinations are made promptly, in an open equitable, non discriminatory, consistent and transparent manner.
- All applications made to it are disposed of expeditiously;
- The persons affected by its decisions or determination are given a due notice thereof and provided with an opportunity of being heard.
- It encourages, except subject to the exclusive right of the company in basic telephone service, fair competition in the telecommunication sector.
- The interest of users of telecommunication services are duly safeguarded and protected.
- Preventing unlawful online content.

== Leadership ==
The Authority consists of a chairperson, member (finance) and member (compliance & enforcement).

Chairman PTA is Major General (R) Hafeezur Rehman. Previously it was vacant as Major General (R) Amir Azeem Bajwa HI(M) relinquished the charge after completion of tenure. Muhammad Naveed is Member (Finance) and Dr. Khawar Siddique Khokhar is Member (Compliance & Enforcement).

Ex-Chairmen Pakistan Telecommunication Authority

No.	Name	Office Held	Retired	Notes (if any)
1.	Mian Muhammad Javed	8th May 1995	26th December 2000	
2.	Khalid Bashir	28th December 2000	1st November 2001	Major General (Pak-Army)
3.	Shahzada Alam Malik	15th January 2002	23rd July 2008	Major General (Pak-Army)
4.	Mohammed Yaseen	24th July 2008	23rd July 2012	Doctor (PhD)
5.	Farooq Ahmed Awan	31st July 2012	15th January 2013	
6.	Syed Ismail Shah	30th September 2013	11th November 2017	Doctor (PhD)
7.	Muhammad Naveed	9th April 2018	21st January 2019	
8.	Amir Azeem Bajwa	22nd January 2019	3rd January 2023	Major General (Pak-Army)

== Licensing ==
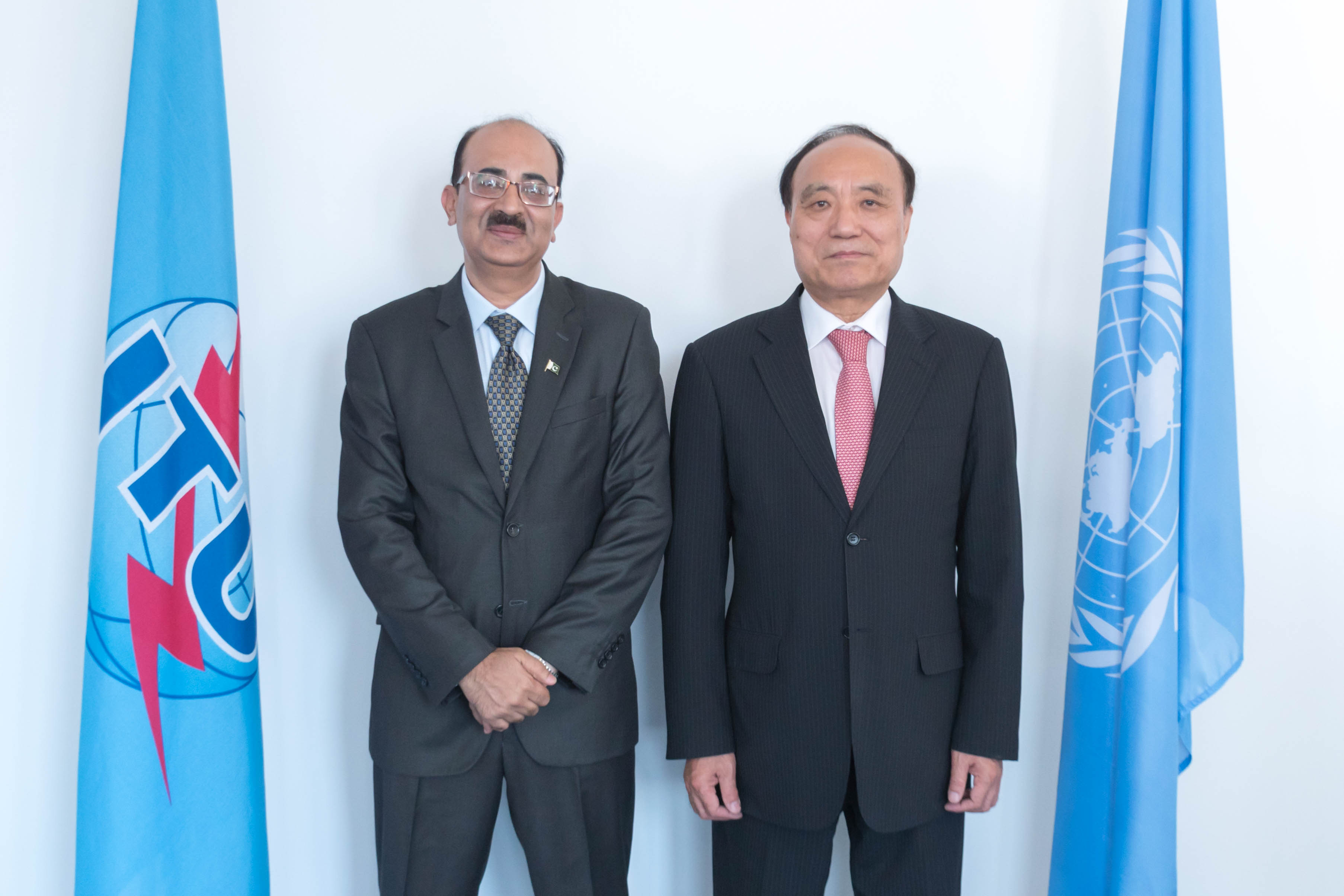
Acting Chairman Muhammad Naveed with Houlin Zhao in 2018

=== NGMS Spectrum Auction 2004 ===
PTA conducted first spectrum auction in 2004, in which a total of 13.6 MHz spectrum in 900 and 1800 MHz was sold at US$582 Million. As a result of auction, Telenor and Warid Telecom entered Pakistan's telecom market.

=== NGMS Spectrum Auction 2014 ===
PTA auctioned spectrum for 3G and 4G services in 2014. One 4G license and three 3G licenses were finally auctioned on 23 April 2014. The 4G license was bagged by Zong (as well as 10 MHz 3G license), while the 3G licenses were auctioned to Telenor (5 MHz), Mobilink (10 MHz) and Ufone (5 MHz). While Warid Pakistan was the only operator in Pakistan not to bid on the auction; Later on, Warid started LTE services using a previously acquired technology neutral license. The auction raised a total of $1.22 billion including 10% advance tax for the government of Pakistan.

=== NGMS Spectrum Auction 2016 ===
Another auction was held in June for a 10 MHz block in the 850 MHz (Band 5) frequency, the base price was set at US$395 million. Telenor Pakistan was the only bidder in the auction and won the license for 850 MHz which it now uses for 3G (HSPA+) and LTE.

=== NGMS Spectrum Auction 2017 ===
PTA plans to hold another auction on 16 May 2017 to auction a 10 MHz block in the 1800 MHz (Band 3) frequency, which was un-sold in the 2014 NGMS auction.

The base price will be set at US$295 million.

It was first mentioned that Ufone could've been the only operator to participate in the 2017 NGMS auction, however as of 24 April 2017, PTA officials had revealed that all telecom operators have shown great interest in the available spectrum and the auction has been delayed to 24 May 2017 on the request of all telecom operators.

Contrary to earlier rumours and statements, the only operator to bid for the 1800 MHz 4G spectrum in the 2017 auction would be Jazz, the other operators, Telenor, Zong and Ufone did not submit any applications and a statement from PTA mentioned that Jazz was the only operator to submit the application before the deadline which was 17 May 2017.

On 18 May 2017, Jazz became the winner of the 4G spectrum auction. It will be officially awarded the spectrum after the fee is paid.

=== NGMS Spectrum Auction 2021 ===
PTA held a spectrum auction in September 2021, for both 1800 MHz (Band 3) and 2100 MHz (Band 1). Only one network operator participated in the auction, Ufone (PTML) submitted a bid for 2x9 MHz in the 1800 MHz band which it won for US$279 million.

=== NGMS Spectrum Auction 2021 (AJK & GB) ===
A separate spectrum auction was held by PTA specifically for the Azad Jammu & Kashmir and Gilgit Baltistan regions for both 1800 MHz and 2100 MHz bands. Both Zong CMPak and Jazz (PMCL) participated in the auction for 2x10 MHz of 1800 MHz, however after 18 rounds, Zong was declared as the winner of the 10 MHz block. Telenor, Ufone and Zong also won an additional 1.2 MHz in the same band.

PTA stated that none of the operators except Telenor Pakistan decided to participate in the auction for 2100 MHz, so Telenor was awarded 2x15 MHz in the 2100 MHz band at the base price.

=== NGMS/5G Spectrum Auction 2026 ===
A spectrum auction for the launch of 5G was held on 10 March 2026 for 700, 1800, 2100, 2300, 2600 and 3500 MHz bands. The total spectrum offered in the auction was 597.2 MHz, making it the largest spectrum auction ever in the history of Pakistan.

Total Spectrum Offering in 2026 NGMS Auction
Frequency	700 MHz	1800 MHz	2100 MHz	2300 MHz	2500 MHz	3500 MHz
Bandwidth	30 MHz	7.2 MHz	40 MHz	50 MHz	190 MHz	280 MHz

All three telecom operators participated in the auction, with 480 MHz of spectrum being sold, raising over US$ 500 million.

Final Results of 2026 NGMS Auction
Frequency	Jazz	Ufone	Zong
700 MHz	20 MHz	No bids	
1800 MHz	No bids		
2100 MHz	No bids		
2300 MHz	50 MHz	No bids	
2500 MHz	70 MHz	60 MHz	60 MHz
3500 MHz	50 MHz	120 MHz	50 MHz

Jazz was the only bidder for the 700 MHz and 2300 MHz bands. None of the operators placed any bids for the spectrum offered in the 1800 MHz and 2100 MHz bands.

PTA officially awarded the spectrum licenses to all participating operators on 19 March 2026, allowing the roll-out of 5G services to the general public.

== Censorship and blocked content ==
=== Censorship and surveillance ===
PTA has allegedly played a central role in internet censorship and mass surveillance in Pakistan. It has directed telecom providers to implement systems like the Lawful Intercept Management System (LIMS), enabling monitoring of millions of mobile phones, with providers reportedly required to allow surveillance of up to two per cent of their user base. PTA has also overseen the deployment of the Web Monitoring System (WMS), an internet traffic inspection tool capable of blocking millions of active sessions, which replaced an earlier system installed in 2018. This infrastructure, involving companies such as Geedge Networks, Niagara Networks, Thales, and New H3C Technologies, is reported to resemble China’s “Great Firewall.” Since the Prevention of Electronic Crimes Act (PECA) was passed in 2016, PTA has allegedly blocked over 1.4 million URLs, often without notifying users, and has regularly authorized internet shutdowns and bandwidth throttling, especially during politically sensitive periods. PTA’s role reportedly includes managing surveillance data through systems like the Monitoring Centre Next Generation (McNG), raising concerns about transparency, privacy, and freedom of expression. Further expansion of surveillance powers is anticipated with the enactment of the Digital Nation Pakistan Act 2025.

=== Blocked content ===
==== PUBG Controversy ====
In July 2020, PTA banned the online game PlayerUnknown's Battlegrounds as some clerics state the marriage contract of those playing is voided. Millions of Social media users of Pakistan have flooded sites like Facebook, Twitter and have shown overwhelming support for PUBG (PlayerUnknown's Battlegrounds). In response, PTA lifted ban on the popular online game.

==== TikTok ====
In October 2020, PTA blocked TikTok for failing to filter out "immoral and indecent" content. Soon after, TikTok made an agreement to moderate the content available in Pakistan and the ban was lifted.

In March 2021, PTA said that a court ordered to block TikTok due to complaints from "indecent" content.

==== Wikipedia ====
The Pakistan Telecommunication Authority banned Wikipedia in the country due to "sacrilegious content" in February 2023. Several days later, Prime Minister Shehbaz Sharif ordered the immediate restoration of access to the online encyclopaedia website, and established two cabinet committees to review the PTA's action and suggest alternative measures for removing or blocking access to objectionable content on Wikipedia and other online information sites.
