= LEAP Tech Event =

Tech conference

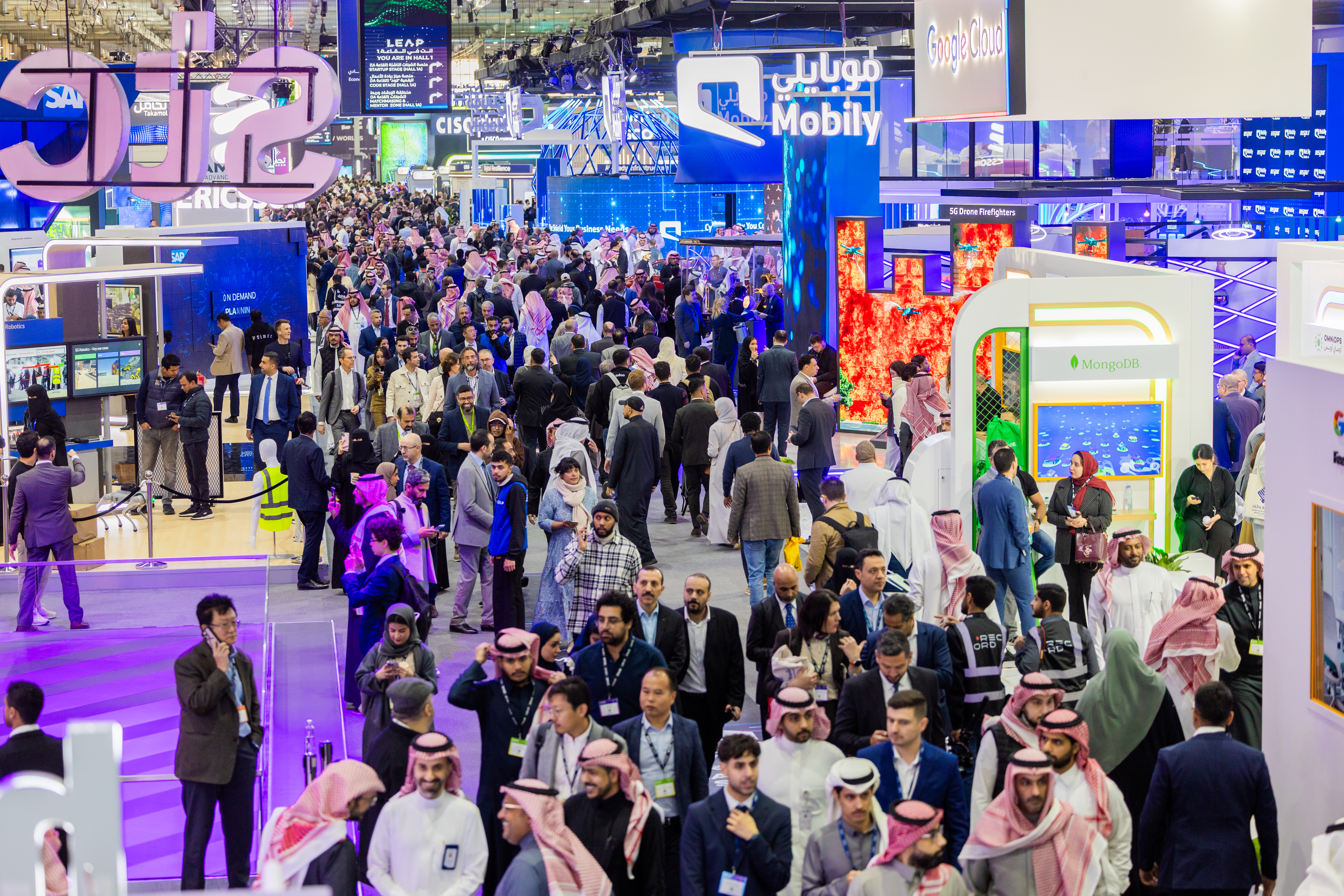
- 2025 LEAP Tech Event
- Status: Active
- Genre: Technology
- Venue: Malham, Riyadh, Saudi Arabia
- Location: Riyadh
- Coordinates: 25°15′5.8″N 46°23′12.98″E
- Country: Saudi Arabia
- Inaugurated: 1–3 February 2022
- Founders: MCIT, SAFCSP, Tahaluf
- Most recent: 31 August–3 September 2026
- Attendance: 100,000+ (2022); 172,000+ (2023); 215,000+ (2024); 201,000+ (2025)
- Website: onegiantleap.com

LEAP is an annual tech event that was founded in 2022 by the Ministry of Communication and Information Technology (Saudi Arabia) (MCIT), the Saudi Federation for Cybersecurity, Programming and Drones (SAFCSP) and Tahaluf, an Informa company. The event is hosted in Riyadh, Saudi Arabia.

The conference's topics include Fintech, Edutech, Smart Cities, Health technology, Creative Economy, Future Energy, Gaming, Space, Sports Tech, Retail and Artificial Intelligence (AI).

DeepFest, the region's AI event is co-located with LEAP as it's LEAP's dedicated AI stream. DeepFest is powered by Saudi Authority for Data and Artificial Intelligence (SDAIA) and organised by Tahaluf.

== History ==
LEAP was co-founded in 2022 through a collaboration between Mike Champion and Annabelle Mander of Tahaluf, the Saudi Federation for Cybersecurity, Programming and Drones (SAFCSP), and the Ministry of Communications and Information Technology (MCIT). The inaugural edition took place in Riyadh from 1–3 February 2022 and was described as one of the largest debut technology events to be held globally, attracting more than 100,000 attendees from the international tech community, including industry leaders, investors and hundreds of exhibitors.

Over 700 tech companies, 330 investors, and 500 CEOs and tech experts participated in LEAP 2022. The event tallied to over $6.4 billion worth of initiatives and programmes.

The event also held the inaugural Rocket Fuel Pitch Competition, where a total of one million USD was awarded to promising start-ups. It also built the world's largest kaleidoscope, measuring 40 metres in length.

LEAP 2023, the second edition of the annual tech event took place in Riyadh, Saudi Arabia from 6–9 February 2023. Over the four days, LEAP hosted more than 172,000 visitors, 900 exhibitors, 700 speakers who spoke on 11 stages from 50 countries, 500 start-ups, and 1026 investors with a combined AUM of 2 trillion.

At LEAP 2023, six start-ups won a share of a one-million-dollar prize fund through the Rocket Fuel Pitch Competition. Notable companies participating in the event included Hiroshi Ishiguro, Magic Keys, bHaptics and Mirror.

LEAP 2024, the third edition of the annual tech event took place in Malham, Riyadh, Saudi Arabia from 4–7 March 2024. Over the four days, LEAP hosted more than 215,000 visitors, 1,800 exhibitors, 1,100 speakers who spoke on 10 stages and 19 tracks, more than 600 start-ups, 1,600 investors with a combined AUM of $4.89 trillion, and between $11.9 billion and $13.4 billion announced as an investment.

At LEAP 2024, six start-ups won a share of a $1 million prize fund at the third Rocket Fuel, the start-up pitch competition. Some of the notable companies in attendance included AbuErdan, One Verse, Ubilite, NewTrace, Next Generation, Hyperlume and Lisan AI.

LEAP 2025, the fourth edition of the annual tech event, took place in Malham, Riyadh, Saudi Arabia from 9–12 February 2025. The event hosted more than 201,000 visitors over the four days.

More than 1,800 exhibitors, 1,000 speakers and 600 start-ups participated in LEAP 2025. The event welcomed over 1,900 investors with a combined AUM of over $22 trillion, and the conference programme expanded to 14 stages and 20 content tracks. The Tech Arena was hosted by BBC Click presenters Spencer Kelly and Lara Lewington, and featured demonstrations from global technology innovators including Adobe, Boston Dynamics, Golden Gloves VR, L'Oréal and UBTech. The new Sports Tech Hub brought together sports organisations and athletes including Andrea Pirlo, Dominic Thiem, Francesco Totti, Mathieu Flamini and Patrice Evra.

At LEAP 2025, the Rocket Fuel Pitch Competition received applications from start-ups across multiple countries, with finalists competing for a $1 million equity-free prize pool across six award categories.

LEAP 2026 was held at the Riyadh Exhibition and Convention Centre in Malham from 31 August to 3 September 2026. The fifth edition featured sessions on artificial intelligence, advanced computing, mobility, gaming, sports technology and other emerging technologies across 16 stages and more than 20 content tracks.

== Speakers and partners ==
The speaking panel has included many top-level executives, government officials, sportspersons, and subject matter experts, including Abdulaziz bin Salman Al Saud, Börje Ekholm, Peggy Johnson, Stephane Houdet, Eugene Kaspersky, Michel Salgado, Christian Klein, Makaziwe Mandela, Maëlle Gavet, Susan Kilrain, Sian Proctor, Karren Brady, Steven Bartlett, Bill McDermott, Arvind Krishna, Heather Mohanan, Shou Zi Chew, Eric Yuan, Anne Neuberger, Mo Gawdat, Adam Selipsky, Sol Rashidi, Ciku Mugembi, Dr. Omar Hatamleh, Kwebbelkop, Thierry Henry, Will.i.am, Rick Fox, Ken Kutaragi, James Caan and Elizabeth Adams.

LEAP’s previous sponsors and partners have included venture capital firms, Fortune 500 companies, government agencies, educational institutions and start-ups including, Microsoft, Cisco, SAP SE, IBM, Zoom, Ericsson, Huawei, PWC, Aramco, Deloitte, Google, Google Cloud, Meta, Mobily, STC, Amazon Web Services, ServiceNow, Dell, Nokia, HP, TikTok and Cloudflare.

== See also ==
- Web Summit
- Consumer Electronics Show
- Slush
