= DeepFest =

Tech conference

- DeepFest 2025 Hall Entrance
- Status: Active
- Genre: AI and technology
- Venue: Malham, Riyadh, Saudi Arabia
- Location: Riyadh
- Coordinates: 25°15′5.8″N 46°23′12.98″E
- Country: Saudi Arabia
- Inaugurated: 6–9 February 2023
- Founders: Saudi Authority for Data and Artificial Intelligence (SDAIA), Tahaluf
- Most recent: 9–12 February 2025
- Attendance: 20,000+ (2023); 48,000+ (2024); 68,000+ (2025)
- Organiser: Tahaluf
- Website: deepfest.com

DeepFest is an annual AI event organised by Tahaluf and powered by the Saudi Authority for Data and Artificial Intelligence (SDAIA). The event was held for the first time and co-located with LEAP Tech Event in February 2023 in Riyadh, Saudi Arabia.

DeepFest features two stages, DeepFest and DeepMedia, which highlight AI developments in robotics, creative technologies, sustainability and security, as well as the growing integration of AI across media and technology sectors.

== History ==
DeepFest was first held within LEAP, the global technology event founded in Riyadh in 2022 through a collaboration between Tahaluf, the Saudi Federation for Cybersecurity, Programming and Drones (SAFCSP) and the Ministry of Communications and Information Technology (MCIT).

It continues to be held as a co-located event within LEAP each year, serving as the conference's artificial intelligence programme. The inaugural DeepFest took place in Riyadh from 6-9 February 2023, hosting more than 20,000 attendees over four days, with around 80 exhibitors and 50 speakers and AI experts participating.

DeepFest 2024, the second edition took place in Malham, Riyadh, Saudi Arabia from 4–7 March 2024. Over four days, DeepFest hosted more than 48,000 attendees, 150 speakers and 120 exhibitors.

DeepFest 2025, the third edition of the annual AI event, took place in Riyadh, Saudi Arabia from 9–12 February 2025. The event hosted over 68,000 attendees, more than 150 speakers and 120 exhibitors.

== Speakers and partners ==
The speaking panel has included global executives, government officials and AI experts including Angela Kane, Mo Gawdat, Lan Guan, Michael Kratsios, Omar Hatamleh, Aparna Bawa, Kwebbelkop, Sol Rashidi, Hiroshi Ishiguro, Cassie Kozyrkov, Greg Ombach, Mark Minevich, Marc Raibert, Michael Spranger, Daniela Braga, Aidan Gomez, Lambert Hogenhout and Anouk Wipprecht.

DeepFest's past sponsors and partners include SDAIA, Ministry of Media, SenseTime, Axellect, UiPath, Teradata, Beyond Limits, QSS Robotics, UBtech Robotics and PWC.

Google, Meta, IBM, TikTok, NASA, Zoom, HTC, Shahid, Microsoft, and NVIDIA were among the 320+ brands that exhibited at DeepFest over the past few years.

== See also ==
- Global Artificial Intelligence Summit & Awards
- Saudi Authority for Data and Artificial Intelligence
