= Telecommunications in Saudi Arabia =

Telecommunications in Saudi Arabia have evolved early in the Kingdom since the establishment the Directorate of Post, Telephone and Telegraph (PTT) in 1926.

== History ==
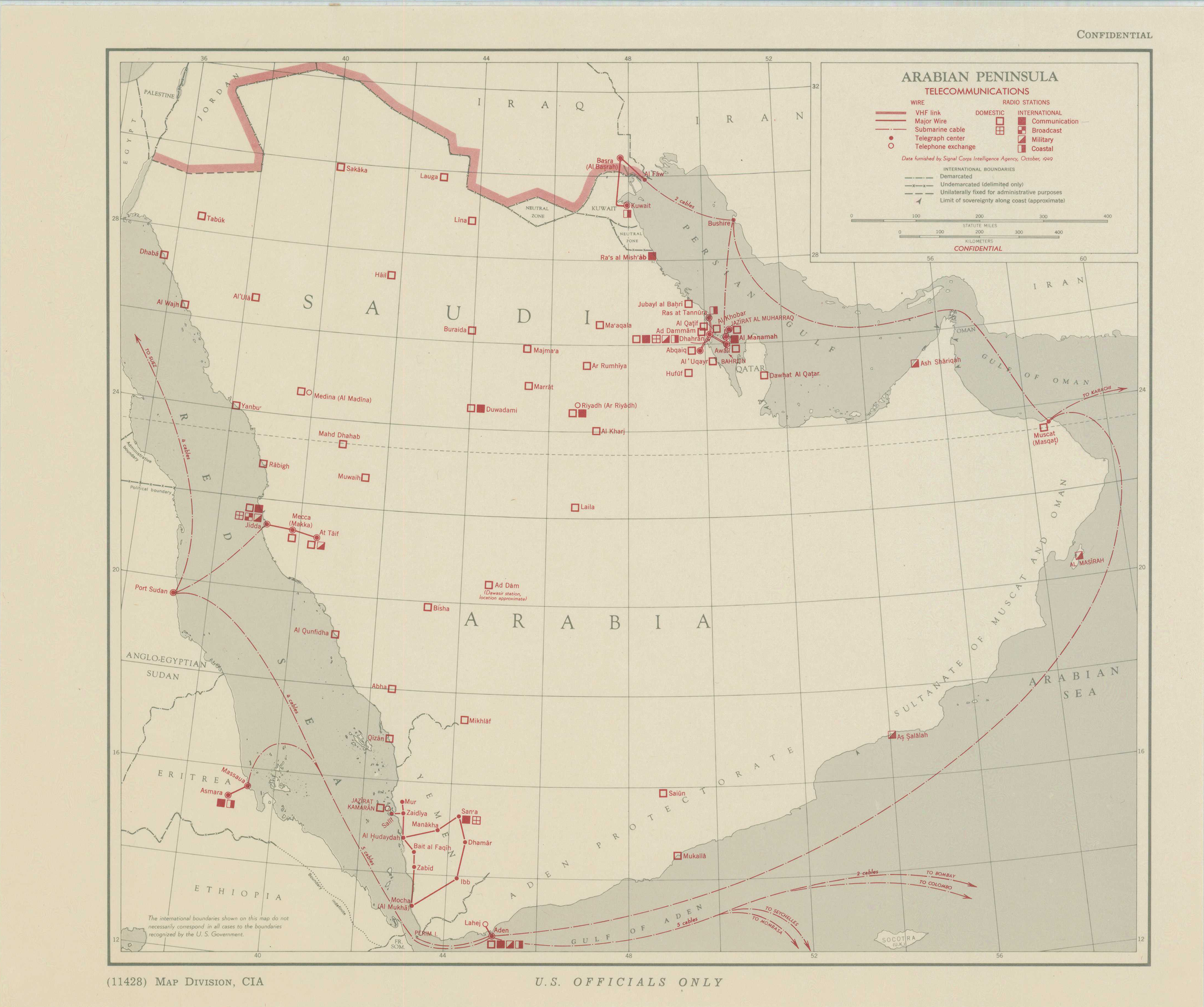
CIA map of telecommunication infrastructure in the Arabian Peninsula, 1949

The Directorate of Post, Telephone and Telegraph (PTT) was the first governmental entity established by the founder King Abdul Aziz Al-Saud in 1926 to provide and control the postal and telecommunication services. In 1934 the Kingdom imported the first mobile wireless station to provide the telegraph services. In the same year, the telephone service was also launched to link cities and villages in the Kingdom. In 1984 the first fiber optic network was introduced and operated in the country, whereas in 1995 the mobile phone service was introduced .

Saudi Telecom Company (STC) was the first company in Saudi Arabia to provide Mobile and Fixed line Telephone service. While the first internet connectivity was offered by Sahara Net in summer of 1994, the Communications Commission then allowed other companies to compete with STC in Saudi Arabia taking the total number of companies to five: (1). STC Mobile: It includes landlines and mobile, and includes a mobile (phone). (2) Integrated Telecom Company (ITC) second operator after STC, established in 2005 and offers internet, broadband, connectivity and satellite services for businesses, consumers and wholesale (3). Mobily: the UAE's telecommunications company, which is the mobile and internet Fabraupetk (Fiber Optic) New Ground. (4). ZIN Zain: a Kuwaiti company, which is the only mobile (5). GO ATHEEB: a Saudi modern, with an Internet connection line is similar to Ground. In 2019, Saudi Arabia was ranked the second among the G20 countries in regards of the availability of radio spectrum awarded to operators for public mobile telecom services.

== Telephones ==
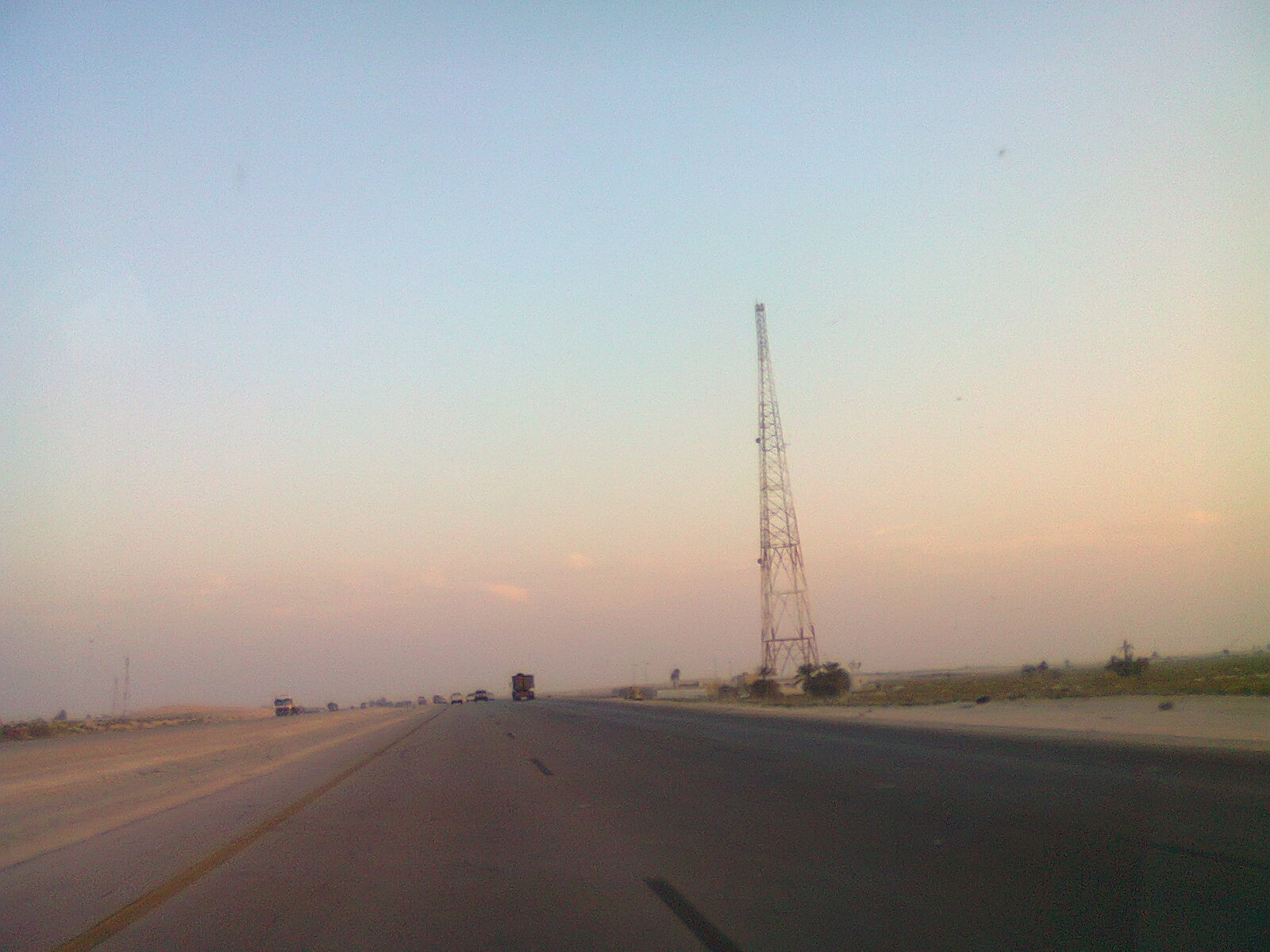
A mobile phone tower in Qatif

Telephones - main lines in use: 011 463,3507 (2011 - source: ITU)

Telephones - mobile cellular: 53,705,808 (2011 - source: ITU)
note: In 2004, the Saudi Telecom Company (STC) monopolization was broken by authorizing Etihad Etisalat/Mobily to compete in mobile communication, in June 2009 GO Telecom (Etihad Atheeb Telecom) or "جو" also entered the market.

Digital Radio Trunking- 100,000 (Unofficial):
In late 2005, bravO! Telecom was launched as the country's digital radio trunking operator under a B.O.T agreement with the incumbent operator STC, with an estimated 100,000 subscribers as of November 2007.

Telephone system:
domestic: extensive microwave radio relay and coaxial and fiber-optic cable systems

International:
International undersea cables: EIG, I-ME-WE, FEA, MENA, SEA-ME-WE 3, SEA-ME-WE 4, FALCON, SAS-1, SAS-2, Gulf Bridge International, TATA TGN-Gulf

Microwave radio relay to Bahrain, Jordan, Kuwait, Qatar, UAE, Yemen, and Sudan;

Coaxial cable to Kuwait and Jordan;

Satellite earth stations - 5 Intelsat (3 Atlantic Ocean and 2 Indian Ocean), 1 Arabsat, and 1 Inmarsat (Indian Ocean region)

== Radio ==
Radio broadcast stations: AM 43, FM 31, shortwave 2 (1998)

Radios: 6.25 million (1997)

== Television ==
Television broadcast stations: 117 (1997)

Televisions: 5.1 million (1997)

== Internet ==
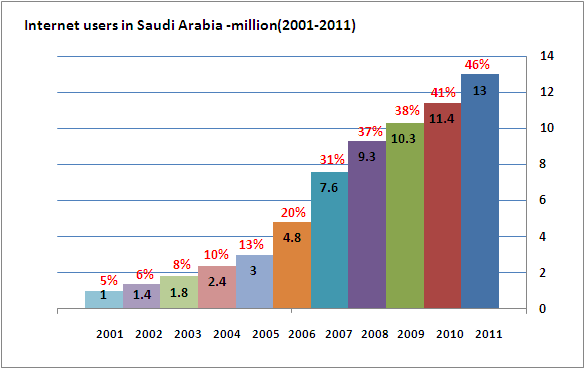
A graph showing the growth of Internet users in Saudi Arabia from 2001 to 2011

Internet service providers (ISPs): 22 (2005)

Internet users: 30.25 million, 91% of the population (2018)

Country code (Top level domain): .sa

Saudi Post

=== Broadband Internet access ===
An ADSL service in Saudi Arabia has become available since 2001. As part of its monopoly on all methods of communication in Saudi Arabia, the Saudi Telecom Company is the only complete provider, though several ISPs are available, with the permission of CITC.

STC is the only provider for telephone lines in Saudi Arabia. For this reason customers have to pay two fees, one to STC for activation of the ADSL service across the telephone line, and a second to an ISP to provide Internet service across the ADSL line. STC has been highly criticized for their service in providing ADSL access as customers had to wait many months to receive ADSL service on their phone lines. In 2006, STC had invested in increasing the size of their ADSL infrastructure and since then the wait times had improved, but many customers are still on waiting lists. Mobily, Integrated Telecom and STC also provide Fibre Optic Internet access, with coverage limited to larger cities.

As of 2011, the maximum Internet speed available is currently 200 Mbit/s.

Speed	Rate
2 Mbit/s	149 S.A.R ($39.70)
20 Mbit/s	249 S.A.R ($66.34)
40 Mbit/s	299 S.A.R ($79.67)
100 Mbit/s	449 S.A.R ($119.66)
200 Mbit/s	749 S.A.R ($199.57)

As of October 2006, the 20 Internet service providers in Saudi Arabia became connected through "Data service provider" -licensed companies, such as Saudi Telecom Company and Integrated Telecom Company. The ISPs were previously connected through KACST (King Abdulaziz City for Science and Technology), who was also responsible for DNS and filtering traffic. Since October 2006 the Communications and Information Technology Commission is responsible for DNS and filtering services.

There are several reasons for the service being unpopular, in particular the unreasonably expensive prices and incompetent low-quality service. Perhaps this was proved when STC submitted a request to enter neighboring Egypt as a provider and was refused due to lack of experience, staff, equipments and such.

In late 2005 it was announced that a company by the name of Electronet would start providing broadband connections through electric lines by mid-2006. However, as of early 2009 the service has not been implemented and the company's website has been idle for years. Some of the developed countries are having trouble implementing internet connections via power lines so it is highly unlikely this technology will ever appear in Saudi Arabia. Electronet is currently dissolved.

In 2019, the average speed of mobile internet services reached 37.5 Mbit/s jumping from 9.2 Mbit/s in 2017.

=== Internet censorship ===
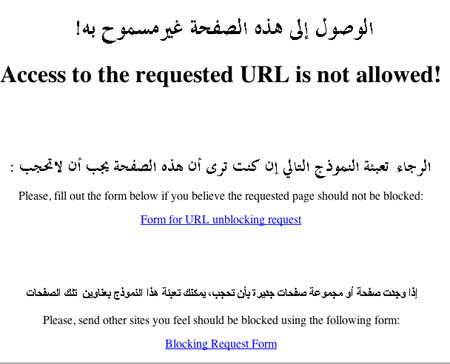
Screenshot of a Saudi Arabian ISP blocking a website

In August 2009 ONI classified Saudi Arabia as pervasive in the social and Internet tools areas, as substantial in political, and as selective in conflict.

Saudi Arabia notoriously on the spot addresses and bans more than 5 million websites on the web, mainly pornography which the government bans anything that is, LGBT rights in which same-sex sexual activity is illicit, human rights issues, terrorism, criticism against the kingdom and the royal family, information from enemies of Islam, and satire. Access to websites affiliated with Iran, with Hezbollah, with Yemeni groups and associated with the Syrian Muslim Brotherhood, and information telling about the Holocaust were blocked as well. An example of technology used for Internet surveillance and filtering in Saudi Arabia is American-owned SmartFilter.

=== Digital divide ===
Saudi Arabia's internet penetration rate reached 99.6% in 2025. The rate was 99.8% among males and 99.4% among females.

== See also ==
- Saudi Telecom Company
- Integrated Telecom Company
- Al Wafa Communication for Internet Services
- Bayanat Al Oula for Network Services
- Etihad Etisalat/Mobily
- List of Internet service providers in Saudi Arabia
