= Bayanat =

Bayanat Smart Solutions بيانات الأولى لخدمات الشبكات
- Company type: Division
- Industry: Telecommunications
- Founded: 2005
- Headquarters: Saudi Arabia
- Products: Broadband Internet, International Bandwidth, Connectivity Services (Wireless and Fiber) and Value-Added Services
- Parent: Space42 Plc
- Website: http://www.bayanat.com.sa/

Bayanat (also known as Bayanat Smart Solutions) (Arabic: بيانات الأولى لخدمات الشبكات) is a Saudi tech solutions provider established in 2005 by three Saudi leading communication firms: Nour Communications, Baud Telecom Company and Al-Harbi Telecom. Bayanat was licensed by the Communication & Information Technology Commission (CITC) to provide local, national, and international data communications services.

Bayanat also obtained a license to provide services in the Kingdom paving the way for the transfer of broadband data services to Large companies and small and medium enterprises. Bayanat, which paid 120 million Saudi riyals for the license fee valid for 25 years, has pledged to invest 2 billion riyals over the next five years in infrastructure development, including a high-speed fiber-optic cable network for high-quality data transmission to the kingdom and its neighbors.

In August 2024, the company along with Yahsat launched the EAU's first ever SAR satellite.

In October 2024, Bayanat merged with Yahsat to become Space42 Plc. The new entity retains the Bayanat brand.

== See also ==
- Communication in Saudi Arabia
- Integrated Telecom Company
- Saudi Telecom Company
- Mobily
