= Abdullah Alswaha =

Saudi government minister

His Excellency Abdullah Alswaha
- عبدالله بن عامر السواحه
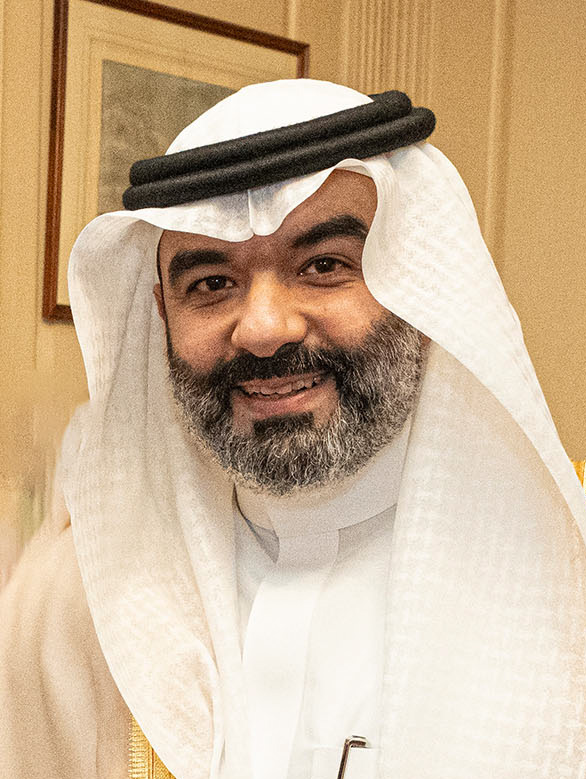
- Alswaha in 2024

Minister of Communications and Information Technology
- Incumbent
- Assumed office 23 April 2017
- Monarch: Salman
- Prime Minister: Salman (2017–2022); Mohammed bin Salman (2022–present)

Chairman of the Saudi Space Agency
- Incumbent
- Assumed office 3 May 2021

Personal details
- Education: King Fahd University of Petroleum and Minerals (KFUPM), University of Washington, Harvard Business School
- Occupation: Minister, Chairman

Abdullah bin Amer Alswaha (Arabic: عبدالله بن عامر السواحه) is a Saudi government minister who has served as the Minister of Communications and Information Technology since 2017. His ministry is responsible for developing Saudi Arabia's ICT infrastructure and workforce as part of the country's Vision 2030 programme. He was previously managing director of Cisco Saudi Arabia.

== Education ==
Alswaha has bachelor's degrees in Computer Science and Electrical Engineering. He studied as an undergraduate in Seattle and at the King Fahd University of Petroleum and Minerals. He has since done executive education programs at Harvard Business School.

== Public Service ==
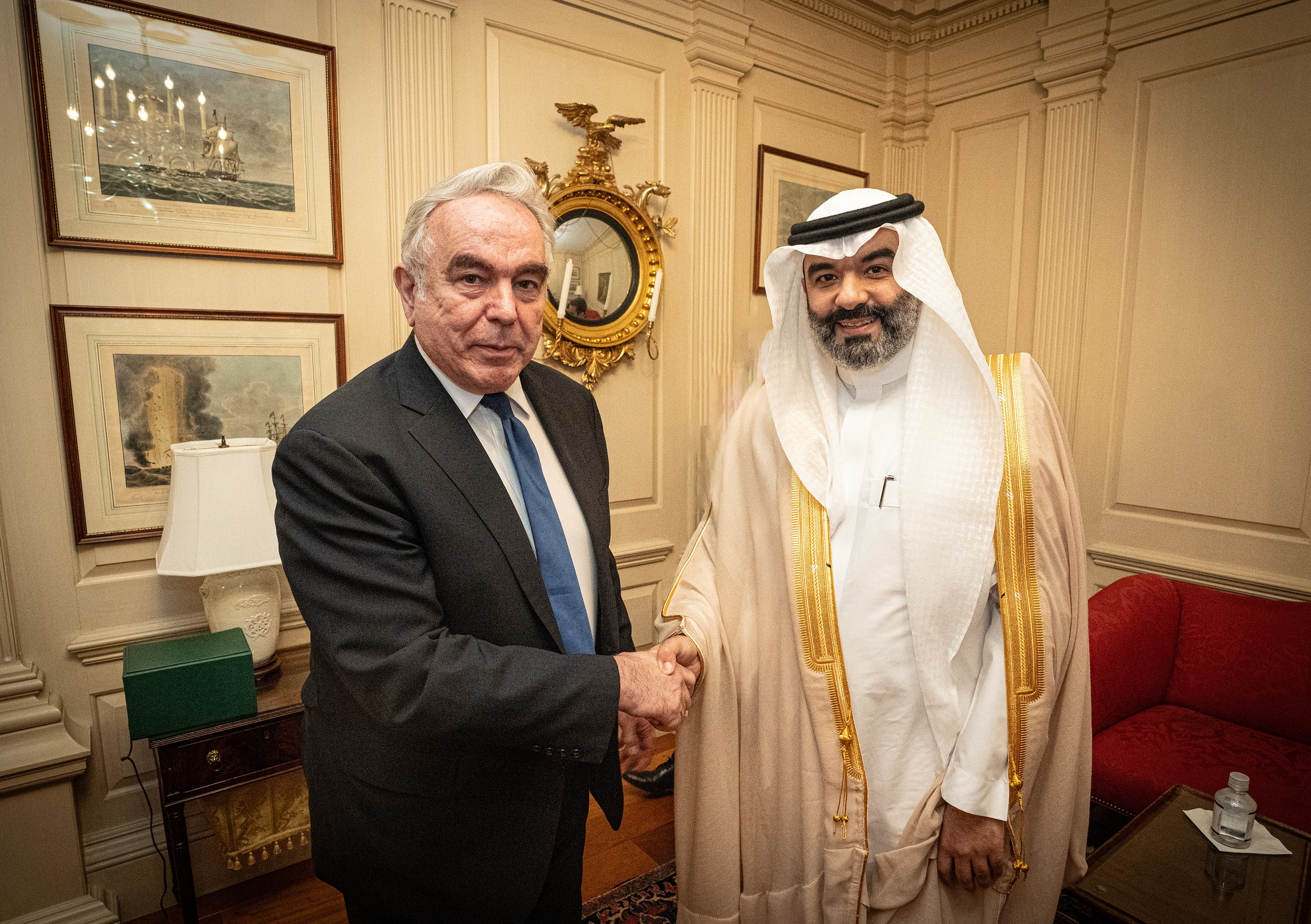
Alswaha with US Deputy Secretary of State Kurt Campbell in 2024

On May 3, 2021, the Custodian of the Two Holy Mosques King Salman bin Abdulaziz issued a Royal Decree appointing Alswaha to the post of chairman of the Saudi Space Agency.

In March of the same year, he was appointed as chairman of the board of directors for the King Abdulaziz City for Science and Technology.

He is also Minister of Communications and Information Technology and Chairman of the Communications and Information Technology Commission (CITC), posts he has held since April 2017.

== Private Sector Career ==
Alswaha began his career in 2005 at Cisco Saudi Arabia, becoming director of operations and overseeing the development of the company's systems engineering, public sector, commercial, service provider and channel operations. In May 2016, he was appointed managing director.

== High Profile Participations ==
At the Future Investment Initiative conference in Riyadh in October 2017, Alswaha announced a partnership between his ministry, the philanthropic organisation MiSK, and the Mohammed bin Salman College for Business and Entrepreneurship to put young local entrepreneurs and start-ups through a one-year training programme with big tech partners from the US and Europe. The same month he announced that Saudi Post, the government-operated postal system, would enter a five-year 'corporatization phase' before full privatization.

He has previously affirmed Saudi Arabia's commitment to business-friendly policy and has called for greater empowerment of women in the kingdom as part of the push to modernize its economy and workforce.

At the World Economic Forum in Davos in January 2018 Alswaha outlined Saudi Arabia's digital vision, announcing spending of $3 billion to roll out a nationwide 5G network and connect two million homes with high speed fiber optic.

At the Mobile World Congress in Barcelona, Alsawaha announced that in the framework of the Saudi Vision 2030, Saudi Arabia is planning to be a leading digital market in the Middle East and South Africa regions. Moreover, with the annual budget of $22 billion in the digital and IT sector, Saudi Arabia has become of the top ranked digital markets worldwide.

In december 2024, Alsawaha met with Elon Musk, CEO of Tesla and owner of the social media platform X, to enhance collaboration in the fields of space and artificial intelligence (AI). During their discussions, they explored opportunities for cooperation, particularly in developing innovative technologies such as Open Radio Access Network (Open RAN) systems, which are crucial for building a flexible and sustainable digital infrastructure aligned with Saudi Vision 2030. The meeting also highlighted Saudi Arabia's broader strategy to position itself as a global technology exporter, with significant investments in the technology sector and initiatives like the National Technology Development Program, which has attracted substantial venture capital funding.

At the LEAP 2025 Tech Conference in Riyadh, Alsawaha represented Saudi Arabia and announced $14.9 billion worth of investments in the technological sector. He highlighted significant growth in the industry, with tech jobs in Saudi Arabia increasing from 150,000 in 2021 to 381,000 in 2024.

== Primary Responsibilities ==
- Cabinet Minister of the Kingdom of Saudi Arabia
- Ministry of Communications and Information Technology
- Saudi Space Agency, Chairman
- The Research, Development and Innovation Authority, Chairman
- Digital Government Authority, Chairman
- King Abdulaziz City for Science and Technology, Chairman

== Additional Responsibilities and Affiliations ==
- Communications and Information Technology Commission (CITC), Chairman
- The Research, Development and Innovation Authority, Chairman
- Digital Government Authority, Chairman
- Saudi Space Agency, Chairman
- King Abdulaziz City for Science and Technology, Chairman
- Saudi Post, Chairman
- National Committee for Digital Transformation, Chairman
- Board Member, Misk Foundation
- Board Member, Neom
- Board Member, Council of Economic and Development Affairs
- Board Member, Economic Cities Authority
- Board Member, World Economic Forum Centre for the Fourth Industrial Revolution Global Network Advisory

== Previous positions ==
Abdullah Alswaha formerly held other positions, including member of the Technology Advisory Board at Prince Mohammed Bin Fahd University (PMU). He was also the founder of the Social Entrepreneurship Incubator, which supports entrepreneurs to develop solutions in the fields of healthcare and education.

== Read Also ==
- Ministry of Communications and Information Technology (Saudi Arabia)
- Communications, Space and Technology Commission (Saudi Arabia)
- Mohammed Altamimi
- Haitham Abdulrahman Al-Ohali
