= Muhammad Jamil Ahmad Mulla =

Saudi engineer and government official (born 1946)

Minister of Telecommunications and Information Technology
- In office 1 May 2003 – 8 December 2014
- Prime Minister: King Fahd; King Abdullah
- Preceded by: Office established
- Succeeded by: Fahd bin Matad bin Shafaq Al Hamad

Personal details
- Born: Muhammad bin Jamil bin Ahmad Mulla; 12 December 1946 (age 79) Madinah, Saudi Arabia
- Education: King Saud University; University of Colorado at Boulder

Muhammad Jamil Ahmad Mulla (Arabic: محمد جميل أحمد الملا; born 12 December 1946) is a Saudi engineer who was minister of communications and information technology from 2003 to 2014.

== Early life and education ==
Mulla was born in Madinah on 12 December 1946.

Mulla is a graduate of King Saud University where he received a Bachelor of Science degree in electrical engineering in 1972. Then he obtained a Master of Science degree in telecommunications from the University of Colorado at Boulder in 1979. He also participated in various training programs in different countries.

== Career ==
Mulla began his career at the ministry of post, telegraph and telephone in 1972, working initially as a radio engineer and then as an electrical engineer. Later he served as a Riyadh province manager and general manager of the central region for telecommunications. In June 2001, Mullah was named as the governor of the Saudi Telecom Authority. Next, he was appointed assistant deputy minister and then deputy minister of post, telegraph and telephone in charge of operation and maintenance affairs. He then became the governor of the Saudi communications commission.

Mullah was appointed minister of communications and information technology when the office established on 1 May 2003. His term ended on 8 December 2014 when Fahd bin Matad bin Shafaq Al Hamad was appointed to the post.

Political offices
Preceded by Office established	Minister of Communications and Information Technology; 2003 – 2014	Succeeded by Fahd bin Matad bin Shafaq Al Hamad
