= National Center for Digital Certification =

Government agency in Saudi Arabia

National Center for Digital Certification (NCDC)
Agency overview
- Formed: 2001
- Jurisdiction: Saudi Arabia
- Headquarters: Riyadh, Saudi Arabia
- Parent department: Ministry of Communication and Information Technology

The National Center for Digital Certification (NCDC) is a government agency in Saudi Arabia responsible for the management of Public Key Infrastructure (PKI). NCDC is governed by the Ministry of Communication and Information Technology and aims at providing trust services for the secure information exchange and transmission between participants including government sectors, citizens and the business sector.

== History ==
NCDC was established in 2001 where its primary task is managing the Public Key Infrastructure and encryption was assigned to King Abdul Aziz City for Science and Technology (KACST). However, in 2005, NCDC was transferred to the Ministry of Communications and Information Technology.

== NCDC Services ==
The main task of NCDC is to nationally provide secure, efficient, and reliable systems for information exchange and transmission. these services include issue and processing Digital Certificates from a government certificate authority, and checking certificates validity using application based on Public Key Infrastructure (PKI).
