= List of internet service providers in Saudi Arabia =

This is a list of internet service providers (ISPs) in Saudi Arabia.

Internet in Saudi Arabia is provided by several service providers: the Saudi Telecom, the CITC, and the ISP that provides the monthly subscriptions.

== ISPs in Saudi Arabia ==
- NourNet
- MEL
- NOVAsat
- ATSS
- Saudi Call
- Madarat
- Amazenet
- First Tech (OneWeb)
- Immarsat
- Salam
- GO Telecom
- Zain
- stc (Saudi Telecom)
- Gulf Computer Services Co. (SPSNET)

== See also ==
- Ministry of Media (Saudi Arabia)
