= Olayan bin Mohammed Alwetaid =

Saudi Arabian electrical engineer

- عليان محمد الوتيد

CEO of the Saudi Telecom Company
- In office March 28, 2021–present

Personal details
- Citizenship: Saudi Arabian
- Education: King Fahd University of Petroleum and Minerals (BA)

Olayan bin Mohammed Alwetaid (Arabic: عليان محمد الوتيد) is a Saudi business executive and electrical engineer who was appointed as the CEO of STC Group in March 2021.

== Education ==
Alwetaid received his Bachelor's degree in electrical engineering from King Fahd University of Petroleum and Minerals (KFUPM).

== Career ==
Alwetaid joined the state-owned petroleum and natural gas company, Aramco at the beginning of his career before joining stc Group where he has held several positions. During his tenure with the stc Group, he held the position of CEO of stc Bahrain then was appointed as the Senior Vice President of Consumer Unit of the group.

Alwetaid chairs several boards of directors of the stc Group subsidiaries such as Intigral and Contact Center Company (CCC).

Alwetaid is the Chairman of the SAMENA Telecommunications Council, a board member of the GSM Association, and a board member of the King Abdulaziz City for Science and Technology (KACST).

In January 2021, stc Group announced in a statement to Saudi Exchange (Tadawul) appointing Alwetaid as the Group Chief executive officer (GCEO) of stc starting March 28, 2021, succeeding Nasser al-Nasser who resigned in November 2020.

Through his position as the GCEO, the stc Group expanded into several sectors including fintech, the Internet of Things (IoT), cybersecurity, artificial intelligence (AI), and data centers. In September 2023, under his guidance, stc acquired a stake of almost 9.9% in Telefonica Group.

In 2022, he was ranked 18th among the Top 100 CEOs list in the Middle East by Forbes, and ranked 8th among 2023 Top 100 CEOs list.
