= InFlavour =

Food and Beverages expo in Saudi Arabia

- Status: Active
- Genre: Food and Beverages
- Venue: Riyadh Front Exhibition and Conference Center (RFECC)
- Location: Riyadh
- Country: Saudi Arabia
- Inaugurated: 29–31 October 2023
- Founders: Tahaluf
- Attendance: 30,000+ (2023)
- Website: inflavourexpo.com

InFlavour is a three-day food and beverage expo held annually in Riyadh, Saudi Arabia, and is considered the largest, government-backed food and beverage event in Saudi Arabia. InFlavour was created by Tahaluf in partnership with the Ministry of Environment, Water and Agriculture of Saudi Arabia (MEWA) in 2023.

== History ==
InFlavour was created in 2023 by Tahaluf in partnership with Saudi Arabia's Ministry of Environment, Water, and Agriculture (MEWA), and was held for the first time in Malham, Riyadh, Saudi Arabia at the Riyadh Exhibition and Convention Centre from 29 to 31 October 2023. InFlavour is considered the largest government-backed food and beverage event in Saudi Arabia in terms of gross square meters and global prestige.

The inaugural event attracted tens of thousands of visitors, being joined by 400 brands, 200 investors, and 200 speakers representing 143 countries across the three days.

InFlavour 2023 hosted the Five-Star Pitch Fest, a three-day startup pitch competition that invited pioneers in food, tech, and hospitality. The competition provided startups with the opportunity to compete for one of three awards: the Plant The Idea Award, the Flourishing Founder Award, and the InFlavour Award.

At the InFlavour 2023 competition, A Dozen Cousins, a US-based natural food brand that makes products inspired by traditional Creole, Caribbean, and Latin American cuisines won the InFlavour Award of $30,000 as part of the Five-Star Pitch Fest competition.

== Speakers and partners ==
InFlavour 2023 featured over 200 speakers and celebrities including Prince Khaled bin Alwaleed Al Saud, Manal Al Alem, Marco Pierre White, and Miyoko Schinner. InFlavour's sponsors and partners include government entities and brands including Lugmety, PepsiCo, Pure Beverages Industry Company, Saudi Business Center, and the National Agricultural Development Company (Nadec).
