= AlSaudiah =

Internationalized country code top-level domain for Saudi Arabia

السعودية
- Introduced: 2010
- TLD type: Internationalised country code top-level domain
- Status: Active
- Registry: SaudiNIC
- Intended use: Entities connected with Saudi Arabia in the Arabic language
- Registered domains: 1,075 (21 August 2023)
- DNS name: xn--mgberp4a5d4ar

The Arabic name السعودية, romanized as AlSaudiah, is the Internationalized country code top-level domain for Saudi Arabia.

== History ==
The top-level domain was installed in the DNS on May 5, 2010. It was among the first non-Latin top-level domains to ever go live.

The delegation was approved by the ICANN Board of Directors thirteen days earlier in resolution 2010.04.22.06. The Saudi Arabian Communications and Information Technology Commission (CITC) is the sponsoring organisation. The addition of the Saudi Arabian delegation along with two simultaneous delegations, مصر (Egypt) and امارات (United Arab Emirates), meant that it was the first time Arabic had been used as the script for a TLD. This addition took place within the DNS root zone on 5 May 2010.

Government organizations were able to register the domain name for the first time from 31 May 2010 to 12 July 2010, followed by a public landrush phase that opened on 27 September 2010, when SaudiNIC began accepting domain name registrations from general public applicants on a first-come, first-served basis. By 2013, 1,939 AlSaudiah domain names were registered.

== Description ==
AlSaudiah (السعودية) is the Internationalized country code top-level domain for Saudi Arabia. Registration for domain names under السعودية. are limited to certain individuals / entities. The Saudi Domain Names Registration Regulation states that domains may be registered by: an entity within Saudi Arabia, a person who is a national of Saudi Arabia or has Premium Residency, an entity who holds a registration or licence from an appropriate authority in Saudi Arabia or an owner of a trademark or trade name registered in Saudi Arabia. The top-level domain is managed by the Saudi Network Information Center (SaudiNIC).

The ASCII form of this domain (as used in the Domain Name System) is xn--mgberp4a5d4ar which follows the Internationalizing Domain Names in Applications (IDNA) rules for converting the Unicode form of the script version.

Saudi Arabia is also assigned the country code top-level domain .sa.

== See also ==
- Saudi Network Information Center
- .sa
