= .sa =

Latin alphabet Internet country code top-level domain for Saudi Arabia

- Introduced: 17 May 1994
- TLD type: Country code top-level domain
- Status: Active
- Registry: Communications and Information Technology Commission (SaudiNIC Unit)
- Sponsor: Communications and Information Technology Commission
- Intended use: Entities connected with Saudi Arabia
- Actual use: Gets some use in Saudi Arabia as well as websites related to Sonic Adventure
- Registered domains: 54,330 (21 August 2023)
- Registration restrictions: Must have Saudi presence, a local representative, or trademark registered in Saudi Arabia; must show legal papers verifying identity
- Structure: Second level domains registration is available under (.sa) and (السعودية.), the third level domains registration is available beneath various second-level labels
- Documents: Rules
- Registry website: SaudiNIC

.sa is the Latin alphabet Internet country code top-level domain (ccTLD) of Saudi Arabia. Domains of this type can be registered through SaudiNIC, a department of the Communications and Information Technology Commission. The Arabic alphabet ccTLD of Saudi Arabia is السعودية.

== History ==
The .sa top-level domain was managed by the King Abdulaziz City for Science and Technology from 1995 to 2006. It was then transferred to Saudi Network Information Center (SaudiNIC).

As of 21 August 2023, 54,330 .sa domain names were registered.

== Second-level domains ==
The second-level domains that are officially open to third-level registrations are:

- com.sa: Commercial entities and registered trademarks
- edu.sa: Educational institutions
- sch.sa: Elementary and secondary schools
- med.sa: Health services (hospitals, clinics, etc.)
- gov.sa: Governmental entities
- net.sa: Internet-related services (ISPs, web hosting, portal sites, etc.)
- org.sa: Non-profit organizations
- pub.sa: Entities or individuals that do not fit in other categories, including personal names.

== Internationalized country code TLD ==
Saudi Arabia was one of the first countries to apply for the new internationalized domain name (IDN) country code top-level domains authorized by the Internet Corporation for Assigned Names and Numbers (ICANN) in 2009. In January 2010, ICANN announced that the Saudi IDN ccTLD (xn--mgberp4a5d4ar, السعودية) one of the first four new IDN ccTLDs to have passed the Fast Track String Evaluation within the domain application process.

== See also ==
- Saudi Network Information Center
- AlSaudiah
