= Tahaluf =

Saudi-based event management company

- Type: Joint Venture
- Industry: Events
- Founded: 2022
- Headquarters: Riyadh, Saudi Arabia
- Key people: Mike Champion (CEO), Lord Stephen Carter (Co-Chairman), Faisal Al Khamisi (Co-Chairman)
- Services: Live events, Exhibitions, Conferences, Festivals
- Number of employees: 300 (2025)
- Parent: Informa
- Website: tahaluf.com

Tahaluf (Arabic: تحالف, 'alliance') is a Saudi British events and exhibitions company founded in 2022 as a joint venture between Informa PLC, a London-based exhibitions and business intelligence group, and the Saudi Federation for Cybersecurity, Programming and Drones (SAFCSP). In 2023, the Events Investment Fund (EIF), a subsidiary of the National Development Fund, acquired a significant stake. Tahaluf develops and operates international exhibitions in Saudi Arabia and abroad across sectors, including technology, real estate, healthcare, maritime, religious tourism, and pharmaceuticals.

== History ==
In February 2022, Mike Champion and Annabelle Mander collaborated with the Saudi Federation for Cybersecurity, Programming and Drones (SAFCSP) and the Ministry of Communications and Information Technology (MCIT) to co-found the LEAP Tech Event technology conference in Riyadh. In the same month, the inaugural edition was billed as the largest debut tech event in history, attracting over 100,000 professionals from the global tech community, including leaders, investors, and hundreds of exhibitors. In November 2022, Tahaluf and the SAFCSP co-organised Black Hat Middle East and Africa (formerly @HACK), held in Riyadh, Saudi Arabia during the Riyadh Season.

In June 2023, the Events Investment Fund (EIF), a subsidiary of Saudi Arabia's National Development Fund, announced the acquisition of a significant stake in Tahaluf. It is regarded as the first major joint venture in the events sector established to support Saudi Arabia's goal of becoming a global hub for hosting conferences, international exhibitions, and gatherings.

In August 2023, Tahaluf entered into a three-year agreement with the Ministry of Municipal and Rural Affairs and Housing to organise Cityscape Global, an international real estate exhibition and the world's largest property development event to be held in Saudi Arabia. The following month, Tahaluf hosted the inaugural edition of Cityscape at the Riyadh International Convention and Exhibition Center in Malham, Saudi Arabia. The event recorded property deals exceeding $29 billion.

In April 2025, Tahaluf organised the second edition of the Umrah and Ziyarah Forum (UZF), a three-day conference held at the King Salman International Convention Center in Madinah, Saudi Arabia. The UZF exhibition brought together international and local tour operators, technology innovators, and service providers. The following month, Tahaluf entered into a strategic partnership with EWPartners, a Riyadh-based global investment firm, to launch LEAP East, the Asia-Pacific edition of Saudi Arabia's LEAP tech event. LEAP East is scheduled to take place from 8 to 10 July 2026 at the Hong Kong Convention and Exhibition Centre (HKEC).

In September, Tahaluf organised Money20/20 Middle East in Riyadh, which attracted over 450 fintech companies, more than 1,050 investors, and an audience of over 38,500 attendees. It was the largest fintech gathering ever held in the Middle East and the second-largest globally. In October, Tahaluf hosted the seventh edition of the Global Health Exhibition under the slogan "Invest in Health" at the Riyadh Exhibition and Convention Centre. The event was held under the auspices of the Ministry of Health and supported by the Health Sector Transformation Program. In the same month, the Financial Times reported that Informa's Tahaluf is generating more than $250 million in revenue. While Tahaluf operates 21 event brands, an article published in November 2025 by Arab News reported that Saudi Arabia's transformation is increasingly driven by its events sector, not just by infrastructure development and mega-projects.

In December 2025, Tahaluf announced the inaugural Kingdom of Gaming, Saudi Arabia’s first game-creation ecosystem, which is scheduled to take place from 1 to 3 December 2026 and will be co-located with Black Hat MEA 2026.

By the end of 2025, Tahaluf is expected to operate 21 distinct event brands, with an additional five launches planned for 2026 across the technology, healthcare, real estate, finance, and religious tourism sectors.

== Events ==
=== LEAP Tech Event ===
LEAP Tech Conference is Saudi Arabia's global technology event, organised annually by Tahaluf in collaboration with the Ministry of Communications and Information Technology (MCIT) and the Saudi Federation for Cybersecurity, Programming, and Drones (SAFCSP). A sub-event of LEAP, DeepFest, is an annual conference dedicated to artificial intelligence and data science, powered by the Saudi Authority for Data and Artificial Intelligence (SDAIA).

=== Black Hat Middle East and Africa ===
Black Hat Middle East & Africa (Black Hat MEA) is an annual cybersecurity conference held in Riyadh, Saudi Arabia. The event was originally launched as @HACK in 2021 and was rebranded as Black Hat MEA in 2022. It is organised in partnership with the Saudi Federation for Cybersecurity, Programming, and Drones (SAFCSP) and Tahaluf, an Informa company. The 2025 edition featured 40,000 attendees, 300 speakers, 200 hours of technical content, and saw a 55% increase in attendance compared to the 2024 edition.

=== Cityscape Global ===
Cityscape Global is an annual real estate exhibition that debuted in Riyadh in 2023. Tahaluf organises Cityscape Global in partnership with the Saudi Ministry of Municipal and Rural Affairs and Housing.

During the 2024 edition, the event recorded $532 million in sales by the Saudi National Housing Company (NHC). The event featured the announcement of three major new developments by the NHC, and the signing of a significant Service Provision Agreement between the Ministry of Interior and the Ministry of Municipal and Rural Affairs and Housing. The 2025 edition hosted 577 exhibitors and recorded the signing of real estate agreements and deals of $63.2 billion.

=== Money20/20 Middle East ===
Money20/20 Middle East is an annual financial technology (fintech) conference organised by Tahaluf. The 2025 edition was regarded as the largest fintech gathering ever held in the Middle East and the second-largest worldwide.

=== Global Health Exhibition ===
Tahaluf organised the Global Health Exhibition for the first time in 2024 at the Riyadh Exhibition and Convention Centre in Malham.

The event is organized by Tahaluf with the support of the Ministry of Health and the Health Sector Transformation Program. The 2024 edition of the exhibition generated SR55 billion ($14.66 billion) in investment, while the 2025 edition recorded partnerships and projects totaling SR124 billion.

=== CPHI Middle East ===
CPHI Middle East is a pharmaceutical exhibition that brings together buyers, manufacturers, and suppliers to explore business opportunities and industry trends. The 2024 edition was held from 10 to 12 December at the Riyadh Front Exhibition and Convention Centre, attracting more than 30,000 attendees from over 100 countries. The event featured over 400 exhibitors, including Sudair Pharma, Tabuk Pharmaceuticals, Hikma Pharmaceuticals, and Julphar.

=== LEAP East ===
LEAP East is the Asia–Pacific edition of the LEAP technology conference. It was announced in 2025 and is scheduled to take place in July 2026 at the Hong Kong Convention and Exhibition Centre (HKEC).

Other Tahaluf notable events include DeepFest, 24fintech, BIO Middle East (scheduled for May 2026) and the 31st edition of Routes World (scheduled for October 2026).

== Speakers and partners ==
Tahaluf notable speakers include Tim Draper, Thierry Henry, Steven Bartlett, Anthony Joshua, Luís Figo, Didier Drogba, will.i.am, Patrice Evra, Francesco Totti, Dominic Thiem, Karren Brady and James Caan.

Tahaluf delivers its events in partnership with multiple Saudi government entities, including Ministry of Communications and Information Technology (MCIT), the Saudi Federation for Cybersecurity, Programming and Drones (SAFCSP), the Ministry of Municipalities and Housing (MOMAH), the Ministry of Health, the General Authority of Civil Aviation (GACA), Saudi Food and Drug Authority (SFDA), Ministry of Health And Prevention, the Real Estate General Authority (REGA), the Housing Program, and the Saudi Tourism Authority.

== Economic impact ==
At the 2025 Gulf Business Summit, Tahaluf CEO Mike Champion reported that the company's recurring events generated an economic impact of $17.6 billion for Saudi Arabia between 2023 and 2025, surpassing the $17 billion impact of the 2022 FIFA World Cup in Qatar, a one-time mega-event.
