= Emnico Technologies =

- Company type: Private
- Industry: Information technology
- Founded: 2007
- Defunct: 2021
- Headquarters: Swindon, United Kingdom
- Area served: United Kingdom
- Key people: Heydar Faramarzi
- Products: EmNOC
- Services: Application service provider Technical support

Emnico Technologies is a British-based Information technology business. With headquarters in Swindon, Wiltshire, Emnico provide bespoke software applications and Internet services including Website design and development.

== History ==
Emnico Technologies was founded in 2007 by Heydar Faramarzi and was immediately joined by his team of IT experts. Growing to 20 employees by January 2009, the company won contracts with a number of local, national and international businesses to produce and support existing and bespoke business applications.

Emnico expanded its operations to include technical support provision in 2009 and expanded its client-base, this enabled it to be able to provide ad-hoc services to local charities and non-profit organisations. The company continued this trend, gaining a contract with charity services provider Charity Business in March 2010.

== Emnico Green ==
Emnico Green was launched to help raise the profile of 'Green IT' and companies requirements under the European Union's WEEE Directive. This enabled them to accept donated end-of-life IT equipment and redeploy, recycle or otherwise dispose of it via approved third parties and in line with government and EU legislation. Equipment of an acceptable standard were provided to charitable organisations under the scheme.
