= Mohammed I. Al-Suwaiyel =

Saudi politician

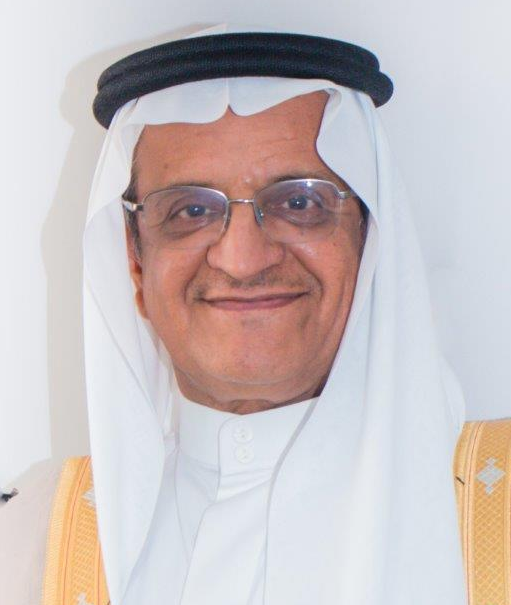

Mohammed Ibrahim Al-Suwaiyel (born 25 December 1950) (Arabic: محمد بن إبراهيم السويل) is a Saudi politician. He was appointed as the Minister of Communications and Information Technology of Saudi Arabia on 29 January 2015. He served in that position until 22 April 2017, when he was replaced by Abdullah bin Amer Al-Sawaha.

== Career ==
Al-Suwaiyel is a member of the Board of Economic Affairs and Development, Chairman of the Board of Directors of Communications and Information Technology Commission, and Chairman of the Board of Directors of the Saudi Postal Corporation.

He was a Professor and Dean of Computer Science and Engineering College at King Fahd University of Petroleum & Minerals (KFUPM) from 1972 to 1990. He was the Vice President for Research Institutes at King Abdulaziz City for Science and Technology (KACST) from 1990 to 2003. From March 2003 until June 2007 he was the Governor of Communications and Information Technology Commission (CITC). From July 2007 till January 2015 Al-Suwaiyel was the President of KACST.

He was a Member of boards and councils, including the Board of Directors of Saudi Aramco, the Board of Directors of King Salman Center for Disability Research, the International Advisory Council for King Abdullah University for Science and Technology (KAUST), and the International Advisory Council for King Abdullah Petroleum Studies and Research Center (KAPSARC) a member of Board of Directors of Military Industries Corporation and a member of Board of Trustees Award - King Abdullah bin Abdulaziz International Award Translation.

== Early years ==
He was born in Al-Mahad, Saudi Arabia, on 25 December 1950. Al-Suwaiyel obtained Bachelor of Science in General Engineering (Systems) from King Fahd University of Petroleum and Minerals in 1972, an M.Sc. (Master of Science) in 1975, and a Ph.D. (Doctor of Philosophy) in Computer Science (Algorithms) in 1979 from the University of Southern California.

== Professional career ==
Al-Suwaiyel was awarded the Medal of Merit (First Class) in 1985, the Best Teacher Award at KFUPM in 1989 and the Middle East CEO of the Year Award in 2007. He taught courses in Computer Science, Mathematics and Data Security at King Fahad University of Petroleum and Minerals and King Saud University where he published papers in specialized journals and conferences. His research interests include Discrete Mathematics, Computational Complexity, Algorithms and Cryptography.

Al-Suwaiyel speaks Arabic, English, Spanish, Portuguese, French, Chinese and a little Japanese.
