= WaferCatalyst =

WaferCatalyst is a Multi-Project Wafer (MPW) consolidation service by King Abdulaziz City for Science and Technology (KACST), Saudi Arabia. WaferCatalyst is a concept to silicon service and provides a number of tools for community building in the field of integrated circuit (IC) design. These include Multi-project wafer service fabrication, multi-layer mask (MLM), design support, consultancy services and fabrication support.

== History ==
Microsystems Infrastructure Development initiative (MIDI) was launched by Micro-Sensors Division (MSD) under the National Center of Electronics, Communications and Photonics in early 2012 and was chartered to create and develop integrated circuit ecosystem in the Kingdom of Saudi Arabia. The service developed as a result of this initiative is called 'WaferCatalyst' which has been chartered to serve Saudi Arabia, greater Middle East & North Africa region as well as the global community in semiconductor design. It was formally launched on 28 April 2013 by H.H. Prince Dr. Turki bin Saud bin Mohammad Al Saud, Vice President for Research Institutes of the Kingdom of Saudi Arabia.

== Programs ==
WaferCatalyst has a number of programs to enhance the ecosystem in IC development area. These include support services through its Support and Design Portal, support on process development kits, support for universities in taping out of ICs, project titles for undergraduate/post-graduate students and partners program.

WaferCatalyst has been working to develop close coordination and partnerships among the various institutions, research and commercial organizations to add value for themselves while also contributing to the development of a virtual cluster ecosystem.

== Related links ==
Multi-project wafer service
