= Saudi Network Information Center =

The Saudi Network Information Center, abbreviated SaudiNIC is the Country code top-level domain registry for the domain name space — under (.sa and السعودية.) — for Saudi Arabia.

The SaudiNIC mandate includes the operation of the DNS root servers for the local domain space as well as all registry services, including the registration services and technical support.

From its inception in 1995 until late 2006, SaudiNIC was managed and operated by the King Abdulaziz City for Science and Technology. The task of operating SaudiNIC was transferred by ministerial direction to a statutory corporation, the Communications and Information Technology Commission.
