= Jelly (YouTuber) =

Dutch YouTuber and vlogger (born 1996)

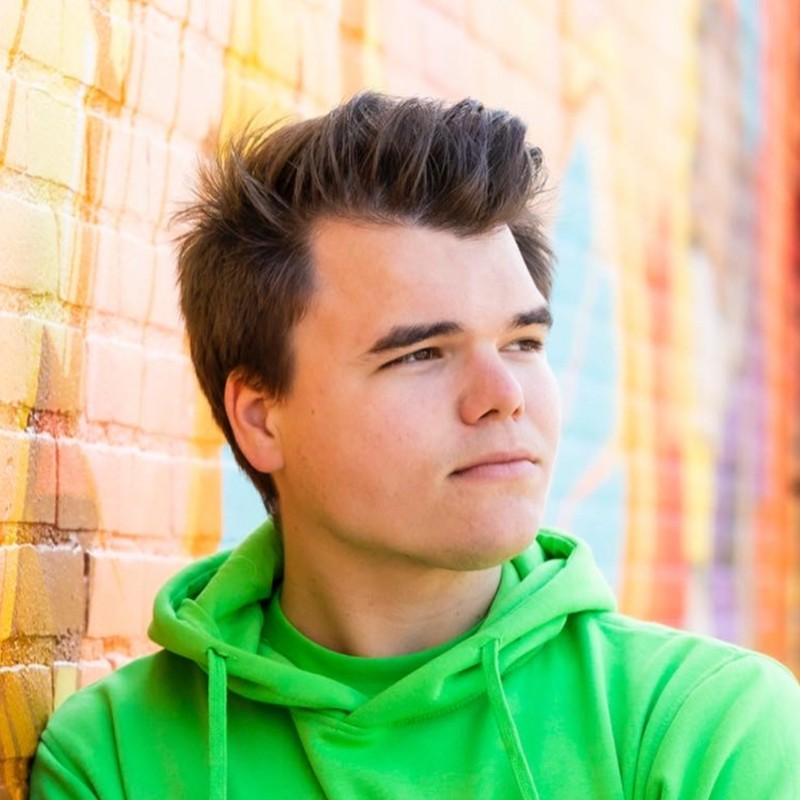
- Van Vucht in 2022
- Born: Jelle van Vucht; 14 October 1996 (age 30); Roermond, Netherlands
- Occupations: YouTuber; influencer; media personality; vlogger
- Years active: 2014–present
- Organization: Robust Worldwide Limited
- Partner: Sanna (2014–present)
- Awards: Gaming Influencer of the Year Award

Instagram information
- Page: Jelly
- Years active: 2014–present
- Followers: 1.1 million

TikTok information
- Page: jelly
- Years active: 2020–present
- Followers: 2.3 million

Twitch information
- Channel: JellyYT
- Years active: 2026–present
- Genres: Just Chatting; Gaming
- Followers: 51 thousand

X information
- Handle: @JeIIy
- Years active: 2011–present
- Followers: 322 thousand

YouTube information
- Channels: @Jelly; @Jelly2_0; @JellyBloxed
- Years active: 2014–present
- Genres: Gaming; reaction; vlogs
- Subscribers: 23.5 million (combined)
- Views: 15.310 billion (combined)
- Last updated: 6 September 2026
- Website: jellystore.com

Jelle van Vucht (born 14 October 1996), known professionally online as Jelly, is a Dutch YouTuber, influencer, media personality, vlogger, and live streamer known for his gaming content, playing games like Grand Theft Auto V, reaction, and vlog videos. As of 2026, Van Vucht resides in Marbella with his girlfriend Sanna.

== Early life ==
Jelle van Vucht was born on 14 October 1996, in Roermond, the Netherlands.

== Career ==
Van Vucht started content creation in the 2010s, focusing on gaming and reaction videos. During the mid-2010s, his channel accelerated in growth as gaming content on YouTube became increasingly popular. van Vucht became known for his frequent uploads, often uploading multiple times a day.

Around this point, he began collaborating with other content creators, most notably Kwebbelkop and Slogoman, with whom he formed a trio with them known as Robust. In 2019, Van Vucht was listed by Business Insider as the 4th biggest YouTuber in the world.

In 2017, Van Vucht joined a multi-creator network, Revelmode, in which he collaborated with several prominent YouTubers such as PewDiePie; his channel continued to grow during this time also, reaching a multi-million subscriber base. he was also featured among twenty-one other creators in the 2017 video game Fastlane. In July 2017, he joined the line-up for PlayersXpo alongside YouTubers Slogoman and iamSanna. In 2019 he won the Gaming Influencer of the Year Award at the Influencer Awards Monaco.

In January of 2017, Van Vucht, alongside Slogoman (Joshua Temple) and Kwebbelkop (Jordi Maxim), founded a now-dissolved company under the name "Robust Worldwide Limited" in the United Kingdom. In 2020, Van Vucht was a driver alongside Lando Norris on the McLaren F1 Team in the F1 Esports Virtual Grand Prix series for one race, replacing driver Carlos Sainz Jr.; the event was hosted by Silverstone.

In 2021, Van Vucht was appointed ambassador of Monaco Esports to help the organization expand its market gloablly. Van Vucht appeared on seasons two and three of the CBBC Show Game On Grandparents as a jury pro-gamer alongside Slogoman and Yammy. In 2023, Van Vucht attended VidCon in Anaheim, California, as a featured creator. In June 2026, Van Vucht was in MrBeast's "50 YouTube Legends Fight For $1,000,000" YouTube video. As of 2026, Van Vucht continues to upload, working as a full-time content creator.

== Personal life ==
Van Vucht has been dating YouTuber Sanna (iamSanna) since May 2014. As of

In 2026, Van Vucht resides in Monaco, with his girlfriend Sanna (iamSanna).

== Filmography ==
=== Television ===
Year	Title	Role	Notes	Ref
2022	Game on Grandparents	Himself	Appeared in 21 episodes	

=== Web series ===
Year	Title	Role	Notes	Ref
2023	Squid Island (Minecraft)	Himself	Creator, writer, director and actor	

=== Video games ===
Year	Title	Role	Notes	Ref
2015	Jelly Inc.	Himself (likeness)	Moblie game	

== Discography ==
Year	Title	Artist(s)	Notes	Ref
2015	Jelly Time	Jelly Van Dalen	Creator, writer, director and actor	
2017	GO GET GONE	Jelly	Distrack	
2018	CELEBRATION TIME	Jelly	Music video	
2023	I Want You Back	Jelly	Music video	
2026	New Town	Jelly	Music video	

== Awards and nominations ==
Year	Ceremony	Category	Result	Ref
2020	Shorty Awards	Best in Gaming	Nominated	

== See also ==
- List of YouTubers
