= Umrah and Ziyarah Forum =

Saudi Arabian Umrah and ziyarah conference

- Status: Active
- Genre: Tourism, Umrah services, hospitality, travel technology
- Frequency: Annual
- Locations: King Salman International Convention Centre, Madinah, Saudi Arabia
- Inaugurated: 22–24 April 2024
- Most recent: 30 March – 1 April 2026
- Attendance: 50,000 (2026)
- Organizer: Ministry of Hajj and Umrah; Pilgrim Experience Program; Tahaluf
- Website: umrah-ziyarah.com

The Umrah and Ziyarah Forum (Arabic: منتدى العمرة والزيارة) is an annual sector forum and exhibition held in Madinah, Saudi Arabia, organized by the Ministry of Hajj and Umrah in partnership with the Pilgrim Experience Program (Guests of Rahman Service Program). The forum serves as a platform for discussions on pilgrim services, technologies, partnerships, and visitor experience related to Umrah performers and visitors to the Two Holy Mosques.

The participants of the event include government entities, tourism organizations, travel operators, hospitality providers, transportation companies, technology firms, and financial service providers specializing in the Umrah and tourism.

== History ==
=== First edition (2024) ===
The inaugural Umrah and Ziyarah Forum was held from 22 to 24 April 2024 at the King Salman International Convention Centre in Madinah, under the theme "Enriching the Experience of Umrah Performers and Visitors". The event was organized by the Ministry of Hajj and Umrah in partnership with the Pilgrim Experience Program and included six discussion sessions and 24 workshops led by 29 specialists.

During the opening session, Minister of Hajj and Umrah Tawfig Al-Rabiah announced the launch of a contact centre providing services in nine languages for pilgrim inquiries.

The first edition featured several competitive programmes, including the Umrah AI Competition, the Labbaytum Award and a Historical and Enrichment Sites Hackathon linked to Al-sīrah al-nabawiyya (the biography of the Prophet Muhammad).

=== Second edition (2025) ===
The second edition was held from April 14 to 16, 2025, at the King Salman International Convention Centre in Madinah. Participation included 100 exhibitors representing government agencies, service providers, and nonprofit organizations from 100 countries.

The 2025 edition programmes included the Sustainable Solutions Challenge, the Historical Sites Hackathon, organized in partnership with Umm Al-Qura University, Awards in the Innovation Track for Umrah services, and the Labbaytum Award and the Creators Award for innovation.

=== Third edition (2026) ===
The third edition was held from 30 March to 1 April 2026 at the King Salman International Convention Centre in Madinah, under the patronage of Prince Salman bin Sultan Al Saud, the governor of Madinah. During the event, Prince Salman inaugurated the King Abdulaziz Foundation for Research and Archives' Historical Atlas of the Prophetic Biography and launched a naming initiative for neighborhoods and streets within the Rua Al Madinah project.

The 2026 edition featured over 150 exhibitors and drew more than 50,000 registrants from 165 countries and resulted in more than 5,400 agreements and memoranda of cooperation across government, private and non-profit entities. The knowledge programme comprised 25 main sessions and 40 workshops delivered by more than 160 speakers and trainers.
