= Haitham Abdulrahman Al-Ohali =

His Excellency Haitham Abdulrahman Al-Ohali
- هيثم العوهلي

Vice Minister of the Ministry of Communications & Information Technology (MCIT)
- Incumbent
- Assumed office June 2018
- Monarch: Salman
- Prime Minister: Salman (2017–2022); Mohammed bin Salman (2022–present)

Acting Governor of the Communications, Space and Technology Commission (CST)
- Incumbent
- Assumed office May 2025

Personal details
- Education: Seattle University

Haitham Abdulrahman Al-Ohali was born on 4 April 1976. He was appointed Vice Minister of Communications and Information Technology in 2018. He also serves as the Acting Governor and Vice Chairman of the Communications, Space, and Technology Commission (CST) from 9 May 2025. He held a number of senior management positions most notably chairing Cisco Saudi Arabia.

== Education ==
He holds a bachelor's degree in electrical engineering from Seattle University, United States in 1999.

== Career ==
- He was appointed Acting Governor and Vice Chairman of the Communications, Space, and Technology Commission (CST) on 9 May 2025. While also serving as Vice Minister of Communications and Information Technology.
- Appointed Vice Minister of Communications and Information Technology in 2018.
- Appointed as managing director in Cisco Saudi Arabia in June 2017.
- Prior to his joining to Cisco, he was appointed as Deputy general manager of the European Computer Driving Licence (ECDL) Foundation in Saudi Arabia between 2003 and 2006, where he advanced national digital literacy programs.
- He began his career as a Network Engineer at Motorola.
- Appointed Chairman of the Arab Satellite Communications Organization (Arabsat) in August 2021.
- A board member in the Saudi Authority for Intellectual Property (SAIP) in January 2022.

== Medals and honors ==
He was awarded the King Abdulaziz Medal (First Class) in June 2021.

== Read also ==
- Ministry of Communications and Information Technology (Saudi Arabia)
- Communications, Space and Technology Commission (Saudi Arabia)
- Mohammed Altamimi
