= Al Yah Satellite Communications =

Satellite communications company

Al Yah Satellite Communications Company
- Company type: PJSC
- Industry: Satellite communications
- Founded: January 2007; 19 years ago
- Defunct: 1 October 2024
- Successor: Space42 Plc
- Headquarters: Abu Dhabi, United Arab Emirates
- Area served: Africa; Eastern Europe; West Asia
- Key people: Dr. Bakheet Al Katheeri (Chairman); Tareq Al Hosani (Vice Chairman); Ali Al Hashemi (CEO)
- Products: Satellite Broadband Internet; Satellite Broadcast; Secure Satellite Connectivity
- Website: www.yahsat.com

Al Yah Satellite Communications Company P.J.S.C. (Yahsat) was a public company listed on the Abu Dhabi Securities Exchange (ADX) and a subsidiary of Mubadala Investment Company PJSC, which provided multi-mission satellite services in more than 150 countries across Europe, the Middle East, Africa, South America, Asia and Australia. The company offered voice, data, video and internet services for broadcast, Internet and VSAT users for both private and government organisations.

== Corporate history ==
Incorporated in January 2008, the company had an aim of developing, operating and using multipurpose (Government and commercial) communications satellite systems for the Africa, Europe and West Asia regions.

In July 2008, Yahsat approved a consortium of EADS Astrium and Thales Alenia to construct Yahsat's own satellites, whose manufacturing took 36 months to be completed in Europe. Arianespace were appointed to launch the first satellite Al Yah 1, currently positioned at 52.5° East.

In August 2008, Yahsat signed a 15-year lease agreement with the UAE Armed Forces to provide secure satellite communications in the UAE as Yahsat's first government customer. As part of this contract, Yahsat will supply the ground terminals and gateway infrastructure for satellite network services.

In August 2009, Yahsat entered into a partnership with European satellite operator SES to create a new company operating under the brand name YahLive, offering Direct-to-Home (DTH) television capacity and services to more than two dozen countries in the MENA region.

In December 2023, the company announced that it would be merging with Emirati firm Bayanat to form a new company Space42, pending regulatory and shareholder approvals.

In August 2024, in cooperation with Bayanat they launched the UAE's first SAR satellite that will enhance observations of Earth.

In October 2024, the company merged with Bayanat to form Space42 Plc.

== Yahsat satellites ==
The first satellite was launched from the Guiana Space Centre in Kourou, French Guiana on 22 April 2011.

A second satellite (Al Yah 2), weighing approx. 6 tons, has been launched by International Launch Services (ILS) on a Proton Breeze M vehicle from the Baikonour Kosmodrome in Kazakhstan on April 24, 2012, at 22:18 GMT.

	Al Yah 1	Al Yah 2	Al Yah 3
Contractor	EADS Astrium & Thales Alenia		Orbital ATK
Launch	22 April 2011	23 April 2012	25 January 2018
Orbital Location	52.5° E	47.5° E	20.0° W
Lifetime	15 Years		
Launcher	Ariane 5	ILS-Proton-M	Ariane 5 ECA
Capacity/Payload	C-band: 8 × 36 MHz + 6 × 54 MHz Transponders. Ku-band BSS: 25 × 33 MHz Transponders. Ka-band Military: 21 × 54 MHz Secure Transponders.	Ka-band Commercial: 25 × 110 MHz Transponders Ku-band BSS: 27 × 39 MHz Transponders. Ka-band Military: 29 × 57 MHz Secure Transponders.	Ka-band Commercial: 80 × 10 MHz Transponders Ka-band Military: 70 × 57 MHz Secure Transponders
