= Global Artificial Intelligence Summit & Awards =

Annual computer and electronics trade show

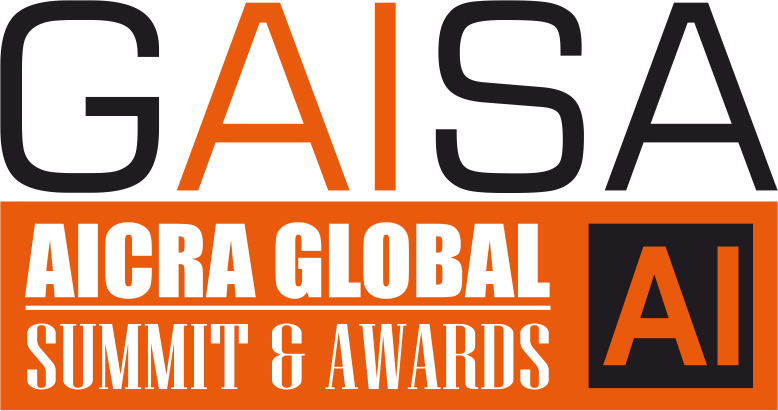
- Status: Active
- Genre: Artificial Intelligence, Technology
- Venue: Bharat Mandapam
- Locations: New Delhi, India
- Inaugurated: 2019
- Next event: 2025
- Organizer: All India Council for Robotics & Automation (AICRA)
- Website: gaisa.in

The Global Artificial Intelligence Summit & Awards (GAISA) is an international conference on Artificial Intelligence organized annually by AICRA. Since its inception in 2019, GAISA has been held at various locations each year. The 5th Edition of GAISA will be Scheduled on April 11-12, 2024, at Bharat Mandapam.

GAISA 2025 features a lineup of speakers which includes leading experts, researchers, and executives from top global tech companies. These speakers are involved with AI innovation, with expertise in areas such as machine learning, robotics, and ethical AI. Their diverse backgrounds span academia, industry, and entrepreneurship, offering unique insights into how AI is reshaping sectors like healthcare, finance, transportation, and more. Discussions focus on the future of AI, its societal impact, and the transformative potential of emerging technologies in solving complex global challenges.

Few Speakers are listed below:-

Shri Nitin Gadkari, Rao Inderjit Singh, Piyush Goyal, Admiral R Hari Kumar PVSM, AVSM, ADC, Samir V Kamat, Narayan Tatu Rane, Prof. K. Vijay Raghavan and many others.

== History ==
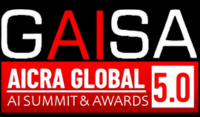
Logo used for 5th Edition of GAISA (GAISA 2025)

The conference was launched first in 2019 as Vigyan Bhawan New Delhi by AICRA with an objective of discussion and exploring artificial intelligence in engrossed sectors.
