= Ministry of Communications and Information Technology (Saudi Arabia) =

Government ministry of Saudi Arabia

Ministry of Communication and Information Technology

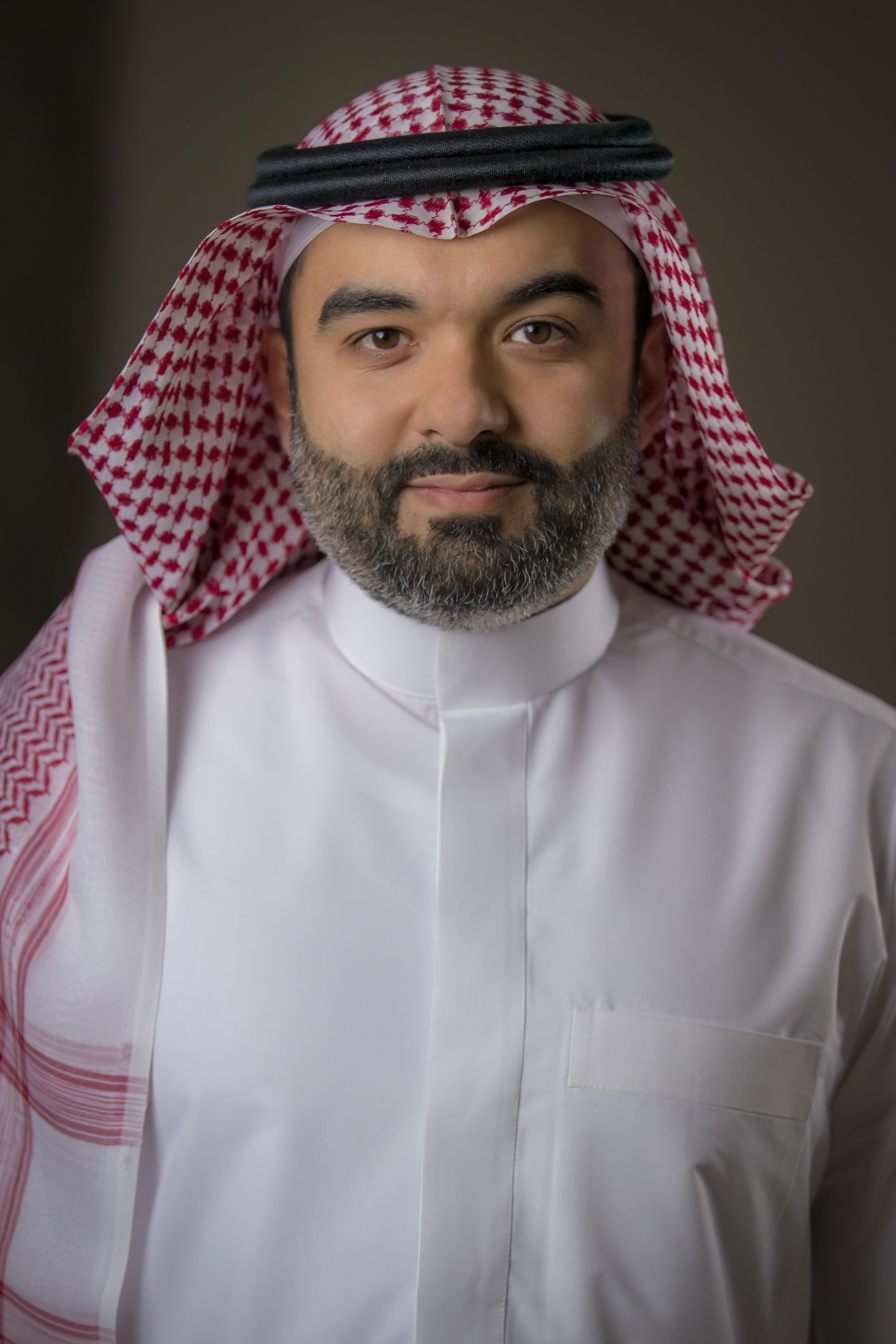
- Abdullah Alswaha, the current agency minister since 2017

Agency overview
- Formed: 1926
- Jurisdiction: Government of Saudi Arabia
- Headquarters: Riyadh, Saudi Arabia
- Minister responsible: Abdullah Alswaha
- Website: Official English Website

The Ministry of Communications and Information Technology (MCIT; Arabic: وزارة الاتصالات وتقنية المعلومات) is a Saudi government ministry that was established in 1926 and is responsible for the communications and information technology sector in the kingdom. The current minister of Communications and Information Technology is Abdullah Alswaha, wo was appointed on 23 April 2017.

== History ==
The earliest governmental entity to govern the communications and technology sectors was the Directorate of Post, Telephone and Telegraph (PTT) which was established in Makkah in 1926. In 1931, the telegraph services were provided by the first mobile wireless station imported by the Kingdom, followed by the introduction of telephone service In 1934. In 1953, responsibility for the telegraph, postal and telephone services was transferred to the newly established Ministry of Transport.

The rapid growth of telecommunications technology led to the establishment of the Ministry of Post, Telegraph, and Telephone in 1975 to be responsible for the telecommunications and posts sectors. In 2003, the ministry was renamed the Ministry of Communications and Information Technology.

== Responsibilities ==
The ministry's responsibilities include:

- The supervision over the communications and information technology sector and related activities.
- The development of policies that govern the communications and information technology sector.
- Designing plans for the communications and information technology sector.

== National programs ==
The ministry launched and supervised three national programs:

National Digitization Unit: Aims at ensuring the development of platforms for a digital society, digital economy and digital homeland.

Yesser: Was an e-Government Program aims at increasing the productivity and efficiency of the governmental sector by providing the required services and information.

National Center for Digital Certification (NCDC): This program provided systems for the infrastructure management of the public keys which an essential security technique for e-business, e-trade, and e-government over the internet. This program provided services such as issuing digital certificates, search for digital certificates, checking certificates and validity.

In 2021, the Saudi government approved the dissolution of the e-Government Programme (Yesser) and the National Centre for Digital Certification (NCDC). The Digital Government Authority assumed their regulatory responsibilities, while the National Information Centre took on certain operational functions.

== See also ==
- Ministries of Saudi Arabia
- Communications and Information Technology Commission (Saudi Arabia)
- .sa
- Abdullah Alswaha
- Mohammed Altamimi
- Haitham Abdulrahman Al-Ohali
