= Mobily =

Telecommunications company of Saudi Arabia

- Trade name: Etihad Etisalat Company
- Native name: موبايلي
- Type: Public
- Traded as: Tadawul: 7020
- ISIN: SA000A0DM9P2
- Industry: Telecommunications
- Founded: 14 December 2004; 21 years ago
- Headquarters: Riyadh, Saudi Arabia
- Area served: Saudi Arabia
- Key people: Sulaiman Abdulrahman Algwaiz (chairman); Salman Abdulaziz Albadran (CEO); Mohammed Kalil Ibrahim (CHRO); Khalid Abanami (CFO); Mohammad Shahid.(CBO)
- Services: Fixed line, Mobile phone, and Internet service provider
- Revenue: SAR 6.7 billion (30 June 2016)
- Operating income: SAR 284 million (30 June 2016)
- Net income: SAR 35.4 million (30 June 2016)
- Total assets: SAR 39.77 million (2022)
- Owners: Etisalat (27.99%); Shahid (11.85%)
- Website: mobily.com.sa

Mobily (Arabic: موبايلي), the trade name of Etihad Etisalat Company (Arabic: شركة اتحاداتصالات), is a Saudi Arabian telecommunications services company that offers fixed line, mobile telephony, and Internet services.

The company was established in 2004, and, in the summer of that year, won the bid for Saudi Arabia's second GSM licence. Mobily launched mobile services in Saudi Arabia on 5 May 2005, breaking Saudi Telecom's monopoly in the wireless business.

== History ==
Etihad Etisalat Co. was incorporated as a joint stock company under royal decree no. M/40 dated 18 August 2004. The company won the bid for Saudi Arabia's second GSM licence in the summer of 2004. The licence is valid for 25 years. Etihad Etisalat began its constituent activities on 14 December 2004 upon the publication of its incorporation.

United Arab Emirates firm Etisalat holds a 27.45% stake in the company, the General Organization for Social Insurance (GOSI) holds 11.85% and the rest is held by other investors and by public shares. Etihad Etisalat held an IPO in October 2004 that was massively oversubscribed (30 times). Police had to be called in to respond to unrest among investors fighting over application forms.

In December 2004, GSM described Mobily as the fastest growing mobile operator in the Middle East & North Africa. In 2006, Mobily reached more than 4,800,000 subscribers. As of 20 January 2007, Mobily had 6 million subscribers and 0.5 million 3G users.

Etihad Etisalat launched GSM mobile services under the brand name Mobily on 5 May 2005, breaking the Saudi Telecom Company's monopoly in the wireless business. The company had spent 6 months preparing for the launch, and acquired 1 million subscribers within the first 90 days of launch.

The company launched 3.5G services on 27 June 2006 and 4G services on 13 September 2011.

After 10 years of managing Mobily's services, in February 2021, Nokia extended its partnership with Mobily and signed a 3-year agreement that allows it to manage and maintain the radio and transport networks in Riyadh and other regions.

In May 2013, it was reported that Mobily is working on a way to intercept encrypted data sent over the Internet by Twitter, Viber, WhatsApp, and other mobile apps, and to bypass the protections built into the SSL and Transport Layer Security protocols.

In November 2024, it was announced that Mobily was partnering with Telecom Egypt, Egypt's primary telephone company, to launch the first Saudi-owned submarine cable linking Saudi Arabia and Egypt via the Egyptian Red Sea station.

In February 2025, at the LEAP 2025 tech conference in Riyadh, Mobily announced an investment of over $900 million into digital infrastructure, including data centers and submarine cables, to support demand for artificial intelligence (AI).

Mobily was ranked 42nd on Forbes Middle East's Top 100 Listed Companies 2025 list.

== Network technology ==
=== Radio frequency summary ===
Frequency range	Band number	Protocol	Class	Status	Notes
900 MHz E-GSM	8	GSM/GPRS/EDGE	2G	Active	
2100 MHz IMT	1	UMTS/HSPA/HSPA+/DC-HSPA+	3G	Active	
900 MHz E-GSM	8	UMTS/HSPA/HSPA+/DC-HSPA+	3G	Active	
2100 MHz IMT	1	LTE/LTE-A	4G	Active/Building out	
1800 MHz DCS	3	LTE/LTE-A	4G	Active/Building out	
800 MHz DD	20	LTE/LTE-A	4G	Active/Building out	
2500 MHz BRS	41	LTE/LTE-A	4G	Active/Building out	Band 38 available via MFBI.
3500 MHz C-Band	n78	NR	5G	Active/Building out	

== See also ==
- Bayanat Al Oula for Network Services
- Communication in Saudi Arabia
- Censorship in Saudi Arabia
