= Mo Gawdat =

Egyptian author (born 1967)

- محمد جودت
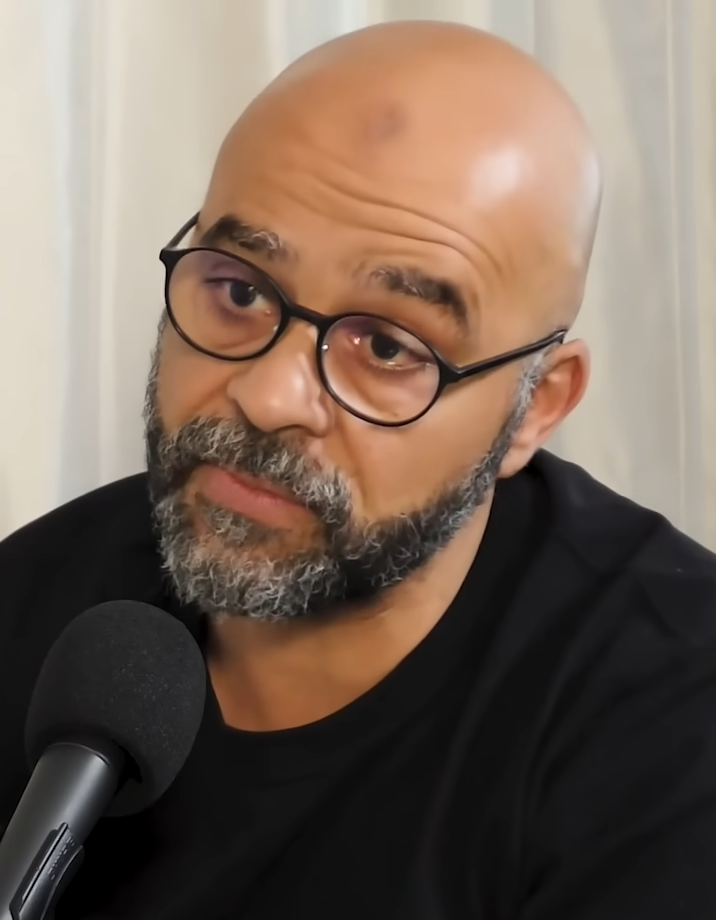
- Gawdat in 2022
- Born: 20 June 1967 (age 59)
- Education: Ain Shams University; Maastricht School of Management
- Occupation: Author
- Children: 2
- Website: mogawdat.com

Mohammad Gawdat (Arabic: محمد جودت; born 20 June 1967) is an Egyptian author and former technology executive. He previously served as chief business officer for Google X and is the author of the books Solve for Happy and Scary Smart.

== Early life ==
Gawdat was born in Egypt, the son of a civil engineer and an English professor. He showed an early interest in technology.

== Career ==
Gawdat studied civil engineering at Ain Shams University, graduating with a bachelor's degree in 1990. He went on to obtain an MBA from Maastricht School of Management in the Netherlands.

He began his career at IBM Egypt as a systems engineer, before moving to a sales role in the government sector. Moving to the United Arab Emirates, he joined NCR Abu Dhabi to cover the non-finance sector. At Microsoft, he held various roles over a span of seven-and-a-half years. He joined Google in 2007 and eventually rose to the position of chief business officer at Google X.

Gawdat is the author of Solve for Happy: Engineering Your Path to Joy (2017). Dedicated to his son Ali, who died in 2014, the book outlines methods for managing and preventing disappointment. In 2021, Gawdat published Scary Smart: The Future of Artificial Intelligence and How You Can Save Our World through Macmillan. In 2022, his next book, That Little Voice in Your Head: Adjust the Code That Runs Your Brain, was released by Macmillan. It presents suggestions for using the human brain optimally to thrive and avoid suffering. In 2024, Gawdat, along with co-author Alice Law, published Unstressable: A Practical Guide to Stress-Free Living.

== Personal life ==
Gawdat is separated from his wife, whom he met at university. They have a daughter as well as a son, who died in 2014 after an appendectomy.

== Publications ==
- Solve for Happy: Engineer Your Path to Joy (2017) ISBN 978-1501157585
- Scary Smart: The Future of Artificial Intelligence and How You Can Save Our World (2021) ISBN 978-1529077629
- That Little Voice in Your Head: Adjust the Code That Runs Your Brain (2022) ISBN 978-1529066142
- Unstressable: A Practical Guide to Stress-Free Living (2024) ISBN 978-1035022724
