= Communications, Space and Technology Commission =

Saudi communications authority

Coordinates: 24°44′12″N 46°38′3″E

Communications, Space and Technology Commission (CST)
- هيئة الاتصالات والفضاء والتقنية

Government agency overview
- Formed: 28 April 2001; 25 years ago
- Preceding Government agency: Saudi Communications Commission
- Headquarters: Riyadh, Saudi Arabia
- Government agency executives: Abdullah Alswaha, Chairman; Haitham Abdulrahman Al-Ohali, Governor
- Website: www.cst.gov.sa/en

The Communications, Space and Technology Commission (CST; Arabic: هيئة الاتصالات والفضاء والتقنية, Hai'at al-Ittisalat wa Tiqniyyat al-Ma`lumat) is a Saudi government entity with legal status and financial and administrative independence, it regulates telecommunications, Space, technology sectors, and digital content platforms, as well as manages the radio frequency spectrum in Saudi Arabia. The size of the telecommunications and technology market in the Kingdom for 2023 was 166 billion Saudi Riyals.

== CST Background ==
The Commission is linked to the history of telecommunications services in the Kingdom of Saudi Arabia, where in the year 1418 AH (1997/1998), telecommunications services were transferred from the Ministry of Post, Telegraph and Telephone to Saudi Telecom Company, and prepare the commission's by laws

Between the year 1421 and 1422 AH (2000/2001 and 2001/2002), the regulatory frameworks in Saudi Arabia were developed. The Telecommunications Act was issued, and the Communications commission was established with a legal status and financial and administrative independence after the Cabinet decree No. 74 in 5/3/1422 AH (28/5/2001). In the year 1423 AH (2002/2003), the work scope expanded with the beginning of sector privatization and presenting 30% of Saudi Telecom Company for IPO. The Commission tasks were expanded to include information technology, and it became known then as the (Communications and Information Technology Commission) "CITC".

During 1424-1429 AH (2003-2008), the Commission began to enhance the competitive environment by freeing and opening the mobile communications market. This included issuing the second and third licenses to (Mobily and Zain) companies. It also approved the National Plan for Frequency Spectrum and Numbering, established the Universal Service Fund, transferred internet services to the commission, and provided licenses to internet service providers.

The year 1440 AH (2018/2019) witnessed a giant leap in service quality. A cabinet resolution assigned the commission to take on the regulatory and supervisory responsibilities for the postal sector. This responsibility continued for four years, after which postal regulation was transferred to the Ministry of Transport in 1444 AH

In 1444 AH (2022/2023) a Cabinet resolution assigned the Space regulatory sectors to the Commission, and changed its title to (Communications, Space & Technology Commission) “CST”

== CST’s Roles & Responsibilities ==
=== Regulating Telecommunications Sector ===
The telecommunications sector is the first sector regulated by the Commission. As it is responsible for granting licenses for providing communication and internet services, enhancing competitiveness and supporting market growth, monitoring service providers and their compliance with regulations and standards, and taking regulatory measures that ensure fair competition and protection of users and all parties. It also conducts research, gathers statistics, and develops indicators on Saudi Arabia's telecommunications market performance and user behavior.

=== Regulating Space Sector ===
In 1444 AH, the Commission became the official regulator of Saudi Arabia's space sector, assuming responsibility for both oversight and business development. A notable milestone was the Commission’s involvement in organizing the May 21, 2023 mission that sent Saudi astronauts Ali Alqarni and Rayyanah Barnawi to the International Space Station. It also initiated its first regulatory activities by launching the Earth Observation (EO) platform service permit in 2024 .The Commission promotes economic growth in the space sector by supporting educational scholarships in space sciences, organizing startup competitions, and fulfilling its regulatory duties through licensing and policy development.

=== Regulating Technology Sector ===
The Commission regulates Saudi Arabia's technology market by licensing technology companies, establishing frameworks for emerging technologies, and compiling market statistics and key performance indicators. It also manages the regulatory sandbox for emerging technologies.

=== Managing Frequency Spectrum ===
Besides the three sectors that form its name, the Communications, Space and Technology Commission (CST) manages Saudi Arabia's national frequency spectrum. This includes developing the national frequency spectrum plan with relevant stakeholders, organizing and distributing frequencies at the national level for various radio services, issuing frequency licenses, coordinating internationally to ensure compatibility of frequencies with international regulations, monitoring spectrum usage, and handling wireless interference issues.

=== National Regulatory Roles ===
The Commission leads Saudi Arabia's digital regulatory agenda as chair of the National Regulations Committee, which coordinates regulatory bodies to accelerate the adoption of digital technologies throughout the economy, while focusing on the communications and information technology sector. The Commission has established the Digital Regulatory Academy (DRA) to develop national expertise in digital regulation. The Academy provides training to regulatory staff both within Saudi Arabia and abroad, as well as to employees of companies in sectors under the Authority's jurisdiction.

=== International Roles ===
The Communications, Space and Technology Commission (CST) represents Saudi Arabia in organizations, forums, and conferences related to its regulatory domains. Since 2023, it has held membership on the International Telecommunication Union Council (among 48 countries), in addition to its ITU membership (among 193 countries) since 1949. It also actively participates in ITU activities and working groups, including the World Telecommunication Standardization Assembly and the Radio Spectrum Advisory Group.

=== Mutasil Platform ===
Mutasil is a unified Electronic Services Platform for the Communications, Space & Technology Commission. The platform provides electronic services to individuals, establishments, and service providers.

== Achievements ==
Some of the Commission’s accomplishments:

- Achieved a Leading Position in the Digital Regulatory Maturity Index according to the ITU
- Established the first Cloud Computing Special Economic Zone
- Secured Saudi Arabia ranks 2nd among the G20 countries in the ITU’s ICT Development Index 2024 for the second consecutive year
- Implemented the unified charging port initiative for mobile phones and electronic devices, generating annual savings of 170 million SAR and reducing domestic consumption by 2.2 million units yearly
- Formed the first the First Space Entrepreneurship Alliance in Saudi Arabia
- Launched a collaborative initiative with the International Telecommunication Union (ITU) to create innovative solutions for bridging the global digital divide

== Read Also ==
- Ministry of Communications and Information Technology (Saudi Arabia)
- Abdullah Alswaha
- Mohammed Altamimi
- Haitham Abdulrahman Al-Ohali
