= Internet services technology =

Internet services technology is a broad field of study usually resulting in receiving an Associate of Applied Science Degree.

This two-year degree, often awarded at community colleges, is a gateway to more specialized studies, but can also be applied to immediate workforce demands.

== Areas of Study ==
Students learn languages such as HTML, C++, ActionScript, and JavaScript.

This program of study also encompasses business courses, with an emphasis on e-commerce and macroeconomics.

Internet services technology covers a broad range of technologies used for web development, web production, design, networking, and e-commerce.

This field also covers website maintenance, database management, and graphic design.
