= Kwebbelkop =

Dutch YouTuber (born 1995)

- YouTube logo
- Born: Jordi Maxim van den Bussche; 1 June 1995 (age 31); Amsterdam, Netherlands

Instagram information
- Page: Jordi van den Bussche
- Years active: 2013–present
- Followers: 1 million

TikTok information
- Page: Kwebbelkop
- Years active: 2019–present
- Followers: 3.4 million

Twitch information
- Channel: Kwebbelkop
- Years active: 2014–2018
- Genre: Video games
- Games: Grand Theft Auto V; Fortnite; Minecraft; Sims 4; Inside
- Followers: 51 thousand

X information
- Handle: @Kwebbelkop
- Display name: Kwebbelkop
- Years active: 2011–present
- Followers: 358 thousand

YouTube information
- Channels: Kwebbelkop; Kwebbelkop AI
- Years active: 2011–present
- Genre: Gaming
- Subscribers: 14.9 million
- Views: 7.05 billion
- Last updated: July 16, 2026

Jordi Maxim van den Bussche (born 1 June 1995), also known as Kwebbelkop, is a Dutch YouTuber. He is known for his Let's Play content of a variety of games, mainly Minecraft, Roblox, and Grand Theft Auto V. In 2021, he began phasing out his channel in favor of running the VTuber channel Bloo from the background. Eventually, in 2022, he debuted an AI version of himself on his main channel, garnering widespread backlash.

== Early life ==
Jordi Maxim van den Bussche was born on 1 June 1995, in Amsterdam, the Netherlands.

== Career ==
Kwebbelkop created his channel in April 2008, but he began uploading videos in 2011, starting with Call of Duty content. He created the collective Robust in 2014 with his friends and prominent YouTubers Jelly and Slogoman, moving in with them. He was also a part of PewDiePie's short-lived creator network. Kwebbelkop signed to marketing agency Kairos Media in 2017. In 2018, he released his own game, Impossible Runner, for PC and mobile. In 2019, he released another game with Dutch studio Webble Games. Called Havocado, it is similar to the party game Gang Beasts. He signed with BroadbandTV Corp in June of that year.

In April 2021, Kwebbelkop announced that he had invested millions of euros into a VTuber channel he created called Bloo. He had previously been posting daily for the past decade, but he decided to "sunset" his channel if Bloo's revenue surpassed his own. In December, he announced that he was replacing himself on his main channel with a VTuber. He explained that the change followed a long period of previous burnout where he commonly experienced twitchy eyes and back pain. He also left Robust in 2019 due to mental health issues. Kwebbelkop also stated that the VTuber can be molded to fit the needs of their audience. In August 2023, Kwebbelkop debuted an AI version of himself created from scratch using technology from his company, JVDBStudios. He claims it looks, sounds, and plays video games exactly like him. He had received much backlash on the decision, and argued persistently on Twitter. In October 2023, Kwebbelkop debuted the 2.0 version of his AI, with an AI version of himself instead of an avatar.
