= Integrated Telecom Company =

Telecom provider established in 2005

Salam Company شركة سلام
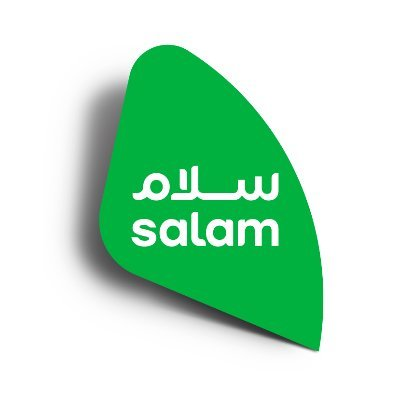
- Company type: Private
- ISIN: SA12QG53E519
- Industry: Telecommunications
- Founded: 2005
- Headquarters: Saudi Arabia
- Key people: Ahmed Al Anqari – CEO
- Products: Internet, FTTH, Connectivity, Satellite, and Cloud Computing
- Total assets: 947,731,000 Saudi riyal (2012)
- Number of employees: 600
- Website: http://www.salam.sa/

Integrated Telecom Company (Arabic: شركة الاتصالات المتكاملة), currently known by its trade name Salam (Arabic: شركة سلام), is a telecom provider established in 2005 offering broadband, interconnection and Satellite services for businesses, consumers and wholesale segments of the Saudi market.

In 2021, ITC rebranded to Salam, and the company is part of Mawarid Holding Group of Companies, a diversified Saudi conglomerate. The Group consists of 27 subsidiaries engaged in 4 major business areas, including media and communications, investment services, projects, and trading.

== Infrastructure ==
Salam owns Data Service Provider (DSP), Internet Service (ISP) and VSAT license, 6 data centers as well as an independent infrastructure that includes two International Cable Landing Stations in Al Khobar and Jeddah connecting the Kingdom to the rest of the world through submarine cables. These gateways are, in turn, connected to all cities in the Kingdom through a 17,000-kilometer Saudi National Fiber Network (SNFN).

In addition, Salam owns 10 metro-fiber rings spanning all major cities. These fiber optic rings are based on top-of-the-line SDH and DWDM technologies for data transfers, delivering local and international telecom services and helping ensure FTTx connectivity Kingdom wide.

== List of products and services ==
The following list of products are provided by Salam:

- Fiber Internet to the home FTTH
- 5G Internet
- Fixed Voice Services
- National Data Connectivity
- International Data Connectivity
- Satellite Services VSAT
- Internet Services
- Cloud computing
- Data center management
- Co-location
- Business Continuity Suite
- Managed Router

== ITC OFFICE gateway road ==
Integrated Telecom Company launched Saudi Executive Cloud to provide variety of value added Cloud services.

The Cloud products are:

- Virtual Private Server
- Backup as a Service (BaaS)
- Virtual Firewall
- Hosted MS Exchange
- Web Security
- Secure Email Gateway
- Web hosting
