= Mohammed Altamimi =

Saudi Arabian minister of Communications

- محمد بن سعود التميمي

the Governor of Saudi Arabia’s Communications, Space and Technology Commission
- Incumbent
- Assumed office October 2019
- Monarch: Salman
- Prime Minister: Salman (2017–2022); Mohammed bin Salman (2022–present)

Governor of Saudi Arabia’s Communications, Space and Technology Commission

Personal details
- Education: King Fahd University of Petroleum and Minerals (KFUPM), University of Strathclyde, Harvard University, University of Pittsburgh
- Occupation: government, Chairman

Mohammed Altamimi (Arabic: محمد بن سعود التميمي) is the Governor of Saudi Arabia's Communications, Space and Technology Commission (CST) since October 2019, on the Grade “Excellent”; and the acting CEO of the Saudi Space Agency (SSA) since 2021.

== Education ==
Mohammed Altamimi holds a bachelor's degree in Telecommunication Engineering from King Fahd University of Petroleum and Minerals (KFUPM) in 2003, and he received his Master's in Telecommunications and Technology Policy from the University of Strathclyde in 2005, and then his PhD in Telecommunications Regulation Economics from the University of Pittsburg in 2014. Dr. Altamimi has graduated from Harvard University's Program for Leadership Development in 2019 and published a number of academic and scientific peer-reviewed papers.

== Career ==
Prior to his appointment as the Governor of CST, Dr. Altamimi served as Deputy Governor for Regulation and Competition. Beside to his position, he worked as a member of arbitration committee for a number of international conferences, such as the International Conference on Cognitive Radio Oriented Wireless Networks and the European Telecommunication Networks Innovation Forum. He has been instrumental in the establishment of a number of specialized research societies in Saudi Arabia. During his PhD journey, he worked at several companies in the United States, chaired a number of projects on regulation governance, and ICT sector. Moreover, Altamimi is recognized as an expertise in governance, privatization public policies and regulations.

=== Achievements ===
- During his tenure, Saudi Arabia Achieved the second ranking in the UN's 2024 Digital Infrastructure report, and the sixth worldwide in ICT Regulation Quality.
- He led many initiatives, such as National Regulatory Committee and the Digital Regulatory Academy, that contributed to the Kingdom's efforts in achieving a leadership position in the digital regulatory maturity, through which the Kingdom jumped in many international indicators surpassing the G20 countries
- He was awarded the King Abdulaziz First Class Medal in 2021.
- Established and led the Saudi Astronaut Program, which sent the first Saudi female astronaut to the International Space Station in 2023.

== Additional Responsibilities and Affiliations ==
He also holds a number of national and international positions

- Vice Chairman of the board for CST
- Vice Chairman of the board for SSA
- Council Member at ITU in Geneva
- Commissioner at UN's Broadband Commission in New York
- Vice Chairman of the board for PIF's NEO Space Group
- Secretary Board of the Supreme Space Council
- Member of KAPSARC's Board of Trustees
- President of the National Regulations Committee
- Member of the E-Commerce Council
- Member of the Digital Content Council
- Board Member at the Riyadh Infrastructure Projects Center
