= Stc Group =

Saudi Arabian telecommunications company

Saudi Telecom Company
- Logo used since December 2019
- Trade name: stc Group
- Native name: شركة الاتصالات السعودية
- Type: Public; joint-stock company
- Traded as: Tadawul: 7010
- ISIN: SA0007879543
- Industry: Telecommunications
- Founded: 21 April 1998; 28 years ago
- Founder: Government of Saudi Arabia
- Headquarters: Riyadh, Saudi Arabia
- Area served: Saudi Arabia; Bahrain; Kuwait
- Key people: HRH Prince Mohammed K.A. Al-Faisal (Chairman); Yazeed Abd Al-Rahman Al Humied (Vice chairman); Olayan bin Mohammed Alwetaid (CEO)
- Products: Fixed-line; Mobile telephony; Internet services; IPTV
- Revenue: SAR 75.893 billion (2024)
- Net income: SAR 24.689 billion (2024)
- Total assets: SAR 160.638 billion (2024)
- Number of employees: 19,863
- Divisions: stc KSA; channels by stc; solutions by stc; specialized by stc; ccc by stc; sirar by stc; AQALAT; intigral; Telecom Towers Company Limited (TAWAL); stc Bank (stc pay); iot squared; center3; sccc by stc (Saudi Cloud Computing Company Alibaba Cloud)
- Subsidiaries: stc Kuwait; stc Bahrain; Maxis (62%); Telefónica (9.9%)
- ASN: 39386
- Website: www.stc.com

The Saudi Telecom Company, (Arabic: شركة الاتصالات السعودية); trading as stc Group, stylised as stc), provides ICT services in the Kingdom of Saudi Arabia, across the Middle East and Europe. The group offers landline and fixed infrastructure, mobile and data services, and broadband & cloud computing services. It also offers online payments, telecommunications, IOT, 5G, e-gaming, cybersecurity, digital entertainment, and fintech.

== History ==
Saudi Telecommunication Company (stc Group) was established as a Saudi joint-stock company on 21 April 1998 and began operations of telecommunications services throughout Saudi Arabia on 2 May 1998 as a wholly owned entity of the government of Saudi Arabia. The Saudi Telecommunication Company was a result of a privatization in Royal Decree No. M/35 by spinning off telecommunications owned by the government ministry Directorate of Post, Telephone and Telegraph.

The group received commercial registration as a Saudi Joint Stock Company on 29 June 1998 under registration No. 1010150269, and closed its initial public offering (IPO) in January 2003. On 11 April 2006, stc approved the increase of share capital from SR $15,000 million to SR $20,000 million through a transfer from the retained earnings to the capital.

The Saudi Digital Payments Company (stc bank) launched in 2017, with official work beginning in 2018.

In December 2019, the company launched a new identity, and the names of its branches in Bahrain and Kuwait were changed from VIVA to stc Kuwait and stc Bahrain. In June 2021, the Central Bank of Saudi Arabia approved the conversion of the Saudi Digital Payments Company (stc Pay) into a digital bank. The company replaced all its 3G networks with 5G in October 2021.

In 2021, Saudi Arabia's Public Investment Fund (PIF) sold 120 million shares in Saudi Telecom Company (stc Group) for $3.2 billion after completing a secondary share offering of stc Group.

In February 2022, it was announced that stc subsidiary, TAWAL, has acquired the Pakistani company, AWAL Telecom Private Limited - an independent passive telecommunications tower provider, for an undisclosed sum. AWAL was rebranded as TAWAL Pakistan.

In collaboration with Alibaba Group, the Alibaba Cloud was launched in May 2022. Center3, a new digital infrastructure assets company owned by stc Group, was launched in October 2022. The company also completed the first global 1.2T/channel trial in its DWDM optical network.

In February 2023, GO Telecom partnered with the company to provide IoT services throughout stc Group’s network. Microsoft and stc also expanded their partnership that same month to further advance digitalization across Saudi Arabia. It was announced in March 2023 that stc Group would provide the digital infrastructure for the Formula 1 Saudi Arabian Grand Prix, making it the company’s third consecutive year of partnership. Saudi Telecommunication Company's subsidiary TAWAL officially began operations in Europe in August of that year.

In September 2023, it was announced stc Group had acquired a 9.9% stake in the Madrid-headquartered multinational telecommunications company, Telefónica, S.A.. The deal was worth €2.1 billion - making stc Group the company’s largest shareholder.

== Investment funds ==
In 2017, the InspireU business accelerator was launched. Since the program’s inception, the InspireU accelerator has supported over 90 digital projects, with investments and financial transactions hitting a market value of $SAR 12 billion. Over 40 million users have benefited from InspireU’s projects.

In 2021, Saudi Arabia's Public Investment Fund (PIF) sold 120 million shares in Saudi Telecom Company (stc Group) for $3.2 billion after completing a secondary share offering of stc Group.

The STV Investment Fund, which invests in small and medium-sized companies in communications and information technology, was established in 2018.

In October 2021, stc Group launched 3 data centers in Riyadh, Jeddah, and Al-Madina with a $SAR 1 billion investment.

The company launched its corporate investment fund (CIF) in February 2023. CIF invests in early-stage startups in the cybersecurity, AI, digital gaming, IoT, and blockchain sectors.

As of May 2023, stc Group has invested over $SAR 3.5 billion in social, educational and health initiatives. Its ImpactU program has supported projects with a total value of $SAR 800,000. The program aims to incubate five startups annually and increase the initial investment for each to $SAR 100,000 to drive local economic growth.

== Operations ==
stc Group services are divided into four broad categories:

- Al-Jawal - Mobile network
- Al-Hatif - Landline network
- Solutions by stc - Internet services
- stc Bank - Digital payment & digital wallet first and largest fintech unicorn in the Middle East

stc Group also offers two content platforms:

- stc Play - Gaming and esports platform that allows users to participate in tournaments and access game exporters
- stc TV - Entertainment streaming service

In 2020, stc Pay earned its electronic money institute (EMI) license. Western Union soon after purchased 15% shares at a $1.3 billion valuation, making stc pay the first and largest fintech unicorn in the Middle East.

The group is currently operating as a conglomerate to manage all assets, subsidiaries and joint ventures by the Saudi Telecom Group. Mohammed K. A. Al Faisal is the current chairman.

== Awards and recognition ==
The company is a recipient of the GSMA T-ISAC Award 2024 for Recognition of Excellence and Leadership, whereas, Nauman Khan, Telecom Threat Management Lead Consultant at stc received the GSMA T-ISAC Individual Recognition Award 2024. These awards were presented at the GSMA Mobile World Congress (MWC) 2024 in Barcelona, Spain.

In 2025, STC Group ranked eighth on Forbes Middle East's Top 100 Listed Companies 2025 list.
