= Telecommunications in Angola =

Telecommunications in Angola include telephone, radio, television, and the Internet. The government controls all broadcast media with a nationwide reach.

In 2001, toward the end of Angolan Civil War, the government began adopting regulations to liberalize the telecom industry. This enabled private investments to revitalize the country's telecommunications infrastructure which had been severely damaged by the decades-long conflict. By 2012, Angola had one of the largest mobile telecom markets in sub-Saharan Africa and Internet access was growing steadily. The Ministry of Post and Telecommunications (MCT) oversees the telecommunications sector which is regulated by the Angolan National Institute of Telecommunication (INACOM).

== Infrastructure ==
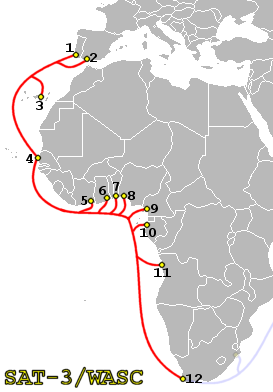
SAT-3 WASC route. Point 11 is Luanda, Angola.

- 29 satellite earth stations (2009).
- SAT-3/WASC fiber optic submarine cable provides connectivity to Europe and Asia.
- AngoSat 1, Angola's first communication satellite, built by RSC Energia with a credit from Rosoboronexport, launched in 2017.

Angola Telecom is one of twelve companies participating in the West Africa Cable System (WACS) consortium, a submarine communications cable running along the west coast of Africa and on to Portugal and the United Kingdom. The landing station for the older Sat3 cable, located at Cacuaco in Luanda, is operated by Angola Telecom.

Angola Cables is an operator of fiber optic telecommunication systems formed in 2009 by the major Angolan telecommunication companies, Angola Telecom (51%), Unitel (31%), MSTelcom (9%), Movicel (6%), and Mundo Startel (3%). On 23 March 2012 Angola Cables signed an agreement to participate in the construction of the South Atlantic Cable System (SACS) of about 6000 km length linking Fortaleza in Brazil with the Angolan capital Luanda. This cable is planned to be operational from the 2014 world football championship in Brazil.

ADONES (Angola Domestic Network System) consists of 1,800 kilometers of fiber-optic submarine cable linking eight Angolan coastal cities. About 70 percent of Angolans live close to the sea.

Other planned fibre optic cables to Angola include SAex and ACE.

== Telephone ==
- 303,200 fixed lines, 116th in the world, two lines per 100 persons (2011).
- 13 million mobile cellular lines, 65 lines per 100 persons (2011).
- International country code: 244.

Angola Telecom, the state-owned telecom, held a monopoly for fixed-line telephone service until 2005. Demand outstripped capacity, prices were high, and services poor. Telecom Namibia, through an Angolan company, became the first private licensed operator in Angola's fixed-line telephone network. By 2010, the number of fixed-line providers had expanded to five; Angola Telecom established mobile-cellular service in Luanda in 1993 and the network has been extended to larger towns. A privately owned, mobile-cellular service provider began operations in 2001. HF radiotelephone is used extensively for military links.

== Radio ==
- 21 AM, 6 FM, and 7 shortwave radio broadcast stations (2001)
- 630,000 radios (1997)

The state-owned Radio Nacional de Angola (RNA) broadcasts on 5 stations. Roughly a half dozen private radio stations broadcast locally.

== Television ==
- 6 television broadcast stations (2000)
- 150,000 televisions (1997)

The state-owned Televisão Pública de Angola (TPA) provides terrestrial TV service on two channels and a third TPA channel is available via cable and satellite. TV subscription services are also available.

== Internet ==
- Internet hosts: 20,703 hosts, 116th in the world (2012).
- Internet users: 3,058,195 users, 78th in the world; 16.9% of the population, 151st in the world (2012).
- Fixed broadband: 27,987 subscriptions, 124th in the world; 0.2% of the population, 162nd in the world (2012).
- Mobile broadband: 5.000.000 subscriptions. 2015.
- Top level domain name: .ao.

First introduced in 1996, the Internet reached a penetration rate of 16.9 percent in 2012, up from just over 3 percent in 2007, according to the International Telecommunication Union (ITU). Fixed-line broadband subscriptions, however, remain low with a penetration rate of only 0.2 percent in 2012, and are largely concentrated in the capital city, Luanda, due to the country's high poverty rate and poor infrastructure in rural areas. Mobile Internet access is higher at 1.5% and access to mobile phones is much higher with a penetration rate of 49% in 2012.

In June 2012, Unitel launched a project in partnership with the education ministry and Huawei to provide free Internet access for secondary school students in both public and private schools across the country's 18 provinces. Known as “E-Net,” the project aims to benefit over 18,000 students with computers supplied by Huawei and Internet access provided by Unitel.

Citizens have increasingly taken to the Internet as a platform for political debate, to express discontent with the country's current state of affairs, and to launch digital activism initiatives. Similar to many other African countries, Angolan youth have embraced social media tools and used them to fuel protest movements across the country. The positive impact of digital media tools in Angola was particularly noticeable during the August 2012 parliamentary elections when the Internet was used in innovative ways to advance electoral transparency. For example, citizens were able to report electoral irregularities in real time, while the National Electoral Commission used the Internet and iPads to scan voter registration cards.

Internet access in Angola is provided by various telecommunications companies and private ISP's.

Telecommunication companies:

- Angola Telecom, the state-owned telecommunications provider
- Itelnet
- MS Telcom, Sonangol owned provider, main focus on oil and gas sector
- Startel

Internet Service Providers:

- ACS
- Cablelink - Telecomunicações, Lda - Specialises in corporate Pay-when-you-use telecommunication services.
- cmcinternet covers majority of luanda and other areas with VSAT technologies
- ITA - Internet Technologies Angola, privately owned with a focus on corporate services
- Multitel, corporate focused ISP, subsidiary of Angola Telecom
- MVcomm
- NetOne, residential WiMAX services
- TSOLNETWORKS - Corporate Internet Service Provider focusing on Value Added Solutions
- TV-Cabo, residential TV and Internet services, subsidiary of Angola Telecom
- Vizocom

=== Internet censorship and surveillance ===
The constitution and law provide for freedom of speech and press, however, state dominance of most media outlets and self-censorship by journalists limits these rights in practice. In its Freedom on the Net 2013 and Freedom on the Net 2014 reports, Freedom House rates Angola's "Internet freedom status" as "partly free".

There are no government restrictions on access to the Internet. And aside from child pornography and copyrighted material, the government does not block or filter Internet content and there are no restrictions on the type of information that can be exchanged. Social media and communications apps such as YouTube, Facebook, Twitter, and international blog-hosting services are all freely available. There are no issues of intermediary liability for service or content providers, nor are there known instances of take-down notices issued for the removal of online content. The government does deliberately take down its own content when it wants to prevent the public from accessing certain government information.

Censorship of traditional news and information sources is common, leading to worries that similar efforts to control online information will eventually emerge. Defamation, libel, and insulting the country or president in "public meetings or by disseminating words, images, writings, or sound" are crimes punishable by imprisonment. A proposed "Law to Combat Crime in the Area of Information Technologies and Communication" was introduced by the National Assembly in March 2011. Often referred to as the cybercrime bill, the law was ultimately withdrawn in May 2011 as a result of international pressure and vocal objections from civil society. However, the government publicly stated that similar clauses regarding cybercrimes will be incorporated into an ongoing revision of the penal code, leaving open the possibility of Internet-specific restrictions becoming law in the future. The proposed law would have increased penalties for offenses in the criminal code when the offenses were committed using electronic media. The proposed law would have given authorities the ability to intercept information from private devices without a warrant and to prosecute individuals for objectionable speech expressed using electronic and on social media. Sending an electronic message interpreted as an effort to "endanger the integrity of national independence or to destroy or influence the functionality of state institutions" would have yielded a penalty of two to eight years in prison, in addition to fines.

An April 2013 news report claimed that state security services were planning to implement electronic monitoring that could track email and other digital communications. In March 2014, corroborating information from military sources was found, affirming that a German company had assisted the Angolan military intelligence in installing a monitoring system at the BATOPE base around September 2013. There was also evidence of a major ISP hosting a spyware system.

== See also ==
- Human rights in Angola
- Media in Angola
