= SAex =

Proposed submarine communications cable

SAex (South Atlantic Express Cable)
- Cable type: Fibre-optic
- Fate: Planned
- Construction beginning: 2019
- First traffic: 2021 (planned)
- Design capacity: 108 TBit/s
- Landing points: Mtunzini, South Africa; Yzerfontein, South Africa; Saint Helena, British overseas territory of Saint Helena, Ascension and Tristan da Cunha; Fortaleza, Brazil; Virginia Beach, United States
- Area served: South Africa, Namibia, Saint Helena and Brazil
- Owner(s): SAEx International Ltd
- Website: www.saex.net

SAex (South Atlantic Express) is a proposed submarine communications cable linking South Africa to the United States with branches to Namibia, Saint Helena, and Brazil.

The project was announced in 2011 by eFive Telecoms (Pty) Ltd, who led the project during the early feasibility studies. In November 2013 South Atlantic Express Cable Company (Pty) Ltd took over responsibility and was renamed to SimplCom South Africa (Pty) Ltd after SimplCom Inc. (Canada) acquired a controlling shareholding in the former.

In April, 2011 the Bank of China announced that it was interested in investing 60% of the funds required for the project while the Industrial Development Corporation of South Africa also had expressed interest in providing funding. In June 2011 the project was expected to cost R3 billion to complete. A revised configuration (cable branch to Namibia instead of Angola, additional branch to Saint Helena, and four instead of three fibre pairs), technological improvements and lower costs of technology are expected to reduce the projected capacity prices of the original design. As of May 2014 the project had funding interest from numerous private and public financial institutions.

As of October 2018, desktop surveying had begun.

== Overview ==
Proposed route

SAEx is conceived as a system to link the developing economies of southern Africa and South America independently of traditional hubs and so to contribute to a link between BRICS economic regions without recourse to traditional northern hemisphere hubs. It will also form a sub-sea route from Indian Ocean network nodes in the Gulf region, India and Eastern Asia to South America and the USA while avoiding geological and geopolitical hazards present on other paths, such as the oceanic trenches of the Pacific Ocean, the Red Sea, the Suez Canal and the Mediterranean Sea and transits through potentially unstable countries and unreliable overland transit networks. Currently, internet traffic bounded from South Africa to the Americas routes through Europe. The SAex cable if constructed, will reduce latency and bandwidth costs associated with the distance that internet traffic currently has to travel by providing the shortest route possible from South Africa to the Americas. The initial design capacity of the cable is 40 TBit/s and will be over 10,000 kilometres in length (7,400 km from South Africa to Brazil and 3,000 km from Cape Town to Mtunzini). It will consist of four fibre pairs, each capable of carrying 10 TBit/s of data using 100 GBit/s wavelength technology. The branch to Namibia will stretch over 1,050 km while that to Saint Helena will have a length of less than 50 km.

According to a memorandum of understanding closed in April 2010 Main One and SEACOM will interconnect their cables with SAex and so form a pan-African fibre-optic ring. Through SEACOM the cable could also supply India with bandwidth towards the Americas by onward connectivity to the United States through the existing GlobeNet cable system.

At Yzerfontein SAEx would be able to interconnect to WACS while at Mtunzini SAFE, EASSy and SEACOM could provide onward connectivity to Asia, East Africa and India.

The cable system was expected to be operational in 2020 (originally by mid-2014, later 2017).

== Campaign to connect St. Helena ==
There were originally no plans to land the cable and install a landing station in Saint Helena. If this were done, however, the cable could supply the island's population with sufficient bandwidth to fully leverage the benefits of today's information society. Since January 2012 a campaign called Move This Cable launched by A Human Right, a San Francisco-based NGA working on initiatives to ensure all people are connected to the Internet, has been lobbying for a branch of the SAex cable to land on the remote island of Saint Helena in order to provide high-speed Internet access to the island's small population of 4,200 people and so to foster socio-economic development. On October 6, 2012, eFive agreed to reroute the cable through Saint Helena after successful lobbying efforts. Islanders have sought the assistance of the UK Department for International Development and Foreign and Commonwealth Office in funding the £10m required to install a branch from an underwater OADM branching unit on the main cable to the island. The UK Government have announced that a review of the island's economy would be required before such funding would be agreed to. On 27 October 2017 St Helena Government announced that it had signed a memorandum of understanding for a branch from the SAex cable to the island to be delivered in early 2020 which would be largely funded by the European Development Fund.

== Parallel projects ==
In November 2011 former eFive CEO Mulaudzi stated that having the first-mover advantage was vital for the project since there is no need for two separate cable systems connecting Angola with Brazil. On Friday, 23 March 2012, the president of Angola Cables, António Nunes and the president of Telebrás, Caio Bonilha, signed a deal to construct a cable of about 6000 km length linking Fortaleza in Brazil with the Angolan capital Luanda named South Atlantic Cable System (SACS). IHS Global Insight lists four concurrent projects to lay new undersea cables between South America and Africa. Due to this competing project, in 2014, the SAex' design was modified to now include a branch to Namibia instead of a dedicated fiber pair running from Fortaleza to Angola forking off mid-Atlantic. In September 2018 Angola Cables announced that the SACS cable was on-line and ready to begin commercial operation.

== Landing points ==
=== Current planning ===
As of October 2017 the SAex is planned to land at the following locations:

- Mtunzini, South Africa
- Yzerfontein, South Africa
- Saint Helena, British overseas territory of Saint Helena, Ascension and Tristan da Cunha (spur from OADM branching unit with one fiber pair)
- Fortaleza, Brazil
- Virginia Beach, United States

=== Original planning ===
- Mtunzini, South Africa
- East London, South Africa
- Port Elizabeth, South Africa
- Melkbosstrand, South Africa
- Saint Helena, British overseas territory of Saint Helena, Ascension and Tristan da Cunha (since mid-2012)
- Cacuaco, Angola (proposed)
- Fortaleza, Brazil

== Maps ==
Route of the SAex submarine cable as planned in 2017

Route of the SAex submarine cable as planned in 2014

Route of the SAex submarine cable as planned in mid-2012

Route of the SAex submarine cable as planned in late 2011

A map showing the active submarine cables servicing the African continent with the green line representing the SAex cable system. The width of each line is proportional to the design capacity of each cable (from 2011).

== See also ==
- SACS (cable system)
- SEACOM
- WACS (cable system)
