= Neotel =

Fixed line telecommunication company in South Africa

- Formerly: SNO Telecommunications
- Company type: Private company
- Traded as: Neotel
- Industry: Communications Services
- Founded: 31 August 2006
- Defunct: June 2016
- Fate: Acquired by Liquid Intelligent Technologies
- Successor: Liquid Intelligent Technologies
- Headquarters: Midrand, South Africa
- Area served: South Africa
- Products: Telecommunications; Wireless and Wireline Broadband Services; Managed Services
- Website: neotel.co.za at the Wayback Machine (archived 2015-03-15)

Neotel, formerly SNO Telecommunications, was the second national operator (SNO) for fixed line telecommunication services in South Africa. It was unveiled on 31 August 2006 in Kyalami in Midrand. Neotel is South Africa's first direct telecommunications competitor to the current telecommunications parastatal, Telkom.

The new company announced its business services on 15 November 2007 and its consumer services in May 2008. Its business services include local and international leased line services, as well as a suite of voice, data (VPN), and Internet offerings delivered over its converged, next-generation network. International Transit services for wholesale customers have been available since September 2006. They plan to use wireless broadband technologies, amongst others, which not only allows data transfers but also voice in the form of VOIP.

The arrival of a competitor was said to bring competitive pricing in terms of high speed internet (avg. 250 kbit/s to 750 kbit/s CDMA2000), broadband through WiMax, and later high speed broadband (xDSL and Fibre).

In 2017, Neotel was acquired by Liquid Intelligent Technologies.

== History ==
In 2001, an amendment to the Telecommunications Act was made that allowed for the creation of a competitor to South Africa's largest telecommunications operator, Telkom. The initial shareholders of the Second National Operator (SNO) were identified as Eskom and Transnet. In early 2002, bidding started for the remaining stakes in the SNO. The Shareholder's agreement was signed on 15 August 2005. Following the signing, the licence terms and conditions were finalized in March 2006, and the company officially launched in August 2006.

In May 2014 a buyout offer of ZAR 7 Billion from cellular network Vodacom was accepted by shareholders of both companies. Even though regulatory approval by the Independent Communications Authority of South Africa was obtained in 2015, the deal ultimately collapsed in March 2016, after competitors successfully challenged the transfer of Neotel's licenses and spectrum in court.

In June 2016, Tata Communications announced that it had sold its stake in Neotel to Liquid Telecom, which is majority owned by Econet Wireless Global, for US$428 million.

== Shareholding ==
Neotel currently consists of the following consortium:

Initial holdings by Eskom Holdings (15%), Transtel, a division of Transnet (15%) and Two Consortium (12.5%) sold to Tata Communications of India in 2009 and 2011, raising their stake from 26% to 68.5%, making them the majority shareholder within Neotel. In 2017, the company was acquired by Liquid Intelligent Technologies.

- Liquid Telecom (70%);
- Royal Bafokeng Holdings (BEE partner) (30%).

== Products ==
Neotel launched their consumer products in 2008.

- Cloud Security
- Managed and Transformation Services
- Managed UTM
- N2 Educational Hub
- NeoBroadband
- NeoCarrier
- NeoCarrier Last Mile Access
- NeoCarrier Metro
- NeoCarrier NLD
- NeoConference
- NeoConference Video
- NeoCorporate Onnet
- NeoFax
- NeoGO
- NeoHost Colocation & Managed Host
- NeoHosted Contact Centre
- NeoIntellect
- NeoInternet
- Neo IP Transit
- NeoIRU
- NeoLan
- NeoLink
- NeoLink Global
- NeoManaged PBX
- NeoMetroLink
- NeoMulti site Breakout
- NeoNetworks Project Implementation
- NeoOne-Host Colocation & Managed Host
- NeoOne-Internet
- NeoOne-Last Mile Access
- NeoOne-Layer 2
- NeoOne-Voice
- NeoOne-VPN
- NeoPOIL
- NeoPresence
- Neo Professional Services
- NeoSAT
- NeoSMS
- NeoTransnet
- NeoVAS
- NeoVoice
- NeoVoice Wholesale
- NeoVPN
- Video Connect
- Virtual Host

=== NeoConnect ===
NeoConnect is an EV-DO based service and is available in two primary versions. All versions include a phone that includes support for Short Message Service (SMS) and voice calls. NeoConnect Lite is a low speed (up to 156 kbit/s) internet connectivity product. It has data cap options ranging between 2 GB and unlimited. NeoConnect Prime is a medium to high speed (up to 2.4 Mbit/s) product with data caps of between 2.5 GB and unlimited.

==== Limitations ====
- Neotel's products are currently only available in limited areas (Johannesburg, Durban, Cape Town, Port Elizabeth and Pretoria)
- The phone only has a USB connection and does not provide a connection compatible with devices meant to connect to phone lines, such as fax machines.
- Latency is variable, making the connection unsuitable for online gaming, VoIP and other jitter sensitive applications.

== International connectivity ==
As a wholesale telecommunications provider, and to support its own services, Neotel is involved in a number of submarine communications cables that will increase South Africa's international connectivity between 2009 and 2011. Currently (prior to June 2009), Neotel offers international services that make use of SAT-3 and SAFE. It manages the landing station in South Africa for SEACOM, which was commissioned for operation on 23 July 2009, and is a participant in EASSy, and WACS.

== See also ==
- Hellkom
- MyADSL
- Telkom (South Africa)
- WACS
