= Equiano (submarine communications cable) =

Submarine cable connecting Europe to Africa

- Owners: Google
- Landing points: 1. Sesimbra, Portugal; 2. Lomé, Togo; 3. Lagos, Nigeria; 4. (Saint Helena) Ruperts, St Helena; 5. Swakopmund, Namibia; 6. Melkbosstrand, South Africa
- Total length: 15,000 km
- Design capacity: 144 Tbit/s
- Date of first use: 2022

Equiano is a private transatlantic communications cable that connects western Europe (Portugal) with southern Africa (Melkbosstrand, South Africa). Branching points along the way connect to Togo, Nigeria, the island of St. Helena and Namibia.

The cable was announced by Google in June 2019 and was originally due to go live in 2021. After delays due to COVID-19 and other issues, Equiano was eventually launched by Google in September 2022, having reached its final destination of South Africa. SEACOM began services on the cable in March 2023.

== History ==
In June 2019, Google announced that it would be investing in another private international subsea cable — Equiano — its third private subsea cable after Curie (completed in 2019), and Dunant (completed in 2020). The cable, linking Europe with western and southern Africa, was named for Olaudah Equiano, a writer and abolitionist born in present-day Nigeria.

The cable was built and laid by Alcatel-Lucent Submarine Networks (ASN).

Equiano is viewed as part of Google’s five-year, $1 billion plan that aims to boost digital services across Africa. According to the managing director for Google in Africa, Nitin Gajria, Equiano's capacity is roughly 20 times more network capacity than the last cable built to serve the west coast of Africa. An October 2021 report commissioned by Google also claimed that the cable could create up to 1.6 million jobs due to a drop in data prices, and subsequent expansion of the digital economy.

The first connections to Equiano connecting South Africa with Portugal were due to go live in 2021 but were subsequently delayed by COVID-19 and other factors until the end of 2022. The cable landed in Togo on Friday 18 March 2022. The first shore landing was on Saint Helena in 2021, making it the first undersea cable to connect the island to the Internet, which previously only used satellite links. Google and cable landing partner WIOCC announced the landing of Equiano subsea cable at Lagos, Nigeria on 21 April 2022. The Equiano subsea cable landed at California Beach near the cable landing station at Sesimbra, Portugal on May 25, 2022. The cable landed in Namibia on 1 July 2022. Finally, the Equiano subsea cable landed at the Melkbosstrand Cable Landing Station about 35 km north of Cape Town, South Africa on 8 August 2022.

== Partners ==
The West Indian Ocean Cable Company (WIOCC) is a key partner in Equiano, owning a full fibre pair on the system. WIOCC owns and manages its own submarine line terminating equipment, enabling it to light and upgrade its capacity to meet the needs and demands of its clients on demand.

WIOCC’s Equiano capacity will interconnect with terrestrial infrastructure providers, cloud networks, and other partners and suppliers via new Open Access Data Centres (OADC - a WIOCC Group company) in Rondebosch, Cape Town.

Liquid Telecom, part of the Casavatech group is another partner owning a full fibre pair.

== Specifications ==
The Equiano cable consists of 12 fibre pairs (24 fibres) of 12 Tbit/s each (144 Tbit/s total). Its operation is based on space-division multiplexing (SDM) technology, first deployed on the Dunant cable. Rather than repeaters being dedicated to a single fibre pair, SDM allows them to be shared amongst fibres and allows improved optical switching, which is designed to provide flexibility in how capacity is allocated across Africa. This technology was developed in co-operation with SubCom, who implemented SDM on the Dunant cable.

== See also ==
- Dark fibre
- Submarine communications cable
- Transatlantic communications cable
