= Angola Cables =

Angolan telecommunications operator

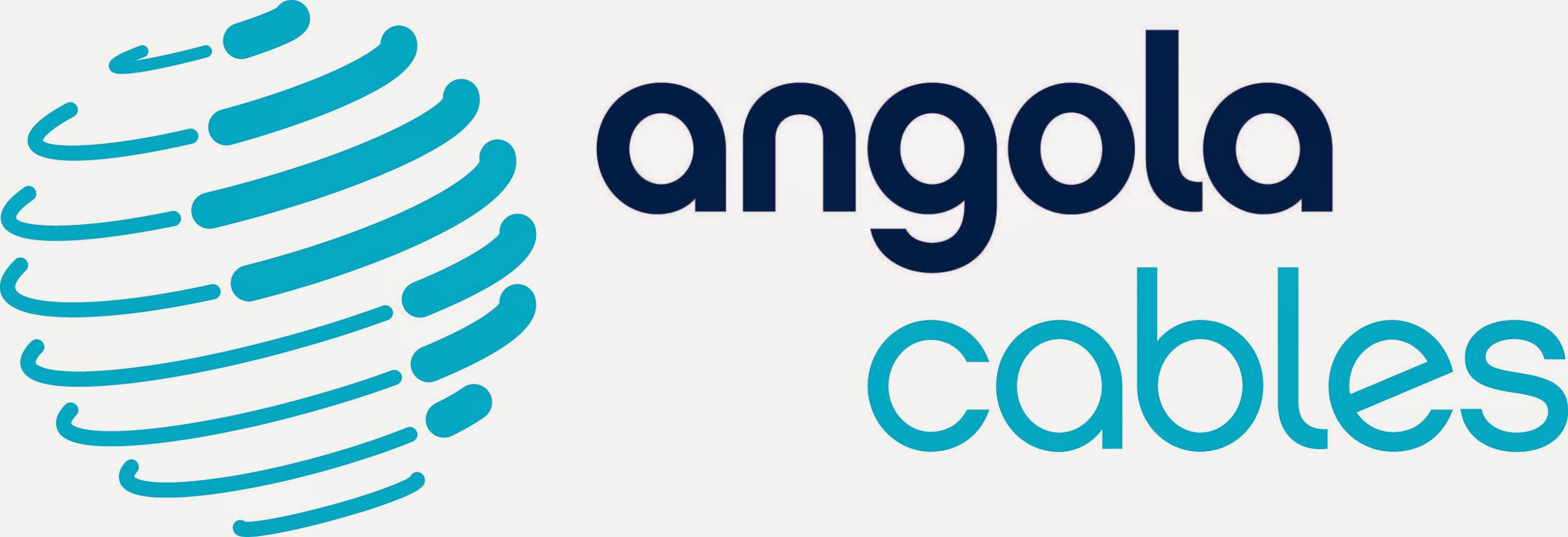
- Industry: Telecommunications
- Founded: 2009; 17 years ago
- Headquarters: Sangano, Angola
- Owners: Angola Telecom, Unitel, MSTelcom, Movicel, Startel
- Website: www.angolacables.co.ao/en/

Angola Cables is an internationally established ICT and network services provider. The company specializes in connectivity technologies for the wholesale market and offers digital services across multiple industries, including cloud resources for the corporate enterprise sector.

Angola Cables operates a global backbone network, providing access to major IXPs, Tier I operators, and global content providers. With more than 30 POPs and connections to 66 interconnected Data Centres and 6000 peering agreements, traffic over its international network is in excess of 18 500 Tbps.

The company has its own submarine cable network spanning over 33,000 kilometres (WACS, SACS, and MONET) and extends its services to over 50,000 kilometres through partner cables, connecting the Americas, Africa, Europe, and Asia.

Additionally the company operates two Data Centres, AngoNAP Fortaleza in Brazil and AngoNAP Luanda in Angola. Angola Cables also manages PIX in Brazil and AngonIX in Angola - one of the leading internet traffic exchange points in Africa that directly connects to over 21 IXPs worldwide.

Angola Cables is expanding its operations into markets such as Brazil, South Africa, the United States, Nigeria, and Portugal. The company promotes intercontinental interconnection, driving digital and economic development, and ranks among the top 25 internet service providers in the world today.

In July 2019, Angola Cables launched a cloud service that utilizes their cable system connecting Brazil, the US, and Angola.

== See also ==
- Telecommunications in Angola
- WACS (cable system)
- SACS (cable system)
