= SACS =

SACS may refer to:

- SACS, a finite element analysis software by Bentley Systems
- SACS (gene), a human gene that encodes the protein Sacsin
- The South Atlantic Cable System, a transoceanic submarine communications cable
- Saint Alphonsus Catholic School, a Catholic School found at Lapu-Lapu City, Cebu, Philippines
- St Andrew's Cathedral School, an Anglican school in Sydney, Australia
- The South African College Schools, a school in Cape Town, South Africa
- The Southern Association of Colleges and Schools, an educational accreditation body in the southern United States
- Success Academy Charter Schools
- Southwest Allen County Schools, a school district in Indiana
- Structural Analysis of Cultural Systems, an NGO
- Suzuki Advanced Cooling System, used in some Suzuki motorcycle engines

== See also ==
- Sacs, an alternate name for the Sauk, a native American people
