= West Indian Ocean Cable Company =

WIOCC
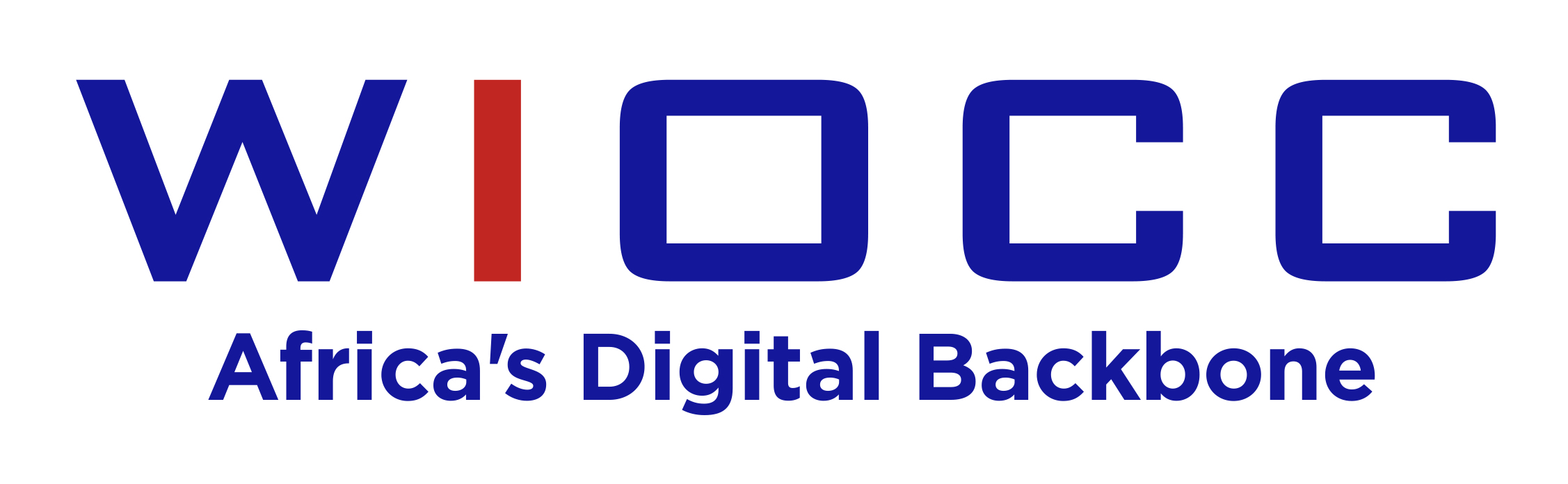
- Type: Private
- Industry: Telecommunications
- Founded: 2007
- Headquarters: Ebene, Mauritius
- Key people: , CEO. Mohamed Jama, Chairperson.
- Products: Global connectivity, IP Transit, Metro Connect, ISP Transit, Colocation
- Number of employees: 100+
- Website: https://wiocc.net/

West Indian Ocean Cable Company (WIOCC) operates as a wholesaler, providing capacity to international telecoms, cloud operators, content providers and internet service providers within and out of Africa. WIOCC offers carriers connectivity to over 550 locations across 30 African countries – utilising more than 75,000 km (47,000 mi) of terrestrial fibre and 200,000 km (120,000 mi) of submarine fibre-optic cable. WIOCC's international network reach currently extends to 100 cities in 29 countries in Europe and more than 700 cities in 70 countries globally.

The company was established in 2008 and is jointly owned by 14 major African telecom operators, with support from five international development financial institutions: International Finance Corporation (IFC), African Development Bank (AfDB), French Development Bank (AFD), German Development Bank (KfW) and European Investment Bank (EIB).

WIOCC's CEO (from October 2008 – Present) is Chris Wood. WIOCC is registered in the Republic of Mauritius with offices in Nairobi, Kenya and Johannesburg, South Africa.

== Shareholders ==
WIOCC is jointly owned by African Capital Alliance (ACA), a leading African-focused investment firm, International Finance Corporation (IFC) the largest global development institution focused on the private sector in developing countries and ten major African telcos, all leading operators in their respective markets. The telcos are;

- Botswana Fibre Networks - Botswana
- Dalkom Somalia
- Djibouti Telecom
- Zantel - Tanzania
- TelOne - Zimbabwe
- ONATEL - Burundi
- TMCEL
- Telkom Kenya
- Uganda Telecom
- Lesotho Communications Authority

== Network ==
=== Eastern Africa Submarine Cable System (EASSy) ===
WIOCC is the largest shareholder in EASSy owning 28% of the capacity, a >10 Tbit/s capacity submarine fibre-optic cable system interconnecting nine countries along the eastern seaboard to the rest of the world. Circuits on EASSy can be protected against cable breaks and equipment failures by choosing its ‘in system protection’ option, which reroutes affected traffic onto the EASSy collapsed ring in the event of failure.

The cable landing points are:

- Port Sudan, Sudan
- Djibouti
- Mogadishu, Somalia
- Mombasa, Kenya
- Moroni, Comoros
- Dar es Salaam, Tanzania
- Toliary, Madagascar
- Maputo, Mozambique
- Mtunzini, South Africa

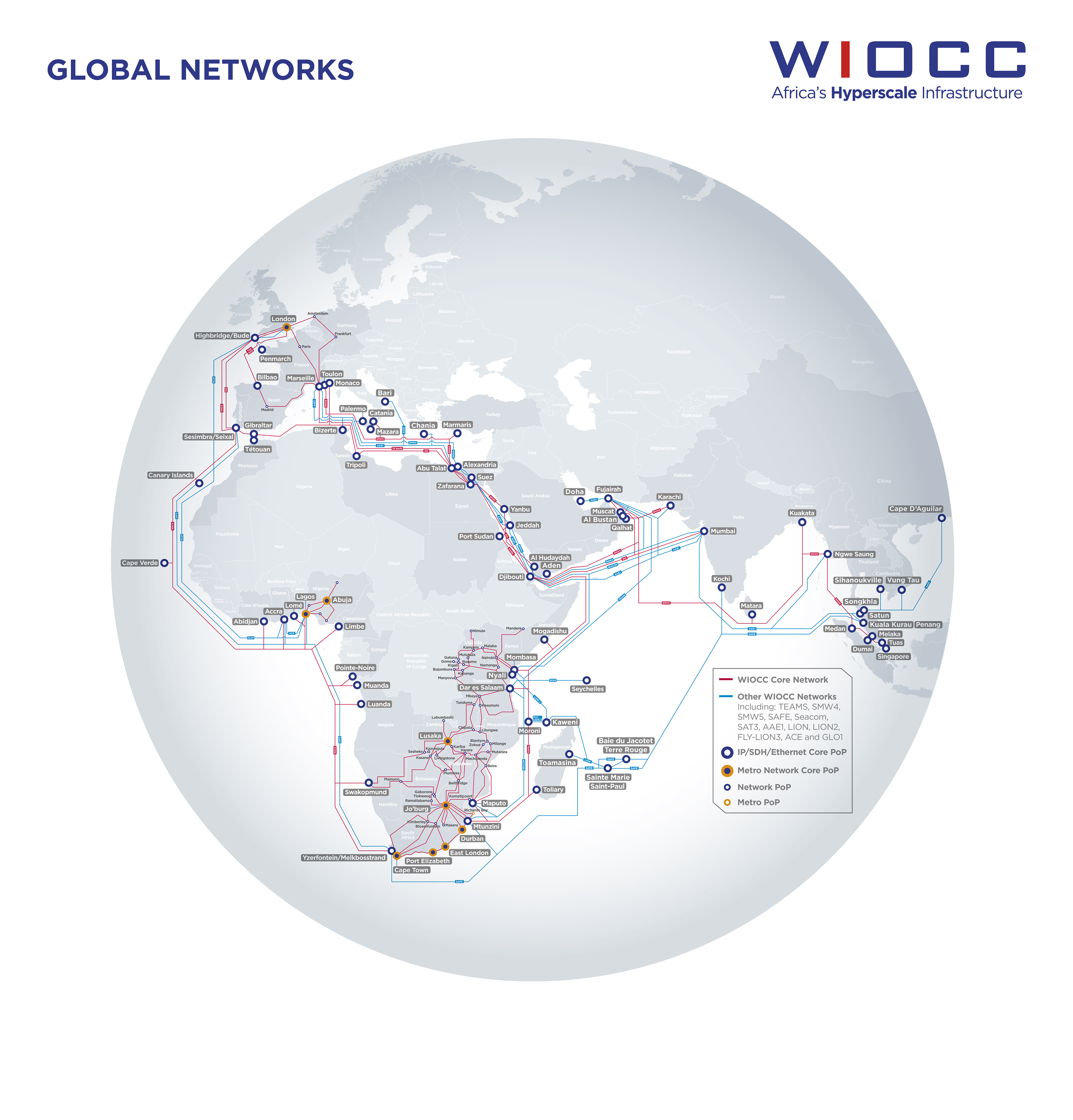
WIOCC Global Network Map

Through strategic investments in several major international submarine cables into Africa, the overall WIOCC network forms a ‘ring’ around Africa. These cables include:

=== Europe India Gateway (EIG) ===
EIG is a 15,000 km with a design capacity of 28 Tbit/s connecting Africa's northern seaboard to Europe, the Middle East and India WIOCC has made a strategic investment in EIG to secure high capacity, high-speed onward connectivity from Djibouti for EASSy.

=== West Africa Cable System (WACS) ===
WACS is the largest submarine cable on Africa's western seaboard, with a design capacity of 14.5 Tbit/s and the largest submarine cable on Africa's western seaboard linking South Africa with the United Kingdom WIOCC has made a strategic investment in WACS. Circuits on WACS can be protected against cable breaks and equipment failures by choosing its ‘in system protection’ option, which reroutes affected traffic onto an alternative fibre pair in the event of a failure.

=== Telecom Egypt North (TE North) ===
TE North is a submarine telecommunications cable linking France and Egypt, a 3,100 km long with a capacity of up to 1.28 Tbit/s over 8 fibre pairs.

=== South East Asia–Middle East–Western Europe 5 (SEA-ME-WE 5) ===
SEA-ME-WE 5 is an optical fibre submarine communications cable system that carries telecommunications approximately 20,000 kilometres long with a design capacity of 24 Terabits per second between Singapore and France.

As well as serving Africa's coastal regions, WIOCC's terrestrial network links to these and other submarine fibre-optic cables and enables businesses and individuals in landlocked countries - such as Lesotho, Zimbabwe, Burundi, Malawi, Rwanda and Uganda to take advantage of cost-effective international connectivity.

=== Equiano ===
Equiano is owned by Google and named after Nigerian-born writer and abolitionist Olaudah Equiano. Running a total of 15,000 km from Portugal along the African west coast, Equiano will be one of the largest cables serving Africa, with 12 fibre pairs delivering a total of 144 Tbit/s of capacity. WIOCC is a key partner in Equiano, landing the cable in Lagos, Nigeria, and owning a full fibre pair on the system.

=== 2Africa ===
2Africa is 180 terabits per second (Tbit/s) 45,000 kilometres, making it the longest subsea cable system ever deployed. The 2Africa consortium comprises China Mobile International, Facebook, MTN GlobalConnect, Orange, stc, Telecom Egypt, Vodafone and WIOCC. WIOCC is a key partner in 2Africa, landing the cable in Amanimtoti, KwaZulu- Natal, and owning a full fibre pair on the system.

== See also ==
- EASSy
- WACS (cable system)
- EIG (cable system)
