= SEACOM =

SEACOM may refer to:

- SEACOM (African cable system), a private venture that owns and operates a submarine cable connecting south and east Africa
- SEACOM (Asian cable system), a telephone cable linking Hong Kong with Malaysia
