= DARE (cable system) =

Djibouti Africa Regional Express (DARE)
- Cable type: Submarine communications cable
- Fate: planned
- Design capacity: 60 Tbit/s
- Built by: TE SubCom
- Area served: East African coast

The DARE (Djibouti Africa Regional Express) submarine communications cable is a planned cable system along the east coast of Africa between Tanzania and Yemen managed by a consortium of 7 operators.

== DARE1 consortium ==
Current members of the consortium are:

- Djibouti Telecom
- Somtel Group

== Topology ==
The ACE system uses wavelength division multiplexing (WDM) technology, which is currently the most advanced for submarine cables. With WDM, cable capacity can be increased without additional submarine work. With an overall potential capacity of 5.12 Tbit/s, the system will support the 40 Gbit/s technology from its launch.

== Landing points ==
The cable landing points are planned to be in the following countries and territories:

- Dar es Salaam, Tanzania
- Mombasa, Kenya
- Mogadishu, Somalia
- Bossaso, Puntland
- Berbera, Somaliland
- Mocha, Yemen
- Socotra, Yemen
- Djibouti

== See also ==
List of international submarine communications cables

Individual cable systems off the east coast of Africa include:

- TEAMS
- Seacom
