= West Africa Cable System =

Submarine communications cable linking Africa with the United Kingdom

West Africa Cable System (WACS)
- Owners: Consortium of 12 carriers: MTN Group, Angola Cables, Broadband Infraco, Cable & Wireless, Congo Telecom, Office Congolais des Postes et Telecommunications (OCPT), PT Comunicações, Togo Telecom, Tata Communications, Telecom Namibia, Telkom SA and Vodacom
- Landing points: 1. Yzerfontein, South Africa; 2. Swakopmund, Namibia; 3. Luanda, Angola; 4. Muanda, Democratic Republic of the Congo; 5. Pointe Noire, Republic of the Congo; 6. Limbe, Cameroon; 7. Lekki, Lagos State, Nigeria; 8. Lomé, Togo; 9. Accra, Ghana; 10. Abidjan, Ivory Coast; 11. Praia, Cape Verde; 12. Las Palmas, Spain; 13. Seixal, Portugal; 14. Highbridge, United Kingdom
- Total length: 14,500 km
- Topology: Trunk and branch
- Design capacity: 14.5 Tbit /s
- Currently lit capacity: 500 Gbit /s
- Technology: Fibre-optic DWDM
- Date of first use: 11 May 2012; 14 years ago
- Website: wacscable.com

WACS logo

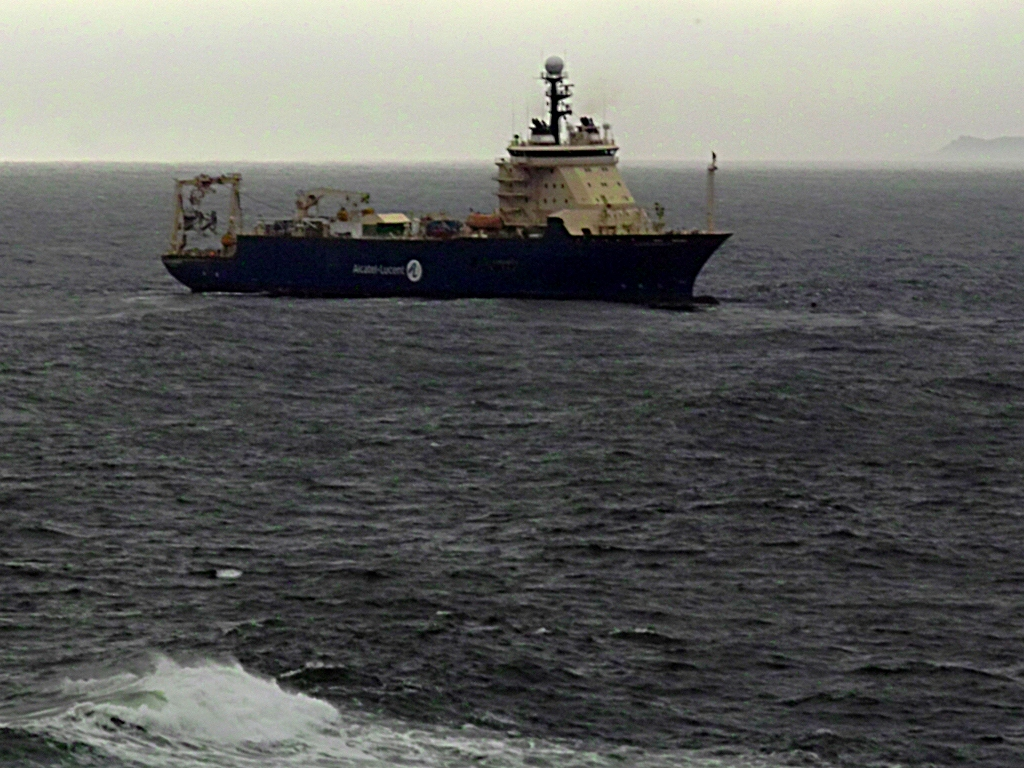
Cable laying ship Île de Bréhat connecting West African Cable System fibre at Yzerfontein in South Africa, 24 April 2011, returning 28 April for inspection

The West Africa Cable System (WACS) is a submarine communications cable linking South Africa with the United Kingdom along the west coast of Africa that was constructed by Alcatel-Lucent. The cable consists of four fibre pairs and is 14,530 km in length, linking from Yzerfontein in the Western Cape of South Africa to London in the United Kingdom.

It has 14 landing points, 12 along the western coast of Africa (including Cape Verde and Canary Islands) and 2 in Europe (Portugal and England) completed on land by a cable termination station in London. The total cost for the cable system is $650 million.

WACS was originally known as the Africa West Coast Cable (AWCC) and was planned to branch to South America but this was dropped and the system eventually became the West African Cable System.

== History ==
On 6 August 2023, the cable system snapped simultaneously with the SAT-3 Cable System after a rock fall in the Congo Canyon. Internet Speeds in Sub-Saharan Africa were impacted, despite new cable systems such as Google Owned Equiano recently landing in the country.

== Landing points ==
The cable has landed in the following countries and locations:

1. South Africa, Western Cape, Yzerfontein
2. Namibia, Swakopmund
3. Angola, Sangano near Luanda
4. Democratic Republic of Congo, Muanda
5. Republic of Congo, Matombi near Pointe Noire
6. Cameroon, Limbe, near Douala
7. Nigeria, Lekki, near Lagos
8. Togo, Afidenyigba near Lomé
9. Ghana, Nungua near Accra
10. Ivory Coast, Abidjan
11. Cape Verde, Palmarejo near Praia
12. Canary Islands, Telde(el Goro) near Las Palmas
13. Portugal, Sesimbra near Seixal
14. United Kingdom, Brean near Highbridge (fiber link is extended by underground cable to London)

The landings in Namibia, the DRC, the Republic of Congo and Togo will provide the first direct connections for these countries to the global submarine cable network. While all earlier submarine cables were terminated at South Africa's international submarine gateways in Melkbosstrand or Mtunzini the WACS cable has been landed at Yzerfontein in order to reduce risk of complete isolation from the rest of the world in the case of damages by earthquakes or a large ship dragging its anchor.

== Design capacity ==
The planned design capacity of WACS was 3.84 Tbit/s when the project agreement was signed in 2008. When delivered in 2012 the initial design capacity was 5.12 Tbit/s. An upgrade delivered by Huawei Marine in December 2015 using WDM Soft Decision FEC and bit interleaved coded modulation advanced decoders permitting the design capacity to be increased to 14.5 Tbit/s.

== Innovations ==
Instead of powering the 236 undersea optical amplifiers and the 12 Submarine branching units along the cable by a single conductor which would require the voltage to be well over 12,000 to 14,000 V in the order of some 24,000 V DC, the system is supplied by two independent rings from Europe to West Africa and West Africa to South Africa, thus reducing the power requirements to around 12,000 V DC.

Branching units are designed to keep the main trunk intact in case of failure. Repairing a branch will not affect the traffic on the main cable. Landing stations support wavelength pass through which means a wavelength coming into a landing station does not just stop there but carries on. This feature allows future upgrade to be carried out without the necessity to have to upgrade each landing point.

== Topology ==
One of the four fibre pairs is a direct route from South Africa to Europe, a so-called express lane. The second and third fibre pairs are designed as a semi-express lane, one with two hops, from South Africa to West Africa and West Africa to Europe and the other with three stops. The fourth fibre pair is an omnibus fibre that stops off at all landing ports en route.

- Fibre Pair one known as the Express lane (South Africa and Portugal)
- Fibre Pair two (South Africa to Nigeria to Portugal)
- Fibre Pair three (South Africa to Angola to DRC to Ivory Coast to Portugal)
- Fibre Pair four (All WACS Landing Stations)

== Construction and ownership ==
The following South African companies were announced as participants in the construction and maintenance of the cable system. MTN Group has invested $90 million in the cable making it the largest investor, and in return will receive 11% of the initial capacity of the cable.

- MTN Group: a South African-based regional mobile operator
- Neotel: South Africa's second fixed line operator - Liquid Telecom bought Neotel in 2018/19
- Telkom South Africa: South Africa's incumbent fixed line operator
- Vodacom: a South African-based regional mobile operator
- Gateway Communications: a pan-African wholesale connectivity and telecommunications provider
- Broadband Infraco: a South African state-owned telecom infrastructure company

On 8 April 2009, the following companies signed the WACS Construction and Maintenance Agreement and formed the final consortium: The WACS consortium includes 12 companies:

1. Vodacom
2. Togo Telecom
3. Telkom (South Africa)
4. Telecom Namibia
5. Tata Communications/Neotel
6. Portugal Telecom/Cabo Verde Telecom
7. Office Congolais des Postes et Telecommunications
8. MTN Group
9. Congo telecom
10. Cable & Wireless Worldwide
11. Broadband Infraco
12. Angola Cables

The supply contract was signed the same day between the consortium members and Alcatel-Lucent Submarine Networks.

Subsea cable laying operations began 15 July 2010 with the departure of Île de Bréhat vessel from Alcatel-Lucent's submarine cable's factory of Calais loaded with almost 6000 km of submarine cables. The cable was simultaneously laid by Alcatel-Lucent's cable ships Île de Bréhat and her sister ship Île de Sein. Subsea cable laying operations were officially finished 19 April 2011 with the landing of the cable on a Yzerfontein's beach in South Africa.

The cable became operational on 11 May 2012 by the launching of the cable in South Africa

The 4-fibre pair submarine cable system was constructed at an approximate total project cost of US$650 million.

== See also ==
List of international submarine communications cables

Individual cable systems off the west coast of Africa include:

- ACE
- ATLANTIS-2
- GLO-1
- Main One
- SAT-2
- SAT-3/WASC

Other African submarine communications cables:

- LION
- SAFE
- SEACOM
- EASSy
- TEAMS

Other African terrestrial communications cables:

- CAB
- BRICS
