= 2024 Internet outage in Africa =

Internet outage in Africa

On March 13, 2024, damage to underwater fibre optic cables caused an internet outage in major parts of Africa especially in West Africa with Ivory Coast, Liberia, Nigeria and Ghana the worst affected countries.

According to data center and connectivity provider MainOne, the internet outage that hit West and Central Africa earlier in that week (from March 12, 2024) was caused by a break in its submarine cable system.

The West Africa Cable System (WACS), the Africa Coast to Europe (ACE), SAT-3 and MainOne were among the system cables affected in Thursday's outage.

In Ghana, the subscribers of MTN Ghana and Telecel Ghana were the most affected.
