= Cacuaco =

- Municipality
- Location in Angola
- Coordinates: 8°40′43″S 13°29′30″E
- Country: Angola
- Admin. division: Luanda Province

Area
  - Total: 33.66 sq mi (87.18 km^{2})

Population (2024)
  - Total: 1,025,859
  - Density: 30,480/sq mi (11,770/km^{2})

Cacuaco is a coastal city and one of the 18 municipalities that make up the province of Luanda. A suburb of the capital, Luanda, it has a population of 1,025,859 (2024 census). The municipality is located in northern Luanda Province and functions as a major industrial and suburban center northeast of Luanda. The city serves as a fast growing and critical infrastructure hub housing Angola’s SAT-3 submarine communications cable landing station and major regional closed access highways.

== Etymology ==
The name of the municipality "Cacuaco" is of Kimbundu origin and comes from a word that meant "hand". In the 16th century, the Angolan Quilombo Quiacasenda of the Kingdom of Ndongo, had to stop to rest after the Fort São Pedro da Barra while retreating from the Portuguese presence in Luanda. Upon rising from his resting place, a mulemba tree grew where his hand rested. It was attributed that the mulemba had healing powers for sick and wounded soldiers. This "mulemba-cacuaco" (African fig tree of the king's hand) which was present in Cacuaco is also said to be an origin to the name of the area.

== History ==
Cacuaco was historically a small fishing village and an important center for the fish trade since at least the 16th century under the Kingdom of Ndongo.

On June 21, 1940, Cacuaco was designated a district by legislative decree. It achieved municipal status on December 13, 1965, via Decree No. 14,061, when the administrative post of Cacuaco was detached from the municipality of Viana to form a new municipality.

Starting in the 1970s, Cacuaco became a site for informal residential expansion driven by the growth of urban Luanda. During the Angolan Civil War, the area accommodated a significant inflow of population driven by rural exodus and refugees fleeing the conflict. In November 1975, the Battle of Quifangondo took place within Quifangondo, an urban district of the municipality.

Following Angolan independence in 1975, an administrative reform reorganized Luanda Province into three municipalities: Ingombota, Viana, Luanda, and Cacuaco, which collectively formed the territory of the capital city. In 1976, following the subdivision of Ingombota to establish Quilamba Quiaxi, Cacuaco was detached from the formal boundaries of the city of Luanda and reverted to being designated as the separate city of Cacuaco.

In February 1996, the municipality signed a town twinning agreement with Alcobaça, Portugal. The protocol was executed by the municipal administrator of Cacuaco, Bonifácio do Espírito Santo, and the president of the Municipal Council of Alcobaça, Miguel Guerra, in the presence of the Provincial Governor of Luanda, Justino Fernandes.

In 2005, Cacuaco was placed under an epidemic alert following the identification of Marburg virus cases by the World Health Organization (WHO). The outbreak was contained through joint efforts by the Angolan Ministry of Health and the WHO.

== Geography ==
The municipality sits on the eastern shore of the Atlantic Ocean along the Bengo Cove. The area historically known for good fishing and calm waters. The Bengo River forms the boundary of the northern extremity of the municipality. The same river is also the city's main source of fresh water. The Mulenvos River also flows through the municipality although it is often a dry bed. In 2026, the municipality opened a bridge over the river.

The municipality hosts several large industrial, housing, and institutional estates built to modern standards. Most of the municipality however remains unplanned and informally built. Most of the urbanized portions of the municipality are made up of informal settlements known as Squatting in Angola. The structures in these settlements are made of plastic, tarp, corrugated metal, wood, and other found scrap. The largest informal settlement is known as Paraíso and is located on the south side of Cacuaco, nearer to Luanda proper. The settlement had a population of 120,000 as of 2018.

== Administrative divisions ==
The Municipality of Cacuaco is made up of three communes:

- Cacuaco
- Kicolo
- Funda

== Economy ==
The economy of Cacuaco is driven primarily by industrial activity, maritime trade, fishing, and regional commerce. Due to its strategic geographical position between the major maritime hubs of the Port of Luanda and the Port of Dande, the municipality maintains a prominent industrial profile. It serves as an important logistics and manufacturing corridor within the broader Luanda Province. Large industrial parks inclusive of industries like concrete production, food processing and distribution are located adjacent to the Fidel Castro Expressway and the EN-100 highway.

The municipality also hosts a small local tourist industry. Due to the city's proximity to Luanda, the beaches of the area are a popular getaway for those who want to swim and fish. A number of small hotels, bars, restaurants and nightclubs line the beach north of the EN-100 highway and west of the Fidel Castro Expressway.

== Infrastructure and Education ==
The municipality is linked to the national territory by the EN-100, EN-110 and EN-225 highways. It is connected to the other cities in the province by the Fidel Castro Expressway which is also known as Via Espresso. Via Espresso acts as a belt road for Luanda, connecting the suburban districts of Cucuaco, Zango, Cabolombo, Kilamba, and Quifica.

The city is served by a station on a branch line of the northern line of the national railway system. The landing station for the Sat3 fibre optic sea cable is located here, operated by Angola Telecom.

Cacuaco has several institutions of higher education including the Institute for Public Finance Training (INFORFIP), the Higher Institute of Angola (ISA), the Higher Intercontinental Polytechnic Institute of Luanda (ISPIL), and a campus of the International Higher Institute of Angola (ISIA).

== See also ==
- Railway stations in Angola
