= BRICS Cable =

Planned optical fibre submarine communications cable system

The BRICS Cable was a planned optical fibre submarine communications cable system that would have carried telecommunications between the BRICS countries, specifically Brazil, Russia, India, China and South Africa. The cable was announced in 2012 but the project was abandoned around 2015. The project aimed to provide bandwidth around the Southern Hemisphere of the globe and to "ensure that developing nations’ communications are not all in the hands of the nations of the North".

The cable was planned to be approximately 34,000 kilometres (21,000 mi) long, and to contain a 2-fibre pair with a 12.8 Tbit/s capacity. It would have interconnected with the WACS cable on the West coast of Africa, and the EASSy and SEACOM cables on the East coast of the continent.

The BRICS cable was intended "to circumvent the U.S. and NSA spying through ports in Russia, China, Singapore, India, Mauritius, South Africa, and Brazil".

The possible landing points were to be: Fortaleza (Brazil), Cape Town (South Africa), Mauritius, Chennai (India), Singapore, Shantou (China), and Vladivostok (Russia).

== See also ==
- WACS
- EASSy
- SEACOM
- List of telecommunications regulatory bodies

For map and logo see: .
