= 2Africa =

International submarine telecommunications cable

- Cable type: Fibre-optic
- Design capacity: 180 Tbit/s (11.25 Tbit/s per fiber pair)
- Built by: Alcatel-Lucent Submarine Networks (ASN)
- Area served: Africa, Asia, and Europe
- Owner(s): Consortium
- Website: www.2africacable.net

2Africa is an international submarine telecommunications cable that interconnects Africa and further connects Asia and Europe. It passes from Europe through the Atlantic Ocean and Indian Ocean, and then back into Europe via the Red Sea and the Mediterranean Sea.

It is one of the first submarine cables to use spatial division multiplexing (SDM1) and has a design capacity of 180 Tbps across 16 fiber pairs. 2Africa is the largest subsea cable in the world, at 45,000 kilometers long, connecting 46 cable landing stations across 33 countries.

The system is to be constructed by Alcatel Submarine Networks and is intended to be operational in Q4 2025. In November 2025, Meta announced that the core 2Africa system was completed.

== Cable ownership ==
2Africa is funded by a consortium consisting of eight members, namely:

- Meta Platforms
- China Mobile
- MTN Group
- Orange S.A.
- Saudi Telecom Company
- Telecom Egypt
- Vodafone Group Plc
- West Indian Ocean Cable Company

=== Open access model ===
The consortium has mandated that every operator of 2Africa must provide effective access to the international capacity at reasonable prices and on non-discriminatory terms. Cable landing station operators can be penalized and even completely disconnected from the 2Africa system if they fail to provide access to capacity at their landing points.

== Landing points and operators ==
2Africa Cable Landing Points
Location	Operator & Technical Partner
Barcelona, Spain	AFR-IX Telecom
Marseille, France	Vodafone Group Plc
Genoa, Italy	Vodafone Group Plc
Tympaki, Greece	Vodafone Group Plc
Port Said, Egypt	Telecom Egypt
Ras Ghareb, Egypt	Telecom Egypt
Duba, Saudi Arabia	Saudi Telecom Company
Yanbu, Saudi Arabia	Saudi Telecom Company
Jeddah, Saudi Arabia	Saudi Telecom Company
Djibouti City, Djibouti	Djibouti Telecom
Berbera, Somaliland	SomCable
Mogadishu, Somalia	Dalkom Somalia
Victoria, Seychelles	Intelvision
Mtwapa, Kenya	Airtel Kenya
Mombasa, Kenya	Airtel Kenya
Dar Es Salaam, Tanzania	Airtel Tanzania
Nacala, Mozambique	Vodacom Mozambique
Mahajanga, Madagascar	Telma Madagascar
Maputo, Mozambique	Vodacom Mozambique
Amanzimtoti, South Africa	West Indian Ocean Cable Company
Gqeberha, South Africa	Vodacom
Yzerfontein, South Africa	MTN Group
Duynefontein, South Africa	MTN Group
Luanda, Angola	Unitel Angola
Moanda, DR Congo	Orange RDC, Airtel DRC
Pointe-Noire, DR Congo	Orange RDC, Airtel DRC
Libreville, Gabon	Airtel Gabon
Akwa Ibom State, Nigeria	MainOne (Equinix)
Lagos, Nigeria	Bayobab (MTN Group)
Accra, Ghana	Bayobab (MTN Group)
Abidjan, Ivory Coast	MTN Group
Dakar, Senegal	Sonatel
Telde, Canary Islands	Vodafone Group Plc
Carcavelos, Portugal	Vodafone Group Plc
Bude, United Kingdom	Vodafone Group Plc

=== 2Africa PEARLS ===
In September 2021, 2Africa announced a new segment of the cable called '2Africa PEARLS', which extends to the Persian Gulf, India and Pakistan.

2Africa PEARLS has been delayed indefinitely due to geopolitical instability in the region. Alcatel Submarine Networks (ASN), the company responsible for laying the undersea cable has declared force majeure and suspended operations in the Persian Gulf due to the 2026 Iran war.

2Africa PEARLS Branch
Location	Operator & Technical Partner
Kalba, UAE	Etisalat by e&
Barka, Oman	Ooredoo Oman
Salalah, Oman	Ooredoo Oman
Doha, Qatar	Vodafone Qatar
Manama, Bahrain	Saudi Telecom Company
Al Khobar, Saudi Arabia	Saudi Telecom Company
Kuwait City, Kuwait	KEMS Zajil Telecom
Al-Faw, Iraq	ITPC
Karachi, Pakistan	Transworld Associates
Mumbai, India	Bharti Airtel

== See also ==
- List of international submarine communications cables
