= HEPN domain =

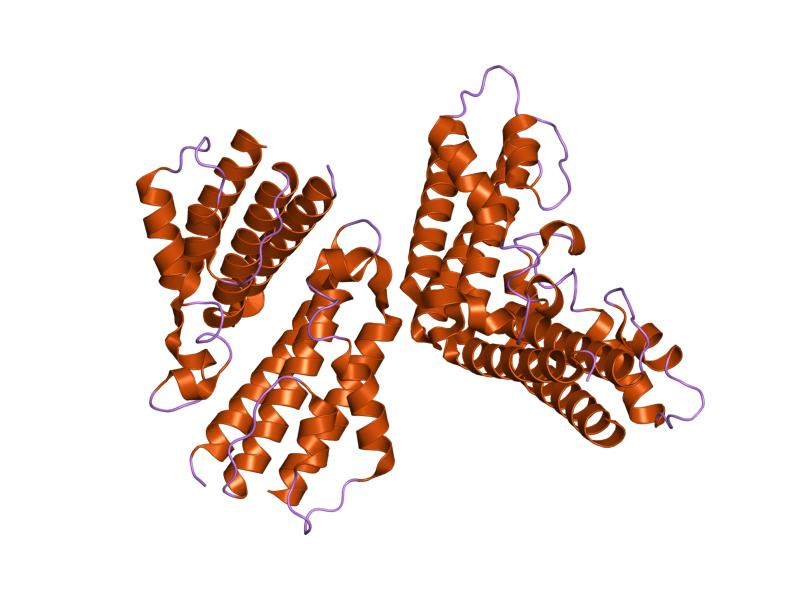
- crystal structure of tt1696 from thermus thermophilus hb8

Identifiers
- Symbol: HEPN
- Pfam: PF05168
- Pfam clan: CL0291
- InterPro: IPR007842
- SCOP2: 1o3u / SCOPe / SUPFAM
Available protein structures:
- PDB: IPR007842 PF05168 (ECOD; PDBsum)
- AlphaFold: IPR007842; PF05168

In molecular biology, the HEPN domain (higher eukaryotes and prokaryotes nucleotide-binding domain) is a region of approximately 110 amino acids found in the C terminus of sacsin, a chaperonin implicated in an early-onset neurodegenerative disease in human, and in many bacterial and archaea proteins. There are three classes of proteins with HEPN domains:

- Single-domain HEPN proteins found in many bacteria.
- Two-domain proteins with N-terminal nucleotidyltransferase (NT) and C- terminal HEPN domains. This N-terminal NT domain belongs to a large family of NTs, which includes several classes of enzymes that are responsible for some types of bacterial resistance to aminoglycosides. These enzymes deactivate various antibiotics by transferring a nucleotidyl group to the drug.
- A multidomain sacsin protein in genomes of fish and mammals. The HEPN domain is located at the C terminus of the protein, directly after the DnaJ domain. The crystal structure of the HEPN domain from the TM0613 protein of Thermotoga maritima indicates that it is structurally similar to the C-terminal all-alpha-helical domain of kanamycin nucleotidyltransferases (KNTases). It is composed of five alpha helices, three of which form an up- and-down helical bundle, with a pair of short helices on the side. The distant structural similarity suggests that the HEPN domain might be involved in nucleotide binding.
