= SACS (cable system) =

Submarine communications cable in the South Atlantic Ocean

SACS (South Atlantic Cable System)
- Cable type: Fibre-optic
- Fate: Completed
- Construction beginning: 2016; 9 years ago
- Construction finished: 2018; 7 years ago
- First traffic: Mid-2018 (ready for service)
- Design capacity: 40 Tb/s
- Landing points: Sangano, Angola; Fernando de Noronha, Brazil; Fortaleza, Brazil
- Area served: South Atlantic
- Owner(s): Angola Cables

The South Atlantic Cable System or SACS (Portuguese: Sistema de Cabo do Atlântico Sul), is a submarine communications cable in the South Atlantic Ocean linking Luanda, Angola with Fortaleza, Brazil with a leg connecting the Brazilian archipelago of Fernando de Noronha as well. It is the first low latency routing between Africa and South America.

The undersea cable measures 6,165 km in length and has been designed with 100 Gbps coherent WDM technology - with 4 fiber pairs and offers a total capacity of 40 Tbit/s between Brazil and Angola.

In September 2018 Angola Cables announced that the SACS cable was on-line and ready to begin commercial operation. It was also reported at this point that it was NEC who was supplying the technology for the cable.

With SACS cable now in operation, data traffic between Angola and Brazil will no longer have to pass through Europe and the US, as was the case previously. The South Atlantic Cable System is owned and operated by Angola Cables.

It is expected that the SACS will cut data traffic costs between South America, Africa and onwards to Asia by 80%.

In Fortaleza the SACS is interconnected to Seabras-1 while the Angolan end provides onward connectivity by the SAT-3/WASC cable. According to its initiators it will have a lot of demand, mainly because it will be the first undersea cable in the South Atlantic linking the African continent to Latin America. The only other planned cable to potentially compete with SACS is the South Atlantic Express cable planned to enter service in 2020.

Construction costs are expected to amount to $278 million, funded by Angola Cables, a consortium of major Angolan telecoms companies (Angola Telecom with 51% of the capital, Unitel with 31%, MSTelcom with 9%, Movicel with 6%, and Startel with 3%).

== Maps ==
Route of the South Atlantic Cable System

== See also ==
- WACS
