= Botswana Fibre Networks =

- Headquarters: Plot 54352 West Avenue, Zambezi Towers, Central Business District, Gaborone, Botswana
- Area served: Botswana
- Products: Wholesale Internet; National Leased Lines; Internet Protocol Transit; WiFi Products
- Owner: Government of Botswana
- Website: www.bofinet.co.bw

Botswana Fibre Networks (BOFINET) is the wholesale provider of national and international telecommunication infrastructure in Botswana formed in 2012 to focus on and improve the backbone network and internet infrastructure of Botswana.

== History ==
Botswana Fibre Networks was formed in 2012 when the Government of Botswana repealed the Botswana Telecommunications Corporation Act to open the market to competition and as they were preparing BTC for initial public offering and to break its monopoly. As a result, the government established Botswana Fibre Networks (BoFiNet) to manage and operate long-distance transmission networks and become a provider to BTC, Mascom, Verbosec, Orange Botswana and other internet service providers. Some of BTC assets were transferred to BoFiNet to enable it to deliver on its mandate. BTC investment in EASSy and West Africa Cable System was transferred to Botswana Fibre Networks as part of the transition.

== See also ==
- Botswana Telecommunications Corporation
- Mascom
- Botswana Communications Regulatory Authority
