= EASSy =

Submarine fibre optic cable system

EASSy (Eastern Africa Submarine Cable System)
- Landing points: Port Sudan, Sudan; Massawa, Eritrea; Djibouti City, Djibouti; Mogadishu, Somalia; Mombasa, Kenya; Moroni, Comoros; Dar es Salaam, Tanzania; Toliary, Madagascar; Maputo, Mozambique; Mtunzini, South Africa
- Total length: 10,000 km
- Design capacity: more than 10 Tbit/s
- Technology: Fiber optics
- Date of first use: July 16, 2010; 16 years ago

The Eastern Africa Submarine Cable System (EASSy) is an undersea fibre optic cable system connecting countries in Eastern Africa to the rest of the world.

EASSy runs from Mtunzini in South Africa to Port Sudan in Sudan, with landing points in nine countries and is connected to at least ten landlocked countries — which will no longer have to rely on satellite Internet access to carry voice and data services.

EASSy was the highest capacity system serving sub-Saharan Africa until the commissioning of WACS. It has a 2 fibre-pair configuration with a design capacity of more than 10 terabit per second (Tbit/s). It is the first to deliver direct connectivity between east Africa and Europe / North America. It is the only system with built-in resilience end-to-end. EASSy interconnects with multiple international submarine cable networks for onward connectivity to Europe, the Americas, and Asia.

The project, partially funded by the World Bank, was initiated in January 2003, when a handful of companies investigated its feasibility. The cable entered service on 16 July 2010, with commercial service starting on 30 July 2010.

== Project milestones ==
- MoU signature – December 2003
- Detailed feasibility study – March 2004
- Data gathering meeting – June 2005
- C&MA drafting finalization – March 2006
- Supply contract award – September 2006
- Registration/incorporation of SPV – January 2007
- Construction and maintenance agreement (Shareholders' Agreement) Signature (C&MA) – 12 October 2006 to 12 February 2007
- Financial closure – March 2007
- Supply contract signature – March 2007
- Construction Started – March 2008
- Cable manufacture complete – November 2009
- Marine laying commencing – December 2009
- Construction complete – April 2010
- Live – July 2010

== Telecommunications companies of participating nations ==
- West Indian Ocean Cable Company WIOCC comprising:
  - Botswana Fibre Networks (BOFINET)
  - DALKOM Somalia
  - Djibouti Telecom
  - Gilat Satcom Nigeria
  - Seychelles Cable System
  - Lesotho Communications Authority
  - Onatel Burundi
  - TMCEL Mozambique
  - Telkom Kenya
  - Libyan Post Telecommunications & Information Technology Company (LPTIC)
  - Liquid Telecom
  - Uganda Telecom Limited
  - Zantel Tanzania
  - TelOne Zimbabwe
- MTN Group
- Sudatel Sudan
- Vodacom
- Telkom South Africa
- Botswana Telecommunications Corporation
- BT Group
- Global Marine Systems
- Comores Cables
- Telma Madagascar
- Etisalat
- FT
- Mauritius Telecom
- STC Saudi Arabia
- Bharti Airtel
- Liquid Telecom
- Tanzania Telecommunications Company Limited

== Cable landing points ==
The cable landing points are:

- Port Sudan, Sudan
- Djibouti
- Mogadishu, Somalia
- Mombasa, Kenya
- Moroni, Comoros
- Dar es Salaam, Tanzania
- Toliary, Madagascar
- Maputo, Mozambique
- Mtunzini, South Africa

== See also ==
- ACE
- LION
- Main One
- SAT-2
- SAT-3/WASC
- SAFE
- SEACOM
- TEAMS
- WACS
- BRICS
- Australia West Express (AWE)
