= TIISCS =

Tata Indicom India-Singapore Cable System (TIISCS)
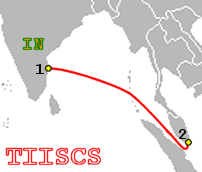
- Owners: Tata Communications Limited (TCL)
- Landing points: Chennai, India; Changi, Singapore
- Total length: 3,175 km (1,973 mi)
- Design capacity: 5.12 Tbit/s
- Date of first use: September 2004

TIISCS (Tata Indicom India-Singapore Cable System), also known as TIC (Tata Indicom Cable), is a submarine telecommunications cable linking India and Singapore. It has landing points in Chennai, India and Changi, Singapore.

Tata Communications Limited (TCL) owned by Tata Indicom Cable (TIC) is Singapore's first fully Indian-owned, undersea fibre-optic cable. The TIC cable is 100 per cent owned, operated, and maintained by TCL.

The 3,175-kilometre (1,973 mi) cable lands in Chennai in India and in Changi in Singapore. Construction of the cable began in November 2003 and went live on 15 September 2004, making it one of the fastest cable build-outs in history. The new 5.12-terabit-per-second TIC cable system will significantly increase the existing bandwidth capacity into India, which is the second fastest growing communications route in the world.
