= PEC (cable system) =

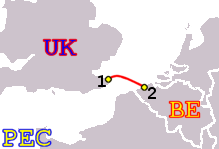

PEC or Pan European Crossing is a fibre optic cable network that links the European Union and the United Kingdom. It has a submarine telecommunications cable system segment crossing the English Channel linking the United Kingdom, Belgium, and France.

One cable has landing points in:

1. Dumpton Gap, Broadstairs, Kent, United Kingdom
2. Bredene near Ostend, West Flanders, Belgium

The other cable has landing points in:

1. Seaford, East Sussex, United Kingdom
2. Veules-les-Roses, France
