= TEAMS (cable system) =

TEAMS (The East African Marine System)
- Owners: Government of Kenya; Etisalat; private investors
- Landing points: 1. Mombasa, Kenya; 2. (United Arab Emirates) Fujairah, UAE
- Total length: 4,500 km
- Topology: unknown
- Design capacity: 40 Gb/s (upgradeable to 640 Gb/s)
- Currently lit capacity: n/a
- Technology: Fiber optics
- Date of first use: April 2009; 17 years ago

TEAMS (The East African Marine System) is an initiative spearheaded by the government of Kenya to link the country to the rest of the world through a submarine fibre optic cable. It was first proposed as an alternative to EASSy, the East African Submarine Cable System. The Kenyan government had grown frustrated with the ownership model favoured by South Africa, the time it was taking and what it perceived as an attempt by South Africa to control the cable. As a result, in November 2006, the Kenyan government decided to partner with the Emirates Telecommunication Establishment (Etisalat) to build its own fibre optic cable.

Although the Kenyan government has decided to pursue their own fibre optic cable, they are still committed to EASSy.

== History ==
Five companies — Alcatel-Lucent, Tyco Telecommunication, Fujitsu Corporation, NEC Corporation and Huawei Technologies — had placed their bids for the building of the TEAMs undersea cable.

On October 11, 2007, Alcatel-Lucent were awarded the $79 million contract to lay the cable. Construction began in January 2008 on the Emirates' side.

On 12 June 2009 the cable arrived in the Kenyan port city of Mombasa and was launched by the President of Kenya Mwai Kibaki, the Prime Minister of Kenya Raila Odinga and other dignitaries.

On 25 February 2012 the TEAMS cable was accidentally cut by a dredging ship carrying some works for the Kenya Ports Authority at Mombasa Offshore. The repairs took about 4 weeks, because of multiple cable cuts between North Sudan and Egypt about the same time. More than half of the networks in Kenya and Uganda were affected. The impact of the break was made worse because TEAMS was itself carrying re-routed EASSy traffic after three cables experienced breaks in the Red Sea on February 17 - Europe India Gateway, SEA-ME-WE 3, and the EASSy.

On 27 April 2012 the TEAMS cable suffered another blow, attributed to the same dredging activities at Mombasa.

== Path ==
The 5,000 km fibre optic cable links the city of Mombasa on the coast of Kenya to Fujairah in the United Arab Emirates.

== Capacity ==
The TEAMS cable was originally designed to have an initial capacity of 80 Gb/s upgradable to 640 Gbit/s should the initial capacity be insufficient. During the implementation of the project, the designed capacity of the system was increased to 1.2 Tb/s and the initial capacity to 120 Gbit/s. Unexpected sharp rise in the demand for international bandwidth is expected to push the parties to the drawing board to consider upgrading the cable system earlier than originally planned. Kenya and the East African countries are increasingly pushing more traffic via the TEAMS cable, because of the perceived better transmission quality (very low latency) and reliability of the system.

== Ownership ==
Ownership of the cable is as follows:

- 15% - Etisalat (UAE)
- 85% - TEAMs (Kenya) Ltd

TEAMS (Kenya) Ltd consists of:

- 20% - Government of Kenya
- 32% - Safaricom Ltd
- 23% - Telkom Kenya
- 10% - Liquid telecom
- 6% - Wananchi Group
- 5% - Jamii Telecom Ltd
- 1.8% - Access Kenya Group
- 1.2% - BCS Group

== See also ==
- SAT-2
- SAT-3/WASC
- SAFE
- Main One
- List of international submarine communications cables

== Sources ==
- http://www.bdafrica.com/index.php?option=com_content&task=view&id=4868&Itemid=5847
- bbc.co.uk
- https://web.archive.org/web/20120218234326/http://www.itu.int/ITU-D/afr/events/arusha-ITU-NEPAD/Documents/doc11(zantel).pdf
- http://www.engineeringnews.co.za/article.php?a_id=120703
- reuters.com
- https://web.archive.org/web/20120301154611/http://www.cio.co.ke/view-all-main-stories/4948-cable-cuts-whos-up-whos-down-.html
