= AFR-IX Telecom =

African internet exchange point company

AFR-IX Telecom is an African internet exchange point company specialized in submarine telecommunications.

== History ==
In January 2022, AFR-IX announced its Medusa Subsea Cable System, an 8700 km submarine cable system consisting of 24 fiber pairs. The €326 million cost is partially financed by the European Investment Bank. Medusa Subsea Cable System connects Lisbon and Sines, Portugal to Port Said, in Egypt; Barcelona, Torreguadiaro, Zahara, and Alacant in Spain; Tétouan and Nador in Morocco; Bizerte in Tunisia; Algiers and Collo in Algeria; Marseille in France; Mazara del Vallo in Italy; Yeroskipou in Cyprus; and Tympaki in Greece.

In March 2022, Telecom Egypt reached an agreement with AFR-IX at the 2022 Mobile World Congress to provide infrastructure for Medusa Subsea Cable System across Egypt. AFR-IX telecom established a point of presence (PoP) in Lagos in 2021 and Accra in December 2022.

In 2023, AFR-IX partnered with Libyan United International for Telecommunication and Technology (LUIC) to land the cable in Tripoli and Benghazi. Colt Technology Services became the first terrestrial client of AFR-IX's Barcelona cable landing station (CLS) in January 2023.

In February 2025, Tunisie Telecom signed a partnership agreement with Medusa Subsea Cable System for its 5G services. AFR-IX Telecom secured a €14.3 million grant from the European Commission to extend the Medusa Subsea Cable System into West Africa in March 2025. The service will also extend to Democratic Republic of Congo.
