= ODIN (cable system) =

Submarine telecommunications cable system

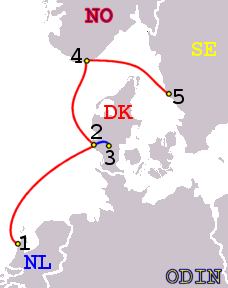

ODIN was a submarine telecommunications cable system linking the Netherlands, Denmark, Norway, and Sweden.

It was 1040 km in length and used Synchronous Digital Hierarchy technology and had two 2.5Gbit/s lines (One active and one redundant) and can simultaneously carry 30,000 telephone calls. It was built in 3 segments (Segment 1: Netherlands - Denmark, segment 2: Denmark - Norway, Segment 3: Norway - Sweden) and the project cost DKK 480m (Approx. €64.5m).

It had landing points in:

1. Alkmaar, Netherlands
2. Måde, Denmark
3. Blåbjerg, Denmark
4. Kristiansand, Norway
5. Lysekil, Sweden

The segment between Måde and Blåbjerg was overland (shown in blue).

ODIN Seg1 is out of service since 1 January 2007.

Segment 3 is out of service since approximately 22 April 2008.

The last segment was taken out of service before January 2009.
