= Autosomal recessive spastic ataxia of Charlevoix-Saguenay =

- Other names: Autosomal recessive spastic ataxia type 6
- This condition is inherited in an autosomal recessive manner
- Specialty: Neurology

Autosomal recessive spastic ataxia of Charlevoix-Saguenay (ARSACS) is a very rare neurodegenerative genetic disorder that primarily affects people from the Charlevoix and Saguenay–Lac-Saint-Jean regions of Quebec or descendants of native settlers in this region. This disorder has also been demonstrated in people from various other countries including India, Turkey, Japan, the Netherlands, Italy, Belgium, Finland, France, and Spain. The prevalence has been estimated at 1 in 1,900 in Quebec, but it is very rare elsewhere.

== Symptoms and signs ==
ARSACS is usually diagnosed in early childhood, approximately 12–24 months of age when a child begins to take their first steps. At this time, it manifests as a lack of coordination and balance resulting in frequent falls. Some of the signs and symptoms include:

- stiffness of the legs
- appendicular and trunk ataxia
- hollow foot and hand deformities
- ataxic dysarthria
- distal muscle wasting
- horizontal gaze nystagmus
- spasticity

== Genetics ==
The inheritance pattern is autosomal recessive. The disorder is caused by mutations in the SACS gene on Chromosome 13. It is unclear as to how these mutations affect the central nervous system (CNS) and skeletal muscles presenting in the signs and symptoms of ARSACS.

== Prognosis ==
Most patients begin to use a wheelchair for movement around age 30–40. Death usually occurs in their 60s, but some have been reported to live longer.
