= TIS (cable system) =

Telecommunication cable

TIS (Thailand-Indonesia-Singapore) is a submarine telecommunications cable system in the South China Sea linking Thailand, Singapore, and Indonesia

It has landing points in:

1. Songkhla, Songkhla Province, Thailand
2. Changi, Singapore
3. Batam, Riau Islands, Indonesia

It has an initial transmission capacity of 30 Gbit/s, upgradeable to 320 Gbit/s, and a total cable length of approximately 1,100 km. It started operation in December 2003.
