= ASEAN (cable system) =

Decommissioned submarine telecommunications cable system

The ASEAN cable system was a submarine telecommunications cable system linking Indonesia, Malaysia, Singapore, Thailand and the Philippines. It was completed in September 1983, but has since been decommissioned.

== Construction ==
Construction was split into four sections. The first section, a 1,534 nmi (2,841 km) cable, was laid in 1978 with landing points at Currimao, Ilocos Norte in the Philippines and Katong, Singapore. The second section, laid in 1980, was a 572 nmi cable from Ancol, Indonesia (near Jakarta) to Changi, Singapore. The third section, laid in 1983, was a 920 nmi cable between Singapore, Malaysia and Thailand. The final section laid, was from Thailand to the Philippines.

== Capacity ==
The cable carried 1380 circuits, which were allocated on the basis of ownership shares in the whole project.
