= Umlalazi Nature Reserve =

Coastal nature reserve in north Kwa-Zulu-Natal, South Africa

- Location within KwaZulu-Natal
- Location: KwaZulu-Natal, South Africa
- Nearest city: Mtunzini
- Coordinates: 29.002°S 31.722°E
- Area: 10.28 km^{2} (3.97 sq mi)
- Established: 1948

The Umlalazi Nature Reserve is a coastal reserve situated 1 km (0.62 mi) from Mtunzini on the KwaZulu-Natal North Coast. Umlalazi was established as a protected area in 1948 and is 10.28 km^{2} (3.97 mi^{2}) in extent. Home to the palm-nut vulture, which is one of the rarest birds of prey in South Africa.

Lagoons can have crocodiles. There are three trails in the reserve. One of which passes examples of mangrove swamps in South Africa, where several species of mangrove can be found. Another walk leads through the dune forest where bushpig, bushbuck and red, grey and blue duiker may occasionally be seen.

The third trail leads through dune forest and mangrove swamp along the edge of the river. Wildflowers and a variety of bird life can be seen. There are also colonies of fiddler crabs and mud-skippers.
