= LION (cable system) =

Submarine cable which connects Madagascar, Réunion and Mauritius

Lower Indian Ocean Network (LION)
- Landing points: Toamasina, Madagascar; Sainte-Marie, Réunion; Terre Rouge, Mauritius
- Total length: 1000 km
- Design capacity: 1.28 terabits per second
- Date of first use: 2009

Lower Indian Ocean Network (LION) is a submarine communications cable network that connects Madagascar, Réunion, and Mauritius.

== History ==
The construction of a new submarine cable to connect the Southeast African islands was announced in March 2008. The project was financed by a consortium made up of Orange Madagascar, Mauritius Telecom and France Telecom S.A. Overall, the LION project cost an estimated 37 million dollars. The Mauritius Telecom group has reportedly invested 10.8 million in the project. The LION I network was inaugurated in March 2010. This cable digitized the region, and paved the way for the development of an outsourcing economy (call centers).

LION II, linking Madagascar, Mayotte and Kenya, was launched in April 2012. In July 2017, Orange announced the construction of FLY-LION III, a 400 km extension of LION I and II. The capacity of this new cable should be 4 terabits/s.

In July 2018, the website Cable.com ranked Madagascar 22nd in the list of countries with the fastest connections.

On 5–6 October 2018, the LION II cable broke, leading to a severe decrease of digital access in Mayotte the following days. While Emtel had to play the diplomacy with its users, Mauritius Telecom, thanks to its global participation in the LION consortium, was able to re-route on other LION cables for balance-loading.

== Description ==
The LION is 1,000 kilometres long and delivers up to 1.28 terabits per second. To reach Europe and other destinations, the LION cable is linked to the SAFE cable and will be connected to the EASSy and the East African Marine System (TEAMs) cable when they are operational.

It has cable landing points at:

- Toamasina, Toamasina Province, Atsinanana Region, Madagascar
- Sainte Marie, Saint-Denis Arrondissement, Réunion
- Terre Rouge, Pamplemousses District, Mauritius

The LION II submarine cable network (2700 km), which required a 57 million euro investment, connects the LION I network to Mayotte and Mombasa, Kenya. The LION II network enables a shorter cable distance to the Middle East and Europe, thus lowering latency between servers.
