= Hellkom =

- Website type: Informational
- Owner: Gregg Stirton
- Creator: Gregg Stirton
- Website: hellkom.co.za
- Commercial: No

Hellkom is an Internet parody site about Telkom, South Africa's telecommunications monopoly. It was started by Gregg Stirton in June 2004 as a protest to the parastatal's excessive pricing for its services. In April 2009, Stirton started a discussion forum named BBLounge (short for broadband lounge) to complement the site. Hellkom and BBLounge communities represent South African telecommunication consumers who want to see South Africa benefit from full liberalisation of the telecommunications sector in South Africa by educating the public and the media.

Statistical, financial and factual information is provided in an effort to educate the South African and international public of the current telecommunication situation in South Africa.

Currently, 1.7 million South Africans have Internet access, from a population of 44 million people. 0.2% of the population have ADSL broadband access. (Source: INTUG)

South African ADSL broadband usage is currently being hampered by the 3 GB monthly traffic limit (equivalent to less than a day of moderately sustained usage, after which access is cut off for the rest of the month), by the cost of the service, and by the heavy port prioritization and bandwidth throttling/traffic shaping of international traffic at exchanges. The reason, speculates the Communications Users Association of South Africa (CUASA), is that incumbent Telkom makes more from leased line solutions than it ever will from providing ADSL. Technical professionals seeking acceptable telecommunications infrastructure to support their work often find emigration an attractive option; in this way Telkom is at least partly responsible for the continuing exodus of much-needed skilled workers.

"The whole country is being hamstrung by Telkom and restrictive legislation. One colonial-style monopoly is manufacturing all the salt and reselling it in limited quantities at restrictive prices." (Source: INTUG)

== Related Organizations ==
- BBLounge
- Antitrust
