= Structural Analysis of Cultural Systems =

NGO, indigenous peoples

Structural Analysis of Cultural Systems (S.A.C.S.) is a non-governmental organization in Special Consultative Status with the Economic and Social Council of the United Nations. Its main activities are conducting culture-related research with a focus on indigenous cultures, empowerment of indigenous culture, intervention projects, and knowledge dissemination. Intervention projects of S.A.C.S. are mainly targeted at applying indigenous rights as formulated in the UN Declaration on the Rights of Indigenous Peoples. S.A.C.S. also offers consultancy, and it is engaged in education and training.

== History ==
S.A.C.S. is a follow-up to the EU-project CULTOS (2001–2003). After the recommendation of the European Commission to continue research activities, S.A.C.S. was registered at Technische Universität Berlin in 2004. Founders were Roland Posner, late professor emeritus of linguistics and head of the semiotics research centre at TU Berlin, and Monika Walter, professor of romance literatures at TU Berlin. After its foundation, S.A.C.S. shifted its emphasis towards issues of cultural psychology, cultural semiotics, indigenous peoples and UN related work. Furthermore, it integrated a team of psychologists to provide expert reports for family courts, notably in child custody cases with mixed cultural backgrounds. In 2011, S.A.C.S. was officially registered as a non-governmental organization at the United Nations. It remained at TU Berlin until the end of 2012 and then became independent. From 2013 to 2015, S.A.C.S. had an office at the Humboldt University of Berlin. In 2014, S.A.C.S. was awarded Special Consultative Status by the UN Economic and Social Council. Social research scientist Arnold Groh, who also was in charge of the predecessor project CULTOS at TU Berlin, is president/director of S.A.C.S.

== Affiliations ==
S.A.C.S. is affiliated with the International Academy Berlin for Innovative Pedagogy, Psychology and Economics gGmbH (INA), with the aid agency Nehemiah Gateway, and with two of the SRH University of Applied Sciences’ institutes: The International Institute for Sustainability, Diversity and Knowledge Transfer (ISDK) and the Institute for Culture and Diversity Studies. S.A.C.S. maintains extensive academic cooperations and exchange with universities and other institutions worldwide.
