= Submarine branching unit =

A submarine branching unit is a piece of equipment used inline within submarine telecommunications cable systems to allow the cable to split to serve more than one destination. For example, one branch might head for a cable landing point and others may continue to other destinations.

There are several methods by which the split can be effected, which can also depend on the type of cable system:

- Purely electrical systems (now almost obsolete) can be split by either:
  - Physically separating the signal cables so some go in one direction and some in another, which requires no additional power.
  - Using an add-drop multiplexer to direct the signals down one path or the other. The electrical equipment that acts as the add-drop multiplexer will need powering.
- Optical fiber cable systems can be split by either:
  - Physically separating the signal-carrying fibers so some go in one direction and some in another, which requires no additional power.
  - Converting the optically carried signals to electrical signals, using an add-drop multiplexer to divide and recombine the signals on the desired paths, the reconverting back to optically carried signals. This signal conversion and multiplexing equipment will require power.
  - Using a reconfigurable optical add-drop multiplexer to direct optical carrier frequencies down desired paths. The power requirements of optical multiplexing in this manner will be lower than the previous method.

In both types of cable system, more than one technique can be used simultaneously.

The conventional symbol used for a submarine branching unit in maps of cable routes is a small equilateral triangle with (usually) one vertex pointing towards the top of the map.

== See also ==
- Festoon cable
