= SEACOM (Asian cable system) =

SEACOM is a telephone submarine cable linking Hong Kong with Malaysia.

Its telephone link was opened in 1967.

At one stage it also included the terrestrial radio microwave analogue link along the eastern coast of Australia, operated by the Postmaster-General's Department which was the forerunner of Telstra. This communication link rejoined the undersea cable section at Cairns in north Queensland.

== See also ==
- SEACOM (African cable system)
