= Sacsin =

Protein-coding gene in the species Homo sapiens

SACS
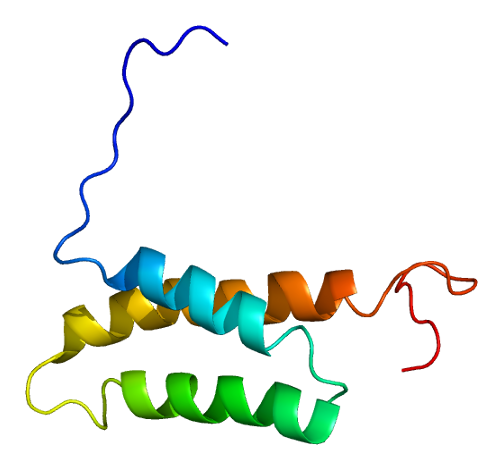

Identifiers
- Aliases: SACS, ARDNAJC29, PPP1R138, SPAX6, sacsin molecular chaperone
- External IDs: OMIM: 604490; MGI: 1354724; GeneCards: SACS
Available structures
PDB	Ortholog search: PDBe RCSB
PDB	List of PDB id codes 1IUR, 3O10

Gene location (Human)
Chr.	Chromosome 13 (human)
Band	13q12.12	Start	23,288,689 bp
Band	13q12.12	End	23,433,763 bp

Gene location (Mouse)
Chr.	Chromosome 14 (mouse)
Band	14 D1|14 32.13 cM	Start	61,375,906 bp
Band	14 D1|14 32.13 cM	End	61,478,144 bp
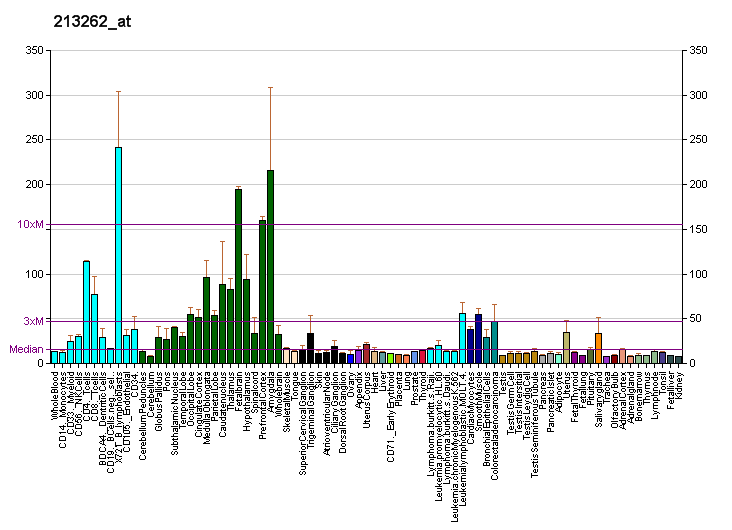
RNA expression pattern
Bgee	Human / Mouse (ortholog); Top expressed in: Brodmann area 23; middle frontal gyrus; frontal pole; Brodmann area 10; thoracic diaphragm; Skeletal muscle tissue of rectus abdominis; lateral nuclear group of thalamus; middle temporal gyrus; biceps brachii; Skeletal muscle tissue of biceps brachii / Top expressed in: pontine nuclei; deep cerebellar nuclei; medial geniculate nucleus; medial dorsal nucleus; medial vestibular nucleus; lateral geniculate nucleus; inferior colliculi; dorsal striatum; substantia nigra; primary motor cortex; More reference expression data
BioGPS	More reference expression data
Gene ontology
Molecular function	Hsp70 protein binding; proteasome binding; chaperone binding
Cellular component	cytoplasm; axon; dendrite; mitochondrion; nucleus; cell body fiber
Biological process	protein folding; negative regulation of inclusion body assembly
Sources:Amigo / QuickGO
Orthologs
Databases	NCBI: entry; OMA: entry
Species	Human	Mouse
Entrez	26278	50720
Ensembl	ENSG00000151835	ENSMUSG00000048279
UniProt	Q9NZJ4	Q9JLC8
RefSeq (mRNA)	NM_001278055; NM_014363; NM_152752	NM_015788; NM_172809
RefSeq (protein)	NP_001264984; NP_055178	NP_766397; NP_056603
Location (UCSC)	Chr 13: 23.29 – 23.43 Mb	Chr 14: 61.38 – 61.48 Mb
PubMed search
- Wikidata
View/Edit Human	View/Edit Mouse

Sacsin also known as DnaJ homolog subfamily C member 29 (DNAJC29) is a protein that in humans is encoded by the SACS gene. Sacsin is a Hsp70 co-chaperone.

== Function ==
This gene consists of nine exons including a gigantic exon spanning more than 12.8k bp. It encodes the sacsin protein, which includes a UBQ region at the N-terminus, a HEPN domain at the C-terminus and a DnaJ region upstream of the HEPN domain. This modular protein is essential for normal mitochondrial network organization. The gene is highly expressed in the central nervous system, also found in skin, skeletal muscles and at low levels in the pancreas. Mutations in this gene result in autosomal recessive spastic ataxia of Charlevoix-Saguenay (ARSACS), a neurodegenerative disorder characterized by early-onset cerebellar ataxia with spasticity and peripheral neuropathy.

== Clinical significance ==
Autosomal recessive spastic ataxia of Charlevoix-Saguenay (ARSACS) is a very rare neurodegenerative genetic disorder that results from mutations in the gene that produces Sacsin. Afflicted persons suffer from loss of balance, loss of muscle control and spasticity.
