= Kikolo =

- commune
- Location in Angola
- Country: Angola
- Province: Luanda

Area
  - Total: 15.2 sq mi (39.4 km^{2})

Population (2014)
  - Total: 601,599
  - Density: 39,500/sq mi (15,300/km^{2})
- Time zone: UTC+1 (WAT)

Kikolo is a town and commune of Angola, located in the province of Luanda.

== See also ==
- Communes of Angola
