= Fort São Pedro da Barra =

Fort São Pedro da Barra de Luanda
- Fortaleza de São Pedro da Barra de Luanda
- Luanda in Angola

Site information
- Controlled by: Dutch West India Company; Portuguese Empire; Angola
- Condition: Ruined

Location
- Coordinates: 8°46′24″S 13°17′10″E

Site history
- Built: 1703-1780

The Fort São Pedro da Barra de Luanda, is located in the former Hill of Cassandama (Morro de Cassandama in Portuguese), now Angola Quiluanje neighborhood, in Luanda, Angola.

It is the only fort in Luanda that was not completely built by the Portuguese, having been started by the Dutch.

== History ==
The earliest fortification of the place of Cassandama dates to an artillery battery cut out on the sea-side rocks by the Dutch West India Company when they briefly took control of Luanda from the Portuguese, between 1641 and 1648.

After the city was retaken by a Portuguese expedition under the command of Salvador Correia de Sá e Benevides, King Afonso VI of Portugal determined in 1663 that the defences of Luanda harbour be strengthened. The city-hall of Luanda selected Cassandama as the place for a new fort, which was started in 1703 and completely paid by the city. It crossed fire with the Fort Nossa Senhora da Flor da Rosa on the Island of Luanda across the Luanda harbour.

The fort was used as a slave entrepot. As the threat of incursions by foreign European powers lessened, the fort fell into disuse and was later used as a prison beginning in the 19th century to the beginning of the 20th. It was restored between 1942 and 1943 by the army captain Durão Paias.

The ruins of the fort were classified as a National Monument by a Provincial Decree nº 1057 of September 9, 1932, as published in the Official Bulletin nº37.

It is state property, under the responsibility of the Ministry of Defence. It is in ruined condition.

== Features ==
It is shaped like an irregular poligon approaching the shape of a square, with half a bastion on each edge, with walls of varying thickness.

== See also ==
- Portuguese Angola
- Dutch Loango-Angola
