= SAT-3/WASC =

Submarine communications cable

South Atlantic 3/West Africa Submarine Cable (SAT-3/WASC)
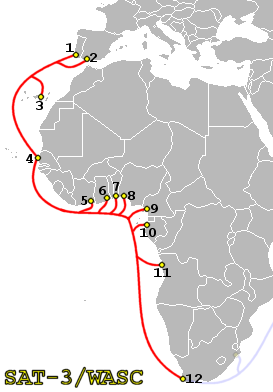
- Owners: Telkom Group (13%), France Telecom (12.08%), Nitel (8.39%), AT&T (12.42%), and VSNL (8.93%).
- Landing points: Chipiona, Spain; Altavista, Gran Canaria, Spain; Sesimbra, Portugal; Dakar, Senegal; Abidjan, Côte d’Ivoire; Accra, Ghana; Cotonou, Benin; Lagos, Nigeria; Douala, Cameroon; Libreville, Gabon; Cacuaco, Angola; Melkbosstrand, South Africa
- Total length: 13000 km
- Topology: trunk and branch
- Design capacity: 340 Gbit /s
- Technology: Fibre-optic
- Date of first use: 2001

SAT-3/WASC or South Atlantic 3/West Africa Submarine Cable is a submarine communications cable linking Portugal and Spain to South Africa, with connections to several West African countries along the route.

It forms part of the SAT-3/WASC/SAFE cable system, where the SAFE cable links South Africa to Asia. The SAT-3/WASC/SAFE system provides a path between Asia and Europe for telecommunications traffic that is an alternative to the cable routes that pass through the Middle East, such as SEA-ME-WE 3 and FLAG. SAT-3 has a capacity of 340 Gbit/s while SAFE has a capacity of 440 Gbit/s. The SAT-3 system together with SAFE was built by a consortium of operators .

== History ==
SAT-3/WASC/SAFE began operations in 2001, providing the first links to Europe for West African internet users and, for South Africans, taking up service from SAT-2 which was reaching maximum capacity. SAT-2 had been brought into service in the early 1990s as a replacement for the original undersea cable SAT-1 which was constructed in the 1960s.

In November 2007, no internet access was available through SAT-3 for about seven days in parts of central Africa. A government official from Cameroon blamed a technical failure at the underwater SAT-3 high sea fibre optic terminal, about forty kilometres from Douala. Many ISPs in Cameroon had transitioned their connections from independent satellite connections to SAT-3 in mid-2007 creating serious communication difficulties during the seven days.

In late July 2009, SAT-3 cable damage caused internet blackouts in multiple west African countries including Benin, Togo, Niger, and Nigeria. Togo and Niger were "completely offline" and Benin was able to "reroute its net traffic through neighboring countries." However, the three nations were able to use alternative satellite links in order to maintain some Internet communication with the rest of the world. Nigeria suffered a 70% loss of bandwidth that caused problems in banking, government and other mobile networks. President of the Nigeria Internet Group, Lanre Ajayi, said, "[the cable is] a critical national resource because of its importance to the economy and to security." Two weeks may pass before the cable is fixed.

Nigeria portion of SAT3 cable was damaged in March 2016. On June 9, 2017, the link between Pointe-Noire in- the Republic of the Congo to the international cable was cut off by a fishing vessel forcing network providers to provide internet using V-SAT. The cable was restored after 15 days.

Gabon, Congo, DRC and Cameroon experienced internet disruption due to the rupture of the cable on 17 January 2020 off the coast of Gabon. It was fixed on January 27.

On 6 August 2023, the cable system snapped simultaneously with the WACS Cable System after a rock fall in the Congo Canyon. Internet Speeds in Sub-Saharan Africa were impacted, despite new cable systems such as Google Owned Equiano recently landing in the country.

== Landing Points ==
1. Sesimbra, Portugal
2. Chipiona, Spain (though this landing is considered to be part of the Telefónica domestic network)
3. Alta Vista in Las Palmas, Canary Islands

and in Africa:

1. Dakar, Senegal
2. Abidjan, Côte d'Ivoire
3. Accra, Ghana
4. Cotonou, Benin
5. Lagos, Lagos, Nigeria
6. Douala, Cameroon
7. Libreville, Gabon
8. Cacuaco, Angola
9. Melkbosstrand, South Africa meeting SAFE

Although Telecom Namibia holds ownership in SAT-3/WASC, Namibia has no landing point. Namibian internet users currently have no access to SAT-3/WASC, because Telecom Namibia would have to purchase capacity from Telkom SA, and due to Telkom SA's high prices has so far refused to do so.

== Bandwidth costs ==
Prices for SAT-3 bandwidth in the African countries it serves are high (US$4,500–12,000 per Mbit/s per month, over 50 times greater than bandwidth prices in the U.S.) in large part because operators have monopoly control of access. The lowest rates occur in Ghana, where the Ghana Internet Service Providers Association (GISPA) organized a two-year negotiation through a court fight against Ghana Telecom. SEACOM president Brian Herlihy states that the owners of the SAT-3 cable have cut prices by 50% since the 2007 announcement of Seacom, in order to compete with the arrival of Seacom in East Africa.

== Technology ==
The cable itself consists of four fibers, using Erbium-doped fiber amplifier repeaters and wavelength division multiplexing.

== See also ==
- List of international submarine communications cables
- Individual cable systems off the coast of Africa include:

- Atlantis-2 Argentina linked to Portugal
- EASSy East Africa Cable linking South Africa and East African nations.
- LION
- Main One Portugal linked to West Africa
- SAT-2 Portugal linked to South Africa
- SEACOM East coast of Africa
- GLO-1 Nigeria to the UK
- ACE South Africa linked to France
- WACS South Africa linked to the United Kingdom
