= Kanamycin nucleotidyltransferase =

KNTase C-terminal domain
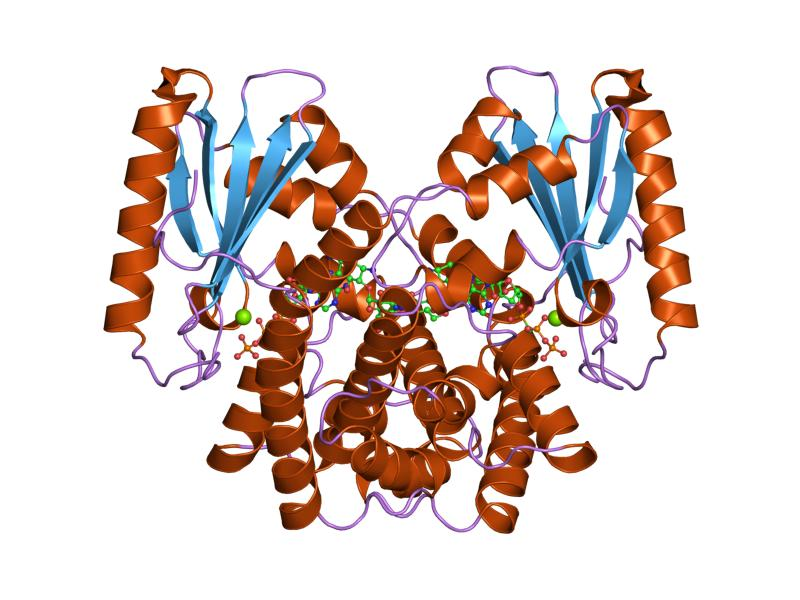
- kanamycin nucleotidyltransferase

Identifiers
- Symbol: KNTase_C
- Pfam: PF07827
- Pfam clan: CL0291
- InterPro: IPR012481
- SCOP2: 1kny / SCOPe / SUPFAM
Available protein structures:
- PDB: IPR012481 PF07827 (ECOD; PDBsum)
- AlphaFold: IPR012481; PF07827

In molecular biology, kanamycin nucleotidyltransferase EC 2.7.7.- (KNTase) is an enzyme which is involved in conferring resistance to aminoglycoside antibiotics. It catalyses the transfer of a nucleoside monophosphate group from a nucleotide to kanamycin. This enzyme is dimeric with each subunit being composed of two domains. The C-terminal domain contains five alpha helices, four of which are organised into an up-and-down alpha helical bundle. Residues found in this domain may contribute to this enzyme's active site.
