= MSTelcom =

Angolan telecommunications company

- Company type: Subsidiary
- Industry: Telecommunications
- Founded: March 21, 1997
- Headquarters: Luanda, Angola
- Key people: Roger Ferreira, President of the Executive Board of Directors; Patrício Gouveia, Executive Board Member; Edivaldo Manuel, Executive Board Member
- Products: Telecommunications services Internet services
- Parent: Sonangol Group
- Website: www.mstelcom.co.ao

MSTelcom is a subsidiary of Sonangol Group, the state petroleum company of Angola. MSTelcom provides a range of telecommunications services for the oil industry as well as for residential and corporate clients. Its name comes from "Mercury Telecommunication Services SARL". Its competitors include Angola Telecom.

== Operations ==
- TCC The company's hub is the TCC, or Telecommunications Center, located in Luanda, the capital of Angola.
- Telephony MSTelcom provides a countrywide landline network with international access, wireless local loop DECT coverage, and VSAT satellite service for corporate clients.
- Data The company provides corporate data transmission services.
- Internet MSTelcom is an end user Internet service provider with corporate and residential customers.
- Microwave Network The company provides medium and high microwave bandwidth corporate networks.
- Radio MSTelcom provides a national and international voice and data radio communications system, a maritime VHF network, an aeronautical VHF network, a community ground UHF radio repeater network, and a radio trunking system.

In 2024, MSTelcom announced a collaboration with Emerson to enhance industrial automation services in Angola, focusing on improving efficiency and digitalization in the energy and industrial sectors.
