= Movicel =

- Type: Private company
- Industry: Mobile telephony Fixed telephony Mobile Internet
- Genre: Telecommunications
- Founded: 12 September 2002; 24 years ago
- Headquarters: Luanda
- Area served: Angola
- Products: 2G; 3G; 4G; GSM; GPRS; LTE; EDGE; UMTS
- Revenue: $12.8 Million USD (2019)[1]
- Number of employees: ~1,500 (2019)
- Website: http://www.movicel.com/

Movicel is the smaller of the two Angolan mobile phone companies. Its official name is Movicel Telecomunicações S.A.. Movicel was originally created on July 1, 2003, as a subsidiary of the state-owned Angola Telecom. In 2010, 80% of the company's capital was sold to various private companies: Portmil - Investimentos e Telecomunicações, S.A., Modus Comunicar, S.A., Ipangue, S.A., Lambda Investment and Novatel Wireless. The remaining 20% remain in the hands of the state-owned (empresa pública) companies Angola Telecom and ENCTA. The seat of the company is the capital city Luanda. Movicel sells its services via a network of shops; recharging cards for pre-paid contracts are also sold by individual street sellers.

Movicel claims to have more than 3 million customers out of a population of estimated 18 to 20 million people in Angola.

Movicel offers GSM-based mobile communication for voice communications, text and multimedia messages, and mobile internet access. Movicel has coverage in all 18 Angolan provinces. Movicel sets forth its roaming agreements with 500 mobile phone provides in 213 countries and territories on all continents. As of 2013, this roaming coverage is available only for post-paid contracts. Pre-paid contracts may use roaming only in selected countries.

The tariff is calculated in UTT (Unidade Tarifária de Telecomunicações - Telecommunication Tariff Units), a common tariff unit used by all telecommunication companies in Angola. The price of one UTT is 10 kwanzas. Recharging cards are available with 400 Kz, 900 Kz, 2.500 Kz, 4.500 Kz and 8.800 Kz.

The prefixes for Movicel phone numbers are 91 and 99.

== See also ==
- Unitel (Angola)
- Angola Telecom
