= Angola Telecom =

Angolan telecommunication company

- Type: E.P. (Empresa Publica) State owned
- Industry: Telecommunications
- Founded: 1992
- Headquarters: Luanda, Angola
- Products: Telecommunications services Internet services
- Revenue: —
- Number of employees: —
- Website: www.angolatelecom.ao

Angola Telecom is a telecommunications and Internet service provider of Angola. Angola Telecom is an empresa publica, i.e. wholly owned by the Angolan state.

Subsidiaries of Angola Telecom include:

- Infrasat, offering satellite telecommunications services.
- Angola Cables, offering international access for data and voice.
- TVCabo, offering broad band cable service for television and radio broadcasting.
- Multitel, a portal offering a wide range of internet services.
- ELTA, Empresa de Listas Telefonicas de Angola, an online telephone directory.
- Movicel, offering mobile telecommunications services.

Angola Telecom created the mobile phone provider Movicel as subsidiary, but holds since 2010 only a minority part of the shares of Movicel.

In 2010 Angola Telecom began a program of restructuring led by a team of international consultants. In 2014, Bloomberg reported that the company was on track to produce its first net profit in over 8 years. However, the economic collapse fueled by the devaluation of crude oil has likely erased any gains achieved thus far.

== See also ==
- MSTelcom telecommunications provider of Sonangol
- Movicel mobile phone provider
- Unitel (Angola) mobile phone provider
