= Congo Canyon =

African submarine canyon at the end of the Congo River

Coordinates: 5°59′S 11°44′E

Location near Africa

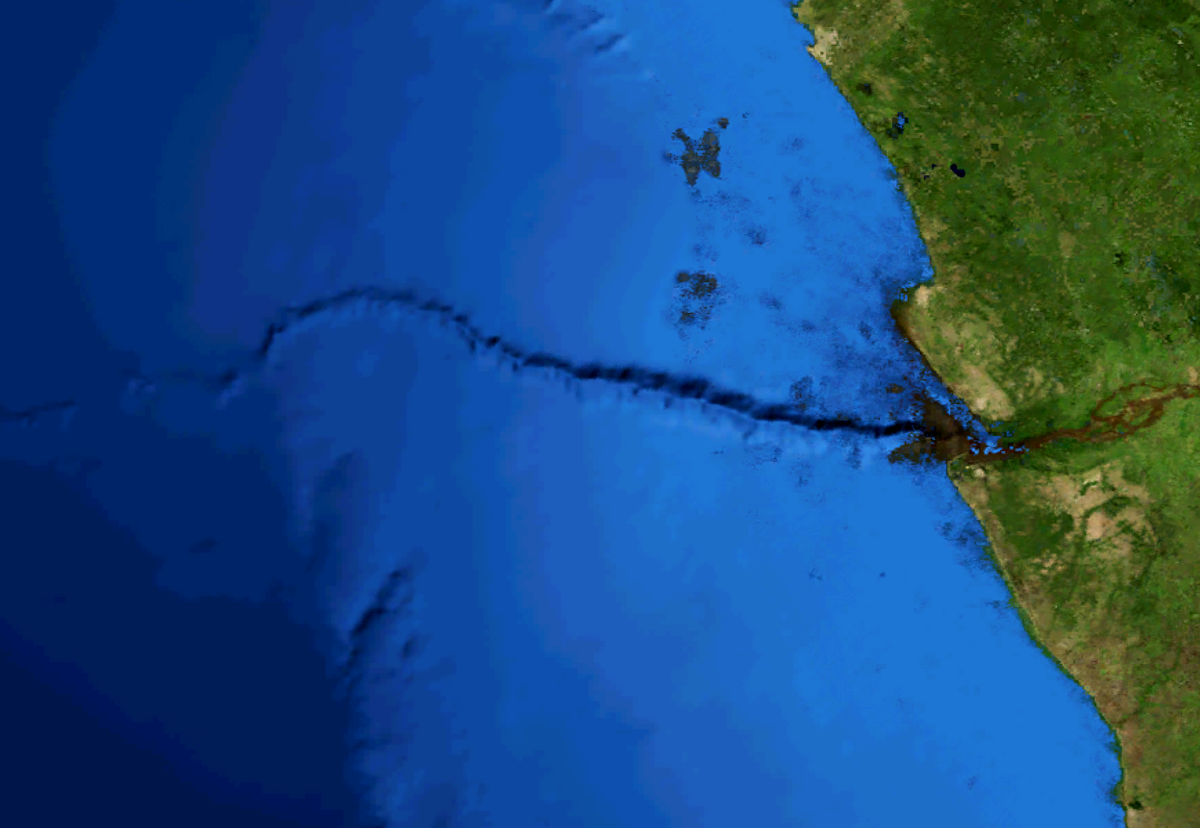
Satellite image of Congo Canyon in the Atlantic Ocean off the coast of Africa

The Congo Canyon is a submarine canyon found at the end of the Congo River in Africa. It is one of the largest submarine canyons in the world.

== Size ==
The canyon begins inland on the continent, partway up the Congo Estuary, and starts at a depth of 21 meters. It cuts across the entire continental shelf for 85 kilometers until it reaches the shelf edge, then continues down the slope and ends 280 km from where it started. At its deepest point, the V-shaped canyon walls are 1,100 meters tall, and the maximum width of the canyon is about 9 miles (14 km). At the bottom of the continental slope, it enters the Congo deep-sea fan and extends for an additional 220 km.

== Turbidity currents ==
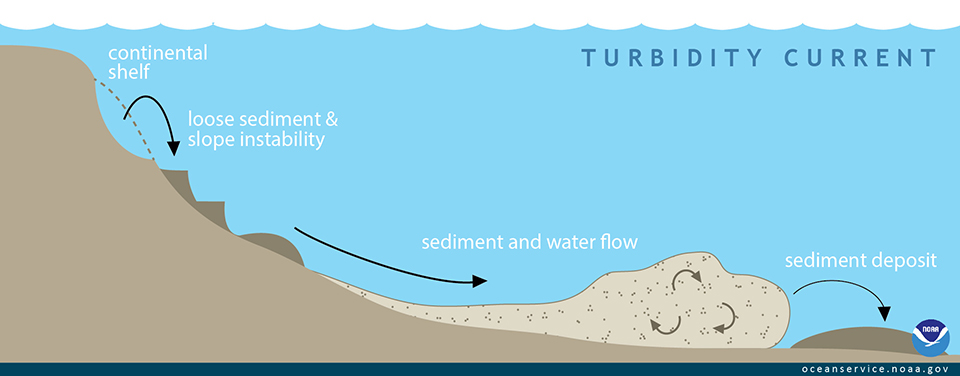
Turbidity current diagram

The turbidity currents found in the Congo Canyon are the strongest measured in the world. These are essentially underwater avalanches that can propagate for hundreds of kilometers, and their strength and frequency correlate strongly with the period of highest outflow from the Congo River. Their speeds vary from about 0.7 m/s to 3.5 m/s and events can last for more than a week. These currents are the major source of erosion in the canyon and represent a significant portion of the sediment that ends up in the fan at the end of the canyon. They commonly destroy equipment laid on the bottom of the ocean and have destroyed telegraph cables and moorings.

== Congo Deep-Sea Fan ==
The Congo Deep-Sea Fan accounts for a surface of about 300,000 km^{2} and at least 0.7 Mkm^{3} of Cenozoic sediments, becoming one of the largest submarine fan systems in the world. The fan extends over 1000 km from the Congo-Angola coast and was developed after the early Cretaceous rifting. The sediments include quartz grains.

The connection through the Congo submarine canyon allowed the direct transfer of terrestrial materials to the abyssal zone of the fan system. Unlike other rivers that empty into the sea, the Congo River is not building a delta because essentially all of its sediments are carried by turbidity currents via the submarine canyon to the fan. This accumulation is probably the greatest in the world for a currently active submarine system. The fan is built up by sediment gravity flows and other submarine mass movements, but also represents a very large active turbidite system. Although there exists a net up-canyon bottom current due to upwelling, these events overwhelm the normal bottom flow and ensure continued deposition.
