= Mtunzini =

- Location within KwaZulu-Natal Location within South Africa
- Coordinates: 28°57′S 31°45′E
- Country: South Africa
- Province: KwaZulu-Natal
- District: King Cetshwayo
- Municipality: uMlalazi

Area
  - Total: 10.43 km^{2} (4.03 sq mi)

Population (2011)
  - Total: 2,199
  - Density: 210.8/km^{2} (546.1/sq mi)

Racial makeup (2011)
  - Black African: 25.1%
  - Coloured: 1.2%
  - Indian/Asian: 1.3%
  - White: 72.0%
  - Other: 0.4%

First languages (2011)
  - English: 48.9%
  - Afrikaans: 33.5%
  - Zulu: 14.6%
  - Other: 2.9%
- Time zone: UTC+2 (SAST)
- PO box: 3867
- Area code: 035

Mtunzini (Zulu: eMthunzini, from umthunzi meaning "a place in the shade") is a small coastal town that is situated almost exactly halfway along KwaZulu-Natal's coastline in South Africa approximately 140 km north of Durban. In 2011, the town's population was 2,199.

== Name ==
The name is a word in the Zulu language meaning place in the shade.

== History ==
After the breakup of the Zulu Kingdom after the Anglo-Zulu War, Sir Garnet Wolseley created 13 'kinglets' - with two strategically located as buffer zones between Port Natal and Zululand. One of these kinglets was John Dunn who used Mtunzini as his capital.

In 1948, 9 square kilometres of dune forests, lakes and lagoon at Mtunzini was proclaimed a nature reserve known as the Umlalazi Nature Reserve. This area falls under the protection of the Ezemvelo KZN Wildlife (previously known as Natal Parks Board). The Umlalazi Lagoon is a popular tourist attraction for watersports enthusiasts and fishermen alike. Recreational and commercial ski-boat fishermen also launch their boats in the lagoon to head for the Indian Ocean via the mouth of the Umlalazi River.

In 2002, Mtunzini became a landing point for the SAFE state of the art Optical fiber Submarine communications cable, linking Melkbosstrand to the West with Saint Paul (Réunion), Baie Jacotet (Mauritius), Cochin (India) and Penang (Malaysia).

In 2009, Mtunzini became a landing point for the SEACOM cable, and in 2010 Mtunzini became the landing point for the EASSy cable.

== Tourism ==
Mtunzini is a bird watchers paradise and is renowned as one of the few places where one of South Africa's rarest birds of prey, the palm-nut vulture, is found. These birds feed on the fruit of the rafia palm which produces its fruit once every twenty years before dying. Visitors can enjoy a walk through the lush vegetation at the Rafia Palm Monument, which features a raised boardwalk that meanders through to the palms.

Mtunzini boasts, among other attractions, pristine beaches, a 9-hole golf course at the Mtunzini Country Club, AA-Event and Guest House, numerous bed-and-breakfast establishments as well as a range of camping, caravanning and other self-contained holiday accommodations. The beach is not protected by shark nets due to Mtunzini's proximity to a shark breeding ground populated by Zambezi sharks as well as many others. This fact notwithstanding, the waves at Mtunzini are described by surfers as being some of the better ones to surf on the North Coast.

== Gallery ==
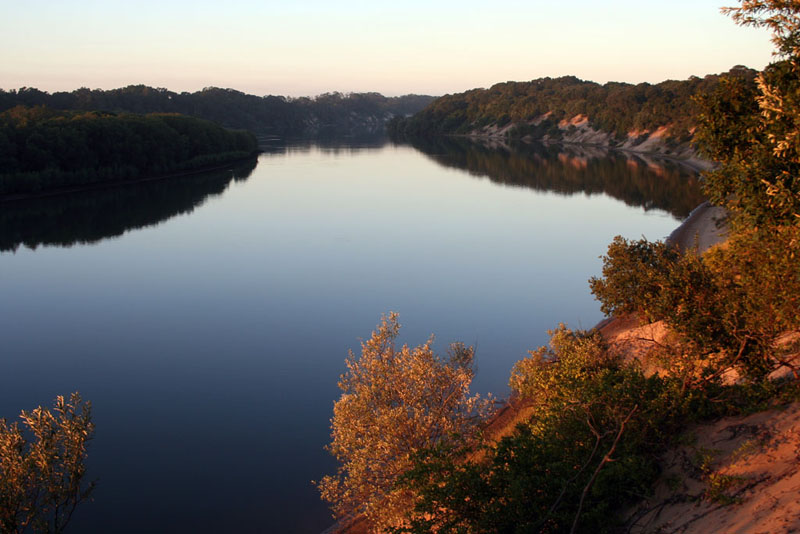
Umlalazi Lagoon at dusk

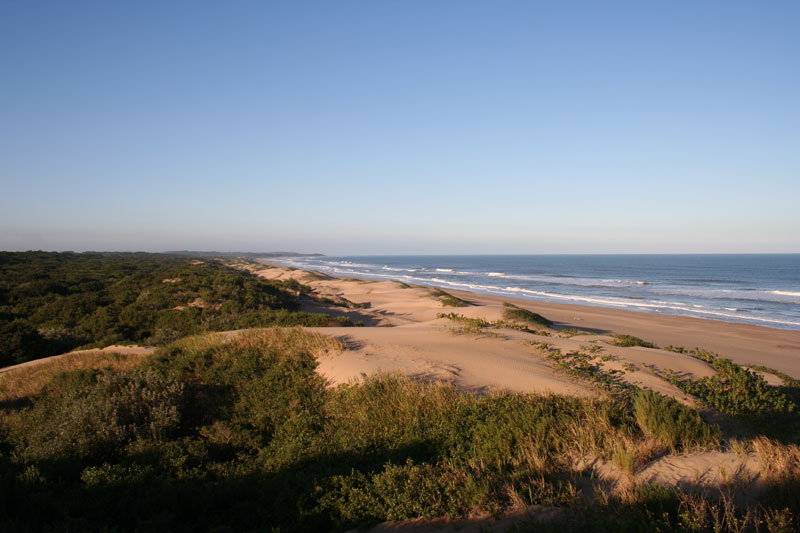
Mtunzini Beach

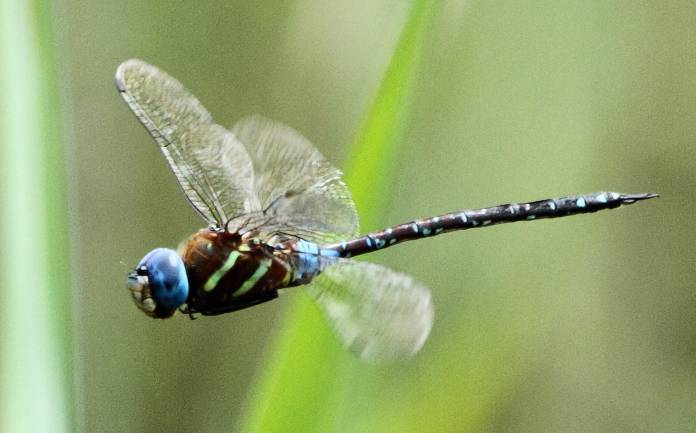
Anaciaeschna triangulifera
