= SEACOM (African cable system) =

African submarine communications cable

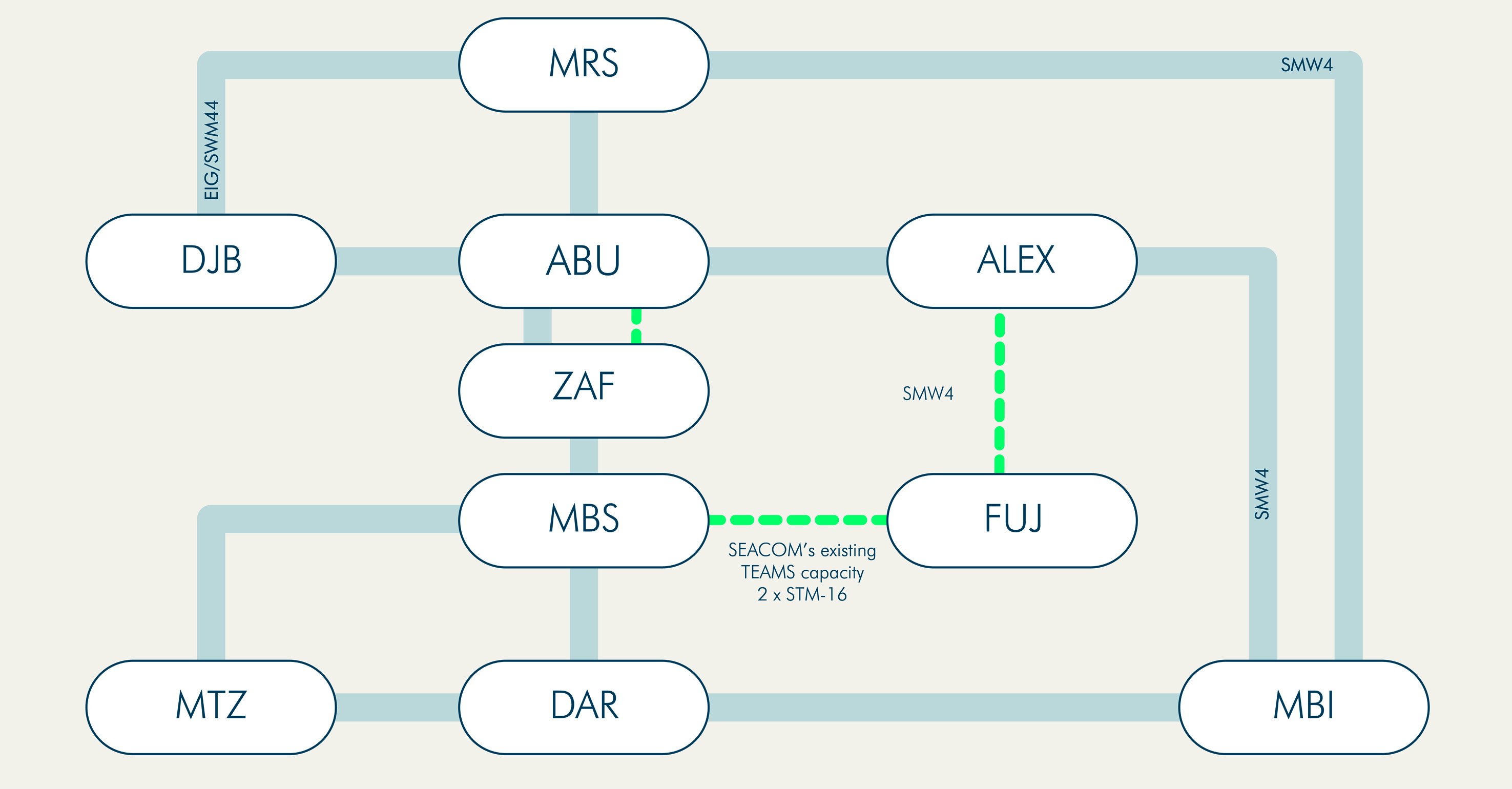
- Owners: 50% Industrial Promotion Services; 10% Remgro; 10% Sanlam; 20% Convergence Partners; 10% Brian Herlihy
- Key people: Alpheus Mangale; Group Chief Executive Officer
- Landing points see the landing points section
- Total length: 17,000 kilometres (10,563 mi)
- Design capacity: 12 Tbit/s
- Currently lit capacity: 4.2 Tbit/s
- Technology: Fiber optics
- Date of first use: July 23, 2009; 17 years ago
- Website: seacom.com

SEACOM's logo

SEACOM launched Africa's first broadband submarine cable system along the continent's Southern coasts in 2009. SEACOM is privately owned and operated.

== Technology and cable structure ==
A cross section of the shore-end of a modern submarine communications cable. 1 – Polyethylene 2 – Mylar tape 3 – Stranded steel wires 4 – Aluminium water barrier 5 – Polycarbonate 6 – Copper or aluminium tube 7 – Petroleum jelly 8 – Optical fibers

Fibre-optic pairs are provided from Mtunzini to France to a point of presence (PoP) in Marseille, as well as from Tanzania to India into a PoP in Mumbai.

SEACOM has also built an on-net European network, managed and operated by themselves, to deliver transport layer, internet protocol (IP), and multiprotocol label switching (MPLS) services to the following cities in Europe:

- Amsterdam, Netherlands
- Frankfurt, Germany
- London, United Kingdom
- Marseille, France
- Slough, United Kingdom

Through third-party networks in Europe, SEACOM also delivers these services to other locations in Europe not covered in the list of cities above.

The SEACOM cable is deployed with a mixture of double armour cable, single armour cable, special protection cable (with a metallic wrap below the insulator, rather than steel wires), and lightweight cable without armour, used in deep waters. Shallower water cable typically has more protective armour than offshore, deeper cable.

The cable is a loose tube design that determines the amount and relative location along the transmission path of each type of fibre. Multiple fibre types are used in the cable: dispersion-shifted and non-zero dispersion-shifted.

The repeaters are optical amplifier repeaters, using erbium-doped amplifiers. There are over 150 repeaters in the SEACOM system. They are spaced along the cable many tens of kilometres apart with the distance between repeaters varying depending on the segment in the system. Repeater spacing is determined by a variety of factors, including the transmission capacity of the fibres in the cable and the distance between cable landing points.

On 23 July 2009, the 17,000 kilometres (11,000 mi) cable began operations, providing the eastern and southern African countries of Djibouti, Kenya, Tanzania, Mozambique, and South Africa with high-speed Internet connectivity to Europe and Asia. The cable was officially switched on in simultaneous events held across the region, in Mombasa, Kenya, and Dar es Salaam, Tanzania.

On 4 August 2020, SEACOM announced that it would more than double the capacity on its fibre-optic network by the end of August 2020. The continent's first broadband submarine cable system operator will add 1.7 Tbit/s to its network, bringing its total capacity to 3.2 Tbit/s along Africa's eastern and Southern coasts. It has ownership of Africa’s most extensive ICT data infrastructure.

== Funding ==
SEACOM is privately funded, and approximately 75% Southeastern and South African-owned. Initial private investment in the SEACOM project was US$375 million: $75 million from the developers, $150 million from private South African investors, and $75 million as a commercial loan from Nedbank (South Africa). The remaining $75 million was provided by Industrial Promotion Services (IPS), which is the industrial and infrastructure arm of the Aga Khan Fund for Economic Development. The IPS investment was funded by $15 million in equity, and a total of $60.4 million in debt from the Emerging Africa Infrastructure Fund and the FMO (Netherlands).

Current ownership structure is as follows: 30% IPS, 30% Remgro, 15% Sanlam, 15% Fund Convergence Partners, and 10% by Brian Herlihy.

The cable is variously described as a $600 and a $650 million project, and has seen a number of upgrades to landing station infrastructure, national backhaul and increases to carrying capacity, with an increase to 2.6 terabits per second (Tbit/s) in May 2012, and then to 12 Tbit/s in 2014.

== Landing points ==
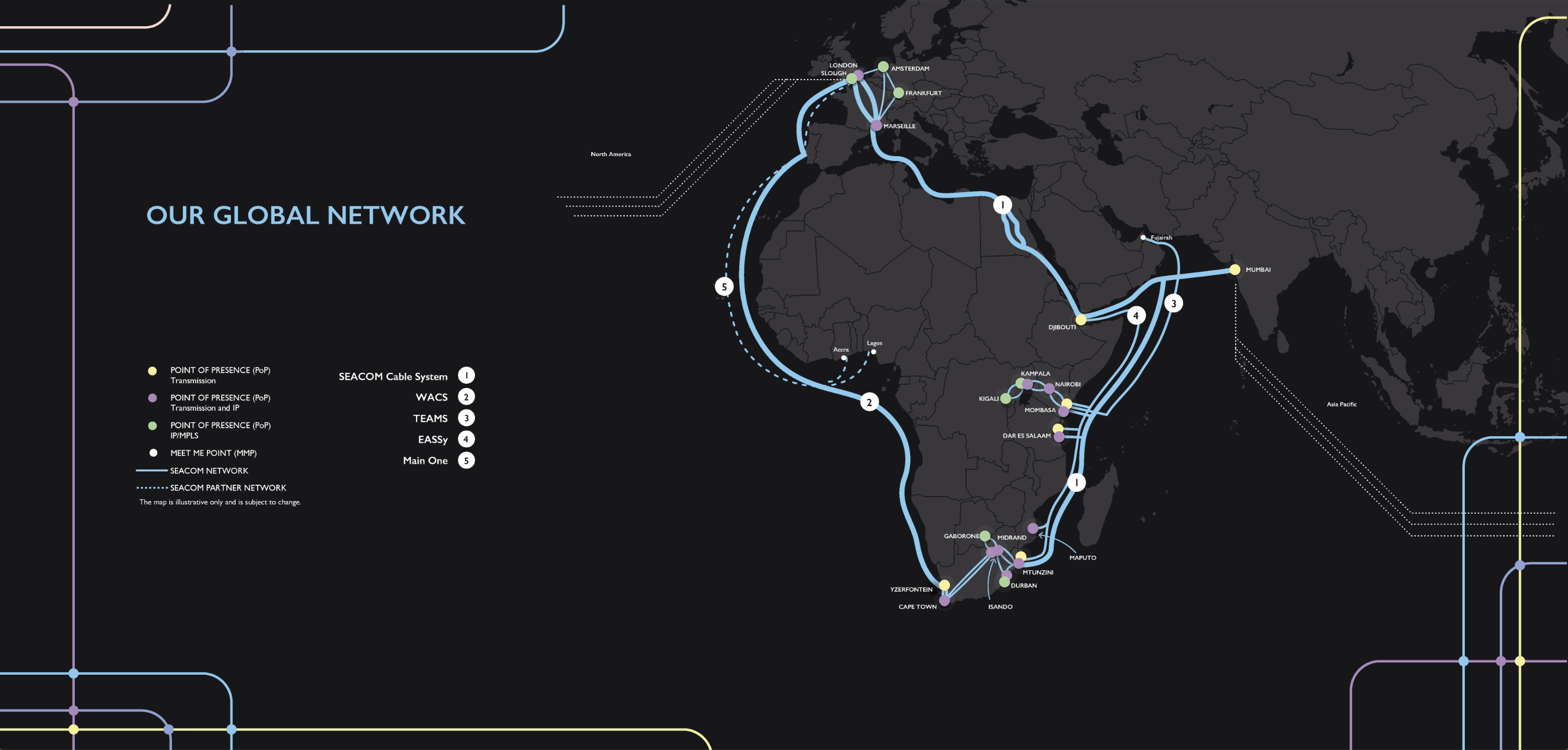
SEACOM Network Map

The cable landing points are:

- Marseille, France
- Djibouti
- Mombasa, Kenya
- Dar Es Salaam, Tanzania
- Maputo, Mozambique
- Mtunzini, South Africa
- Mumbai, India

SEACOM Partner Network landing points include:

- Yzerfontein, South Africa
- Lagos, Nigeria
- Accra, Ghana
- Fujairah, UAE

== See also ==
- SEACOM (Asian cable system)
- DARE (cable system)
- EASSy
- Internet in South Africa
- Main One
- TEAMS (cable system)
- WACS (cable system)
