= Melkbosstrand =

Seaside suburb of Cape Town, in Western Cape, South Africa

Melkbosstrand Melkbos
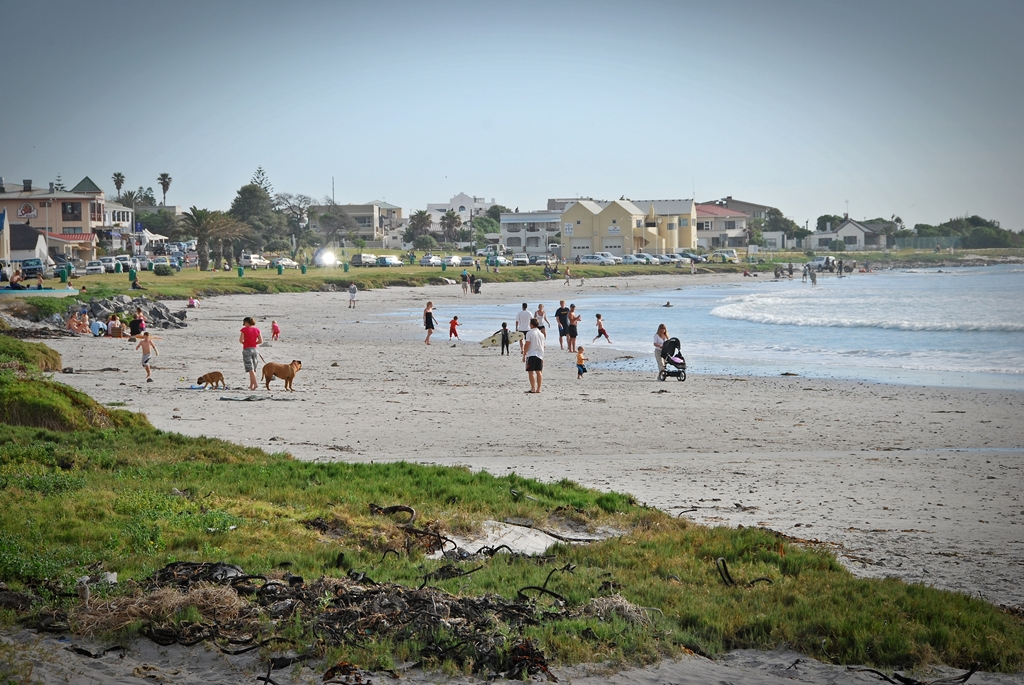
- Beach at Melkbosstrand
- Interactive map of Melkbosstrand
- Coordinates: 33°43′52″S 18°26′31″E
- Country: South Africa
- Province: Western Cape
- Municipality: City of Cape Town

Government
  - Councillor: Magrieta Jansen van Vuuren (DA)

Area
  - Total: 35.64 km^{2} (13.76 sq mi)

Population (2011)
  - Total: 11,586
  - Density: 325.1/km^{2} (842.0/sq mi)

Racial makeup (2011)
  - Black African: 7.8%
  - Coloured: 10.0%
  - Indian/Asian: 0.6%
  - White: 80.5%
  - Other: 1.0%

First languages (2011)
  - Afrikaans: 51.5%
  - English: 43.4%
  - Xhosa: 1.4%
  - Other: 3.8%
- Time zone: UTC+2 (SAST)
- Postal code (street): 7441
- PO box: 7437
- Area code: 021

Melkbosstrand (Afrikaans for "Milkbush beach") is a coastal town located on the South West Coast of South Africa, 30 km north of Cape Town. It forms part of the City of Cape Town Metropolitan Municipality, the municipality governing Cape Town and its greater metropolitan area.

Named after the species of Euphorbiaceae bushes which grow on the dunes and give off a milky latexlike substance, it is commonly referred to simply as Melkbos. The town and its 7 kilometre stretch of white sand beach is situated on the Atlantic coast with the Blouberg mountain to the east. The beach is popular with surfers. It is one of the landing points for the South Africa-Far East, South Atlantic/West Africa and Equinao submarine cable systems.

Melkbosstrand is along the Blaauwberg region of the City of Cape Town within which it became incorporated when metropolitan boundaries were redrawn, following the advent of democracy in 1994. Its nearest neighbouring towns are Blouberg to the south and Atlantis to the north-east. Melkbos is protected from urban development owing to its location in an expansive nature conservation zone to the South, insulating it from the Blouberg sprawl, and the security buffer zones of Koeberg nuclear power station to the North and today it remains a pristine seaside resort.

== History ==
Melkbosstrand (previously known as Lospers Bay (the surname Losper, a variant of Laubscher, see https://forebears.io/surnames/losper), or Losperd's Bay (meaning, in old Dutch: the Bay of Loose or Lost Horses) is the site of the Battle of Blaauwberg (1806) whereby the Cape ceased to be occupied by French-Batavian troops and became a Colony of the British Crown. The French had occupied the Cape from 1781 to 1783, after a fleet under the flag of celebrated admiral Bailli de Suffren anchored just north of Melkbosstrand. A cannon set on Melkbosstrand foreshore commemorates the battle itself. Numerous shipwrecks, some dating back to the Portuguese Discoverers of the Early Renaissance, are strewn along the coast of Melkbosstrand.

Ancient Khoi-San middens and stone-age archeological findings have provided research with numerous artifacts.

In terms of Colonial, Dutch vernacular architecture, the area boasts several fine examples. The farmhouse Melkbosch, the first established by the Dutch East India Company outside Cape Town, is still extant albeit in a rather poor condition following a fire. On Melkbos bay itself, much favored by the surfing community for its good swell and warmer currents, stands the Damhuis cottage (now a beach restaurant), a late 18th-century fisherman house and the last one of its kind in the area (apart from Ons Huisie, at Blouberg Beach, some five kilometres away).

In 1961, Melkbosstrand became the end point for the SAT-1 Copper cable between South Africa and Sesimbra, Portugal. In 1992, the cable was replaced by the SAT-2 fiber optic cable. Today, Melkbosstrand is still the landing point for the SAT-3/WASS undersea cable system.

It owes much of its present-day infrastructure to two significant South African apartheid government developments in the late seventies. The first, Koeberg nuclear power station, constructed with the help of the British and French some 6 km north of Melkbosstrand, necessitated the creation of high quality housing for the foreign contractors. The second, the government subsidised creation of Atlantis Diesel Engines (ADE), a joint venture between the British Perkins-Elmer and German Daimler AG brands, to bypass international sanctions imposed by United Nations Security Council Resolution 418.

Although ADE was in the industrial park of Atlantis, some 50 km north of Cape Town, subsidised housing was established in Melkbosstrand to help attract and retain the many German, British, and South African workers, including engineers, managers, and technicians. These houses, both for Koeberg and ADE, have long since been sold off to the public and now form a housing development with paved lanes, quaint housing, a club, and a library.

Melkbos features in Deon Meyer's best-selling crime novel 7 Days (7 Dae in Afrikaans original) (2012) as the place where mad sniper, cop-killer, Solomon buys spray paint for camouflage.

== Economy, culture and sport ==
For many years Melkbosstrand has been called the "rich man's town" by its neighbouring suburbs and towns, such as Atlantis and Table View. This labelling remark is probably because Melkbosstrand is home to a host of South African celebrities (retired rugby players, actors, writers, visiting members of the House of Lords), which is mainly due to its location and its views of Table Mountain. International best-selling novelist Deon Meyer was a long time resident of Melkbosstrand as well as South-African French philosopher Philippe-Joseph Salazar.

Wild life on Melkbos beaches has always been abundant: "The most unusual scene," writes Lawrence G. Green in South African Beachcomber, " came about when greedy seals chased thousands upon thousands of maasbankers into rocky pools on the coast to the north of Melkbosch Strand. Everyone in that village turned out with baskets, caught the fish by the hundred and carried them home alive". Crayfish or Cape lobster is plentiful although fishing is strictly regulated. Fish braais (barbecues) remain a favourite pastime among locals.
