= SAFE (cable system) =

Submarine communications cable system

South Africa Far East, SAFE
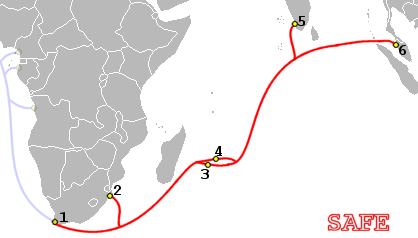
- Landing points: 1. Melkbosstrand, South Africa 2. Mtunzini, KwaZulu-Natal, South Africa (branch) 3. Saint-Paul, Réunion 4. Baie du Jacotet, Mauritius 5. Kochi, India (branch) 6. Penang, Malaysia
- Total length: 13,104 km
- Currently lit capacity: 440 Gigabits per second
- Technology: wavelength division multiplexing

The South Africa Far East cable is an optical fiber submarine communications cable linking Melkbosstrand, South Africa to Penang, Malaysia.

It was commissioned in 2002 and built by Tyco Submarine Systems of the United States with an initial capacity of 10 Gigabits per second, and current capacity of 440 Gigabits per second. It has four fiber strands, using Erbium-doped fiber amplifier repeaters and wavelength division multiplexing.

It has a total length of 13,104 kilometres (8,142 mi) and is one of a pair of cables—SAT-3/WASC being the other—that provides high-speed digital links between Europe, West and Southern Africa, and the Far East. Together with SAT-3/WASC, it also provides redundancy for other cables travelling through the Middle East.

It has landing points at:

1. Melkbosstrand, near Cape Town, Western Cape, South Africa (where it meets the SAT-2 and SAT-3 cable systems)
2. Mtunzini, KwaZulu-Natal, South Africa (branch)
3. Saint Paul, Réunion
4. Baie du Jacotet, Savanne, Mauritius
5. Kochi, India (branch) (where it meets the SEA-ME-WE 3 cable system)
6. Penang, Malaysia (where it meets the FLAG and SEA-ME-WE 3 cable systems)
