= Unitel (Angola) =

Telecommunications company in Angola

- Industry: Mobile telephony Fixed telephony Mobile Internet
- Genre: Telecommunications
- Founded: 30 December 1998; 27 years ago (constitution); 8 March 2001; 25 years ago (launch)
- Headquarters: Talatona,Luanda, Angola
- Area served: Angola
- Products: GSM; 3G; GPRS; EDGE; UMTS; LTE; 4G; 5G
- Parent: Sonangol (50%) Government of Angola (50%)
- Website: http://www.unitel.co.ao/

Unitel S.A. is a private Angolan mobile phone company which was established on 8 March 2001 as a joint-stock company. The company is owned by the Angolan state, having been nationalised in 2022.

== Operations and location ==
The seat of the company is Luanda. It has about 2.000 employees and a network coverage nearly in all the provincial municipalities since 2002.

Unitel sells its services via a network of shops; recharging cards for pre-paid contracts are also sold by individual street sellers all over Angola. Prepaid cards can also be recharged via the Multicaixa network of ATM's. Unitel claims to have 9 million customers out of a population of estimated 18 to 20 million people.

== Network ==
Unitel operates a network based on GSM and UMTS standards, and provides voice communications, text (SMS) and multimedia (MMS) messages, and mobile internet access. Contracts are available as post-paid and pre-paid. Since December 2011, Unitel covers all Angolan municipalities, by installing a transmitter in Rivungo, Kuando Kubango province; a station which is operated by solar power.

== Tariff ==
The tariff is calculated in UTT (Unidade Tarifária de Telecomunicações - Telecommunication Tariff Units), a common tariff unit used by all telecommunication companies in Angola. The price of one UTT was 10 Kwanzas in 2016. Recharging cards are available with 125 UTT, 375 UTT, 625 UTT and 1250 UTT for 900 Kwanzas respectively 2700 Kwanzas etc. Post-paid contracts can also be paid by bank transfer or direct debit from a bank account. The Unitel phone numbers begin with 92, 93 and 94.

== Ownership and nationalisation ==
The company was previously owned by Oi and Helios (through Africatel), Angolan state-owned oil company Sonangol and local firms like Geni holding (through Mercury), and Vidatel owned by Isabel dos Santos, each holding 25% of Unitel.

In October 2022, Angolan President João Lourenço issued a decision finalising the nationalising of Unitel, ending the links of Isabel dos Santos, the daughter of Angolan longtime ex-president, with the operator.

== See also ==
- Movicel
