= Cable landing point =

Location where a submarine cable or other underwater cable makes landfall

A cable landing point is the location where a submarine or other underwater cable makes landfall. The term is most often used for the landfall points of submarine telecommunications cables and submarine power cables. The landing will either be direct (in the case of a point-to-point cable system) or via a branch from a main cable using a submarine branching unit. The branch can be several kilometres long.

A landing point of SEA-ME-WE 4 on Cox's Bazar in Bangladesh

== Selection criteria ==
Cable landing points are usually carefully chosen to be in areas:

1. that have little marine traffic to minimise the risk of cables being damaged by ship anchors and trawler operations;
2. with gently sloping, sandy or silty sea-floors so that the cable can be buried to minimise the chance of damage;
3. without strong currents that would uncover buried cables and potentially move cables.

Such locations are rare, and will usually be the shared landfall point for several cable systems.

== Associated facilities ==
Frequently, there will be a nearby cable landing station, or cable termination station, which may well be shared between multiple cable systems, but in some cases, the cable may be laid many miles inland before reaching its termination point.

A cable landing station may or may not be required, depending on whether, for example, the submarine cable requires power in order to provide power to submarine repeaters or amplifiers. The voltages applied to the cables can be high—3,000 to 4,000 volts for a typical trans-Atlantic telecommunications cable system, and 1,000 volts for a cross-channel telecommunications cable system. Submarine power cables can operate at many kilovolts: for example, the Fenno-Skan power cable operates at 400 kV DC

A cable termination station is the point at which the submarine cable connects into the land-based infrastructure or network. A cable termination station may be the same facility as the cable landing station, or may be many miles away. The termination station will usually be the point where high-capacity 'backhaul' land-based network connects to areas of high demand, which are usually centres of high population density, rather than the usually remote locations of cable landing points/landing stations/termination stations. A good example of this is the Endeavour cable system which connects Australia to Hawaii. The cable landing point in Sydney is Tamarama Beach, four kilometres from the cable termination station in Paddington.

For power cables the term cable termination station is not strictly determined. It is either the point where the underwater cable ends and where the overhead powerline starts or if the whole line is implemented as cable, the first cable sleeve on the land. The substation or HVDC static inverter plant where the connection to the grid is established can also be described as a cable termination station; however, this station may be located far from the coast.

== Notable landing points ==
- Blaabjerg, Denmark, where the following cables come ashore:
  - CANTAT-3
  - DANICE
  - ODIN
  - TAT-14
  - UK-Denmark 4
- Changi, Singapore, where the following cables come ashore:
  - APCN
  - ASEAN
  - C2C
  - TIISCS
  - TIS
- Chennai, India, where the following cables come ashore:
  - i2i
  - SEA-ME-WE 4
  - TIISCS
  - BRICS
  - Bay of Bengal Gateway
  - Gulf Bridge International
- Darwin, Northern Territory
  - Bosun
  - Asia Connect
  - Haiwaiki Nue 1
- Wall Township, New Jersey, where the following cables come ashore:
  - HAVFRUE AEC-2
  - Seabras-1
  - TGN1 and TGN2
- Widemouth Bay, near Bude in Cornwall, UK, where several submarine telecommunications cables come ashore:
  - 2Africa
  - Amitie
  - Apollo (North)
  - Europe India Gateway
  - GLO-1
  - Grace Hopper
  - Pan European Crossing
  - TAT-8
  - TAT-14
  - Yellow (AC2)

== See also ==
- Static inverter plant
- List of international submarine communications cables
- List of domestic submarine communications cables
