= Jorge Eduardo Acosta =

Argentine military captain

Jorge Eduardo Acosta (born 27 May 1941), alias "el Tigre" ("The Tiger") is an Argentine corvette captain, head of Task Group (Grupo de Tareas) 3.3.2 of the ESMA naval school and in charge of this detention center during the Operation Condor. He took decisions concerning torture and assassinations in the ESMA center. In 2011, he was sentenced to life imprisonment for the murders of the French nuns Léonie Duquet and Alice Domon, and of the Mothers of the Plaza de Mayo Azucena Villaflor, Esther Ballestrino and María Ponce, as well as of the death of the Swedish-Argentine teenager Dagmar Hagelin and of Argentine journalist and fiction writer Rodolfo Walsh. In total, he is accused of approximately 80 crimes.

== Biography ==
Jorge Acosta travelled in 1981 to South Africa to assist the apartheid government as a military instructor in matters of counter-insurgency. In 1998, it was discovered that he had a secret Swiss bank account which may have been used to keep goods stolen from the "desaparecidos".

He was amnestied under the Ley de Obediencia Debida, then arrested again and remained in preventive detention for his role in the case of stolen babies. After the repeal of the amnesty laws in 2003, the cases against him were re-opened. In August 2006, the Argentine justice decided to take the ESMA case, in which Jorge Eduardo Acosta is to be judged along with Alfredo Astiz and Adolfo Miguel Donda.

He is also accused in Italy for crimes committed during the dictatorship against Italian citizens.

He was sentenced to life imprisonment by an Argentinian court on October 26, 2011.

He was sentenced to 30 years imprisonment by an Argentinian court on July 5, 2012, for the systematic theft of babies from political prisoners.
