= Ángela Auad =

Argentine social activist

- Born: February 1945; Jujuy, Argentina
- Died: 1977
- Occupation: Student
- Notable work: Argentine social activist and she worked with the Mothers of the Plaza de Mayo

Ángela Auad (born February 1945; "disappeared" 17 or 18 December 1977) was an Argentine social activist. She worked with the Mothers of the Plaza de Mayo (Madres de Plaza de Mayo) to locate victims of forced disappearance during the Dirty War. Because of her activism, she was kidnapped, tortured and murdered.

== Political activism ==
Auad was first arrested when she was a college student in Tucumán; she was released in mid-1975. In 1976, her husband Roberto Genoves was imprisoned in Chaco Province. Because of this, Auad came into contact with the Relatives of Those Disappeared and Detained for Political Reasons (Familiares de Desaparecidos y Detenidos por Razones Políticas) and the Mothers of the Plaza de Mayo, who were seeking to find their children.

== Disappearance ==
Between Thursday, 8 December and Saturday, 10 December 1977, a group of soldiers under the command of Alfredo Astiz kidnapped a group of twelve people linked to the Mothers of Plaza de Mayo.1 Among them was Angela Auad, together with the founding mothers of Mothers of Plaza de Mayo Azucena Villaflor, Esther Ballestrino and María Ponce, and the French nuns Alice Domon and Léonie Duquet.

Ángela was kidnapped on 8 December with most of the group in the Santa Cruz Church, located in the San Cristóbal neighbourhood of the city of Buenos Aires, where they used to meet.

She was taken directly to the clandestine detention centre located in the Navy Petty-Officers School of Mechanics (Escuela Superior de Mecánica de la Armada, ESMA), under the control of the Argentine Navy, where she was held in the area called "Capucha". She remained there for approximately ten days, during which time she was constantly tortured. In the Report Never Again, the witnesses Maggio and Cubas, survivors of the ESMA, (Note: "Maggio managed to escape on 17 March 1978. During the following months he dedicated himself to denouncing everything he saw and learned during his captivity, to inform the families of the hostages where their loved ones were, and not even [sic.] He was deprived of calling the sailors who had tortured him to insult them, and he fell again on 4 October 1978. But they did not succeed in kidnapping him alive, he resisted and an army gang killed him and his body was transferred to the ESMA, where Acosta exposed him to the other hostages. " (Page 12. The testimonies of Maggio gave them to publicity in 1978 to different news agencies.) reported what they knew about their fate:

The same happened with the French religious Alice Domon and Leonie Renée Duquet. I had a personal opportunity to talk with Sister Alice, as she was taken along with Sister Renée to the third floor of the ESMA Official Casino, where I was held captive. This occurs around December 11 or 12. It is when she tells me that she had been kidnapped in a church, together with relatives of the disappeared. Then I learned that there were 13 people ... Then they were "moved" along with the eleven remaining people. The internal rumours based on the haste with which these people were taken from there, indicated the murder of the same. (Testimony of Horacio Domingo Maggio, File No. 4450)

Probably on 17 or 18 December 1977, Ángela and the rest of the group were "transferred" to the military airport located at the southern end of the Aeroparque in the city of Buenos Aires, boarding a Navy plane and sedated. Somewhere off the coast of Santa Teresita, they were thrown from the plane, dying upon hitting the water. On 20 December 1977 unidentified bodies began to wash up on beaches south of Buenos Aires. Some were buried in mass graves at General Lavalle Cemetery about 400 kilometres south of the capital. It was later confirmed that the military threw prisoners from planes and helicopters to kill them after torture.

In July 2005, a mass grave with remains of several women was exhumed. Forensic DNA testing established the identities of Auad and other women kidnapped with her, including Duquet and Villaflor.

Auad was buried in the garden of Santa Cruz Church alongside Léonie Duquet, Esther Ballestrino de Careaga, and María Ponce de Bianca.

== Identification of her body and burial ==
On 20 December 1977, corpses from the sea began to appear on the beaches of the province of Buenos Aires at the height of the spas of Santa Teresita and Mar del Tuyú. The police doctors who examined the bodies at that time recorded that the cause of death had been "the clash against hard objects from high altitude," as indicated by the type of bone fractures observed, which occurred before death. the local authorities immediately arranged for the bodies to be buried as NN ('No Name') in the cemetery of the nearby city of General Lavalle.

In 1984, in the framework of the investigation of the CONADEP and the Trial to the Boards, excavations had been carried out in the General Lavalle cemetery, finding a large quantity of skeletal remains from the corpses found on the beaches of San Bernardo and Lucila del Mar. These remains were used in the trial of the Boards and then stored in 16 bags.

From then on Judge Horacio Cattani began to accumulate causes about disappeared. Despite the laws of Full Stop and Due Obedience, which paralysed the investigation, Cattani managed to arm in 1995 a file of 40 square meters to house all these tests.

In 2003, the mayor of General Lavalle reported that new NN tombs had been located in the cemetery of the city. The judge then ordered Cattani make new excavations with Argentine Forensic Anthropology Team (EAAF), being discovered two lines of tombs, one above the other. 8 skeletons were discovered, five corresponding to women, two corresponding to men and one, classified as GL-17, which was defined as "probably male".

Cattani sent the bones to the Laboratory of Immunogenetics and Molecular Diagnostics (LIDMO) of Córdoba, belonging to the EAAF. The results of the laboratory were determining that the remains belonged to the group of hostages between 8 and 10 December 1977. On 15 September 2005, Judge Cattani received the report stating that one of the individualised remains belonged to Angela Auad.

On 25 September 2005, 28 years after she was murdered, Angela Auad was buried in the garden of the Church of Santa Cruz, in Buenos Aires, next to Sister Léonie Duquet, one of the French nuns who were kidnapped with her. Previously the mothers of Plaza de Mayo Esther Ballestrino and María Ponce were buried there as well. The ashes of Azucena Villaflor were scattered in the Plaza de Mayo.

== Knowledge and concealment by the government of the United States ==
Secret documents of the United States government declassified in 2002 prove that the US government knew since 1978 that the bodies of French nuns Alice Domon and Léonie Duquet and the mothers of Plaza de Mayo Azucena Villaflor, Esther Ballestrino and María Ponce had been found on the beaches of Buenos Aires. This information was kept secret and was never communicated to the Argentine government.

The information is included in Document No. 1978-BUENOS-02346, directed by the then US Ambassador to Argentina, Raúl Castro, to the Secretary of State of the United States, dated 30 March 1978 and mentioned as an object "Report about dead nuns. " Textually the document says:

1. A.F.P. March 28 History compiled in Paris reports that the bodies of two French nuns (Alicia Doman and Renee Duguet) who were kidnapped in mid-December with eleven other human rights activists were identified among the bodies near Bahía Blanca. 2. Buenos Aires was full of certain rumours from a month ago about records of the discovery of a number of corpses brought to the beach by unusually strong winds along the Atlantic sea at points near the mouth of the Río de la Plata about 300- 350 miles north of Bahía Blanca (See Buenos Aires 1919 for control) 3. (Section in deleted) that was trying to track these rumours has confidential information that the nuns were kidnapped by Argentine security agents and at some point they were transferred to the town of Junín which is located about 150 miles west of Buenos Aires. 4. The Embassy also has confidential information obtained through a source (protected) of the Argentine government that seven bodies were discovered a few weeks ago on the Atlantic beach near Mar del Plata. According to this source, the bodies were those of the two nuns and five mothers who disappeared between 8 and 10 December 1977. Our source confirms that these individuals were abducted by members of the security forces acting under their broad mandate against terrorists and subversives. The source also stated that few individuals in the GOA were aware of this information. 5. This source has been truthfully informed in the past and we have reason to believe that it has knowledge about disappearance issues. The Embassy requests that your report be protected to avoid compromising a source that has proven useful in providing information concerning lost or missing individuals. CASTRO7
