= Luis María Mendía =

Argentine admiral (1925–2007)

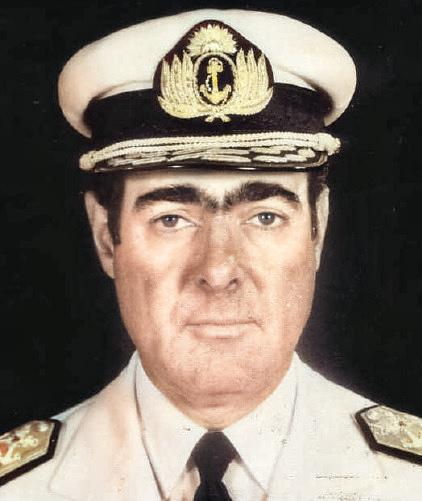
Luis María Mendía

Luis María Mendía (April 21, 1925 – May 13, 2007) was the Argentine Chief of Naval Operations in 1976-77, with the rank of vice-admiral. According to confessions gathered by Horacio Verbitsky and made by Adolfo Scilingo (later sentenced to 640 years in prison in Spain), Luis María Mendía was the architect of the "death flight" assassination method (vuelos de la muerte) whereby the Argentine state disappeared people by throwing them out of aircraft over the ocean, thus making the retrieval of their corpses nearly impossible (and thus subsequent legal investigations unlikely). This method was set out in the Plancitara military plan of 1975, during Isabel Perón's government.

Luis María Mendía did not benefit from the amnesty laws enacted during the transition to democracy (full stop law and law of due obedience) but from an amnesty declared by president Carlos Menem in October 1989. However, he appeared before the courts for his role in the ESMA case, one of the largest concentration camps and torture centers used by the military. The ESMA case was reopened by the Argentine courts following the Supreme Court's 2003 decision declaring the amnesty laws anti-constitutional. Under house arrest because of his age (82 years old), in 2007 Luis María Mendía finally admitted before magistrate Sergio Torres "full responsibility" for the security forces under his direction. He called his subordinates "heroes". He was also questioned in the case of the disappearances of two French nuns, Alice Domon and Léonie Duquet, in which Alfredo Astiz (alias "Angel of Death") is also being prosecuted.

== 1970s ==
Two weeks before the military coup d'état of March 24, 1976, Luis María Mendía gathered naval officers on March 10, under the orders of Admiral and head of military forces Emilio Massera, to prepare the repression against subversive delinquents. On March 24, the day of the coup, he held another meeting, at which he theorized about the tactics used during the Dirty War, including the use of torture and of death flights. He also theorized the theft of babies, taken from their mothers and given to military families. Mendia was known as "The Christian," as he liked to say to his colleagues: "Struggle against everything which is against western and Christian ideology"

== Plancitara document ==
Sharing the same lawyer as Alfredo Astiz, Mendía was questioned by judges in 2007 concerning the ESMA case. ESMA was one of the most important torture centers of Jorge Rafael Videla's junta. During his testimony, he talked about the Placintara (PLAN Capacitación contra Insurgencia Terrorista de la Armada de la República Argentina, Argentine Navy plan against insurgency and terrorism) plan, a document signed by him in 1975 and for which he took responsibility, that organized the repression legitimized by the junta, in particular the death flights (openly stating: "physical elimination by using planes which, in flight, would throw out the prisoners drugged beforehand'. The Placintara document was possible because of Isabel Perón's "anti-subversion decrees" signed before her overthrow in 1976 by Videla. Mendía's point was to show that the repression had started well before Videla's coup.

Critics accused him of trying to legitimize the military National Reorganization Process junta, as already done during the 1985 Juicio a las Juntas. Mendía claimed that "Act 20840 [by Isabel Peron's government] and decrees then dictated appears to have served, according to my judgment, as legalization of the actions" carried out. "The military forces, the security and police forces did not invent anything on March 24, 1976 [date of the coup], nor after this date," he declared. His juridical strategy thus clearly appeared to be in claiming that the crimes committed were in fact covered by a de jure government, which is hotly contested by human rights supporters.

Luis María Mendía insisted on responsibilities before the 1976 coup, citing the names of two desaparecidos kidnapped before the coup: Héctor Aldo Fagetti Gallego, for which Isabel Perón was arrested in early 2007, and of French citizen Maurice Jeaguer. But he remained silent on the "death flights."

== Alleged French cooperation ==
Luis María Mendía testified in January 2007, before the Argentine judges, that a French intelligence "agent," Bertrand de Perseval, had participated in the abduction of the two French nuns. Perseval, who lives today in Thailand, denied any links with the abduction, but did admit being a former member of the Organisation armée secrète (OAS), and having escaped for Argentina after the March 1962 Evian Accords putting an end to the Algerian War (1954–62). French intelligence agents have long been suspected of having trained their Argentine counterparts in counter-insurgency techniques (involving massive use of torture, as experimented during the Algerian War). Referring to Marie Monique Robin's film documentary titled The Death Squads - the French School (Les escadrons de la mort - l'école française), which demonstrated that the French intelligence services had trained Argentine counterparts in counter-insurgency technics, Luis María Mendía asked the Argentine Court that former French president Valéry Giscard d'Estaing, former French premier Pierre Messmer, former French ambassador to Buenos Aires Françoise de la Gosse, and all officials in place in the French embassy in Buenos Aires between 1976 and 1983 be summoned before the court. Besides this "French connection," he has also charged former head of state Isabel Perón and former ministers Carlos Ruckauf and Antonio Cafiero, who had signed the "anti-subversion decrees" before Videla's 1976 coup d'état. According to ESMA survivor Graciela Dalo, this is another tactic which pretends that these crimes were legitimate as the 1987 Obediencia Debida Act claimed them to be and that they also obeyed to Isabel Perón's "anti-subversion decrees" (which, if true, would give them a formal appearance of legality, despite torture being forbidden by the Argentine Constitution)

== See also ==
- Dirty War
- Alfredo Astiz
