= Astiz =

Astiz is a surname. Notable people with the surname include:

- Alfredo Astiz (born 1951), Argentine military commander, intelligence officer, and naval commando
- Iñaki Astiz (born 1983), Spanish footballer
