= Zanchetta =

Zanchetta is a surname. Notable people with the surname include:

- Andrea Zanchetta (born 1975), Italian association football player
- Alberto Ángel Zanchetta, Argentine military chaplain
- Federico Zanchetta (born 2002), Italian association football player
- Gigi Zanchetta (born 1966), Venezuelan actress
- Gustavo Óscar Zanchetta (born 1964), Argentine Catholic bishop
- Jordan Zanchetta (born 1995), Australian rules footballer
