= Alice Domon =

French missionary religious sister (1937-1977)

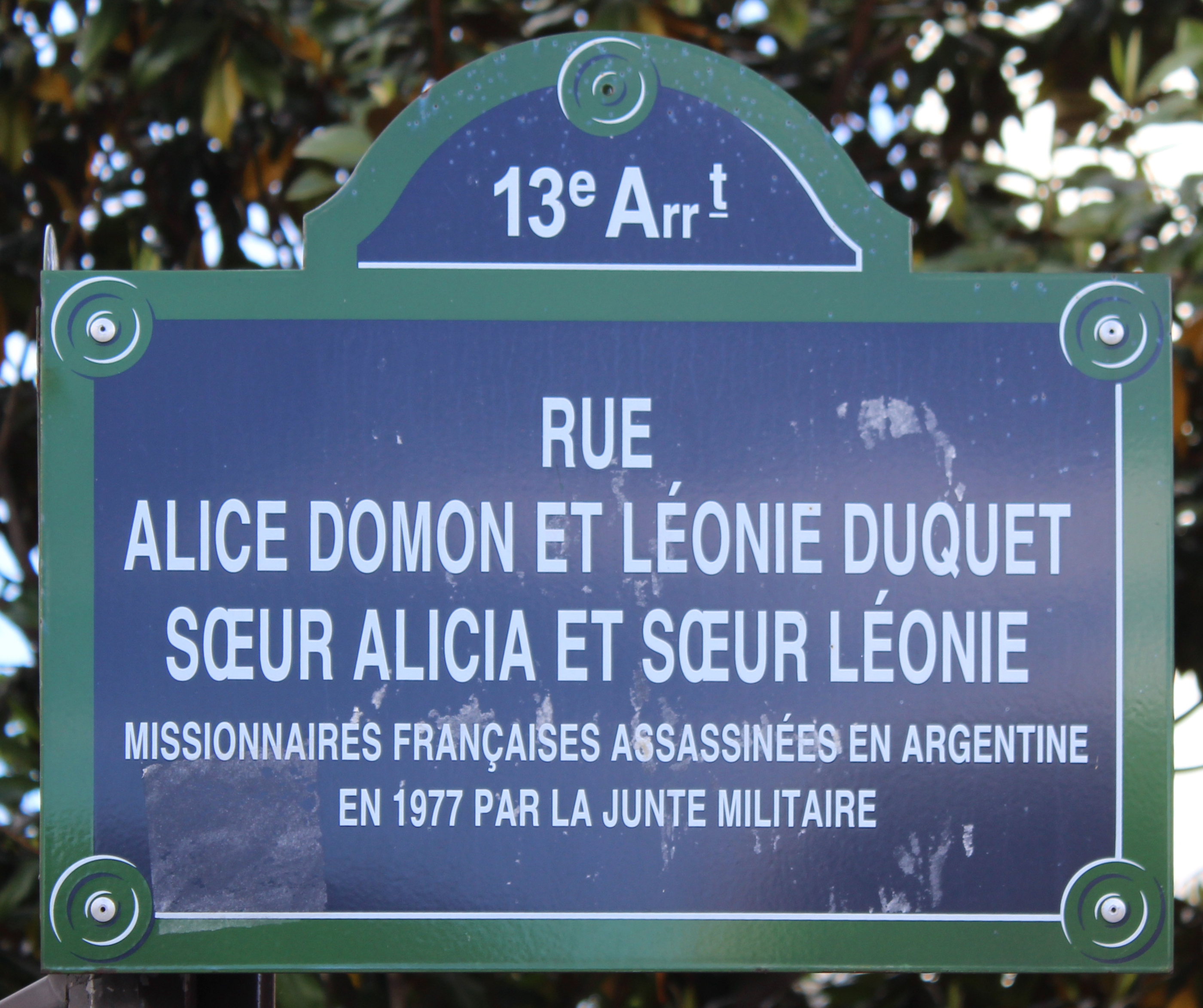
Street sign memorializing two murdered French missionary Religious Sisters, Alice-Domon-et-Léonie-Duquet Street in Paris, France.

Alice Domon, S.M.E., also known as Sister Alicia, (23 September 1937 – 17 or 18 December 1977) was one of two French missionary Religious Sisters in Argentina, members of the Sisters of the Foreign Missions based in Seysses, France, to be "disappeared" in December 1977 by the military dictatorship of the National Reorganization Process. She was among a dozen people associated with the Mothers of the Plaza de Mayo, a human rights group, who were kidnapped and taken to the secret detention center at ESMA.

According to witnesses who saw Domon there, over a period of about 10 days she was interrogated and tortured, forced to write a letter claiming participation in guerrilla group opposing the government, and photographed in a staged setting in front of a Montoneros banner. That group of detainees, including Sister Léonie Duquet, was "transferred", a euphemism for being taken out and killed. Bodies washed up on beaches south of Buenos Aires in December 1977 and were quickly buried in mass graves, but a March 1978 Agence France-Presse article reported that the bodies of the missing two French Sisters and others associated with the Mothers were believed to have been among them. DNA testing later confirmed one of the bodies to be that of Duquet. Domon's remains, however, have never been found.

In 2000, a small plaza in Buenos Aires was named "Hermana Alice Domon y Hermana Leonie Duquet," in honor of the Sisters. Their lives are celebrated in an annual commemoration at the parish church of San Cristobal, where they had worked and where the remains of Duquet and several Mothers of the Plaza de Mayo are buried.

In 2011, Alfredo Astiz, who had infiltrated the Mothers of the Plaza and organized the abduction of the twelve in December 1977, was convicted in absentía and sentenced to life imprisonment for that and other crimes against humanity. For his torturing at ESMA, he had been nicknamed "The Blond Angel of Death."

== Life ==
Alice Domon was born in Charquemont in France's Doubs region. As a girl she entered the Paris Foreign Missions Society. It invited her to Argentina in 1967, where she lived in Hurlingham and Morón, of the industrial corridor of Buenos Aires. She taught catechism to handicapped persons and worked with the poor.

Domon was a member of a group directed by Father Ismael Calcagno, first cousin of Jorge Rafael Videla, the dictator in power from 1976 to 1981, at the time of both the kidnapping and the murder. Alice Domon and her fellow nun Léonie Duquet were introduced to Videla because he needed assistance for his son Alejandro, a disabled child whom they taught and looked after in the Casa de la Caridad in Morón. In Buenos Aires the two sisters devoted their time to social work amongst the inhabitants of the city’s poorest townships. Alice Domon was assigned there along with Léonie Duquet, a French religious sister with whom she established a deep friendship.

Domon was dedicated to her social work with the inhabitants of shanty towns. In 1971 she went to Corrientes in order to collaborate with the Ligas Agrarias organization, which was formed by the small producers of cotton.

Following the military coup of 24 March 1976, the junta began extreme repression of political opponents and state terrorism. Domon decided to get involved with human rights organizations. Upon her return to Corrientes, she lodged at Léonie Duquet's house.

In December 1977, Sisters Alice and Léonie, along with the Mothers of the Plaza de Mayo and other human rights activists, prepared a request for the names of those who disappeared and for the government to divulge their whereabouts. The reply was publicized in the newspaper La Nación on 10 December 1977, the day Alice Domon disappeared. The name Gustavo Niño was found among the signatures as a false name, used in May by navy captain Alfredo Astiz, to infiltrate the Mothers of the Plaza de Mayo.

== "Disappearance": kidnapping, torture, and murder ==
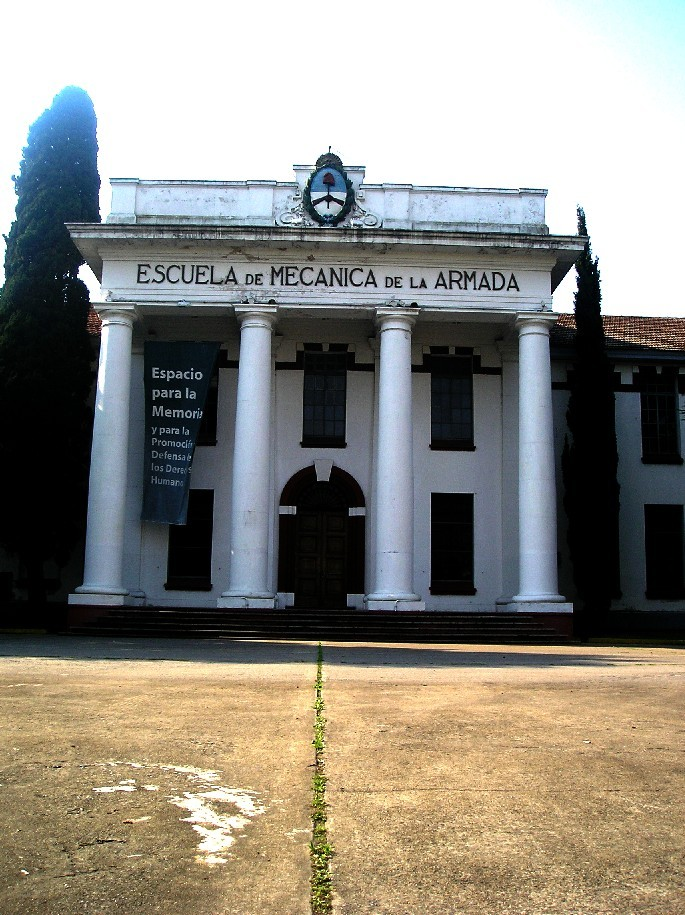
The ESMA building.

Between Thursday 8 and Saturday 10 December 1977, a group under the command of Alfredo Astiz, a Marine captain and intelligence officer, kidnapped a group of 12 people connected with the Mothers of the Plaza de Mayo. Among them were the French nuns Alice Domon and Léonie Duquet, along with Azucena Villaflor and two other founders of the Mothers of the Plaza de Mayo. Astiz had infiltrated the group, posing as a family member of a desaparecido and using a false name.

Alice Domon and most of the women were abducted from the Church of Santa Cruz, where the Mothers of the Plaza de Mayo used to meet. It is located in the San Cristóbal district within the city of Buenos Aires.

Sister Alice was taken directly to the secret detention center in the Navy Petty-Officers School of Mechanics (ESMA), under the control of the Argentine Navy. She was said to have been put in detention wearing a hood that cut off all sight. She was held for approximately 10 days, during which she was constantly tortured and interrogated. Horacio Domingo Maggio and Lisandro Raúl Cubas, survivors of detention at the ESMA, related what they knew on the subject in testimony to the national commission in 1985:

The same thing happened to the French nuns Alice Domon and Leonie Renée Duquet. I had the chance to speak with Sister Alice personally, she had already been taken along with Sister Renée to the third floor of the Officers' Mess in the ESMA, that was where I found her captive. This happened around December 11 or 12. I remember that was when she had been kidnapped at the church. I was soon aware of 13 people; the Sisters were weak and badly beaten; Alice already needed two guards to carry and maintain her in the bathroom. I asked if they had been tortured and they answered yes: they had been tied to a bed completely naked and stabbed all over their body; in addition they told of later being forced to write a letter to the Leader of their Congregation, they wrote it in French under constant torture, afterward they both had a photo taken of them seated next to a table. The pictures were taken to the basement of the same building where the torture took place: the basement of the Officers' Mess. They were both at ESMA about 10 days, tortured and interrogated. Later the eleven remaining people were transferred. The rumours mention the haste of their departure; this indicates the murders of the same (Testimony of Horacio Domingo Maggio, File #4450).

Around 10 or 12 of them were taken down, including the French Sister Alice Domon. Later Sister Rennée Duquet, from the same religious congregation as Alice, was also taken to ESMA. They put Sister René in "Capuchita". Sisters Alice and Renée were savagely tortured, especially Alice. Their conduct was admirable. Up until their worst moments of pain, Sister Alice, who was in "Capucha", asked for the luck of her compadres and, at the pinnacle of irony, she emphasized the "little blond boy", who was none other than Frigate Lieutenant Astiz (who had infiltrated the group, passing himself off as a relative of a desaparecido. At gunpoint they made Sister Alice write a letter in her own handwriting. ...As the crowning glory of this parody, they took pictures (of both Sisters) in the photo lab of the ESMA, in which they appeared seated at a table with a flag of the Montoneros Party behind them. Sisters Alice and Renée were "transferred" and, along with them, the others that were captured in their group. (Testimony of Lisandro Raúl Cubas, File #6794).

As the two Catholic sisters, Léonie Duquet and Alice Domon, were French nationals, their "disappearances" generated an international scandal, especially with France, which repeatedly tried to trace what had happened to them. The Argentine government was unresponsive to their inquiries.

The Army Chief and Junta Member Emilio Massera tried to make it appear as if both nuns had been kidnapped by the Montoneros leftist guerrilla organization. To this end, officers forced Domon under torture to write a letter to her superior in her order, in French, saying that she had been abducted by a group opposed to the administration of General Jorge Videla. The torturers took a picture of the two nuns seated in front of a Montoneros flag and sent it to a national newspaper. In the photograph, taken in the basement of the ESMA, the two women showed obvious physical signs of torture; copies were sent to the French press.

On 15 December 1977 La Nación published a notice from the EFE news agency entitled "Vivas y con buena salud" (Alive and in good health). The article reported that the Mother Superior of the Congregation in France said that the Sisters Léonie and Alice had been detained but remained alive and in good health. She said the information came from the Papal Nuncio in Argentina.

On either 17 or 18 December 1977, the two sisters and the rest of their group were trasladadas ("transferred": a euphemism used by the military when murdering dissidents) to the military airport in Buenos Aires. They were put in a Marine plane and thrown out of the plane while still alive, landing in the sea off the coast of Santa Teresita, where they died as soon as they hit the water.

As an example of the dehumanizing cruelty of the marines linked with the repression during the Dirty War, they occasionally made reference to the nuns as the "flying nuns," jokingly referring to the American TV series.

== Later prosecution of crimes ==
After democracy was restored, the government held a national commission to collect testimony from survivors about desaparacedos and treatment at the hands of military and security forces. In 1985, the government tried the top former officers of the military in the Trial of the Juntas. Investigations had been made of hundreds of other officers. Under threat of a military coup, the Congress passed legislation known as the "Pardon Laws" in 1986 and 1987, ending prosecution and establishing a kind of amnesty for acts on both sides during the Dirty War.

During this period, in 1990, Captain Alfredo Astiz was convicted in France of kidnapping Duquet and Domon, and sentenced in absentia to life in prison by the Appellate Court in Paris. At that time, the bodies of the two women had not been found, so he could not be charged with murder.

In 2003 during the administration of President Nestor Kirchner, Congress repealed the Pardon Laws. The Argentine Supreme Court ruled they were unconstitutional, and the government re-opened cases of war crimes during the Dirty War. In 2006 Miguel Etcholatz was the first former officer convicted and sentenced to life in a new series of trials. Prosecutions continued.

Astiz also went to trial. On 27 October 2011, Alfredo Astiz was convicted by an Argentinian court and sentenced to life imprisonment for crimes against humanity committed during the Dirty War.

In 2012 an Argentinian prosecutor filed charges against the Dutch-Argentinian pilot Julio Poch for flying the navy plane which supposedly dumped Domon, Duquet and three other women into the Atlantic Ocean.

== Evidence in later prosecutions ==
After the restoration of democracy in 1984, the investigations of the National Commission on the Disappearance of Persons and the 1985 Trial of the Juntas led to the exhuming of graves in the cemetery of General Lavalle, searching for evidence related to war crimes. Skeletal remains were found belonging to some cadavers found in 1977 and later on the beaches of San Bernardo and Lucila del Mar. The remains were used in the trial against the Juntas and then stored in sixteen bags.

From that point on, Judge Horacio Cattani began to accumulate cases about desaparecidos. Passage in 1986 and 1987 of the Ley de Punto Final and the Ley de Obediencia Debida, respectively, caused an end to the investigation. By 1995, Cattani had collected an archive of 40 square meters containing potential answers to questions about the missing bodies.

In July 2005, the Chief of Police of General Lavalle informed Cattani that they had identified more unmarked graves in the town cemetery. Judge Cattani ordered that new excavations be carried out by the Argentine Forensic Anthropology Team, who discovered two rows of graves side-by-side. They found eight skeletons: five female, two male, and one uncertain (classified as "probably male").

As a result of forensic DNA studies in August 2005, the five female remains were found to belong to five of the women captured between 8 and 10 December 1977: Azucena Villaflor, María Ponce de Bianco, Esther Ballestrino de Careaga, Angela Auad, and Sister Léonie Duquet. All of them have since been buried in the garden of the Santa Cruz church in Buenos Aires. No evidence has been found for the remains of Alice Domon.

== United States government internal reports ==
Secret government documents from the United States Government declassified in 2002 show that the US Ambassador to Argentina advised the State Department in March 1978 that bodies washed up on beaches of Buenos Aires Province likely included those of missing French nationals, the nuns Alice Domon and Léonie Duquet; as well as three founders of the Madres de Plaza de Mayo: Azucena Villaflor, Esther Ballestrino and María Ponce, and two other mothers. As noted in the memo, this was based on reports by Agence France-Presse, published in French and international papers on 28 March 1978 and a reliable source within the government. Apparently, this information was kept secret.

This is documented in formerly classified Document #1978-BUENOS-02346 written by the former U.S. Ambassador to Argentina, Raúl Castro, to the Secretary of State of the United States, dated 30 March 1978, with the subject line "Report of nuns death". The document reads:

1. A.F.P. (Agence France-Presse) March 28 story filed from Paris reports that the bodies of the two French nuns (Alicia Doman and Renee Duguet) (sic) who were abducted in mid December with eleven other human rights activists were identified among corpses near Bahía Blanca.

2. Buenos Aires was filled with such rumors over a month ago based on accounts of the discovery of a number of cadavers beached by unusually strong winds along Atlantic Sea, points closer to the mouth of La Plata River some 300-350 miles to the north of Bahía Blanca.

3. (Name redacted), which has been trying to track down these rumors, has confidential information that the nuns were abducted by Argentine security agents and at some point were transferred to a prison located in the town of Juníi, which is 150 miles west of Buenos Aires.

4. Embassy also has confidential information through an Argentine government source (protected) that seven bodies were discovered some weeks ago on the beach near Mar del Plata. According to this source, the bodies were those of the two nuns and five mothers who disappeared between December 8 and December 10, 1977. Our source confirmed that these individuals were originally sequestered by members of the security forces acting under a broad mandate against terrorists and subversives. Source further states that few individuals in GOA were aware of this information.

5. The source has reported reliably in the past and we have reason to believe he is reliable concerning disappearance questions.

== Memorials ==
- On 8 December every year, in the Santa Cruz church of San Cristobal, the anniversary of the "disappearance" of the group of members of the Mothers of the Plaza de Mayo and the two French nuns is commemorated and their lives are celebrated.
- In 2000, Buenos Aires named a small plaza "Hermana Alice Domon y Hermana Leonie Duquet," located at the intersection of Moreto, Medina, and Cajaravilla streets.
- 2000, director Alberto Marquardt premiered a film titled Yo, Sor Alice about Alice Domon's life; it was an Argentine-French co-production.

== Bibliography ==
El Infiltrado: La Verdadera Historia de Alfredo Astiz, Editorial Sudamericana, Buenos Aires, 1996, by Uki Goñi (in Spanish)
