= Svante Grände =

Swedish aid worker (1947–1975)

- Born: 26 March 1947; Tvååker, Sweden
- Died: 14 October 1975 (aged 28); Tucumán Province, Argentina
- Occupation: aid worker
- Known for: being one of the two Swedish citizens to be killed in the Dirty War
- Parents: Gustaf Grände (father); Anna-Carin Crona (mother)

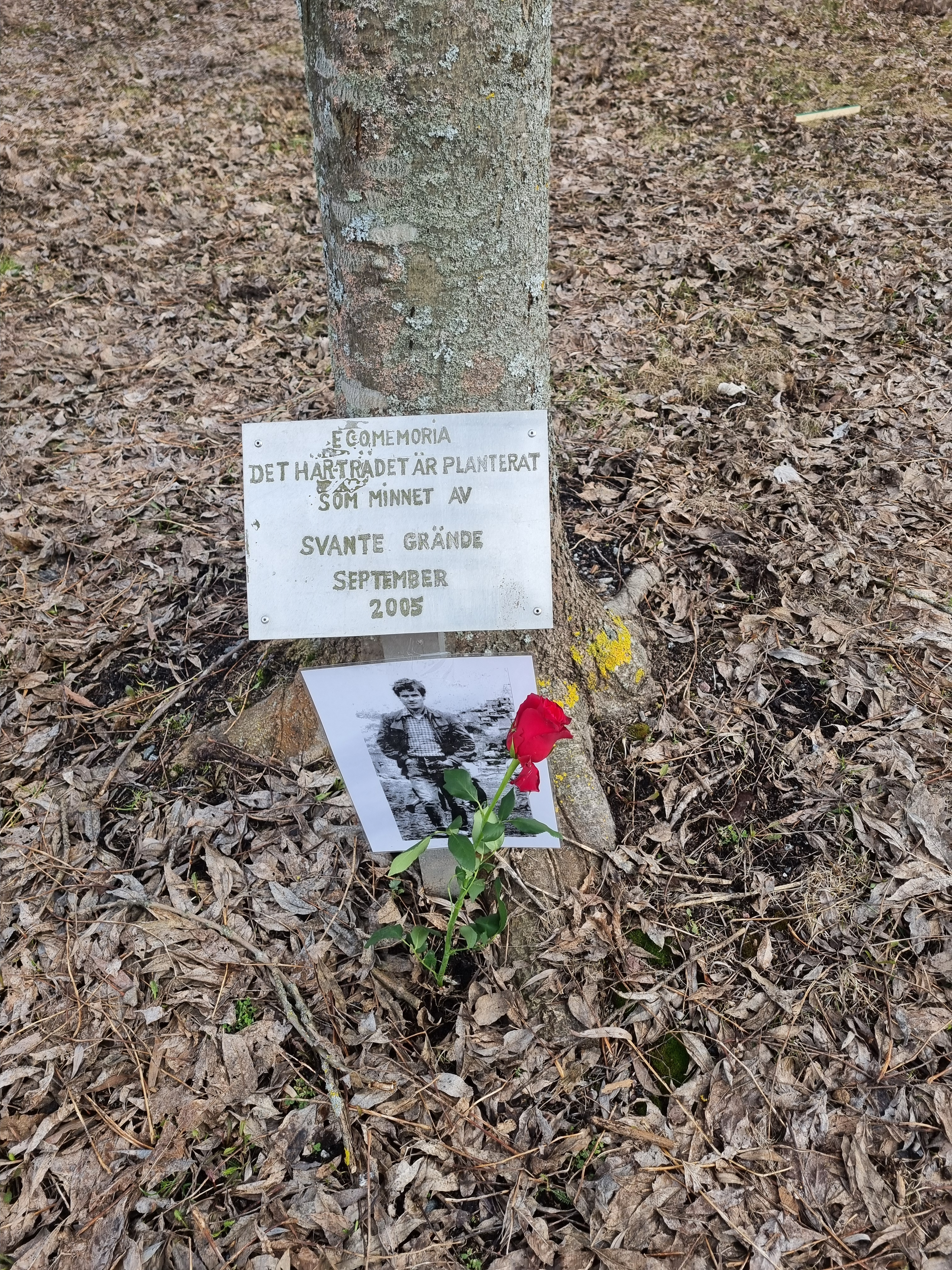
Memory tree over Svante Grande

Svante Grände (26 March 1947 – 14 October 1975) was a Swedish aid worker and guerrilla fighter in Latin America during the 1970s. He was one of two known Swedish citizens to be killed in the Dirty War in Argentina, the other being 17-year-old enforced disappearance victim Dagmar Hagelin.

== Biography ==
Grände was born in Tvååker, Sweden and was the fifth out of seven children of vicar Gustaf Grände and Anna-Carin Crona. He became an aid worker (part of UBV) in Chile in 1971 and after the 1973 coup d'état he joined the Revolutionary Left Movement (MIR), an armed resistance movement that fought dictator Augusto Pinochet. Grände was given the call name Comandante Julio. After months on the run in the mountains of southern Chile, he and other surviving guerrilla members were able to escape to Argentina. There Grände joined the People's Revolutionary Army (ERP) and became a lieutenant at the beginning of 1975.

Grände was killed by Argentine troops in an ambush on 14 October 1975 in Tucumán Province, Argentina. He was at the time part of the mountain guerrilla company called "Ramón Rosa Jiménez".

== See also ==
- Dagmar Hagelin
- List of solved missing person cases: 1950–1999
- List of unsolved murders (1900–1979)
