= Léonie Duquet =

French activist religious sister (1916–977)

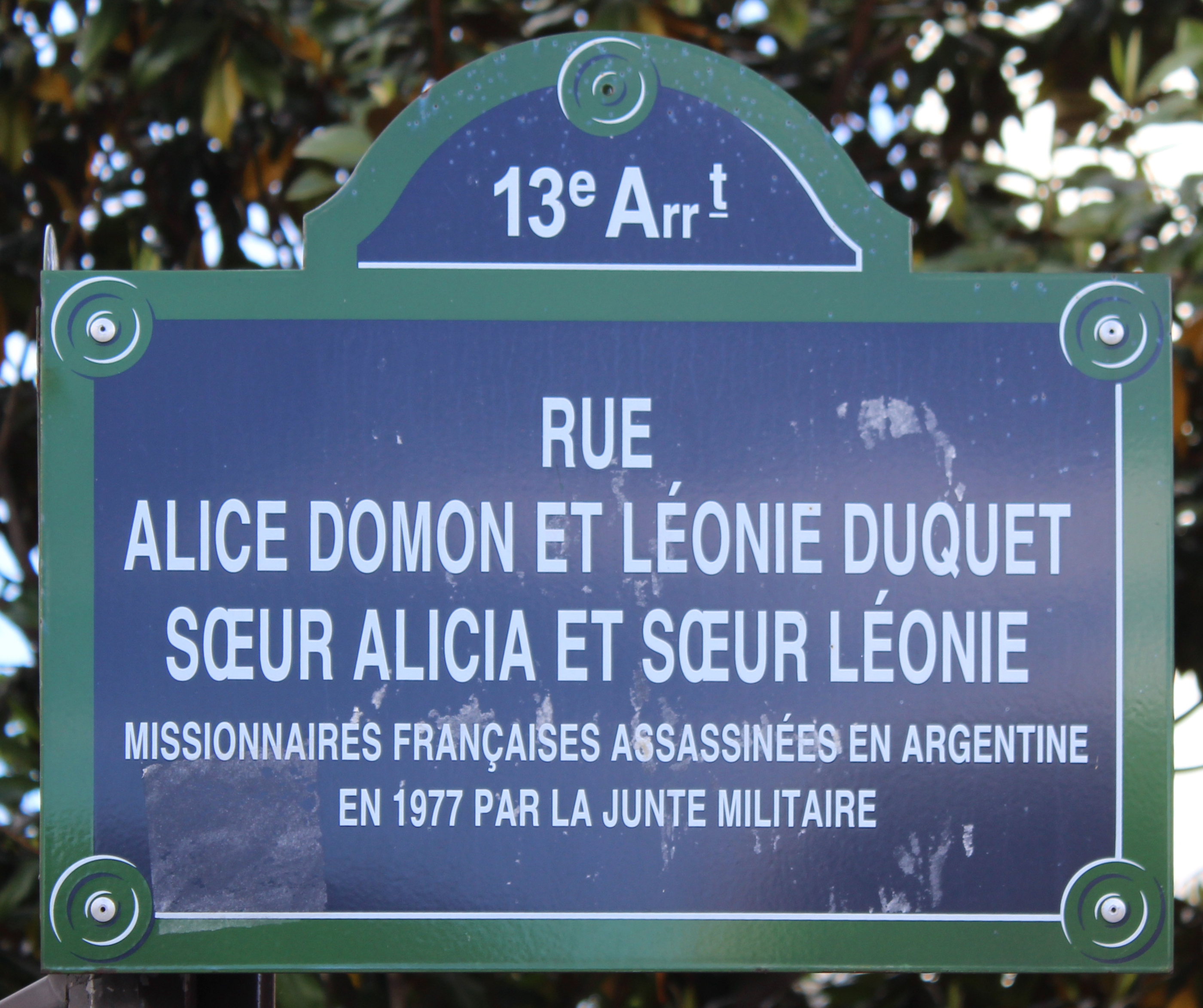
Memorial of two murdered French Religious Sisters in France, Place Alice Domon-et-Léonie-Duquet Street, Paris.

Marie Léonie Duquet, S.M.E. (9 April 1916 – December 1977) was one of two French Religious Sisters, members of the Sisters of the Foreign Missions based in Seysses, France, who were arrested in December 1977 in Buenos Aires, Argentina, and "disappeared". Alice Domon, the other French Sister working with Duquet, disappeared a few days later. They are believed to have been murdered by the military regime of Argentine President Jorge Rafael Videla during the Dirty War.

Duquet and Domon had been working in poor neighborhoods of Buenos Aires in the 1970s and supported the Mothers of the Plaza de Mayo, founded in 1977. Despite repeated efforts by France to trace the two Sisters, the Argentine military dictatorship was unresponsive. In 1990 a French court in Paris tried Argentine Captain Alfredo Astiz, known to have arrested Duquet and believed implicated in the "disappearance" of Domon, for kidnapping the two Sisters. He was convicted and sentenced to life imprisonment in absentia. In Argentina at the time, he and other military and security officers were shielded from prosecution by Pardon Laws passed in 1986 and 1987. These were repealed in 2003 and ruled unconstitutional in 2005, and the government re-opened prosecution of war crimes.

In July 2005 several bodies were found in a mass grave in General Lavalle Cemetery, 400 kilometers south of Buenos Aires. Forensic DNA testing in August identified one as Duquet's. DNA testing revealed that within the same grave were the remains of the three "disappeared" Argentine women, founders of the Mothers of the Plaza de Mayo, who had also been missing since December 1977. To date, the remains of Domon have not been found. Since the confirmation of Duquet's murder, France has been seeking extradition of Astiz; in 2005 he was being detained in Argentina after being indicted on charges of kidnapping and torture.

== Biography ==
Born Léonie Henriette Duquet in 1916 in Longemaison, Doubs, she grew up in a devout Catholic family. Feeling called to service in the Church, she joined the Sisters of the Foreign Missions at their motherhouse at the Chateau de Notre-Dame de la Motte in Seysses. After taking her religious vows, she traveled and worked as a missionary internationally.

In August 1949, Duquet was one of a group of four Sisters sent to Argentina by the congregation to establish their work in that country. They started their service in the city of Hurlingham. She later began to be involved in social work in the capital and its surrounding suburbs.

Another member of the congregation, Alice Domon, was assigned to Argentina during the early 1970s. At that time she was assigned to the group directed by Father Ismaele Calcagno, a first cousin of Jorge Rafael Videla, the future dictator of Argentina. Duquet and Domon were introduced to Videla because he needed assistance for his son Alejandro, a disabled child whom they taught and looked after in the Casa de la Caridad in Morón.

In Buenos Aires the two Sisters devoted their time to social work amongst the inhabitants of the city’s poorest townships. Duquet was dedicated to helping Argentina's poor and worked among them in Buenos Aires province as well as in the capital city. She lived and worked at the Church of San Pablo in Ramos Mejia, on the south side of the city.

Duquet and Domon became involved with the Mothers of the Plaza de Mayo movement, which started in April 1977. The mothers wanted to publicize their "disappeared" children and force the government to tell them of their fates and locate them. The military dictatorship had a policy of suppressing political opposition by widespread state terrorism. Thousands of Argentine citizens who opposed the government had "disappeared", others were known to have been killed.

In December 1977, Duquet was arrested and kidnapped in the Parish Church of San Pablo in Ramos Majia by Marine Captain Alfredo Astiz. This was shortly after Astiz had led a police action at the Holy Cross Church in Buenos Aires against the Mothers of the Plaza de Mayo, where he had arranged the arrest of Azucena Villaflor and two others of the 13 founders of the group, together with a total of ten associates. Alice Domon was kidnapped soon after. Astiz became known as the "Blond Angel of Death". one of the most infamous torturers in Argentina.

The prisoners were taken to ESMA, where a secret detention and torture center had been set up. According to testimony of survivors, the Sisters and other prisoners were held there about 10 days and severely tortured under interrogation. The Sisters were forced to write and sign letters to the superior general of their congregation, saying they had acted in opposition to the government of Videla. They were photographed in front of a Montoneros banner, to appear as if they were with that guerrilla group. The photo was released to local and French press; the women showed evidence of physical torture. Soon after, all the group was "transferred out" of ESMA, which was understood to mean they were killed (Testimony of Horacio Domingo Maggio, File #4450); Testimony of Lisandro Raúl Cubas, File #6794).

Duquet is believed to have been killed by a military death squad under Astiz' command. As neither her nor Villaflor's bodies were found, some observers thought the women may have been among victims flown by plane and helicopter and thrown out while still alive over the ocean near Buenos Aires. In early 1978, unidentified bodies began to wash up on the beaches south of Buenos Aires.

The "disappearances" of Duquet and Domon, two French nationals, attracted international attention and outrage, with demands for a United Nations investigation of human rights abuses in the country. France demanded information of both the French nuns, but the Argentine government denied all responsibility for them.

Despite losing some of their founders, the Mothers of the Plaza continued marching and within the year hundreds of women and family friends joined them, demanding an accounting from the government. The weekly marches and annual anniversaries of resistance stood against the government's silence about the "disappeared".

== Later trial and discovery ==
In 1990, Alfredo Astiz was tried and convicted in absentia of the kidnapping of the two sisters, Duquet and Domon, by a French court in Paris and sentenced to life imprisonment. He was not charged with murder because no bodies had been found for Duquet or Domon.

In July 2005, seven bodies were found in a mass grave near General Lavalle Cemetery, about 400 km south of Buenos Aires. Believing the remains were of people "disappeared" from 1976 to 1983, the democratic Argentine government ordered forensic DNA testing of the bodies. On 28 August 2005, one of the seven bodies was identified as that of Léonie Duquet. Villaflor and two other Mothers of the Plaza were also identified among them. Domon has not been found but is presumed dead.

By 2005, Astiz was being detained in Argentina at a naval facility on charges of kidnapping and torture. After passage in Argentina of the Pardon Laws in 1986 and 1987, he had been protected for a time from prosecution. He was dismissed from the military in 1998 for "making statements to the press defending his actions under the military dictatorship." In 2003 the Argentine Congress repealed the Pardon Laws, and in 2005 the Supreme Court ruled they were unconstitutional. The government had re-opened prosecution of war crimes committed during the dictatorship.

After identification of Duquet's remains, the French government was seeking extradition of Astiz to serve his sentence in France and to be tried for the murder of Duquet.

In October 2011, Astiz was convicted of crimes against humanity and sentenced to life in prison by an Argentine court.

== Argentine trial ==
During the ESMA trial, Luis María Mendía testified in January 2007 before the Argentine tribunal that a French intelligence agent, Bertrand de Perseval, had participated in the abduction of Duquet and Domon. Perseval, who lives today in Thailand, has denied any links with the abduction of the nuns. He has admitted to being a former member of the Organisation armée secrète (OAS) operated by the French in Algeria during the civil war and said he went to Argentina after the March 1962 Évian Accords ended the Algerian War (1954–62).

French intelligence agents have long been suspected of having trained Argentine counterparts in "counter-insurgency" techniques (including the use of torture in investigations). Marie Monique Robin's TV documentary, The Death Squads – the French School (Les escadrons de la mort – l'école française, 2003), based on her book, documented that the French intelligence services had trained Argentine counterparts in counter-insurgency techniques.

During his testimony, Luis María Mendia referred to the film as evidence, and asked that the Argentine Court require former French president Giscard d'Estaing, former French premier Messmer, former French ambassador to Buenos Aires François de la Gorce, and all officials in place in the French embassy in Buenos Aires between 1976 and 1983 to be summoned before the court for their part in the abuses. Besides this French connection, he said the former head of state Isabel Perón and former ministers Carlos Ruckauf and Antonio Cafiero, who signed the "anti-subversion decrees" before Videla's 1976 coup d'état, had set up the policy and mechanism for state terrorism.

ESMA survivor Graciela Daleo characterized Mendía's allegations as a tactic to justify his crimes as legitimate. Under the 1987 Obediencia Debida Act, passed under pressure by the military, lower-level military and security personnel could not be prosecuted for carrying out orders. Similarly, Mendía said he and others had obeyed Isabel Perón's "anti-subversion decrees" (giving them a formal appearance of legality, although torture was forbidden by the Argentine Constitution).

The 1986 and 1987 Pardon Laws had been repealed in 2003, and ruled unconstitutional by the Argentine Supreme Court in 2005. By the time of Mendía's trial, this legislation provided no protection to him and others indicted for crimes committed under the military dictatorship.

In 2012, an Argentinian prosecutor filed charges against Julio Alberto Poch (es), a Dutch-Argentinian pilot, for flying the helicopter that carried the bodies of Domon, Duquet and three other women to be dumped into the Atlantic Ocean. On November 29, 2017, an Argentinian court unanimously acquitted Mr. Poch.

== Family ==
Duquet's niece is Sister Geneviève Jeanningros, one of the Little Sisters of Jesus, who since the 1960s has had a ministry to circus performers, living, working and travelling with them in a caravan, latterly in and around Rome. In 2005, Sister Geneviève negotiated the re-burial of her aunt's body with the then Archbishop of Buenos Aires, Jorge Mario Bergoglio, later Pope Francis, and they became friends; the Pope mentioned her in his autobiography. After his death, Sister Geneviève came to public attention when, during the Pope's lying-in-state, the Vatican permitted her, against protocol, to stand for several minutes within the cordon around the open coffin to mourn and pray for him.
