= Azucena Villaflor =

Argentine activist (1924–1977)

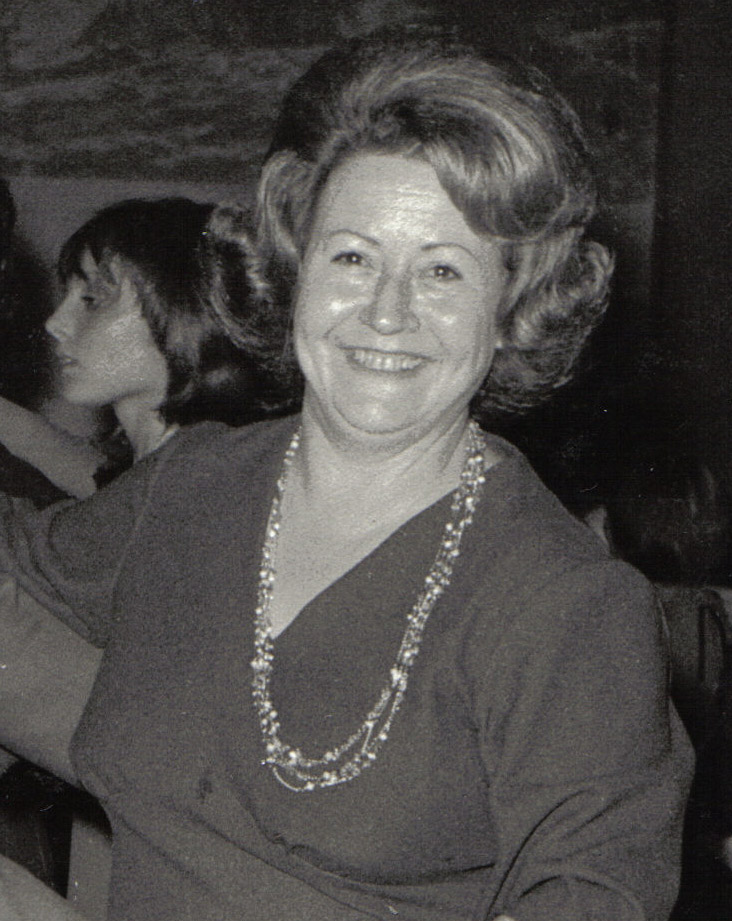
- Villaflor in the 1970s
- Born: 7 April 1924; Buenos Aires Province, Argentina
- Disappeared: 10 December 1977 (aged 53); Buenos Aires Province, Argentina
- Body discovered: 20 December 1977
- Occupation: Activist
- Spouse: Pedro De Vincenti
- Children: 4

Azucena Villaflor (7 April 1924 – 10 December 1977) was an Argentine activist and one of the founders of the Mothers of the Plaza de Mayo, a human rights organisation which looks for the victims of enforced disappearances during Argentina's Dirty War.

== Personal life ==
Villaflor was born into a lower-class family to Florentino Villaflor, a 21-year-old wool factory worker, and his 15-year-old wife, Emma Nitz. Villaflor's paternal family had a history of involvement in militant Peronism.

At the age of 16, Villaflor started working as a secretary for a home appliances company, where she met Pedro de Vincenti, a labour union delegate. She and de Vincenti married in 1949, and had four children together. They lived in Villa Dominico in Buenos Aires Province.

== Mothers of the Plaza de Mayo ==
On 30 November 1976, eight months after the establishment of the National Reorganisation Process, Villaflor's son Néstor and his girlfriend Raquel Mangin were abducted. Villaflor attempted to search for them through the Ministry of Interior and also sought support from military vicar Adolfo Tortolo; during the search, Villaflor began to meet other women who were looking for missing relatives.

After six months, Villaflor decided to start a series of demonstrations in order to publicise Néstor and Raquel's disappearances. On 30 April 1977, she and thirteen other mothers, including María Adela Gard de Antokoletz, went to Plaza de Mayo in central Buenos Aires, in front of the Casa Rosada, due to Villaflor considering this to be a politically and historically important site in Argentina. The original protest, which turned into a march after the military ordered that they not "group" but "circulate" around the plaza, happened on a Saturday; the second on a Friday; and subsequently each Thursday at 3:30pm.

== Disappearance and death ==
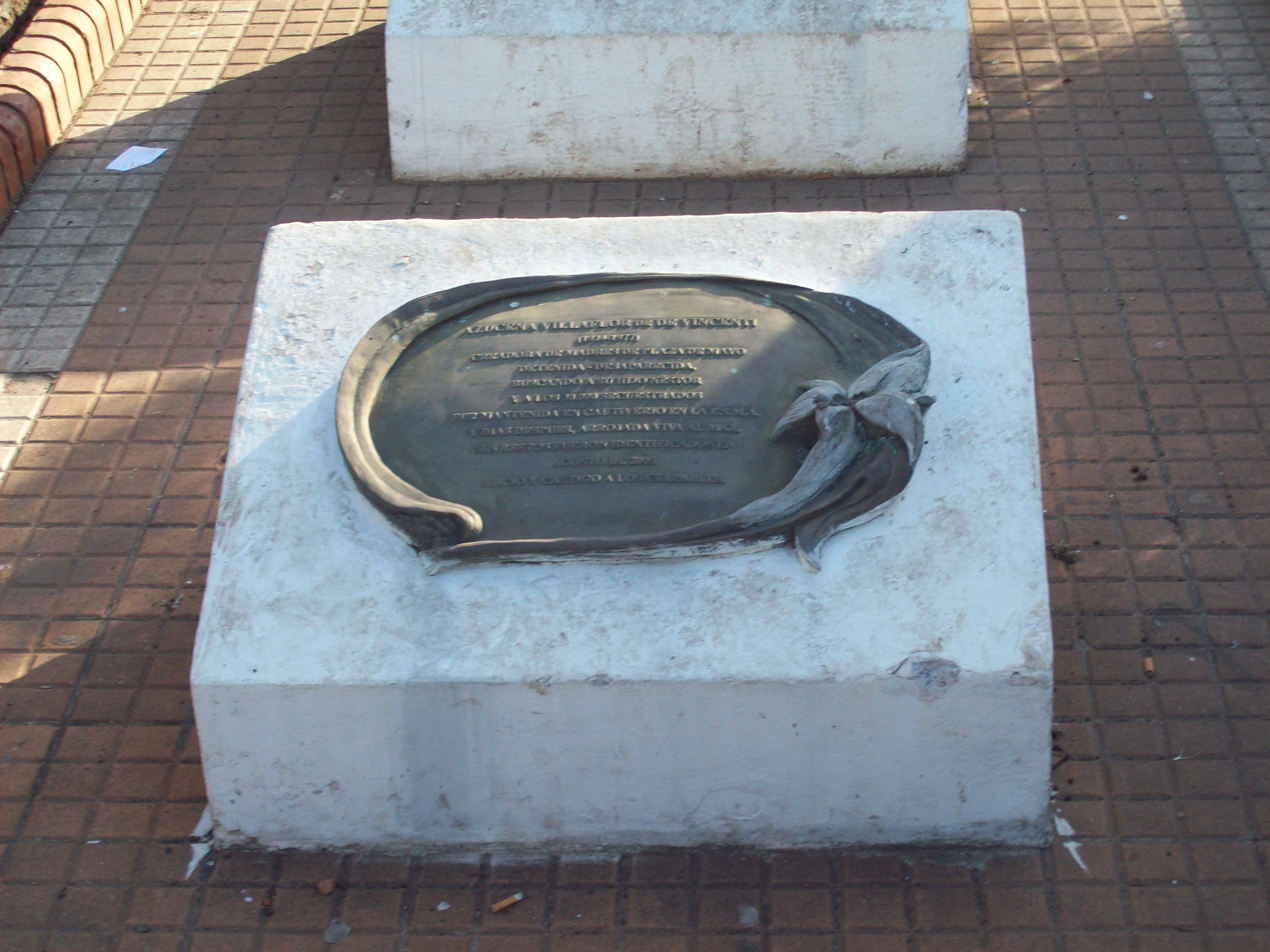
Gravestone of Villaflor

=== Kidnapping and murder ===
On 10 December 1977, the Mothers of the Plaza de Mayo published an advertisement including the names of their disappeared children. That same night, Villaflor was taken by armed individuals from her home in Villa Dominico, and was reported to have been detained at a concentration camp belonging to the Navy Petty-Officers School, which was run by Alfredo Astiz at that time. It is believed that Villaflor was tortured that night alongside other kidnapped women, including a group of French nuns, and that they were murdered a few days later.

On 20 December 1977, several bodies washed up on the shores of Santa Teresita and Mar del Tuyú in Buenos Aires Province. The cause of death was reported to be "impact on hard objects from a great height", consistent with the so-called death flight, as recounted by former Argentine naval officer and convicted criminal Adolfo Scilingo. The bodies were not identified and were buried in a cemetery in General Lavalle.

=== Exhumation and identification ===
In 2003, exhumations started by the Argentine Forensic Anthropology Team, which ultimately would identify the bodies of five women as belonging to Villaflor, Esther Ballestrino, María Ponce de Bianco, Ángela Auad, and Léonie Duquet, all of whom had disappeared in 1977; Villaflor's body was formally identified in a report published on 8 July 2005. The bodies showed fractures consistent with a fall and impact against a solid surface, which led to the hypothesis that the women had been killed during a death flight, as recounted by former Argentine naval officer and convicted criminal Adolfo Scilingo.

Villaflor's remains were cremated and buried at the foot of the Pirámide de Mayo in the centre of the Plaza de Mayo on 8 December 2005, following the 25th Annual Resistance March of the Mothers; the location was chosen by her surviving children.

== Legacy ==
A biography of Villaflor was written by Enrique Arrosagaray, originally published in 1997. A street was named after her in Buenos Aires in 1996.
