= Dagmar Hagelin =

Swedish-Argentine girl who disappeared during the Dirty War

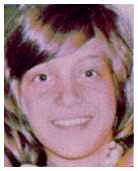
- Hagelin in February 1975
- Born: 29 September 1959; Buenos Aires, Argentina
- Disappeared: 27 January 1977 (aged 17); El Palomar, Argentina
- Cause of death: Murdered
- Known for: Murder victim
- Parent: Ragnar Hagelin (father)

Dagmar Hagelin (29 September 1959 – disappeared on 27 January 1977) was a 17-year-old Swedish-Argentine girl who disappeared during the Dirty War on 27 January 1977, and is presumed to have been arrested by security forces in El Palomar, Buenos Aires, Argentina, and murdered as a result of a mistaken identification. Dagmar's father, Argentine-Swedish businessman Ragnar Hagelin, worked for several decades to have the responsible people brought to justice, accusing Alfredo Astiz.

Hagelin and Svante Grände are the two known Swedish victims of the Dirty War during Argentina's military regime.

In October 2011, Alfredo Astiz was sentenced to life imprisonment for crimes against humanity in Argentina between 1976 and 1983. Dagmar's father, Ragnar Hagelin commented to Swedish media on the sentence that he, "couldn't describe the happiness he felt that after 34 years of struggles, Dagmar’s killer would finally pay for his crimes". In 2010, a pilot named Julio Poch was indicted for Dagmar's murder. Ragnar Hagelin resided in Stockholm, Sweden, until his death in October 2016.

== Mistaken identity ==
It is believed that Hagelin was a victim of mistaken identity when on 27 January 1977, she went to visit a friend in the suburbs of Buenos Aires. Her friend, who was politically active, had been arrested the night before by Astiz's forces and had said during interrogations that another politically active friend of her would visit the next day. Hagelin, who had decided to visit her friend on a spur of the moment, was approached by the forces and shot when she tried to escape. She was taken to ESMA, a torture centre, where she was later killed. Hagelin was 17 years old at the time of her death.

== See also ==
- List of kidnappings (1970–1979)
- Lists of solved missing person cases
- Svante Grände
