= Geneviève Jeanningros =

French Religious Sister, known for her ministry to traveling circus troupes

Geneviève Jeanningros, L.S.J., also known as Little Sister Geneviève, (born c. 1942/1943) is a French Religious Sister and member of the Little Sisters of Jesus, a religious institute dedicated to contemplative life while sharing the lives of the most marginalized groups of society.

== Life ==
In the 1960s, Jeanningros developed a ministry to the traveling circus troupes of Europe, often excluded from practicing their faith due to the nomadic nature of their lives, as well as facing ostracism by the populations they serve. To this end, she lived in a caravan, whereby she was able to join them in their travels.

Jeanningros is a niece of Léonie Duquet, a member of the French Institute of Sisters of the Foreign Missions. She was a missionary in Argentina who was murdered in 1977 by the military junta then ruling the country. Her remains were discovered in a mass grave only in 2005. In arranging for a proper funeral for her aunt, Jeanningros met Jorge Mario Bergoglio (who later became Pope Francis), who was then the Archbishop of Buenos Aires and approved Duquet's re-burial in a church cemetery. When Bergoglio became pope, he invited Jeanningros to attend Mass at the Vatican and visited her caravan residence.

During the COVID-19 pandemic, Pope Francis asked her to assist fairground workers who had lost their income due to restrictions. Jeanningros also met with a group of Latin American transgender sex workers during this time. Jeanningros regularly brought a group of LGBTQ people to the Pope's public audiences each week.

Jeanningros became known worldwide at the funeral of Pope Francis, where she stood alone by his coffin, in the section reserved for the clergy, openly weeping for him. Many media commentators remarked at her open grief and her simple attire on an occasion of such formal ceremony.

== See also ==
- Enforced disappearance
- National Reorganization Process
