= Alfredo Astiz =

Argentine military officer

- Born: 8 November 1951 (age 74)
- Military career
- Allegiance: Argentina
- Branch: Argentine Navy
- Service years: 1970–1995
- Rank: Frigate Captain (dishonorably discharged)
- Nickname: El Ángel Rubio de la Muerte (The Blond Angel of Death)
- Units: Grupo de Tareas 3.3.2, Tactical Divers Group
- Conflicts: Falklands War; Invasion of South Georgia; Operation Paraquet

Alfredo Ignacio Astiz (born 8 November 1951) is an Argentine former military commander, intelligence officer, and naval commando who served in the Argentine Navy during the military dictatorship of Jorge Rafael Videla during the Proceso de Reorganización Nacional (1976–1983). A convicted war criminal, he was known as El Ángel Rubio de la Muerte (the "Blond Angel of Death"), and had a reputation as a torturer. He was discharged from the military in 1998 after defending his actions in a press interview.

He was a member of GT 3.3.2 (Task Group 3.3.2) based in the Naval Mechanics School (ESMA) in Buenos Aires during the Dirty War of 1976–1983. The school was adapted as a secret detention and torture center for political prisoners. As many as 5,000 political prisoners were interrogated, tortured and murdered in the ESMA during those years. GT 3.3.2 was involved in some of the 8,961 deaths and other crimes documented by a national commission after the restoration of democratic government in Argentina in 1983.

Astiz, a specialist in the infiltration of human rights organizations, was implicated in the December 1977 kidnapping of twelve human rights activists, including Azucena Villaflor and two other founders of the Mothers of the Plaza de Mayo, and two French nationals, Léonie Duquet and Alice Domon, who were Catholic nuns. None of the twelve were seen alive again outside detention and all were believed killed, rumored to be among the bodies washed up on beaches south of Buenos Aires in late 1977.

At the beginning of the 1982 Falklands War, Astiz surrendered with his team to British forces. Sweden and France wanted to question him about "disappearances" of their nationals at his hands but, considering issues of the Geneva Conventions, the United Kingdom had him questioned by a British policeman. Astiz refused to answer any questions. The UK did not think it had grounds to hold or prosecute him, as he was suspected of crimes committed in Argentina that were not then defined as against international law, and repatriated him. In 1986 and 1987, Argentina passed the Pardon Laws, providing a kind of amnesty to military and security officers for crimes committed during the Dirty War. In 1990, a French court convicted Astiz in absentia for the kidnapping of Duquet and Domon, and sentenced him to life imprisonment.

After the Argentine Supreme Court's 2005 ruling that the Pardon Laws (Ley de Obediencia Debida and Ley de Punto Final) were unconstitutional, the government re-opened prosecution of war crimes cases. That year Astiz was detained on charges of kidnapping and torture. A mass grave with several unidentified bodies was found in July 2005 in a cemetery about 400 kilometers south of Buenos Aires; forensic DNA testing identified Duquet, Villaflor, and two other founding Mothers of the Plaza de Mayo. The prosecution of charges against Astiz included murder. Together with numerous other defendants associated with ESMA, Astiz was convicted and sentenced to life imprisonment in Argentina for crimes against humanity on 26 October 2011.

== Naval career ==
Under Lieutenant Commander Jorge Eduardo Acosta, the GT 3.3.2 (Task Force 3.3.2) was based in the Naval Mechanics School (ESMA) in Buenos Aires during the Dirty War. About 5,000 political prisoners were interrogated, tortured, and murdered in the ESMA, or elsewhere by its personnel, during those years. GT332 was involved in some of the 8,961 deaths and other crimes documented by the National Commission on the Disappearance of Persons (CONADEP) after the restoration of democratic government in Argentina in 1983.

=== Intelligence officer ===
During the Dirty War, Astiz specialized as an intelligence officer with GT 3.3.2 in infiltrating human rights groups in Argentina, particularly those active in Buenos Aires. He used the false name of "Gustavo Niño." He stayed with a group long enough to identify key members and then organized their abductions by his military forces. Prisoners were taken to the secret detention camp at ESMA and interrogated under torture for information about other members and activities. Most detainees were murdered by the military or death squads.

Astiz was believed to have kidnapped and tortured hundreds of people during 1976 and 1977. Among these were several nationals of other countries, whose cases received international attention as their governments tried to find them and to prosecute suspects. In 1976 and 1977, Astiz' team kidnapped and "disappeared" three Italian nationals: Angela Maria Aieta in 1976, and Giovanni Pegoraro and his pregnant daughter Susana Pegoraro in 1977. Susana was believed to have given birth in prison before her death, and it was suspected her child was given illegally for adoption by a military family.

On 27 January 1977 Dagmar Hagelin, a 17-year-old girl holding Swedish citizenship through her father Ragnar Hagelin, was shot and wounded by Astiz while attempting to escape capture. From the early 1980s, Ragnar Hagelin battled tirelessly to bring Astiz to justice. His wife and Dagmar's mother was an Argentine citizen named Buccicardi. Dagmar Hagelin was never found. In 2000 the Argentine government paid compensation to Ragnar Hagelin and his wife for their loss.

It was reported at the time that Astiz mistook Dagmar Hagelin for a Montonero activist to whom she bore some physical resemblance, and who was a mutual acquaintance of fellow-activist Norma Susana Burgos. Witnesses testified to having seen Hagelin later at the ESMA secret detention and torture center, and alleged that Astiz was in charge of her interrogation. She was never again seen alive.

According to the Argentine Vice-Minister of Foreign Affairs, tasked with following up Swedish complaints at the time of Hagelin's shooting and abduction, Lieutenant Commander Jorge Eduardo Acosta, commander of GT3.3.2, said that

"setting her [Hagelin] free is out of the question. We must not give in to public opinion. We must appear strong."

His resistance was believed to be related to the severity of the injuries she suffered in the shooting. Hagelin was said to be paralyzed and to have lost cognitive abilities. Inés Carazzo, a detainee enslaved and regularly raped by Captain Antonio Pernias, another GT332 officer, claims that Acosta ordered that Hagelin be put to death in a "death flight". Hagelin joined the ranks of the "disappeared" some time in 1977.

There is no direct evidence that Astiz had any part in Hagelin's treatment after shooting and kidnapping Hagelin. There is no evidence of who killed her.

Astiz was convicted of murdering Dagmar Hagelin, and committing other crimes, to a second lifetime sentence in 2017 after a five-year trial, together with his former boss Jorge Acosta. Dagmar's father, Ragnar Hagelin, had died the year before the conviction.

In December 1977 Astiz organized the kidnapping of about a dozen people associated with the Mothers of the Plaza de Mayo, including the founders Azucena Villaflor de Vicenti and two others. The non-violent group of mothers organized to learn the fates of their missing children and protested against the thousands of "disappeared." He also kidnapped two French nationals who were Catholic nuns, Léonie Duquet and Alice Domon. They had previously been caretakers for Jorge Videla's disabled son Alejandro. None were seen alive again after having been tortured at ESMA and "transferred" to be killed.

Astiz was witnessed torturing the nuns at ESMA by beating them, immersing them in water and applying electrified cattle prods to their breasts, genitals and mouths. A staged photograph intended to portray their support of the Montoneros, a Peronist leftist group, was leaked to the press. Despite repeated efforts by France to trace the nuns, the Argentine government denied all knowledge of them.

In late December 1977, unidentified bodies began washing up on beaches hundreds of kilometers south of Buenos Aires after heavy storms. Autopsies revealed they had died on impact, apparently having been thrown out of aircraft over the ocean, intended never to be discovered. In March 1978 Agence France-Presse reported that the bodies were believed to be the two nuns and several members of the Mothers of the Plaza de Mayo, but this was not confirmed by the government. These and other bodies washed ashore were buried in mass graves at General Lavalle Cemetery, about 400 kilometers south of Buenos Aires.

In July 2005 several bodies of unidentified women were found in a mass grave in General Lavalle Cemetery. Forensic DNA testing by the Argentine Forensic Anthropology Team identified the remains of Duquet, Azucena Villaflor de Vicenti, and two other founders of the Mothers of the Plaza in August 2005. Domon's remains have not been found.

== Falklands War ==
Astiz commanded a special team of fifteen Tactical Divers Group frogmen, dubbed los lagartos (the lizards), which carried out the first act of aggression in what developed into the Falklands War. On 19 March 1982 they landed on South Georgia, under the guise of workers of the Argentine scrap metal dealer Constantino Davidoff. Officially they were to scrap three derelict whaling stations at Leith Harbour which had been purchased by their employer in 1979. They dressed up in uniform and raised the Argentine flag in full view of a British Antarctic Survey party.

The next day, 20 March, the local head of the British Antarctic Survey handed Astiz a note transcribed from a radio message from the Governor of the Falklands. The communication ordered Astiz to take down the flag of Argentina and leave. Astiz took down the flag but did not leave. Later that day, HMS Endurance, the Royal Navy's ice patrol ship, was dispatched from Stanley on the Falklands to Grytviken, the main British Antarctic Survey base on South Georgia, with 22 Royal Marines with orders to evict him. They arrived on 23 March, a week before a number of Argentine Marines landed near Grytviken on 2 April. More Argentine marines arrived over the following days, and there was an armed clash at Grytviken. After damaging an Argentine frigate and shooting down an Aerospatiale Puma helicopter, inflicting casualties in both cases, the Royal Marines surrendered to superior force. The Royal Marines were repatriated to the United Kingdom and later took part in the recapture of the Falkland Islands.

The British Government reacted by sending in more forces to South Georgia, the Argentine garrison surrendering on 25 April 1982. Astiz insisted on signing a surrender document for himself and his small band although they were covered by the surrender of his commanding officer. As a result, Astiz was mistakenly publicized as the commander of the garrison on South Georgia.

Astiz rigged the island football pitch with explosives, and planned to detonate them killing the British officers receiving his surrender. At the last minute the wires leading to the explosives were spotted and the surrender venue was moved to HMS Plymouth, where Astiz freely admitted plotting to kill the British delegation, having also booby trapped nearby buildings. “The white flag obviously meant nothing to him” said British naval Captain Nick Barker who took Astiz's surrender.

=== Prisoners of war ===
Soon after the British recapture of South Georgia, Nicanor Costa Méndez, the Argentine Foreign Minister, said that Argentina was technically in a state of war with the UK. At about the same time an Argentine prisoner (Félix Artuso) was shot dead by a Royal Marine who mistakenly thought he was trying to scuttle a captured submarine. The United Kingdom Government informed Argentina through Brazilian diplomats that a board of inquiry would be convened under the provisions of the 1949 Geneva Conventions to review the death. The next day the United Kingdom claimed the Argentine prisoners were not prisoners of war because they were captured before Argentina had declared hostilities. Six days later they changed their mind. In a 1983 article, Meyer states that the United Kingdom's Government changed its position because it had already implied the Argentine detainees were prisoners of war by applying provisions of the Geneva Conventions.

About three weeks after the Argentine prisoners were captured, the United Kingdom announced that it would repatriate all 151 soldiers and 39 civilians, five of whom were not Argentine citizens, that it held in detention on South Georgia. Because of the publicity related to the surrender of Astiz, he came to the attention of the Swedish and French governments, which has been seeking justice for their citizens from Argentina, their embassies in London informing the Government of the United Kingdom that Astiz was accused of criminal acts against their nationals. As the Argentine prisoners were being shipped to Ascension Island to be handed over to the International Committee of the Red Cross (ICRC) and flown home, the Swedish Government asked the British Government to question Astiz. The French Government also made a request that Astiz be held while they sought legal pursuance for the "disappearances" of the nuns. Both countries stated that they had eyewitnesses for the "disappearances." The United Kingdom's Government's initial response was that concerned parties should talk to the I.C.R.C., as it would be taking custody of the prisoners. The I.C.R.C. refused the countries' requests to talk to Astiz if it took custody of him. Both nations in response stepped up diplomatic pressure on the United Kingdom not to transfer Astiz to the I.C.R.C. The United Kingdom decided to send home the 189 other detainees "as an act of compassion." Astiz was to be held until "the end of the belligerency", initially on Ascension Island.

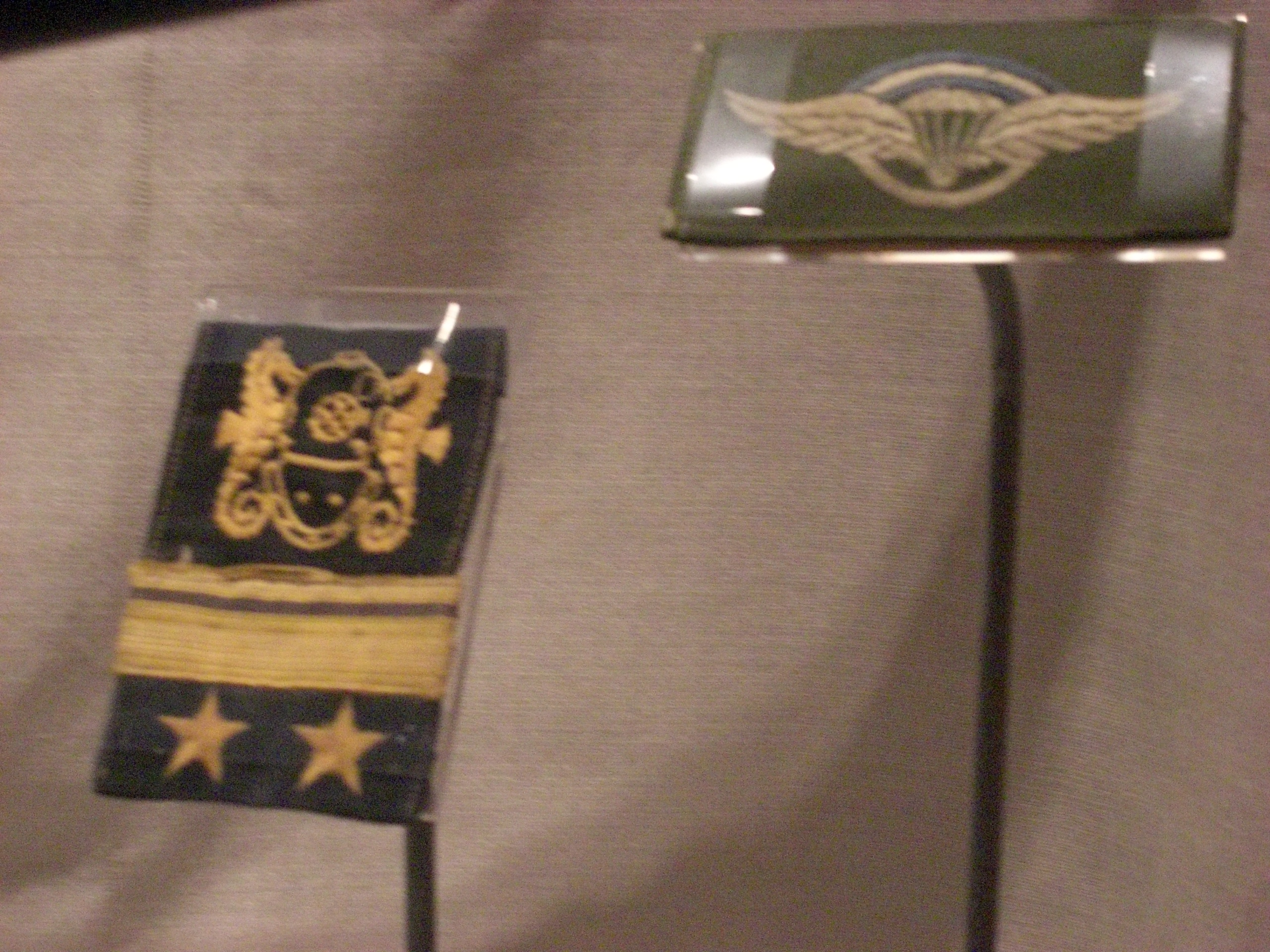
CPO2 and parachuters insignia displayed in the Imperial War Museum, London; one on the left is a Chief Petty Officer, or SubOfficial 2ndo

=== Repatriation ===
Two weeks later, under pressure from public opinion at home and by the French and Swedish governments, the United Kingdom decided to buy time by transporting Astiz by ship from Ascension Island to the United Kingdom. While Astiz was in transit, it announced he would be made available for interview by representatives of the French and Swedish Governments. Soon after, the Argentine government made veiled threats against the welfare of three British journalists they had under arrest as spies at that time in Argentina, and linked their release to that of Astiz. Astiz was questioned twice in June 1982 by a Detective Chief Superintendent of the Sussex Constabulary. Both times, Astiz remained silent. The United Kingdom gave a detailed report of the fruitless interviews to the Swedish and French Governments. Astiz was repatriated back to Argentina on 10 June 1982, just before the start of the battle for Port Stanley and the Argentine surrender on the Falkland Islands on 14 June 1982.

The United Kingdom Government had chosen to read the Third Geneva Convention of 1949, relating to the treatment of prisoners of war, as protecting Astiz from criminal prosecution in its jurisdiction and from extradition from it. Meyer argues that this was an incorrect reading but was justified at the time by four points. Astiz was in protective custody because of special circumstances, i.e. surrendering during war. The Geneva Conventions exhort custodial powers to leniency. Astiz was accused of crimes—kidnapping, wounding and torture—which were illegal in Argentina, and he could, in theory, be prosecuted there. Meyer argues that nothing in the Geneva Conventions expressly prohibited the prosecution or extradition of Astiz. However, the extradition treaties between Argentina and the UK, and Sweden and France, referred only to crimes committed within the territory of the requesting state and crimes against international law, while Astiz was accused of crimes committed in Argentina against their nationals which were not, at the time, crimes under international law. Consequently, he could not be handed over to another country. Criminal prosecution of Astiz within the UK was also not possible because he was not accused of any crimes against British subjects, their possessions or the British State.

Meyer argues that victims of Astiz, or their representatives, might have been successful in securing damages from him if they had brought a civil action while he was in the UK. As with criminal prosecution, nothing in the Geneva Conventions of 1949 remove the civil liability of prisoners of war for actions committed prior to capture. A British court has jurisdiction over a foreign tort whenever the defendant is in the UK, if the alleged act would have been actionable as a tort if committed in Britain, and it was an offence under the laws of the foreign country. Torture and kidnap by government officials is actionable as a tort if committed in England. Proving that it was an offence under the laws of Argentina would have been more difficult.

English courts assume that the authorised actions of officials of a foreign government within its sovereign territory are not actionable within their jurisdiction unless those actions are outside the scope of the powers of the government. Since torture is expressly forbidden in the Argentine constitution, Astiz could have been prosecuted for acting outside his powers as an agent of the Argentine government in torturing Domon and Duquet. Although there were witnesses prepared to testify that they had seen Astiz torture Alice Domon and Léonie Duquet, no prosecution of Astiz was made on these grounds at the time.

British government documents kept secret until released in 2012 under the thirty year rule revealed that Astiz was considered a major problem as a prisoner, that Astiz's custody on board ship was a breach of Article 22 of the Third Geneva Convention, (which states that prisoners must be held on land) and that there had been discrimination between Astiz and his men. There were also concerns for the safety of British prisoners held by Argentina. Within a few days of being taken prisoner he had assaulted a guard and later fashioned a "primitive dagger" from a bed spring. The Secretary of State for Defence, John Nott, felt that the only course of action was to "get him off our hands as soon as possible".

== Legal actions ==
On 16 March 1990 Astiz was convicted and sentenced in absentia to life imprisonment by a French Assize Court for his role in the torture and disappearance of the two French nuns, Alice Domon and Léonie Duquet. French law allows trials, in absentia if necessary, of foreigners accused of breaking French laws in other jurisdictions if the crimes are committed against French nationals.

For years, Astiz was protected by the Pardon Laws in 1986 and 1987 (the Ley de Punto Final and Ley de Obediencia Debida, respectively) which had shielded military and security officers from prosecution. He has several times been physically attacked by civilians; a well-known assault took place in Bariloche in the mid-1990s. In 1998 he told the Argentine magazine Trespuntos in an interview that he was "the best-trained man in Argentina to kill journalists and politicians". He also reportedly said "I'm not sorry for anything", and defended the actions of the military dictatorship. He was discharged from the military for his comments.

Astiz was arrested by Argentine police in July 2001. The Pardon Laws did not cover child abduction. Italy was seeking extradition of Astiz for the kidnapping and torture of three Italian nationals in 1976 and 1977, and for the abduction of a baby daughter born to one of them: Angela Maria Aieta in 1976, and the kidnapping of Giovanni Pegoraro and his pregnant daughter Susana Pegoraro in 1977. It is believed that Susana gave birth in prison before her death, and Astiz arranged for her baby to be given for illegal adoption to an Argentine military family. Argentine newspapers reported at the time of Astiz's arrest that the alleged daughter was living in the port city of Mar del Plata. Astiz was not extradited.

In 2005 the Argentine Supreme Court declared unconstitutional the amnesty laws introduced during the transition to democracy (Ley de Punto Final, 1986 and Ley de Obediencia Debida, 1987). Since the identification of Duquet's body, France has been seeking extradition of Astiz on charges of murdering Duquet.

After this ruling, the government re-opened prosecution of war crimes committed during the military dictatorship. In 2005, Astiz was detained on charges of kidnapping and torture, centered on the 12 victims of December 1977. Astiz and 17 other defendants associated with the operations at ESMA were "charged with various cases of kidnapping, torture, and murder relating to 86 victims". Following a 22-month trial, on 27 October 2011, Alfredo Astiz was convicted by an Argentinian court and sentenced to life imprisonment for crimes against humanity committed during the Dirty War.

Of the other defendants, 11 were also sentenced to life in prison, four received sentences ranging from 18 to 25 years, and two were acquitted. Since the Kirchner government started prosecuting cases again, Astiz is one of 259 people who by late 2011 had been convicted of human rights abuses committed during the dictatorship.

=== Charges of French intelligence participation ===
Along with Luis María Mendía, former chief of naval operations in 1976–77, Astiz testified in January 2007 before Argentine judges that a French intelligence agent, Bertrand de Perseval, had participated in the abduction of the two French nuns. Perseval, who lives today in Thailand, denied any links with the abduction. He has acknowledged being a former member of the Organisation armée secrète (OAS), an underground group which fought to subvert the French government of Charles de Gaulle, and having escaped to Argentina after the March 1962 Evian Accords, which ended the 1954–62 Algerian War.

It has long been alleged that France arranged to have its intelligence agents train their Argentine (and other Latin American) counterparts in the counter-insurgency techniques they used in the Algerian War, which included interrogation under torture. Referring to Marie Monique Robin's 2003 film documentary titled The Death Squads – the French School (Les escadrons de la mort – l'école française), which claims this, Mendía asked the Argentine Court to summon to court the former French president Valéry Giscard d'Estaing, the former French prime minister Pierre Messmer, the former French ambassador to Buenos Aires Françoise de la Gosse, and all those in office in the French embassy in Buenos Aires between 1976 and 1983. Besides this "French connection", Mendía has also blamed the former president Isabel Perón and the former ministers Carlos Ruckauf and Antonio Cafiero, who had signed anti-subversion decrees before Videla's 1976 coup d'état. According to the ESMA survivor Graciela Daleo, this is another tactic to absolve the perpetrators of culpability, as did the 1987 Obediencia Debida Act, by trying to shift it to the predecessors of the military government, and the French. Daleo points out that claiming to be obeying Isabel Perón's anti-subversion decrees is grotesque, as those who murdered in the name of the decrees were the ones who had deposed her.

== Personal life ==
=== Family ===
Born on November 8, 1951, into a traditional Argentine family of Mar del Plata origin, upper-middle class and Spanish Basque descent, his parents were Bernardo Astiz, a vice admiral of the Argentine Navy, and María Elena Vázquez, a housewife from whom Alfredo inherited his blonde phenotype and blue eyes. From his father he inherited his military vocation and from both parents the Argentine nationalist formation and common sadism that accompanies him to this day as a prisoner, serving a life sentence that has lasted a quarter of a century, the same time he served as a naval officer.

The values that were instilled in Alfredo Astiz by María Elena Vázquez are demonstrated by Miriam Lewin's testimony regarding Astiz's proclivities during his governance of Navy Petty-Officers School (commonly known as ESMA):

I believe there was an intention by Tigre Acosta and Alfredo Astiz to force and promote the sexual relationships [that is, the rapes of female prisoners] in the Escuela de Mecánica de la Armada and, I don't know if they did it consciously or by intuition, they were convinced that by gaining the bodies of the widows of disappeared victims, like the widow of Caride, the widow of Osatinsky, they could win the dirty war, it was sort of like of defeating the Montoneros women."

In the late 90s, a woman named Karina Mujica, who held a campaign in favour of Astiz, was revealed to be his girlfriend. In 2006, a media investigation discovered that Mujica was a VIP prostitute in the city of Mar del Plata.

=== Health ===
Astiz was diagnosed with pancreatic cancer in 2004. In October 2013 the Supreme Court ratified decisions of lower courts denying him the right to treatment in a military hospital, under a Defence Ministry resolution banning use of the facilities by personnel who had criminal convictions. Astiz said that the Ministry was trying to kill him and severely harm his health by denying him access to Pedro Mallo Naval Hospital, the only medical facility able to supply the care he needed.
