= Seysses =

- Commune
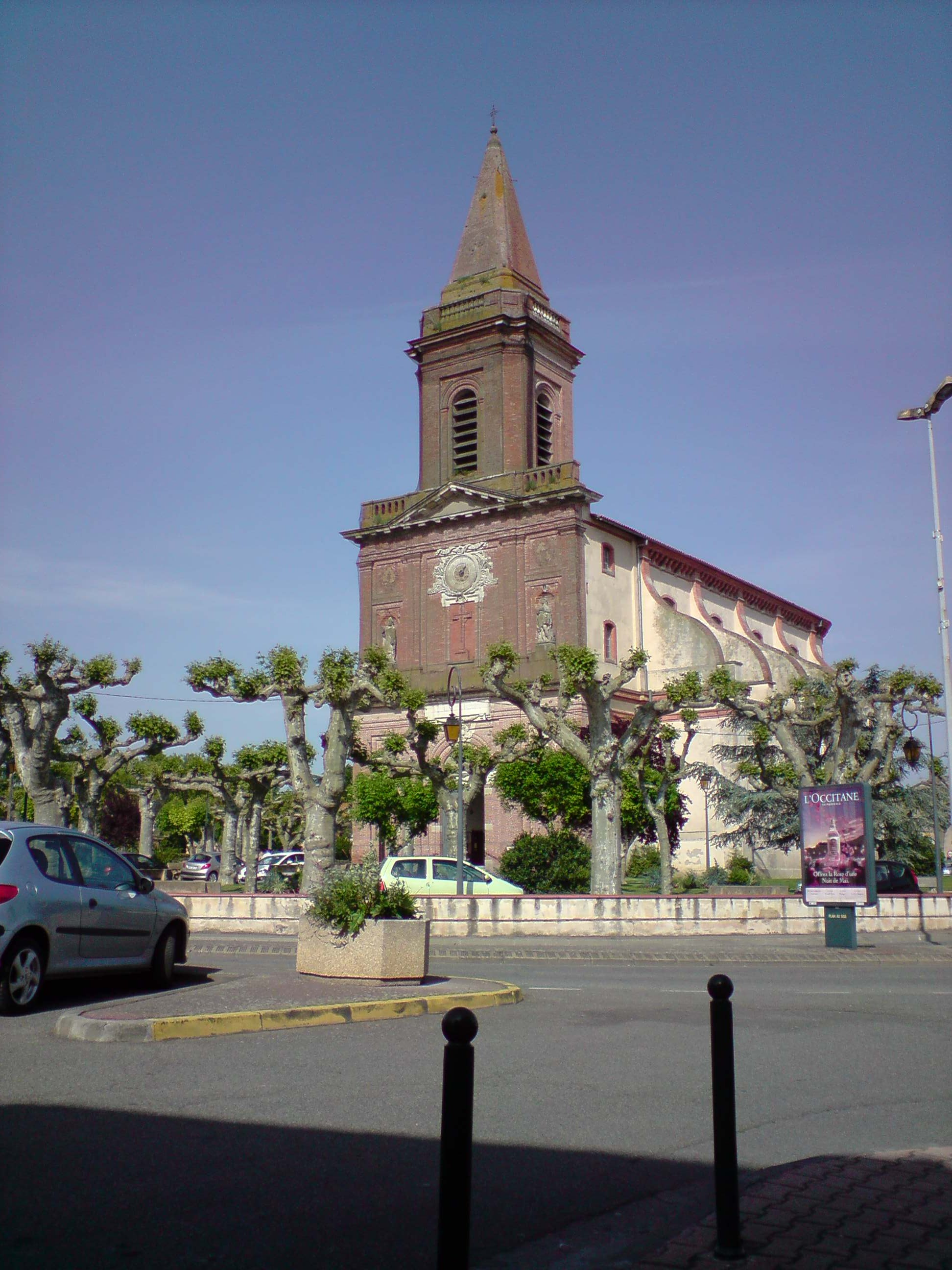
- The church in Seysses

- Coat of arms
- Location of Seysses
- Location within France Location within Occitanie
- Coordinates: 43°29′56″N 1°18′48″E
- Country: France
- Region: Occitania
- Department: Haute-Garonne
- Arrondissement: Muret
- Canton: Muret
- Intercommunality: Le Muretain Agglo

Government
  - Mayor (2020–2026): Jérôme Bouteloup
- Area^{1}: 25.26 km^{2} (9.75 sq mi)
- Highest elevation: 182 m (597 ft)
- Lowest elevation: 160 m (520 ft)
- Population (2023): 10,539
  - Density: 417.2/km^{2} (1,081/sq mi)
- Time zone: UTC+01:00 (CET)
  - Summer (DST): UTC+02:00 (CEST)
- INSEE/Postal code: 31547 /31600
- ^{1} French Land Register data, which excludes lakes, ponds, glaciers > 1 km^{2} (0.386 sq mi or 247 acres) and river estuaries.

Seysses (French pronunciation: [sɛs]; Occitan: Sèishes) is a commune in the Haute-Garonne department, southwestern France.

It is located 19 km south of Toulouse and 5 km north of Muret.

== Population ==
Historical population
Year	Pop.	±% p.a.
1968	2,229	—
1975	3,136	+5.00%
1982	4,221	+4.34%
1990	5,074	+2.33%
1999	5,753	+1.41%
2007	7,511	+3.39%
2012	7,910	+1.04%
2017	9,055	+2.74%
2023	10,539	+2.56%
Source: INSEE

== See also ==
- Communes of the Haute-Garonne department
