= Death flights =

Form of extrajudicial killing

Death flights (Spanish: vuelos de la muerte) are a form of extrajudicial killing in which victims are dropped to their deaths from airplanes or helicopters and their bodies land in oceans, large rivers or mountains. Death flights have been carried out by governments during a number of internal conflicts, including by France during the 1947 Malagasy Uprising in Madagascar and the 1957 Battle of Algiers, and by the National Reorganization Process which ruled Argentina and waged the Dirty War between 1976 and 1983. During the Bougainville conflict, Papua New Guinea Defence Force (PNGDF) helicopters were used to dispose of corpses of detainees who had died under torture, and in some cases, still-living victims.

== Countries ==
=== Argentina ===
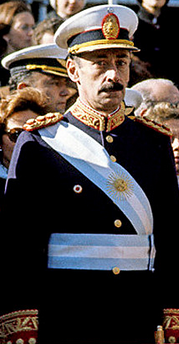
Jorge Rafael Videla, dictator of Argentina from 1976–1983

During the 1976–1983 Argentine Dirty War, many thousands of people disappeared, having been clandestinely kidnapped by groups acting for the dictatorship. According to the National Commission on the Disappearance of Persons 8,961 persons disappeared between 1976 and 1983. Human rights groups in Argentina often cite a figure of 30,000 disappeared; Amnesty International estimates 20,000. Many were killed in death flights, a practice initiated by Admiral Luis María Mendía, usually after detention and torture. Typically they were drugged into a stupor, loaded into an aircraft, stripped, and dropped into the Río de la Plata or the Atlantic Ocean.

According to the testimony of Adolfo Scilingo, a former Argentinian naval officer convicted in Spain in 2005 for crimes against humanity under the doctrine of universal jurisdiction, there were 180–200 death flights during 1977 and 1978. Scilingo confessed to participating in two such flights, during which 13 and 17 people were killed, respectively. Scilingo estimated that the Argentine Navy conducted the flights every Wednesday for two years, 1977 and 1978, killing 1,500 to 2,000 people.

Victims were sometimes made to dance for joy in celebration of the freedom they were told awaited them. In an earlier 1996 interview, Scilingo said, "They were played lively music and made to dance for joy, because they were going to be transferred to the south. ... After that, they were told they had to be vaccinated due to the transfer, and they were injected with Pentothal. And shortly after, they became really drowsy, and from there we loaded them onto trucks and headed off for the airfield." At the time, Scilingo said that the Argentine Navy was "still hiding what happened during the Dirty War".

In May 2010, Spain extradited pilot Julio Alberto Poch to Argentina. Born in 1952, Poch had been arrested in Valencia, Spain, on September 23, 2009, and was wanted in Argentina for his alleged participation as a pilot on the death flights. At his trial in February 2013, Poch denied that he had participated in the death flights, claiming everything he knew about them came from what he had read. After spending eight years in an Argentine jail, Poch was found not guilty by a court in Buenos Aires.

In April 2015, further arrests were made. It was reported that the death flights had started before 1976, and continued until 1983. To carry out the flights, a military unit, Batallón de Aviación del Ejército 601 (Army Air Battalion 601), was set up, with a commander, sub-commander, chief of staff, and officers from five companies. Soldiers who refused to take part, as well as others who acted as airfield guards and runway cleaners, testified they had seen live people and corpses loaded onto aircraft; after taking off, the planes returned empty.

On 12 March 2016, Interpol, through the National Police of Colombia, arrested Juan Carlos Francisco Bossi in the city of Medellín. Also known as El doctor, Bossi was accused of activating the death flights during the Dirty War and was wanted by Argentine authorities for taking part in death flights and forced disappearances of over 30,000 people. After his arrest, Bossi confessed to the Colombian authorities to being responsible for the deaths of 6,000 individuals.

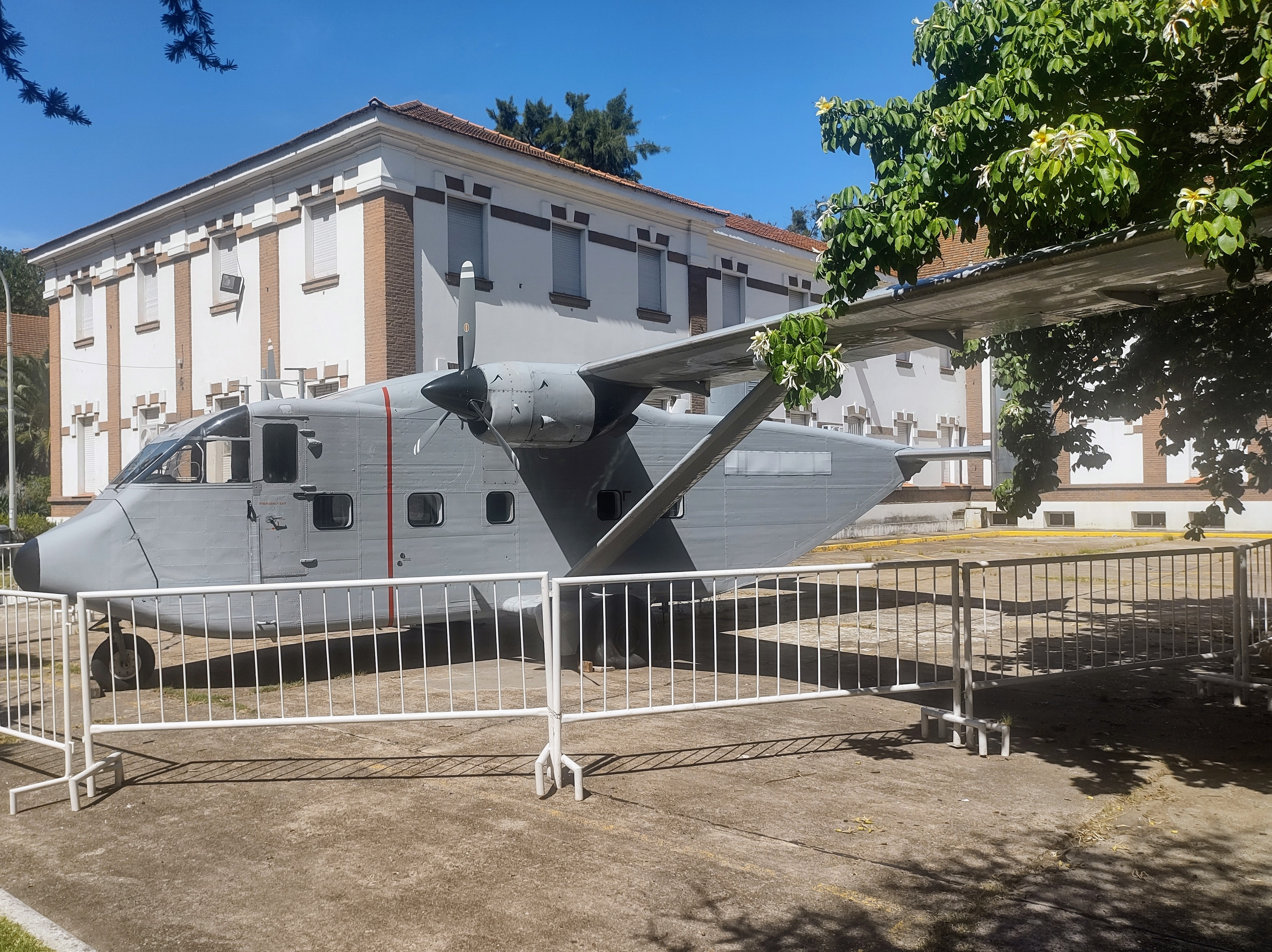
Short Skyvan 'PA-51', one of the original aircraft used for "death flights", now on display at Museo Sitio de Memoria ESMA

Meanwhile, in 2003, Italian photographer Giancarlo Ceraudo had become intrigued by the death flights and, with the assistance of the investigative journalist Miriam Lewin, began looking for the aircraft that had been used. Lewin was a survivor of the Navy School of Mechanics (ESMA), which was one of the dictatorship's most notorious detention, torture and extermination centres. They believed that PNA - Argentina Naval Prefecture Short SC.7 Skyvans were among the aircraft that had participated in the death flights. By this time, the PNA had lost two Skyvans in the Falklands War, and had sold the remaining three. In 2010 Ceraudo and Lewin eventually tracked down one of these remaining Skyvan aircraft (serial number 'PA-51') to Fort Lauderdale, Florida, where it was owned by GB Airlink, whose then owner allowed a Miami-based Argentinian sports journalist acting on their behalf to visit the aircraft and also provided all its flight logs, among which was one covering the period of the death flights. A three-hour flight entry on 14 December 1977 led to the identification and 2017 conviction of pilots, Mario Daniel Arrú and Alejando Domingo D'Agostino for the murder of eight women and four men. A third crew member Enrique José de Saint Georges, was charged but died of natural causes while awaiting trial. The victims had been tortured and sedated before being loaded on the aircraft and their clothing was removed by members of the crew. In the air the Skyvan's ramp door was opened and the captives were pushed out to fall thousands of feet to their death in the South Atlantic.

Meanwhile, GB Airlink had sold PA-51 to Win Aviation, headquartered in DeKalb, Illinois. In early 2023 it was announced that the company's owner, Andri Wiese, had agreed to allow it to be purchased by the Argentinean Economy Ministry. The plane was flown back to Argentina and is now on display at the Espacio Memoria y Derechos Humanos in Buenos Aires.

A five-year trial (nicknamed the "ESMA mega-trial" or "Death Flights trial") of 54 former Argentine officials accused of running death flights and other crimes against humanity (lesa humanidad) heard 830 witnesses and investigated the death of 789 victims. A verdict was reached on 29 November 2017: 29 defendants were sentenced to life in prison, six were acquitted, and the nineteen remaining defendants were sentenced to prison terms ranging from eight to 25 years.

=== Chile ===
Oregier Benavente, Augusto Pinochet's former personal helicopter pilot, has claimed that on numerous occasions he threw prisoners into the ocean or into the high peaks of the Andes.

Flights were also used to make bodies of already murdered dissidents disappear. One person's testimony described the procedure: corpses were put in gunny sacks; each sack was attached to a piece of rail using wire, and a second gunny sack put around both. The sacks were carried by pickup truck to helicopters that flew them to the coast of the Valparaíso region, where the bodies were thrown into the ocean. Secret police agent Osvaldo Romo confessed in a 1995 interview to having participated in death flights. Showing no remorse, he added, "Now, would it not be better throwing bodies into a volcano?"

In 2001, Chilean President Ricardo Lagos told the nation that during Pinochet's rule, 120 civilians had been tossed from helicopters into "the ocean, the lakes and the rivers of Chile".

During the 1973 upheavals, one man in the town of Neltume, Luís Ancapi, reportedly survived a death flight by falling into a "mattress" of Chusquea quila.

=== Colombia ===
During the Violencia (1948–1958), the Colombian military had dissenters thrown from airplanes above areas under the control of guerrillas.

=== France ===
==== French Algeria ====
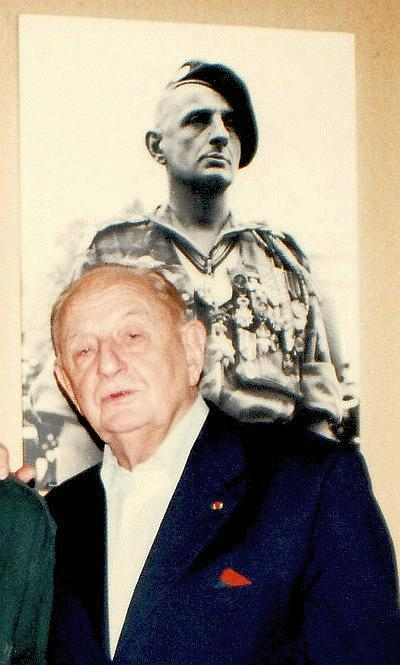
Death flights victims during the Algerian War were known as crevettes Bigeard ("Bigeard's shrimp"), after French General Marcel Bigeard (pictured)

Death flights were used during the Algerian War by French paratroopers of the 10th Parachute Division under Jacques Massu during the Battle of Algiers (1957). After it was discovered that corpses sometimes resurfaced after being disposed in this manner, the executioners began attaching concrete blocks to their victims' feet. These victims came to be known as "Bigeard's shrimp" (crevettes Bigeard), after one of the paratrooper commanders, Marcel Bigeard.

==== French Madagascar ====
During the Malagasy Uprising of 1947, hundreds of Malagasy in Mananjary were killed, including 18 women and a group of prisoners thrown from aircraft.

=== Indonesian occupation of East Timor ===
During its occupation of East Timor, Indonesian forces are alleged to have thrown suspected guerrillas and independence supporters from helicopters, many into lake Tasitolu, just west of the capital Dili. Other locations where detainees were thrown from aircraft include the rocky mountains between Dili and Aileu, in Dili Bay, and in the sea around Jaco Island near the eastern tip of the island. Security forces developed various euphemisms to refer to these flights including mandi laut ("taking a bath in the sea") referring to the practice of weighting the bodies of suspects with rocks and dumping them from a helicopter into the sea, piknik ke Builico ("going for a picnic to Builico") a.k.a. being dumped in the Sarei River ravine near Builico, and dipanggil ke Quelicai ("called to Quelicai"). One of the most prominent victims was Venâncio Gomes da Silva, a former FRETILIN central committee member. According to Amnesty International, on July 14, 1980, he was put on a helicopter and flown south-east in the direction of Remexio; the helicopter returned without him 15 minutes later.

=== Papua New Guinea ===
During the Bougainville conflict which was fought in 1988–1998, the Papua New Guinea Defence Force used the death flight method to dispose of the bodies of tortured rebels who died in Bougainville region. Some among the disposed victims were found out to be still alive when their bodies were disposed.

=== South Africa ===
In 12 July 1979, the South African apartheid government started implementing death flight executions of rebel group fighters. To do this, the government created a special branch of the South African Defence Force called the Delta 40. Hundreds of ANC-, PAC-, and SWAPO-affiliated activists and guerrilla fighters were thrown into the Atlantic Ocean off the Namibian coast during the height of the South African Border War.

Aircraft were also used to dispose of the bodies of prisoners killed by other means beforehand; in one example, five members of a RENAMO rebel faction who assassinated Orlando Christina, the group's secretary general in April 1983. The suspects were first flown to the Caprivi strip where they were tried by the RENAMO war council, and shot. Their bodies were then wrapped in tarps, weighted, and dropped over the Atlantic, with a false flight plan drawn up. Experimental victims of Project Coast were likewise disposed of.

=== Zaire ===
During the Mobutu era, an unknown number of people were extrajudicially executed by being dropped from helicopters into the Zaire River, the Kinsuka Rapids or Lake Kapolowe in the Shaba region. In addition to killing still living prisoners, the corpses of prisoners tortured to death by the security services in Kinshasa were disposed of by being dropped into the Zaire river, under the guise of a nighttime helicopter border patrol.

== See also ==
- Enforced disappearance
- Disappeared detainees of the Dirty War
- Operation Condor
