= Alberto Ángel Zanchetta =

Father Alberto Ángel Zanchetta was Secretary and General Chancellor of Ordinariato Castrense (Military Bishopric) of Argentina.

Fr. Alberto A. Zanchetta Summary Roman Catholic Priest. Diocese of the Military Services

Minister 24 November 1973, Archdiocese of Buenos Aires, Argentina Consecrated priest by John C. Cardinal Aramburu Login Military Status 01/04/1984 He reached the degree of Commander (O-5) Argentine Navy Navy Chaplain, Military Ordinariate, Argentina 1984–2008

Chaplain, Navy Operations Command 2006 Chaplain, Argentine Navy Force, UN Peace Mission in Haití 2005 Chancellor & Secretary, Military Ordinariate 2003–2004 Chaplain, Training Ship ARA Libertad 1988; 1992 & 1999 Navy Training Division - OCS & NCO Academy 2000–2002 Chaplain, Navy Officer Academy 1993–1998 Navy Fleet 1984-1986 and 1989–1991 Navy Infantry Command (Marine). 1987

Archdiocese of Buenos Aires, Argentina 1973-1983 & 2008 present

Professor Catholic University Argentina 1978–1983 Professor Catholic University La Plata 2010 Parochial Vicar, Saint Peter 2009 Chaplain, Champagnat High School 1981–1983 Chaplain, John Fernández Hospital 1980–1983 Parochial Vicar, Saint Ramón 1978–1979 Parochial Vicar, Heart of Jesus 1977 Parochial Vicar, Our Lady of Lourdes 1975–1976 Parochial Vicar, Saint Cayetano 1974 Education Metropolitan Seminary, Arch. Buenos Aires 1965–1972 Catholic University Argentina Faculty Philosophy and Letters 1968 Faculty of Canon Law 1994-1998 Magister ethics to the social doctrine Light Church 2010-2012
