= Navy Petty-Officers School =

Argentine naval school and detention site

Coordinates: 34.5384°S 58.4636°W

Navy School of Mechanics
- Escuela de Mecánica de la Armada
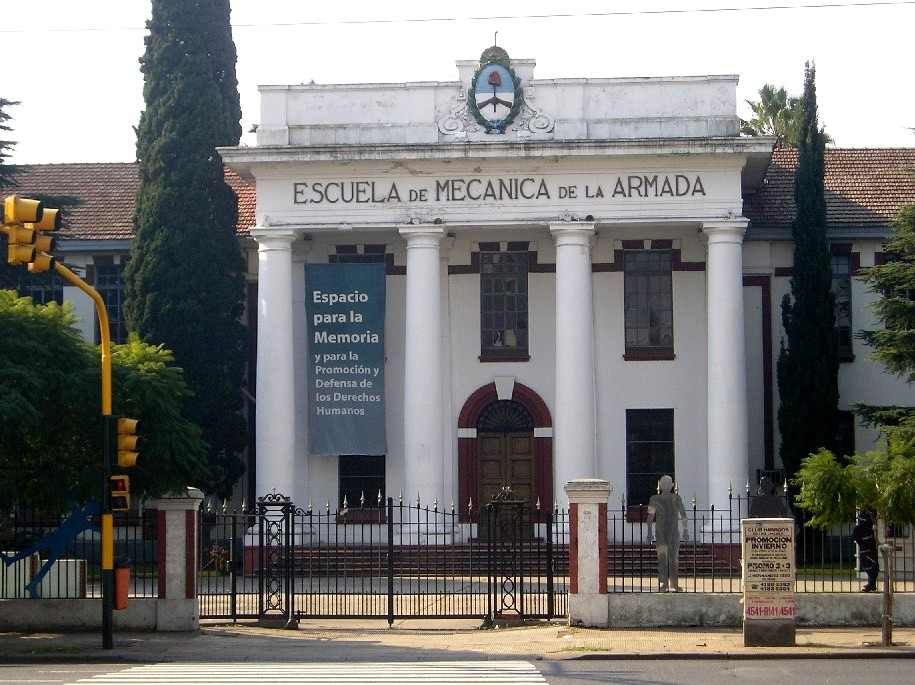
- Interactive map of the Navy School of Mechanics area
- Former names: Escuela Superior de Mecánica de la Armada

General information
- Location: Núñez, Buenos Aires, Argentina

UNESCO World Heritage Site
- Official name: ESMA Museum and Site of Memory – Former Clandestine Center of Detention, Torture and Extermination
- Type: Cultural
- Criteria: vi
- Designated: 2023 (45th session)
- Reference no.: 1681

The Higher School of Mechanics of the Navy of Argentina (Spanish: Escuela Superior de Mecánica de la Armada, commonly referred to by its acronym ESMA) is a museum in Buenos Aires. It has gone through three major transformations throughout its history. Originally ESMA served as an educational facility of the Argentine Navy. The original ESMA was a complex located at 8151 Libertador Avenue, in the barrio of Núñez. Additionally, It was the seat of U.T.3.3.2—Unidad de Tareas (Task Unit) 2 of G.T.3.3 [es].

However, ESMA later operated as an illegal, secret detention center for opponents of the 1976–1983 military dictatorship, described as "subversives" during what was described as the Dirty War. The military took the babies born to mothers imprisoned there, suppressed their true identities, and allowed military families and associates of the regime to illegally adopt them. The Unidad de Tareas (Task Unit) was responsible for thousands of instances of forced disappearance, torture, and murder during this time. ESMA was the largest detention center of its kind during the Dirty War.

The ESMA building has been converted into a memorial museum to show and honor those who were "disappeared" during Argentina's Dirty War. The National Congress passed a law on 5 August 2004 that converted the ESMA complex into a museum, the Space for Memory and for the Promotion and Defense of Human Rights (Espacio para la Memoria y para la Promoción y Defensa de los Derechos Humanos). On 10 June 2014 the Museo Malvinas was inaugurated in the ESMA campus, a museum about the islands disputed and fought over by the United Kingdom (calling them Falkland Islands) and Argentina (Islas Malvinas).

The site was designated a UNESCO World Heritage Site in 2023 under the name 'ESMA Museum and Site of Memory – Former Clandestine Center of Detention, Torture and Extermination'.

In 2001, the School, once again legitimate, was renamed Escuela de Suboficiales de la Armada (ESSA; English: Navy Petty-Officers' School), and moved in 2005 to the Puerto Belgrano Naval Base, 28 kilometres (17 mi) from the city of Bahía Blanca, and about 600 kilometres (370 mi) southwest of Buenos Aires.

== History ==
=== Functions and authorities ===
==== Legitimate ====
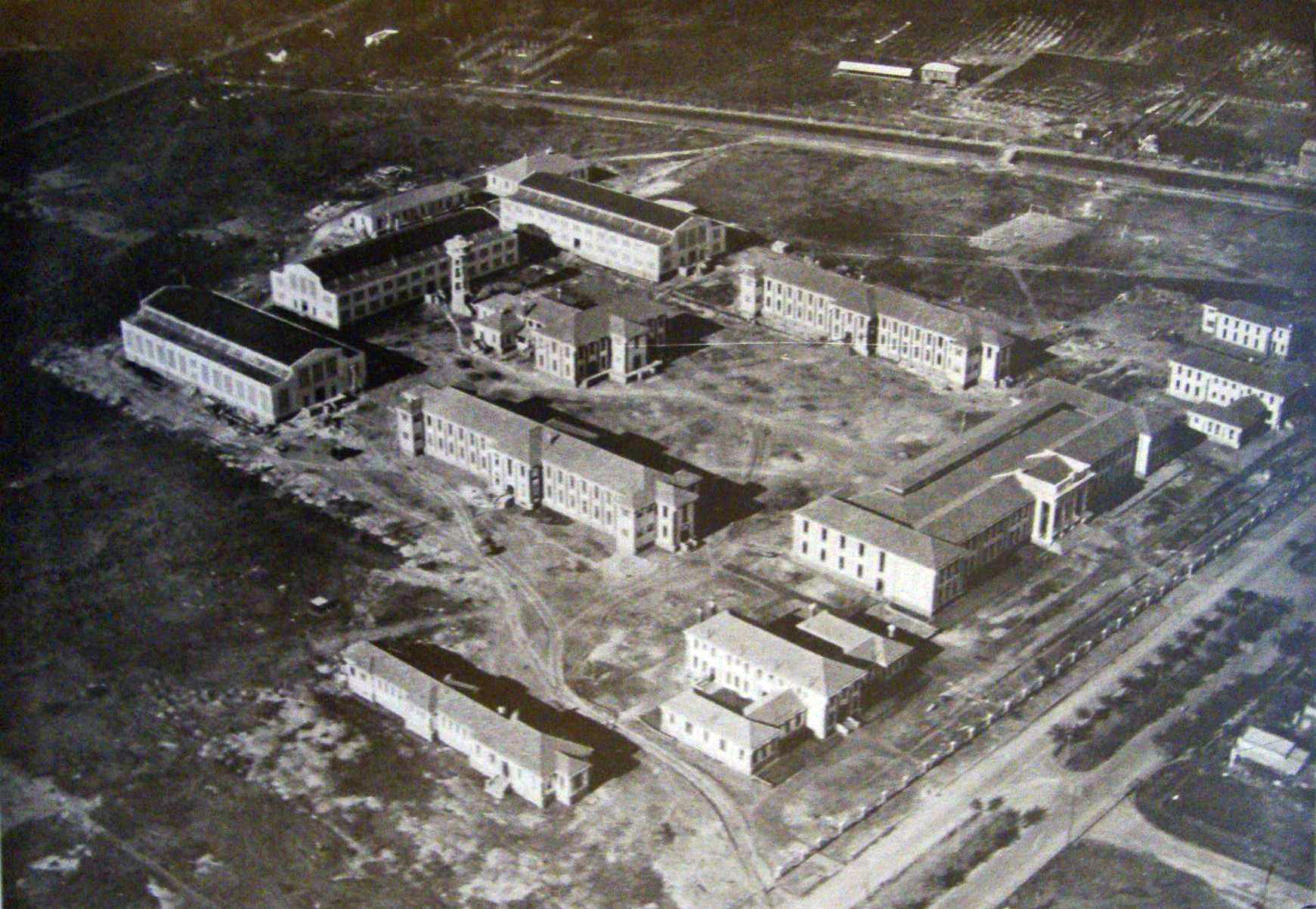
Under construction in 1928

According to the ESSA Web site, in 1897 the Escuela de Aprendices Mecánicos de la Armada (Navy Apprentice Mechanics School) was founded in premises that are now the Historical Naval Museum of Tigre, in Buenos Aires Province. In 1900 the School moved to naval workshops in Dársena Norte; in 1902 it became Escuela de Aprendices Mecánicos y Foguistas (Apprentice Mechanics and Stokers School). Two years later it became Escuela de Mecánicos de la Armada, and in 1911 Escuela de Mecánica de la Armada. In 1928 it moved to its later notorious premises, designed by the architect Raúl J. Álvarez, on Blandengues street (now Avenida del Libertador), between Arroyo Medrano and the extension of Deheza street. Once again a legitimate educational establishment, it was renamed Escuela de suboficiales de la Armada in 2001, and moved to Puerto Belgrano in 2005, merging the NCO schools of the Argentina Marines and the Argentine Naval Aviation in the process into one institution.

Other sources say that the School was founded in 1924, on land granted that year by the Municipality of Buenos Aires to the Ministry of the Navy by a decree that year, during the presidency of Marcelo T. de Alvear. Under the terms of the decree, it was to revert to the city if it ceased to be a military educational establishment. The School of Mechanics, Naval War School, and Officers' Mess were built on the land.

Each year about 10,000 boys, all high school graduates signed up to enter as regular students, of whom around half were admitted and given scholarships for courses of study such as electronics, aeronautics, management, marine engineering (mecánico naval), radio operation, meteorology, and oceanography. The students lived in the complex from Monday through Friday, taking 8 to 10 hours of classes per day. The degrees could be completed in up to three years of studies, with the students receiving the degree of técnico ("technician"), with the option of continuing either as naval servicemen, professional army, or air force NCOs or working elsewhere either in the public or private sector. Those chosen to join the Navy were welcomed as petty officers of the sea services branches.

The main entrance opens onto the central pavilion, where the authorities' offices were located. A covered patio there was used to show movies to the student body. To the left of this building was petty officers' housing, and further off and separated, the officers' housing, where the clandestine detention center operated during the 1976-1983 military dictatorship. To the right of the central pavilion were the checkpoint, the military guard building, and the Naval War College (Escuela de Guerra Naval).

Behind, at the rear, were the dormitories and, across Avenida Lugones, the institution's sports field. On the perimeter of the school were checkpoints which were staffed by the students in rotating shifts, at least one week per year for each student.

In 1982, 230 final-year students of the ESMA were drafted as NCOs to fight in the Falklands War; some of them died in the sinking of the ARA Belgrano and the attack on ARA Alférez Sobral.

In 1998, president Carlos Menem ordered the move of the School to the Puerto Belgrano base, and the use of the old campus as a museum. It was granted the name ESSA in 1999 as the by now sole NCO school of the Navy and continues to function in the Puerto Belgrano base.

=== Etymology and usage during the Dirty War ===
Almost 5,000 people were abducted and held in the original ESMA campus in its active participation in the Dirty War between 1976-1983; all except 150 were killed during or after interrogation and torture. When announcements were made that prisoners were to be "transferred", people came to understand they were going to be executed. The prisoners were taken to the basement, sedated, and then killed, some by shooting, others in death flights: they were flown over the Atlantic Ocean or the Río de la Plata and pushed out of the aircraft. These are only some examples of the many treatments that prisoners of the ESMA were forced to experience during the kidnappings that forced them into clandestine detention centers.

==== Extrajudicial detention center ====
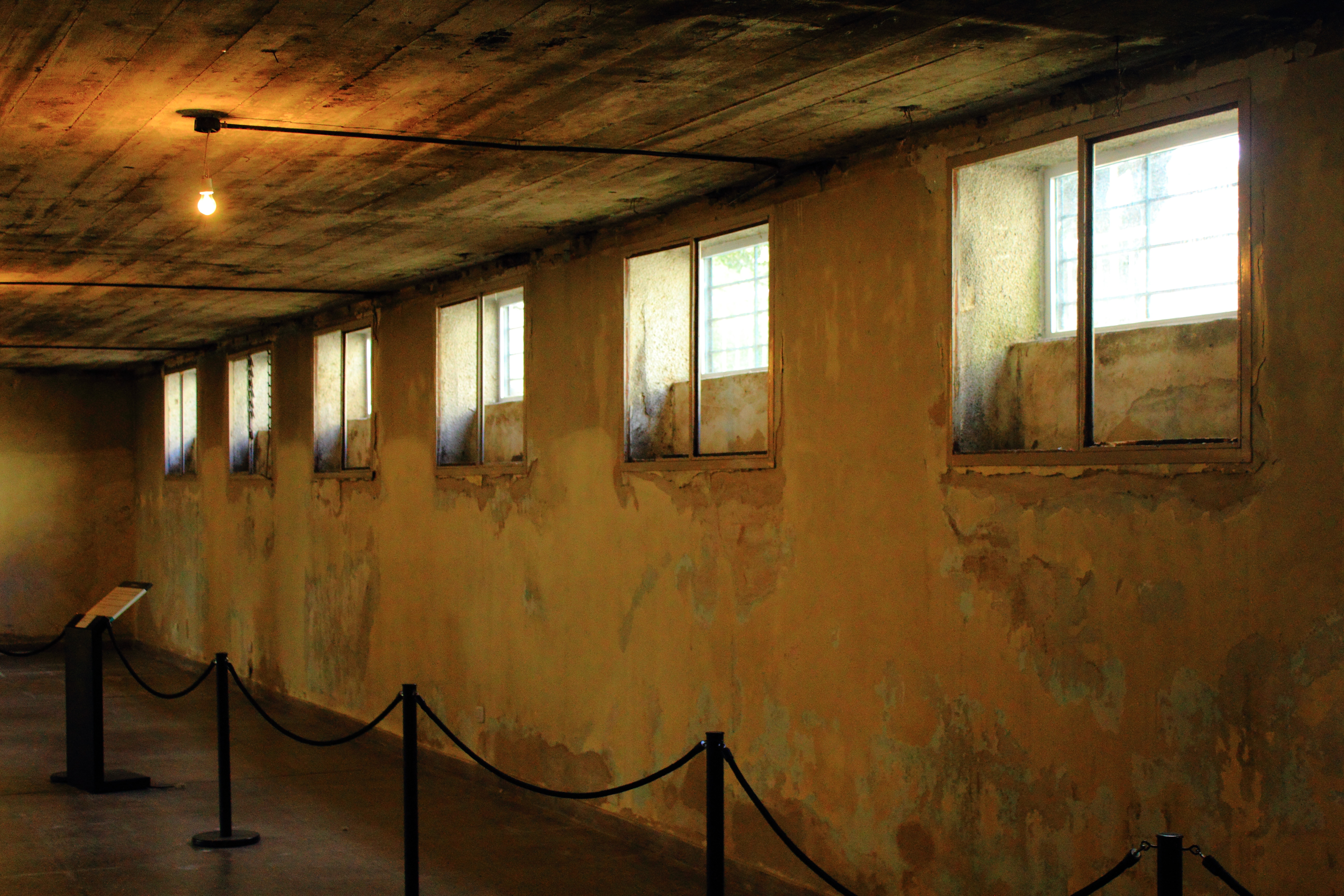
Basement where the "subversives" were kept

The ESMA was used as a detention center from the very start of the 1976 dictatorship: on 24 March, the day of the coup d'état, several people kidnapped by the Armed Forces were taken there.

Task Unit 3.2.2 was led by Rear-Admiral Rubén Jacinto Chamorro and Captain Carlos Acosta Ambone. Jorge Vildoza has been identified by survivors as the second-in-command of ESMA. Among the Task Unit's ranks were Jorge Eduardo Acosta, Alfredo Astiz, Ricardo Miguel Cavallo and Adolfo Scilingo, who became notorious as torturers. Astiz was known as the "Blond Angel of Death". Its chaplain during 1977 was Father Alberto Ángel Zanchetta. It was in charge of the city of Buenos Aires proper and the northern part of the metropolitan area (Gran Buenos Aires). Officers in charge were under strict orders not to reveal their identities or military affiliation when capturing prisoners.

Between 1976 and 1978, the group was ultimately under the orders of Navy Commander-in-Chief Emilio Eduardo Massera. Massera had reportedly been present when the unit was set up, gave an opening speech to the officers, and personally participated in the first illegal detentions.

==== Layout of the ESMA ====
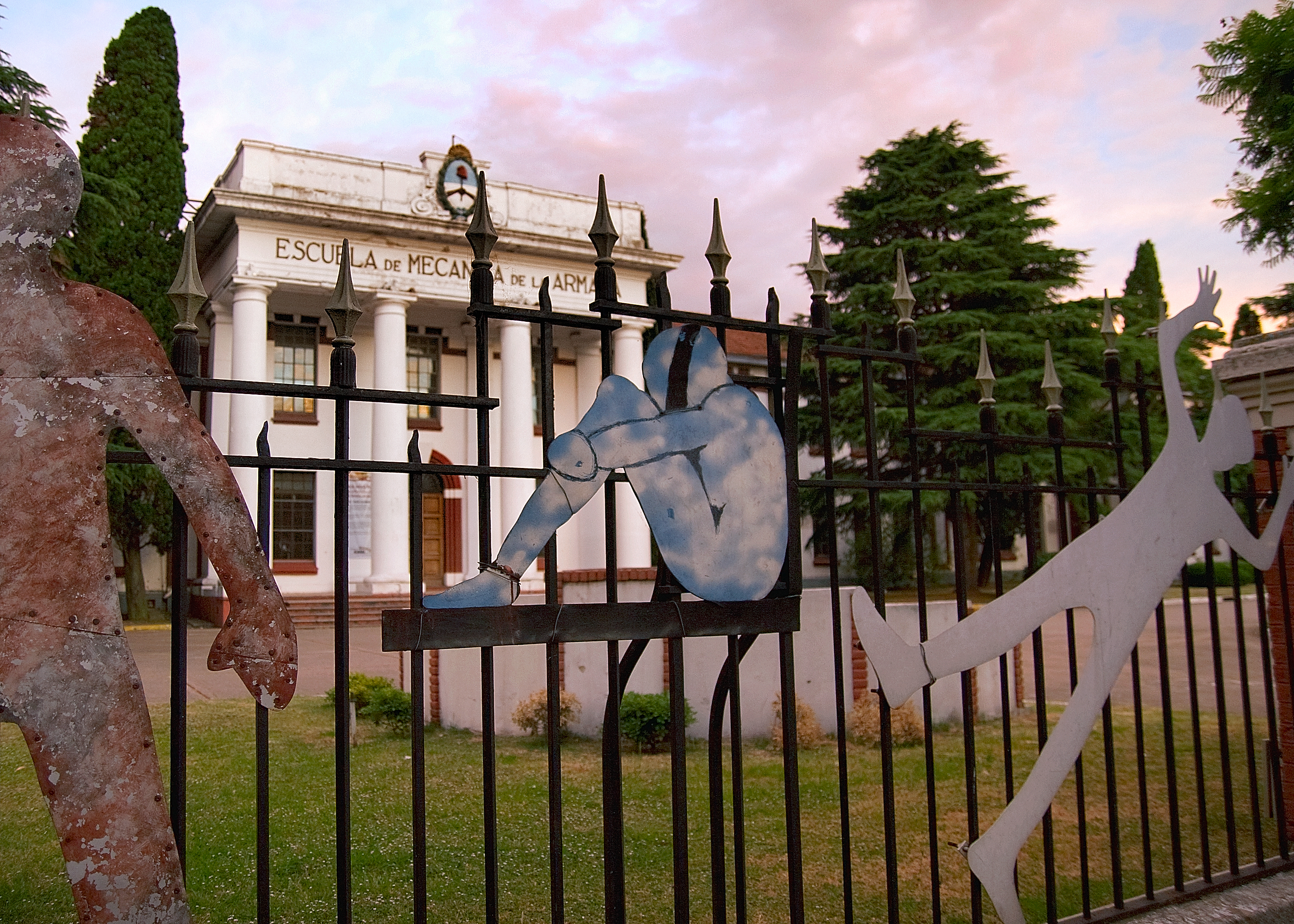
Artistic Representation of the victims of ESMA

Once kidnapped, it was very rare that these prisoners would return home, leaving loved ones wondering if they would ever see their family members or friends again. During the beginning stages of the Dirty War, Argentinians living in Buenos Aires were unaware that the building that once housed a school had been transformed into a center for punishing "subversion". Once the prisoners had arrived to this new "renovation", their basic human rights would be ignored. Instead, they were taken to certain floors depending on their status of punishment in an effort to dehumanize the victims. The basement contained interrogation rooms and a station meant for taking and maintaining photographs of each of the prisoners. These photos would allow victims to be recorded, providing an accurate count today as to the five thousand people who died due to the treatment within this camp. The first floor was staged as an operation room for the leaders of the torture to plan, execute, and continue their efforts to punish the prisoners. The second and third floors were adequately furnished and kept, as these were the floors where the officers lived and slept. These officers were committed to torturing the dissidents, contributing twenty four hours, seven days a week of fear for the victims who never knew when the next hit would happen. Also on the third floor, extending to the fourth floor, was an area known as the "capucha", or hood. This was where prisoners were kept, and this was where conditions were purposefully kept dark and hopeless.

==== Who became los desaparecidos/the disappeared? ====
There were certain types of individuals within Argentinian society who were to be kidnapped and removed from it. Stories show, for example, that there was a disproportionate number of Jews taken in custody, shedding light on anti-Semitic victimization. Another group targeted included the people who potentially supported a different government, opposing the current junta and military dictatorship of Argentina. If there was any suspicion that Argentinians were meeting secretly and consistently to resist General Jorge Rafael Videla and his regime, the government would kidnap these people and place them in detention centers such as the ESMA. This would serve as a lesson to incite fear within other members of the community who were also against the current governmental structure of Argentina. Upon being kidnapped, for example, many kidnappers would interrogate the prisoners about why they were opposing the Argentinian dictatorship and spreading a new political ideology, disregarding the fact of whether or not this was actually the case.

==== Survivor stories of the ESMA ====
A few victims that survived and escaped the ESMA have made it a priority to share their experiences of the torture and human rights infractions they faced while living in this center.

===== Ana María Martí =====
One detainee who survived, Ana María Martí, has related some of the horrific treatment she faced while in the confines of the ESMA. By the time she was captured, information was out that this torture center was something to fear. When she was kidnapped, the officers who snatched her laughed at the fear she had at the mention of the ESMA. Once she arrived, her stories telling her torture resembled the other stories that have been told by those lucky enough to survive. The main goal of the ESMA officers was to inflict as much pain as was possible, testing every victim's capability of surviving amidst deathly circumstances. Just within the basement floor of the interrogation methods, victims were subjugated to electric shocks, humiliating treatments, and removal of genitalia and other organs of the human body.

The "capucha" of the ESMA was another terrifying area within this clandestine detention center. After the initial torturing and interrogations, prisoners were chained on the third floor and left alone while hooded (hence the name of the "capucha"). They were left in complete darkness with no communication, forced to be isolated in another way to instigate panic and fear for the prisoners. Eventually, night and day turned into one continual nightmare once prisoners became more veteran members of this torture site. Ana María Martí survived these horrid conditions, but she witnessed many other of her fellow victims suffer and die at the hands of the officers. She remarked that prisoners would begin to know when someone was about to be taken to the killing chambers; in order to prepare, the ESMA would properly feed and take care of the victims to bulk them up. This was in a concerted effort to make the eventual corpses seem more healthy and less connected to the operations of the ESMA.

===== Susana Reyes =====
Susana Reyes recalled that when it came time to shower, the bathrooms had no doors, which the guards took advantage of to objectify the women. The guard would yell obscenities and make sexually explicit comments to the women while they were showering. Leading Susana Reyes to decide to always shower fully dressed. One day Susana Reyes defied an authority after a nasty remark about her body which led to her being tied up and brutally beaten with a baton. Susana Reyes was an expecting mother in the ESMA and was gifted a hood for her unborn child. The hood was meant to be used for psychological torture since the tiny hood was meant to symbolize the "capucha" and seal the baby's fate to a life of torture and suffering alongside her mother. On the contrary, there was a guard who could take good care of Susana Reyes especially when she became ill. However, that same guard would taunt Susana Reyes by saying "take care of him" insinuating that he was going to take away her child in order to raise it as his own. Fortunately, Susana Reyes escaped ESMA before giving birth to her child.

==== Killing methods in the ESMA ====
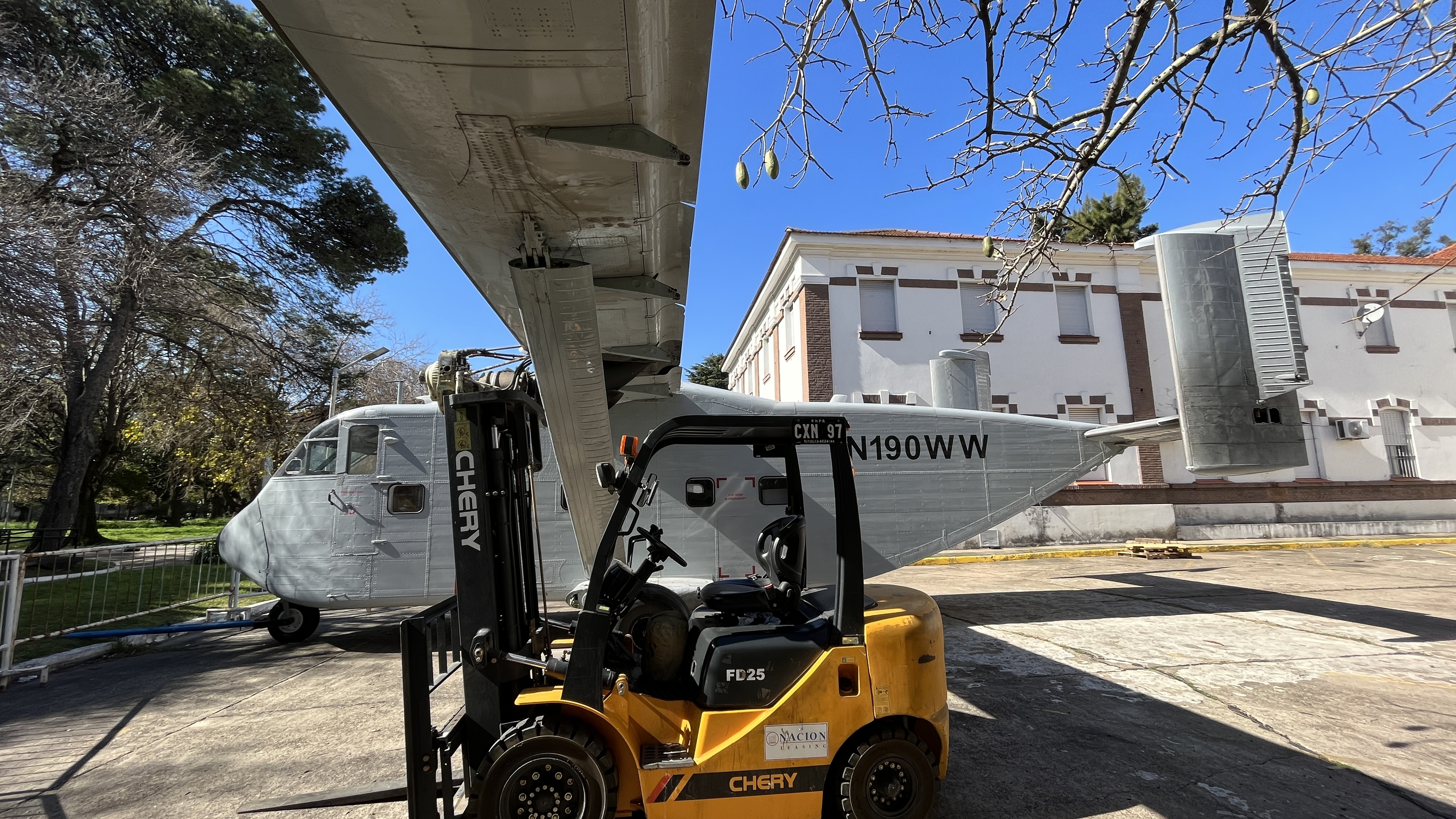
An airplane used for "death flights" during the Argentine military dictatorship

The ESMA, because it killed approximately 4,850 prisoners, used a plethora of methods to kill their victims. Many popular techniques did not require that the prisoners left the confines of the ESMA. Inside the basement, interrogation methods such as drowning and electrocuting were common and an easy way to kill. The ESMA officers, in other manners, found more unique ways to commit human rights violations that led to the deaths of many. For example, as seen in Nazi Germany and the Holocaust, these officers would attempt scientific experiments to show how well the human body could handle the loss of limbs, the removal of organs, and the fluctuation of hot and cold temperatures. Victims were also taken outside of the ESMA in the custody of those in charge to promote a sense of entertainment on the way to their murders. They would leave the prisoners in the middle of the jungle, supervising them as they unsuccessfully attempted to escape. Eventually, the guards would shoot them until they were dead.

The most cited killing method in the ESMA includes pushing the prisoners off moving planes. Officers would require the ESMA residents to take rides in these planes, only to push them off and watch them fall to their deaths. The victims were often still conscious, despite having been drugged. As a result, numerous bodies of victims washed up on beaches hundreds of kilometers south of Buenos Aires. Also known as death flights, this inhumane treatment contributed in a major way to the numerous deaths that came from this detention center. A portion of the Argentines that were kidnapped by the military did not even make it to the ESMA. Argentines would resist or try to evade their capture forcing the military to wound them in order to take them in. Those that did not survive the trip to the ESMA or could not be saved by the navy doctors, the bodies would be cremated and buried in the athletic field. Overall, the ESMA committed approximately one-sixth of the total murders during the eight-year period of the Dirty War.

=== Treatment of women in the ESMA ===
Women were subject to psychological torture and sexual abuse while being captive in ESMA. Part of the military's psychological torment and disciplining of women was to force them to adhere to beauty standards by giving them make-up, perfume, and wax. For later to be taken on fictional dates where they were later sexually assaulted by their "date" who in reality was a member of the military. ESMA was a place of constant sexual violence where not even pregnancy would spare women from being raped. Additionally, women who were pregnant were forced to give birth or abort their child in an unsafe and horrible medical environment. Children of the women who were forced to give birth were taken away and/or adopted by members of the military. It was common for women to return to ESMA after giving birth without even having the knowledge of what was the sex of their child or its whereabouts. Unlike men, during torture women were being sexually degraded and called slurs like "turra" which is Argentinian slang for whore.

==== Trials ====
A major trial, nicknamed "the ESMA mega-trial", of 63 people accused of crimes against humanity (lesa humanidad) during the 1976-1983 dictatorship, including those involved in death flights, was reaching its close in July 2015. 830 witnesses and 789 victims were heard. There had been two previous trials after the Supreme Court struck down an amnesty the military dictatorship had granted its members; in the first the one accused committed suicide before a verdict was reached; in a 2009 trial, twelve defendants were sentenced to life imprisonment. The trial was still in progress as of April 2016, and was being covered in a dedicated blog, Causa ESMA, with links to video reports of significant court sentences and similar events; many items are selected from the Argentine Infojus Noticias (National Agency of judicial news) Web site, Nacionales section.

Gonzalo "Chispa" Sánchez was extradited to Argentina and faced charges, as of 2020.

A federal court sentenced eight sailors and police officers and a civilian in the trial of crimes against humanity perpetrated during the military dictatorship at the ESMA on February 19, 2021. Among those convicted are former Navy officer Carlos Castellvi, police officer Raúl Cabral, and civilian Miguel Conde.

==== Military testimonies ====
Members of the military claim that they were simply obeying orders. It was also claimed that military members were made to believe they were fighting a war against enemies in civilian clothes. Military members never protested their orders despite being aware of the tortures and gruesome acts occurring in the ESMA because they were persuaded to believe that it was a supreme act that needed to be done for the sake of Argentina.

== Memorial Museum "Espacio Memoria y Derechos Humanos" (Former ESMA) ==
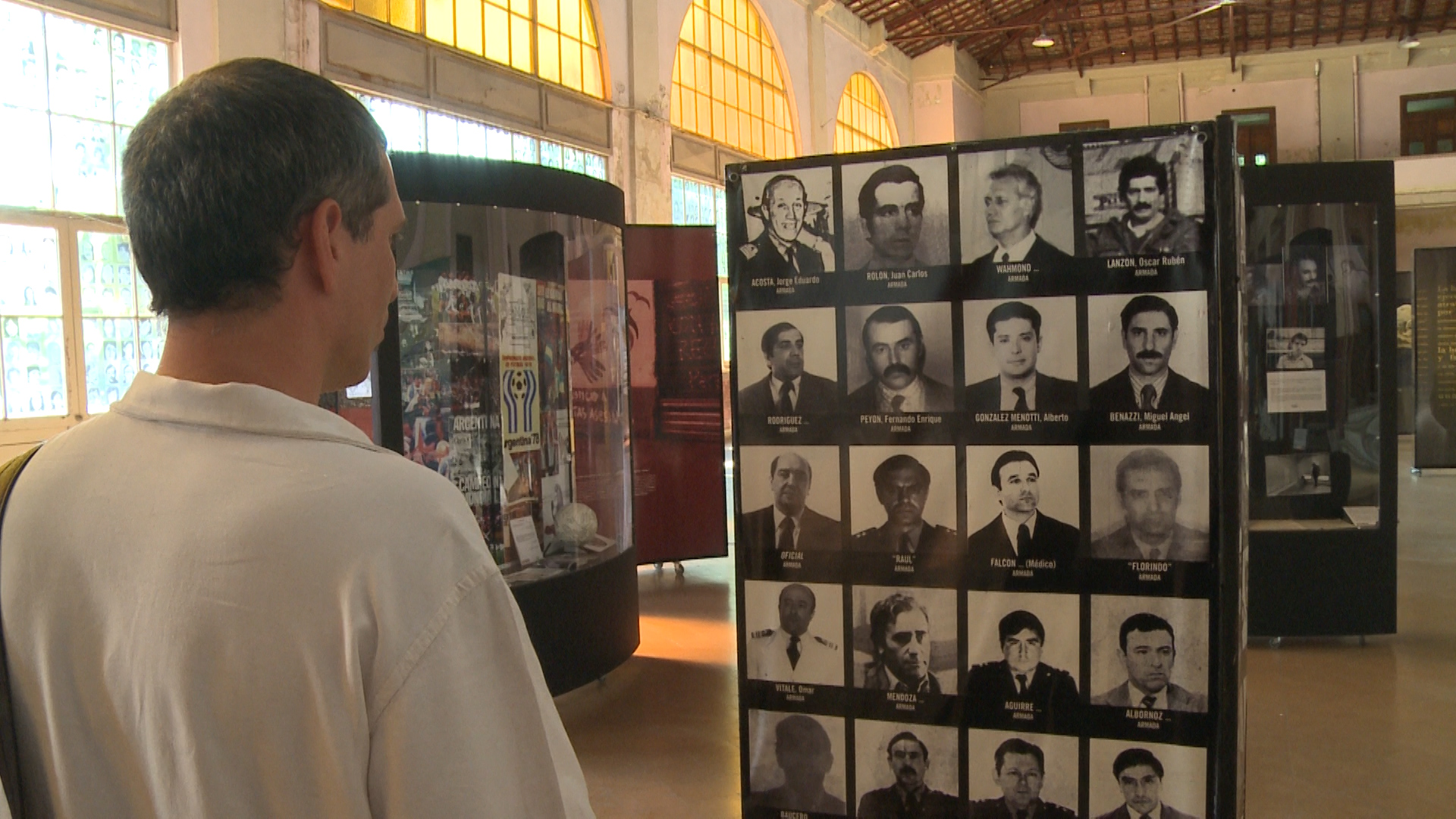
Inside view of the exhibits of the "Espacio Memoria y Derechos Humanos" which is the museum that ESMA was converted into

Since 2004 the original ESMA building has been used as a memorial museum to honor the memory of the disappeared. However, the mission of the memorial museum goes beyond that. ESMA will serve as a warning to assure that the gruesome acts of torture and other crimes done by the dictatorship will never occur ever again. Argentines feel obligated to use the museum to share the stories of those that lost their lives during the Dirty War and to show the horrors that occurred within the walls of ESMA.

== See also ==
- Pozo de Banfield
- Disappeared Detainees of the Dirty War
