= María Ponce de Bianco =

Argentine social activist

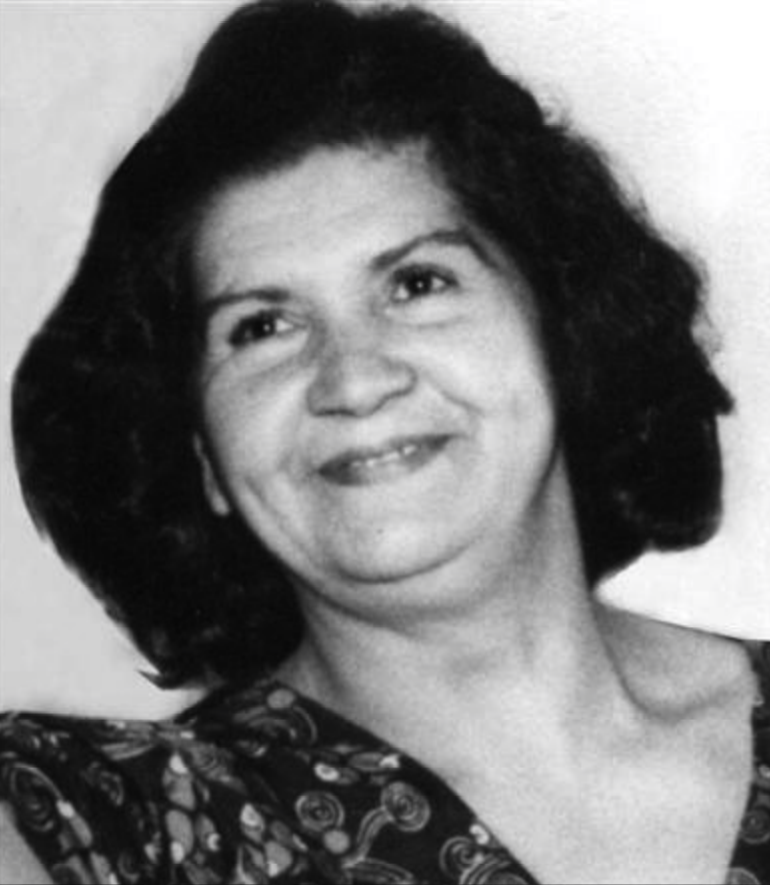
- Born: 6 July 1924; Tucumán, Argentina
- Died: 17 or 18 December 1977 (aged 53) near Santa Teresita by the Argentine Sea
- Cause of death: Dropped from a plane during one of the Death flights
- Occupation: Social activist
- Known for: Mothers of the Plaza de Mayo cofounder

María Eugenia Ponce de Bianco (6 July 1924 – 17 or 18 December 1977) was an Argentine social activist. She was one of the founders of the Mothers of the Plaza de Mayo, an organization which searched for desaparecidos (victims of forced disappearance during Argentina's Dirty War). She was kidnapped, tortured, and murdered as a result of her involvement with the group.

== Life ==
María Ponce was born in Tucumán, Argentina. From a young age, she expressed social concerns that led her to join the Communist Party of Argentina.

On 24 March 1976, there was a coup d'etat in Argentina that installed a new regime (the "National Reorganization Process") founded on state terrorism. At that time, Ponce left the Communist Party that had withheld aid regarding investigation of the disappearance of her daughter, Alicia, to start participating in the People's Revolutionary Army (ERP), collaborating with the relatives of desaparecidos and participating in the rounds in the Plaza de Mayo that led to the formation of the Mothers of the Plaza de Mayo.

== Disappearance, kidnapping, torture, and assassination ==
Between Thursday, 8 December and Saturday, 10 December 1977, GT 3.3.2 (Task Force 3.3.2), a state security organization under the command of Alfredo Astiz, kidnapped a group of 12 people linked to the Mothers of the Plaza de Mayo. (Note: The entire group abducted was composed of Azucena Villaflor de Vicenti, Esther Ballestrino de Careaga, María Ponce de Bianco (the three founders of the Mothers of the Plaza de Mayo), the nuns Alice Domon and Léonie Duquet, and the human rights activists Angela Auad, Remo Berardo, Horacio Elbert, José Julio Fondevilla, Eduardo Gabriel Horane, Raquel Bulit, and Patricia Oviedo.) Among them was María Ponce, along with the other founders of the Mothers of the Plaza de Mayo, Azucena Villaflor and Esther Ballestrino, and French nuns Alice Domon and Léonie Duquet.

Ponce and most of the group were kidnapped on 8 December in the Santa Cruz Church, located in the neighborhood of San Cristóbal of Buenos Aires, where they used to meet.

She was taken directly to the clandestine detention center located in the Navy Petty-Officers School (ESMA), under the control of the Argentine Navy, where she was imprisoned in the sector called "Capucha". She stayed there for approximately 10 days, during which she was constantly tortured.

Probably on 17 or 18 December 1977, Ponce and the rest of the group were transferred to the military airport at the southern end of the Aeroparque from the city of Buenos Aires, where they were sedated and boarded onto a Navy plane, and then thrown while alive into the sea off the coast of Santa Teresita, dying upon contact with the water.

== Identification of body and burial ==
On 20 December 1977, corpses from the sea began to appear on the beaches of Buenos Aires Province near the Santa Teresita and Mar del Tuyú spas. The police doctors who examined the bodies recorded that the cause of death had been "the clash against hard objects from a great height," as indicated by the type of bone fractures found, which occurred before death. Without further investigation, the local authorities immediately ordered the bodies to be buried as "NN" ("no name") in the cemetery of the nearby city General Lavalle.

In light of the National Commission on the Disappearance of Persons (CONADEP) investigation and the Trial of the Juntas in 1984, excavations were made in the General Lavalle cemetery, which revealed a large number of skeletal remains from the corpses on the beaches of San Bernardo and La Lucila del Mar. These remains were used in the trial of the Juntas and then stored in 16 bags.

From that point on, Judge Horacio Cattani began to collect lawsuits pertaining to these disappearances. Despite the Full stop law and the Law of Due Obedience, which paralyzed the investigations, in 1995 Cattani managed to assemble a file that required 40 square meters in which all the evidence would be housed.

In 2003, the mayor of General Lavalle reported that new "NN" graves had been located in the cemetery of the city. Judge Cattani then ordered new excavations with the Argentine Forensic Anthropology Team (EAAF), discovering two lines of tombs, one above the other. 8 skeletons were discovered — 5 corresponding to women, 2 corresponding to men, and one classified as GL-17, which was defined as "probably masculine".

On 24 July 2005, 28 years after being murdered, based on identification through forensic examination, María Ponce de Bianco was buried in the garden of the Santa Cruz Church in Buenos Aires next to Esther Ballestrino, one of the three mothers kidnapped with her. Subsequently, Sister Léonie Duquet and the activist Angela Auad were also buried there, and the ashes of Azucena Villaflor were scattered in the Plaza de Mayo.

== Knowledge and cover-up by the United States government ==
Secret government documents from the United States, declassified in 2002, prove that the US government knew as early as 1978 that the corpses of the French nuns Alice Domon and Léonie Duquet and those of "eleven other human rights activists" had been found on the beaches of Buenos Aires. This information was kept secret and was never communicated to the Argentine government.
