= Esther Ballestrino =

Paraguayan biochemist and political activist

Esther Ballestrino de Careaga
- Esther Ballestrino
- Born: 20 January 1918; Encarnación, Paraguay
- Died: 18 December 1977 (aged 59) near Santa Teresita by the Argentine Sea
- Cause of death: Murder by "death flight"
- Education: Biochemist
- Employer: Hickethier-Bachmann Laboratory (Buenos Aires)
- Known for: Political activism

Esther Ballestrino de Careaga (20 January 1918 – disappeared 17 or 18 December 1977) was a Paraguay biochemist and political activist. She is most notable for her connection to the future Pope Francis and her forced disappearance (abduction and murder) in Argentina by the military dictatorship of the National Reorganization Process (1976–1983). She had helped found Mothers of the Plaza de Mayo, which organised protests by the mothers of missing children taken by the authorities.

== Life ==
Ballestrino was born in Paraguay, where she obtained a doctorate in biochemistry at the University of Asunción. She became politically active as a member of the socialist February Revolutionary Party; she later founded and led the Women's Movement of Paraguay. Politics was dangerous under the military rule of Higinio Morínigo, and she had to leave the country in 1947. In Argentina, she married and had three daughters, Esther Careaga, Mabel Careaga, and Ana María Careaga. She worked in the food section at Hickethier-Bachmann Laboratory in Buenos Aires, where one of her subordinates was Jorge Mario Bergoglio, who would later become Pope Francis. He remembers working for her and her attention to detail. He later commented that Marxists could be good people, and he saw Ballestrino as a major influence on him. Ballestrino is said to be the first woman to be the boss of a future pope.

In 1976, two of Ballestrino's sons-in-law, Manuel Carlos Cuevas and Ives Domergue, were kidnapped and disappeared. Ballestrino was credited with helping found the Mothers of the Plaza de Mayo which organised the mothers of missing children protesting at the Plaza de Mayo. The next year, her pregnant daughter Ana Maria Careaga was also abducted in December 1977 by the authorities and tortured. Ballestrino contacted her associate, Jorge Mario Bergoglio, and asked that he come to give the last rites to a relative. The Catholic Bergoglio was surprised, as he knew that Ballestrino was a Marxist. When he arrived, he learned that Ballestrino's real intention was to have him smuggle out the family's collection of communist books. Ballestrino was worried that these books would lead to her arrest in the case of a house search. Bergoglio did as he was requested and smuggled out the books.

== Political activism in Paraguay ==
Bellestrino became politically active in Paraguay during the 1940s, joining the socialist Revolutionary Febrerista Party, then the Unión Democrática de Mujeres, a feminist group that mobilized against authoritarian rule. Her activism in Paraguay was directed against the military government under Higinio Moríngo, which targeted opposition movements and restricted political reforms.

Testimonial accounts from her daughter, Mabel, describe Ballestrino's commitment to collective struggle, emphasizing that she viewed the fight against dictatorship beyond her family to all of the disappeared victims of state violence. She worked to support families whose loved ones disappeared, framing her activism as ethical and political.

Ballestrino's organzing would eventually lead to persecution and forced into exile in Argentina. With this exile, her activism only expanded but situated herself within transnational networks that connected struggles against dictatorship and need for answers for the victims.

== Exile and activism in Argentina ==
After her exile from Paraguay, Ballestrino continued her political and feminist organizing in Argentina. She became one of the founding members of the Mothers of the Plaza de Mayo, formed in 1977 which demanded information about people who have disappeared under the military dictatorship. This movement transformed private grief into public protest by engaging in marches in Buenos Aires plazas as a symbolic act of resistance against state repression.

Ballestrino collaborated closely with other activists, such as Azucena Villa flor and María Ponce de Bianco, in drafting petitions and organizing marches, Together, the women sought to pressure the government to disclose the information of the disappeared and to hold those accountable for human rights violations.

== Influence on Pope Francis ==
While working at the Hickethier-Bachmann Clinical Laboratory, Ballestrino supervised and mentored the then-16-year-old Jorge Bergoglio, later known as Pope Francis. Accounts described her as an influential figure on his political and ethical thought. She introduced Bergoglio to Marxist ideas and encouraged him to reflect on justice and politics, and to speak for those who are oppressed or have no voice.

Her mentorship shaped Bergoglio's early vocation to help the poor and pursue social justice, instilling a moral framework that emphasized collective struggles and the defense of those without a voice. Her guidance connected her scientific background and political activism to broader ethical principles, which Bergoglio would later acknowledge influenced his reflections on leadership and social consciousness. Ballestrino's influence exemplify how feminist and Marxist activists contributed to ethical and religious thought in Argentina during the dictatorship.

== Abduction and murder ==
In December 1977, Ballestrino, along with Sisters Alice and Léonie and other Mothers of the Plaza de Mayo, prepared a request for the names of those who had disappeared and for the government to disclose their whereabouts. The reply was publicized in the newspaper La Nación on December 10, 1977. Navy Captain Alfredo Astiz had infiltrated the Mothers of the Plaza de Mayo, and the authorities moved against the ringleaders. Ballestrino and María Ponce de Bianco were seized by the security forces in the Church of Santa Cruz in downtown Buenos Aires.

The women were taken to a detention centre called The Navy Mechanics School (ESMA) by the Argentine security services, where they were tortured and then dropped into the sea from an aircraft whilst presumably still living, something referred to as a death flight.

Testimonial accounts from her daughters provide a timeline on their exile, Ballestrino's abduction, and the eventual confirmation for her death. The family's efforts to recover her remains and the details surrounding her death took about 30 years due to the help of the Argentine Forensic Anthropology Team, offering closure while underscoring the brutality of Argentina's state violence.

== Search for remains ==
On December 20, 1977, corpses were discovered near the bathing areas of Santa Teresita and Mar del Tuyú. Forensic investigations determined the cause of death to be "a crash against hard objects from great heights". This was concluded from the type of bone fractures that were sustained before death. Without further investigation, the bodies were placed in unmarked graves in the cemetery of the city of General Lavalle. They were to remain there for some time.

The National Commission on the Disappearance of Persons and the Trial of the Juntas led in 1984 to the exhumation of bodies in the General Lavalle cemetery. The investigations revealed bones that had belonged to the bodies found on the San Bernardo and La Lucila del Mar beaches. This evidence was used in the trial against the Juntas by Judge Horacio Cattani. It was not until 2003 that further information led to more exhumations by the Argentine Forensic Anthropology Team, which identified the eight bodies, including five women who had disappeared in 1977: Ballestrino, Azucena Villaflor, María Ponce de Bianco, Angela Auad, and Sister Léonie Duquet.

The enactment of Argentine laws known as the Ley de Punto Final and Ley de Obediencia Debida put an end to further investigation, as it was now assumed that those involved were following orders. Cattani had evidence that was described as "40 square meters" in 1995.

All the bodies were reburied in the garden of the Santa Cruz church. The remains of Sister Alice Domon were not found and remain missing.

== Knowledge by the United States government ==
Documents from the United States government, declassified in 2002, show that the American government knew in 1978 that the bodies of the French nuns Alice Domon and Léonie Duquet, and the Madres de Plaza de Mayo Azucena Villaflor, Esther Ballestrino, and María Ponce, had been found on the beaches of Buenos Aires Province. This secret was revealed in Document #1978-BUENOS-02346, prepared by the former U.S. Ambassador to Argentina, Raúl Castro, for the United States Secretary of State. It was dated March 30, 1978, and had the subject line "Report of a nun's death". The document reads:

1. A.F.P. March 28 story filed from Paris reports that the bodies of the two French nuns (Alicia Doman and Renée Duguet) (sic) who were abducted in mid-December with eleven other human rights activists were identified among corpses near Bahía Blanca.

2. Buenos Aires was filled with such rumors over a month ago based on accounts of the discovery of several cadavers beached by unusually strong winds along Atlantic Sea, points closer to the mouth of La Plata River some 300-350 miles to the north of Bahía Blanca.

3. (Name redacted), which has been trying to track down these rumors, has confidential information that the nuns were abducted by Argentine security agents and at some point were transferred to a prison located in the town of Junín, which is 150 miles west of Buenos Aires.

4. The Embassy also has confidential information through an Argentine government source (protected) that seven bodies were discovered some weeks ago on the beach near Mar del Plata. According to this source, the bodies were those of the two nuns and five mothers who disappeared between December 8 and December 10, 1977. Our source confirmed that these individuals were originally sequestered by members of the security forces acting under a broad mandate against terrorists and subversives. The source further states that few individuals in GOA were aware of this information.

5. The source has reported reliably in the past, and we have reason to believe he is reliable concerning disappearance questions.

== Legacy ==
In 2014, Pope Francis met with the husband of one of Ballestrino's daughters who had lived in exile in Sweden.
