= Africa Coast to Europe (cable system) =

Optical-fiber submarine cable system

ACE - Africa Coast to Europe
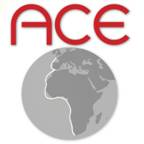
- Cable type: Submarine communications cable
- First traffic: December 15, 2012; 13 years ago
- Design capacity: 20 Tbit/s
- Area served: West African coast
- Website: www.ace-submarinecable.com

Africa Coast to Europe (ACE) is an optical-fiber submarine cable system serving 24 countries on the Europe, west coast and south Africa, managed by a consortium of 20 members.

The ACE cable connects more than 450 million people, either directly for coastal countries or through land links for landlocked countries such as Mali and Niger. ACE is also the first international submarine cable to land in Equatorial Guinea, Gambia, Guinea, Liberia, Mauritania, São Tomé and Príncipe and Sierra Leone.

Agreements are being put in place to allow the arrival of other operators in countries along the ACE cable route. Guinea-Bissau is the next country to be connected to the submarine cable.

ACE Consortium consists of telecommunications operators and member countries that have invested in the total 700 million dollars project, sometimes with the financial support of the World Bank. The consortium agreement was signed on 5 June 2010 and on 15 December 2012, this 17,000 km-long cable was put into service for the first time. The official inauguration ceremony was held in Banjul, Gambia, on 19 December 2012.

The 4 to 5 cm diameter cable runs at around 6,000 m below the sea level. The maximum capacity of the entire system is increased from 12.8 Tbit/s in the design to 20 Tbit/s.

It has been manufactured by Alcatel Submarine Networks (ASN) and laid by ships from ASN and Orange Marine.

== ACE consortium ==
The cable cost consortium members $700 million:

- ACE Gabon
- Bénin ACE GIE
- Cable Consortium of Liberia
- Canalink
- Dolphin Telecom
- Gambia Submarine Cable
- GUILAB SA
- International Mauritania Telecom
- MTN Global Connect
- Orange (France)
- Orange Cameroun
- Orange Côte d'Ivoire
- Orange Mali
- Orange Niger
- Gestor de Infraestructuras de Telecomunicaciones de Guinea Ecuatorial
- SCGB
- Sonatel
- STP Cabo

== Landing points ==
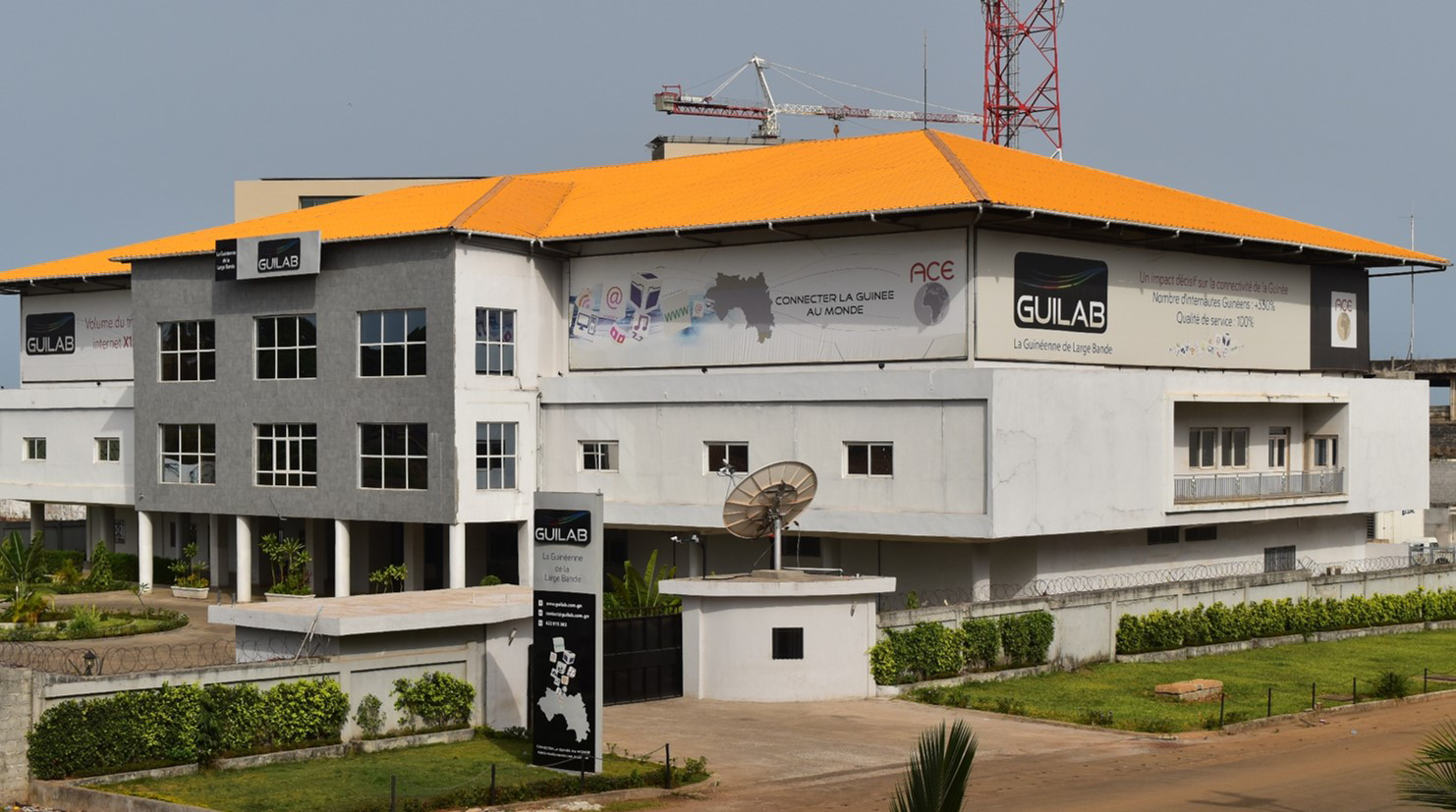
GUILAB landing station

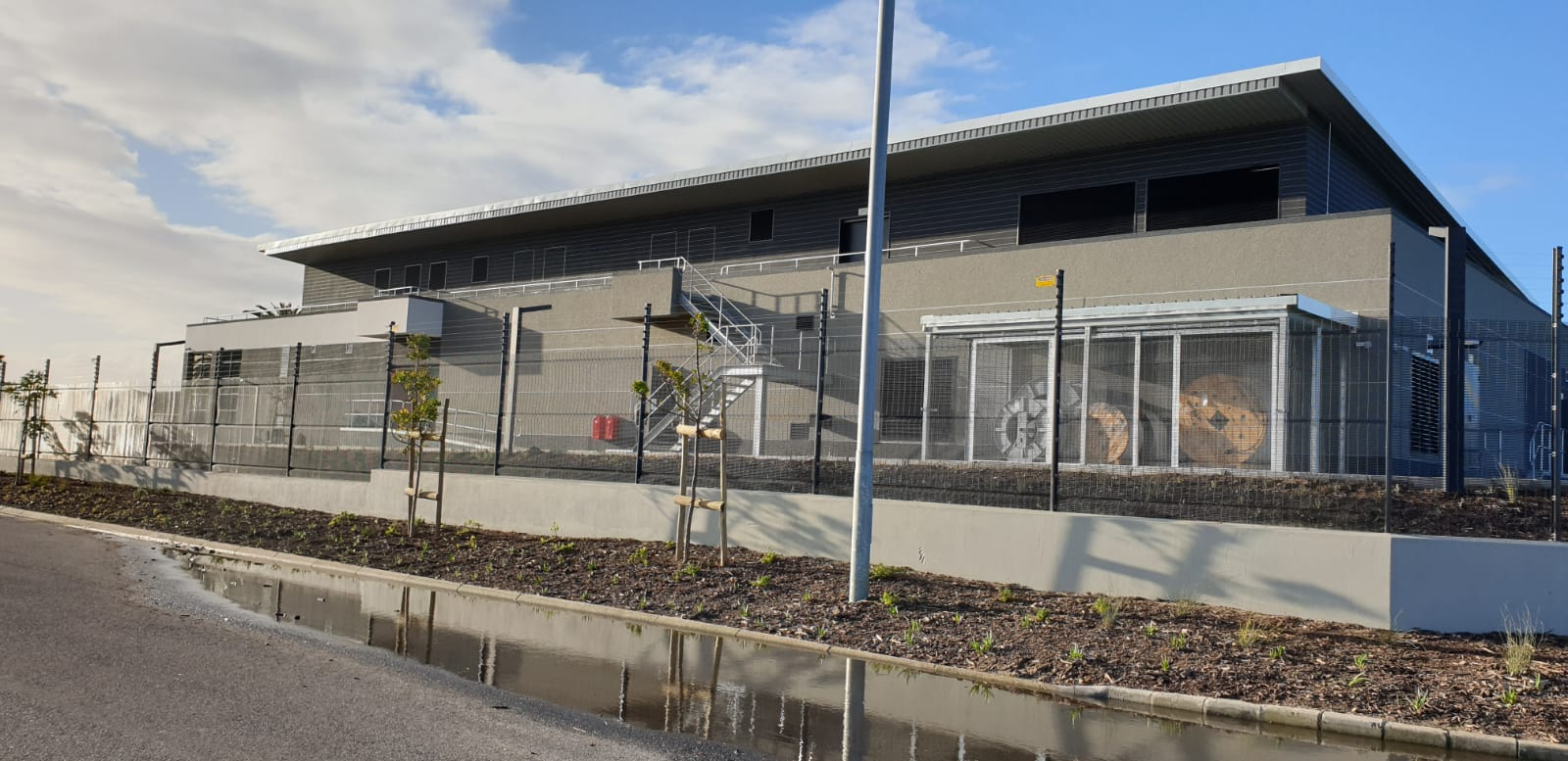
Africa Coast to Europe landing station in Duynefontein

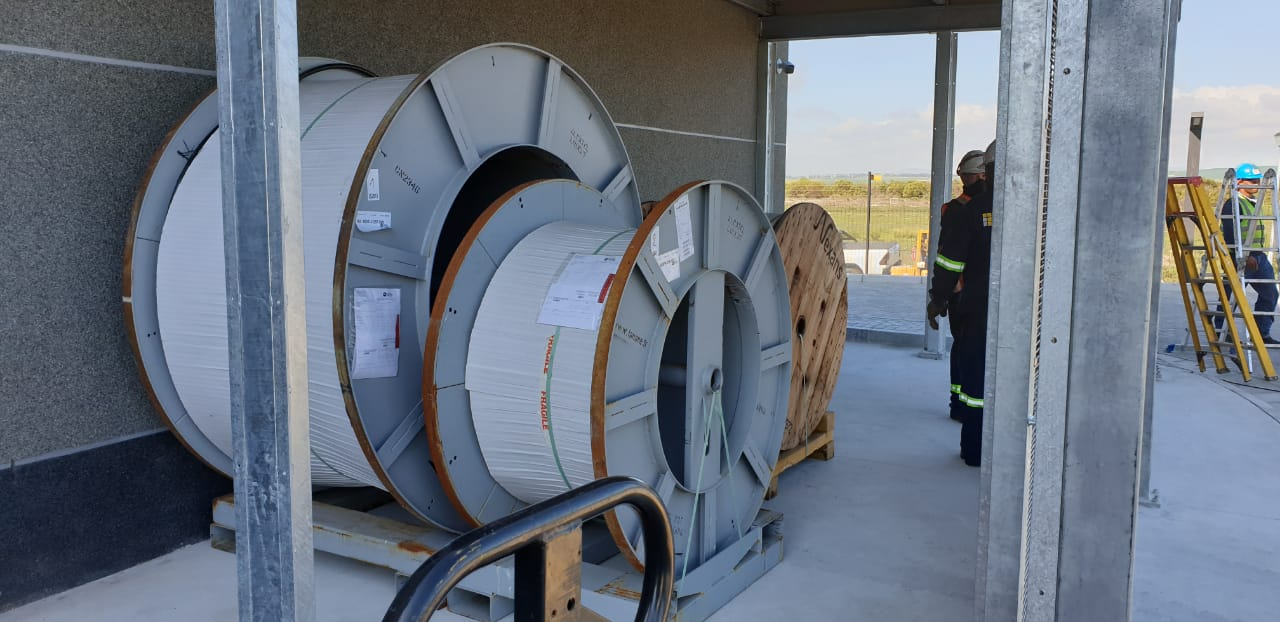
Africa Coast to Europe landing station in Duynefontein

Segment 1

- France, Penmarch
- Portugal, Carcavelos
- Espagne, île de Tenerife
- Mauritania, Nouakchott
- Senegal, Dakar

Segment 2

- Senegal, Dakar
- Gambia, Banjul
- Guinea-Bissau, Suro (coming up)
- Guinea, Conakry
- Sierra Leone, Freetown
- Liberia, Monrovia
- Ivory Coast, Abidjan

Segment 3

- Ivory Coast, Abidjan
- Ghana, Accra
- Benin, Cotonou
- Nigeria, Lagos
- Cameroon, Kribi
- Equatorial Guinea, Bata
- Gabon, Libreville
- Sao Tomé et principe, São Tomé

Segment 4 (The last segment is in service - 1 June 2021)

- South Africa

== Technical features ==
This 17 000-kilometers long cable is the only one connecting 24 west African and European countries. The ACE consortium members are organized according to a global access concept: multiple investors in one landing station. ACE marine routes have a low history of fault and a time-proof technology. The cable is able to adopt newer transponder technology.

Technical features are as below :

- PoP-to-PoP connection providing access to major cities in Europe and Africa (Paris, Lisbon, Cape Town)
- 100G technology proof
- Design capacity increased = 20 terabytes per second
- Lit capacity = 1.6 terabytes per second
- Initial capacity 200 Gbit/s on segment 1, 160 Gbit/s on segments 2 and 3
- Longest DLS = 4400 kilometres (Penmarch - Dakar)
- Low latency (express and omnibus fibres)
- Uses wavelength division multiplexing (the most advanced for submarine cables)

== Cable systems ==
Individual cable systems off the west coast of Africa include:

- ATLANTIS-2
- GLO-1
- Main One
- SAT-2
- SAT-3/WASC
- WACS

== See also ==
- List of international submarine communications cables
