= Mauricio Pertierra =

Argentine professional footballer

Personal information
- Full name: Mauricio Pertierra
- Date of birth: 14 March 2003 (age 23)
- Place of birth: San Clemente, Argentina
- Position: Midfielder

Team information
- Current team: Alvarado

Youth career
- El Porvenir (SC)
- 2020: Alvarado

Senior career*
Years	Team	Apps	(Gls)
2020–	Alvarado	2	(0)
- * Club domestic league appearances and goals as of 19:34, 6 January 2021 (UTC)

Mauricio Pertierra (born 14 March 2003) is an Argentine professional footballer who plays as a midfielder for Alvarado.

== Career ==
Pertierra joined Alvarado from El Gran Porvenir de San Clemente del Tuyú in early 2020, aged sixteen. He was promoted into Walter Coyette's first-team squad towards the back end of the year, initially featuring in friendlies; including against Círculo Deportivo on 7 November. After going unused on the bench for a 5–2 win away to Nueva Chicago in Primera B Nacional on 5 December, Pertierra was selected to start a home league defeat to Barracas Central on 19 December; aged seventeen.

== Career statistics ==
As of 6 January 2021.

Appearances and goals by club, season and competition
Club	Season	League			Cup		League Cup		Continental		Other		Total	
Club	Season	Division	Apps	Goals	Apps	Goals	Apps	Goals	Apps	Goals	Apps	Goals	Apps	Goals
Alvarado	2020	Primera B Nacional	2	0	0	0	—		—		0	0	2	0
Career total			2	0	0	0	—		—		0	0	2	0
