= Costa Chica =

Costa Chica may refer to:

- Costa Region, an area in the state of Oaxaca, Mexico
- Costa Chica of Guerrero, an area in the state of Guerrero, Mexico
- Costa Chica, Buenos Aires, a settlement in La Costa Partido department, Buenos Aires Province, Argentina
