= Atlantis-2 =

Trans-Atlantic telecommunications cable

ATLANTIS-2 (ATLANTIS II)
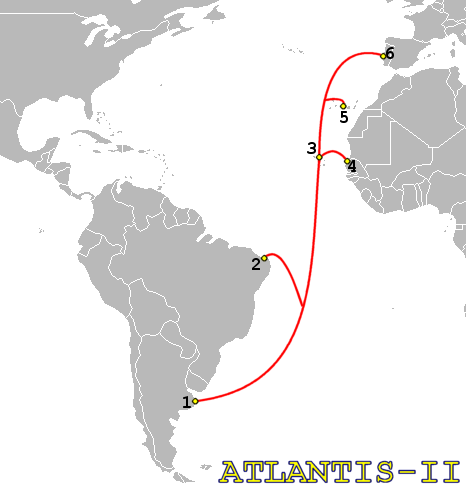
- Owners: Carrier consortium of 25 (including Telintar, Embratel, Sonatel, Cabo Verde Telecom, Telefónica, Marconi, Telecom Italia, France Telecom, Deutsche Telekom, Verizon)
- Landing points: 1. Las Toninas, Argentina; 2. Fortaleza, Brazil; 3. Praia, Cape Verde; 4. Dakar, Senegal; 5. El Médano, Canary Islands, Spain; 6. Sesimbra, Portugal
- Total length: 12,000 km
- Topology: Trunk and Branch
- Design capacity: 160 Gbit/s
- Currently lit capacity: 40 Gbit/s
- Technology: Fiber optics DWM
- Date of first use: May 10, 2000

ATLANTIS-2 is a fiber optic transatlantic telecommunications cable connecting Argentina, Brazil, Senegal, Cape Verde, Spain's Canary Islands and Portugal. It is the first submarine cable to link South America and the African continent.

The Atlantis 2 project total cost was US$370 million invest by a 25 international carrier consortium led technically and financially by Embratel with more than US$100 million of the investment.

Embratel, which organized the project, also installed two additional fiber pairs of 40 Gbit/s for its exclusive use between Fortaleza and Rio de Janeiro.

The cable was ready for service in February 2000 with a launch capacity of 40 Gbit/s. On May 10, to celebrate the definitive start-up of that operation, a videoconference between Fernando Henrique Cardoso (President of Brazil) and António Guterres (Prime Minister of Portugal) was held to demonstrate the new link.

It is approximately 12,000 kilometers in length. The cable was disconnected on 10 January 2022 due to a consortium decision, pending upgrades to 160 Gbit/s.

The landing points include:

1. Las Toninas, Argentina
2. Fortaleza, Brazil
3. Praia, Cape Verde
4. Dakar, Senegal
5. El Médano, Canary Islands, Spain
6. Lisbon, Portugal

== Sources ==
Pan, Hui (May 2000). "News Network" (PDF). Submarine Fiber Optics Communications Systems Monthly. Vol. 8, no. 5. Boston: Information Gatekeeper Inc. pp. 9–10. ISSN 1070-096X.

== See also ==
List of international submarine communications cables

Individual cable systems off the west coast of Africa include:

- ACE
- GLO-1
- Main One
- SAT-2
- SAT-3/WASC
- WACS
