= SAT-2 =

Submarine communications cable

SAT-2 was a submarine communications cable linking Melkbosstrand, South Africa, to El Medano, Tenerife Island, Spain and Funchal, Madeira islands, Portugal. It was 9,500 kilometres (5,900 mi) long, contained 82 repeaters, operated at 560 Mbit/s and was in service from 1993 to January, 2013. It was the first sub-Saharan cable, but it bypassed the African west coast.

It is the property of a consortium of fifteen operators including: Telkom SA Ltd, Telefónica, Marconi, British Telecom, France Cables et Radio, and Deutsche Telekom.

== See also ==
- List of international submarine communications cables

Individual cable systems off the west coast of Africa include:

- ACE
- ATLANTIS-2
- GLO-1
- Main One
- SAT-3/WASC
- WACS
- SACS
- Equiano
