= Mar del Tuyú =

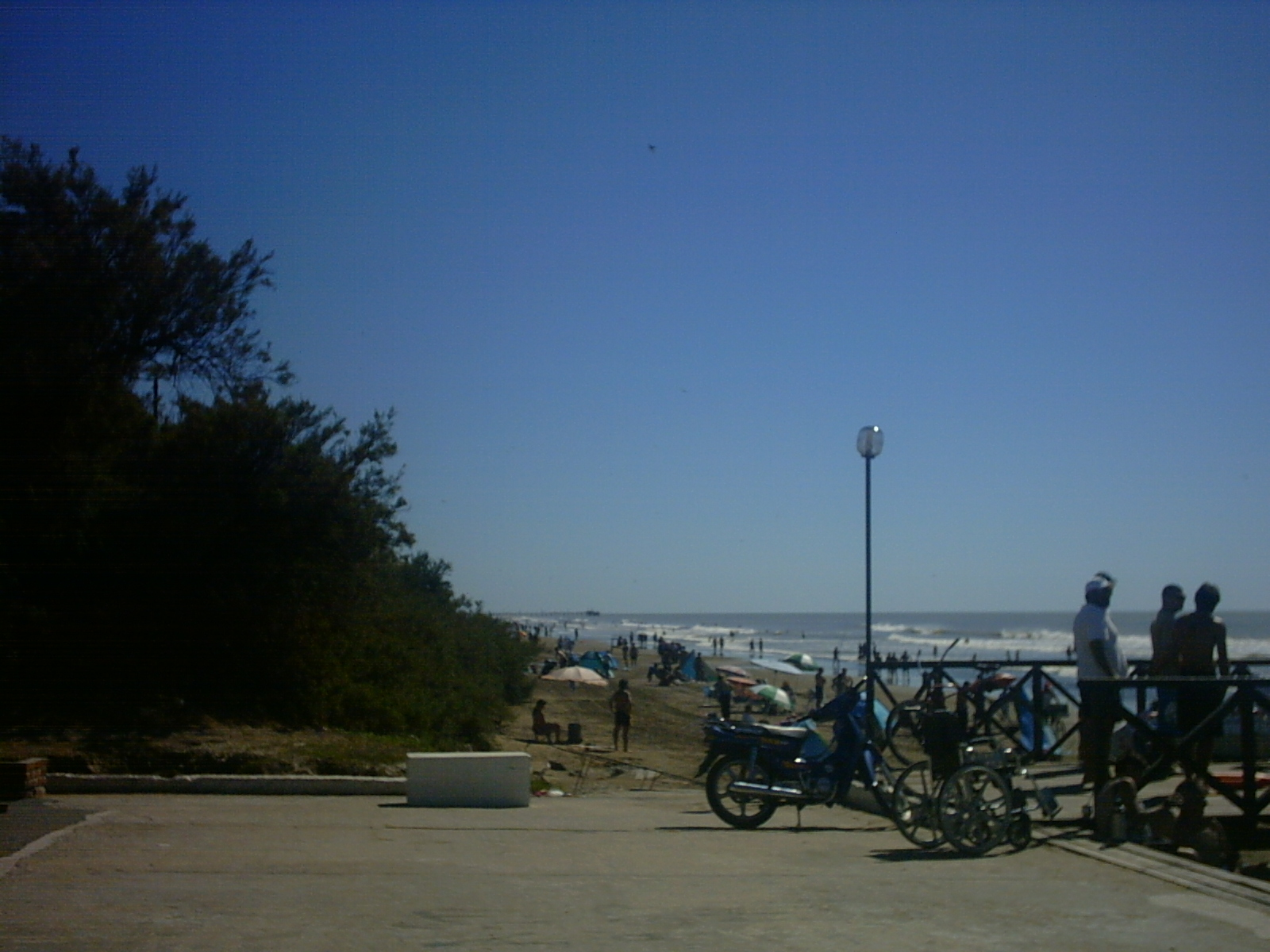
- Interactive map of Mar del Tuyú
- Coordinates: 36°32′S 56°40′W
- Country: Argentina
- Province: Buenos Aires
- Partido: La Costa
- Elevation: 1 m (3.3 ft)

Population (2001 census [INDEC])
  - Total: 6,916
- CPA Base: B 7108
- Area code: +54 2246

Mar del Tuyú is a resort town and administrative seat of La Costa Partido, on the Argentine Atlantic Coast, with access to Provincial Route 11.

== Overview ==
According to INDEC, the population of Mar del Tuyú was 6,916 in 2001, including (Costa del Este). It is included in a metropolitan area with Santa Teresita, raising the area's population to 19,950 inhabitants (INDEC, 2001).

The town was founded in 1945 by Arturo D'Elías. Upon the designation of the La Costa District in by the military-appointed Governor, Gen. Ibérico Saint Jean, in 1978, Mar del Tuyu was chosen as the county seat to avoid disputes between residents of the county's northernmost town, San Clemente del Tuyú, and the southernmost, Mar de Ajó (both of which are the largest in the district).

== Special Features of Mar del Tuyú ==
- The Ovals - One of the urban characteristics of Mar del Tuyú, that break the monotony of square blocks with occasional oval-shaped spaces. In these ovals, there are beautiful buildings, shopping malls, and the Municipal Palace, former site of the Gran Hotel Tuyú
- Fishing dock - 100 meters long and 4 meter wide, with a 10 by 20 meter point to fish from. It is made from wood, can float from 4 to 6 meters high, with street lighting, cabins for rent, and public bathrooms.
- Lighthouse - 25 meters high, with a light that can reach a distance of 36 kilometers. It is of high importance for coastal navigation, particularly for fishing boats.

== Town Festivals ==
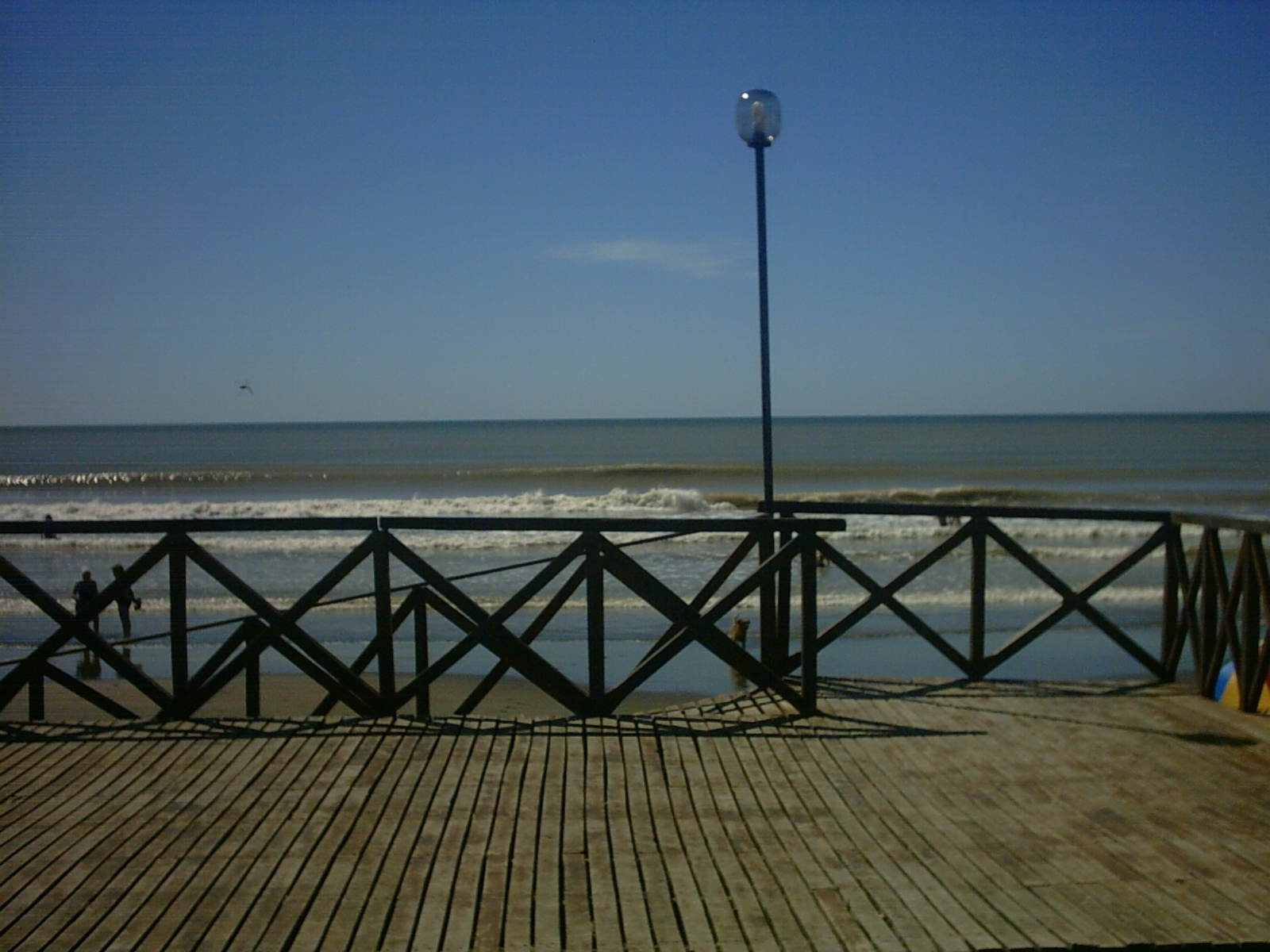
Boardwalk on the Mar del Tuyú beach

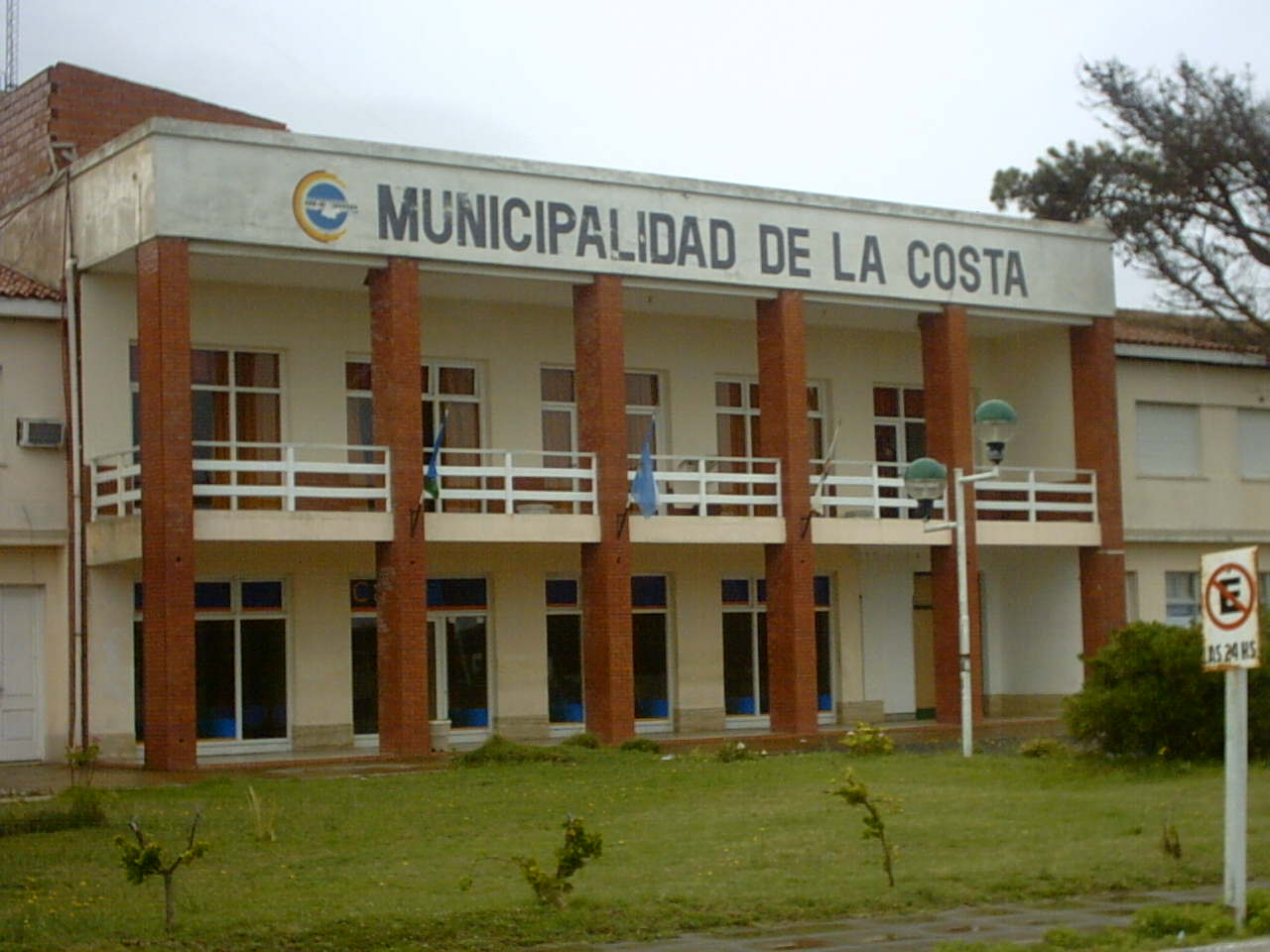
La Costa County Hall

- Nautical Provincial Festival of the Sea (Fiesta Provincial de la Náutica y el Mar) - Second weekend of November
- Stella Maris Patronage Festival (Fiesta Patronal Stella Maris) - February 2
