= Main One =

Submarine communications cable

- Owners: Main Street Technologies
- Key people: Funke Opeke
- Landing points: 1. Seixal, Portugal; 2. Lagos, Lagos State, Nigeria; 3. Accra, Ghana; 4. South Africa
- Total length: 14,000 km
- Topology: trunk and branch
- Design capacity: 1280 Gbit/s
- Currently lit capacity: n/a
- Technology: Fiber optics
- Date of first use: July 22, 2010; 16 years ago

The Main One Cable is a submarine communications cable stretching from Portugal to South Africa with landings along the route in various west African countries. On April 28, 2008, it was announced that Main Street Technologies has awarded a turnkey supply contract for the Main One Cable System to Tyco Telecommunications.

The cable system spans 14,000 km and provides additional capacity for international and Internet connectivity to countries between Portugal and South Africa on the west coast of Africa. The submarine cable project was designed in two phases, both of which were scheduled for completion in May 2010. The dual fiber pair, 1.28-Tbit/s, DWDM project connects Nigeria, Ghana, and Portugal in Phase 1 with onward connectivity through Portugal to Europe, Asia and the Americas. The Phase 1 cable system spans 6,900 kilometres. Additional connectivity extending to Angola and South Africa occurred in the second phase of the project.

Main One provides international capacity into a region that has experienced explosive growth in tele-density in recent years, but which remains constrained with respect to access to international cable capacity for global connectivity. The system is being developed by Main Street Technologies headquartered in Lagos. An October 10, 2008 press release states that the desk top study and engineering for the system has been completed. On July 22, 2010, the cable was launched. MainOne also owns a data centre subsidiary, MDXi which builds and operates Tier III data centres across West Africa.

Project management and engineering for the cable system has been contracted to specialist undersea consulting firm, Pioneer Consulting.

The Chief Executive Officer of Main One is Funke Opeke.

== Path ==
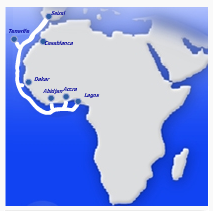
Main One - phase 1

The Main One Cable is an undersea cable system stretching from Portugal to South Africa with landings along the route in various west African countries.

== Landing points ==
The Main One cable system has the following landing points in operation in July 2010:

- Seixal, Portugal
- Accra, Ghana
- Lagos, Lagos State, Nigeria

planned landing points for phase 2 are:

- Casablanca, Morocco
- Tenerife, Canary Islands
- Dakar, Senegal
- Abidjan, Côte d'Ivoire
- Bonny, Nigeria
- Libreville, Gabon
- Boma, Democratic Republic of the Congo
- Luanda, Angola
- Cape Town, South Africa
- Swakopmund, Namibia

== Impact ==
Main One provides international capacity into a region that has experienced explosive growth in tele-density in recent years, but which remains constrained with respect to access to international cable capacity for global connectivity.

The Main One Cable system provides open access to regional telecom operators and Internet service providers at rates that are less than 20% of current international bandwidth prices in the region available via SAT3 or satellite service providers, according to the project's organizers. Main Street says it will encourage local content development via skills transfer of critical networking technologies and job creation with the location of the network operational center (NOC) for the entire system in Nigeria.

== Ownership ==
The cable is privately owned by Main Street Technologies, international investors like the Africa Finance Corporation and the Pan-African Infrastructure Development Fund (PAIDF) and a couple of Nigerian banks.

== Construction time-line ==
On April 28, 2008, it was announced that Main Street Technologies had awarded a turnkey supply contract for the Main One Cable System to Tyco Telecommunications. An October 10, 2008 press release states that the desk top study and engineering for the system had been completed. On July 1, 2010, press release states that Main One had been completed and commissioned. The cable went live on July 22, 2010.

== See also ==
- List of international submarine communications cables

Individual cable systems off the west coast of Africa include:

- ACE
- ATLANTIS-2
- GLO-1
- SAT-2
- SAT-3/WASC
- WACS

== Sources ==
- "Main One Web Site"
- "Press Release, Tyco awarded Main One cable contract, April 28, 2008"
- "Press Release, Main One Cable System progressing on schedule, October 10, 2008"
- "Main One - Work begins on N5.4b sub-marine optical fibre cable Saturday, February 09, 2008"
- "Nigerian Muse, Competition rocks bandwidth costs via gateways, submarine cable"
- "Pioneer Consulting awarded MainOne contract", Ghana Business News"
