= GLO-1 =

The GLO-1 (Globacom-1) submarine communications cable is a cable system along the west coast of Africa between Nigeria and the UK, owned by Nigerian telecoms operator Globacom.

The submarine cable system is 9,800 km long, and became operational in 2011 with a minimum capacity of 640 Gbit/s.

A project of Globacom, Nigeria's 2nd largest telecoms provider, total capacity of the system is now advertised as 2.5 Tbit/s. The cable's link To Ghana was turned up in April, 2011.

== Landing points ==
The main cable landing points are:

- Lagos, Lagos State, Nigeria.
- Accra, Ghana
- Dakar, Senegal
- Nouakchott, Mauritania
- Casablanca, Morocco
- Sesimbra, Portugal
- Vigo, Spain
- Bude, UK

== Security breach ==
In February 2018, The Sunday Times reported that the infrastructure for the UK landing site of the Apollo, GLO-1 and Europe India Gateway cables had been found almost entirely unprotected. Their reporter was able to reach the premises without being challenged, and found the door to the generator room unlocked and left ajar. Vodafone, who manage the facility, said that he had not reached critical equipment and "would not have been able to interrupt the operation of the facility."

== See also ==
List of international submarine communications cables

Individual cable systems off the west coast of Africa include:

- ACE
- Atlantis-2
- Main One
- SAT-2 (cable system)
- SAT-3/WASC
- WACS
