= Ikatel =

Malian telecommunications company

Ikatel was a telecommunications company of Mali, affiliated with France Telecom (now known as Orange SA). Since 2003 it has been Mali's second mobile phone operator. Since November 30, 2006 Ikatel became Orange Mali Faso djigui.
