= La Costa Partido =

Administrative region in Argentina

La Costa Partido de la Costa
- Department
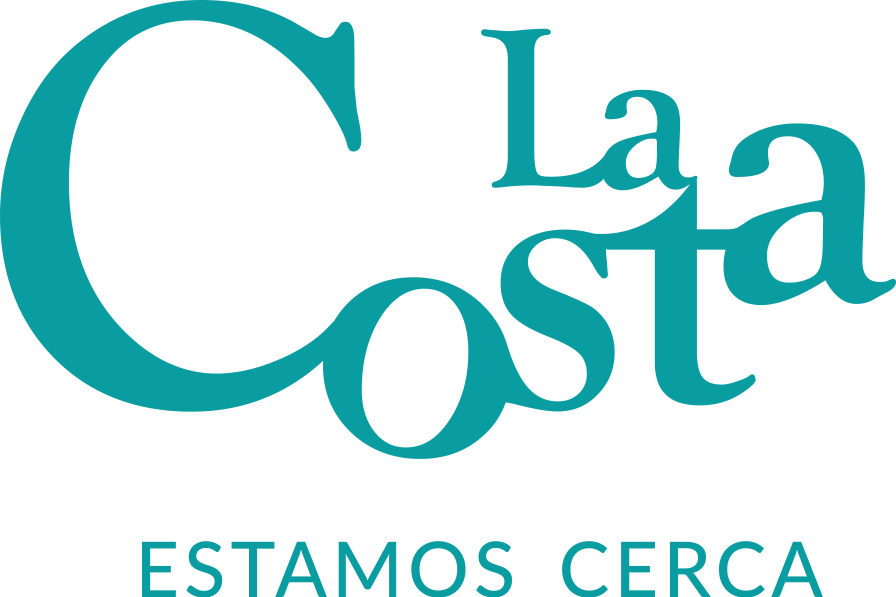
- Logo

- location of Partido de la Costa in Buenos Aires Province
- Coordinates: 36°34′S 56°41′W
- Country: Argentina
- Established: 1978
- Seat: Mar del Tuyú

Government
  - Intendant: Juan Pablo de Jesus (PJ)

Area
  - Total: 225 km^{2} (87 sq mi)

Population
  - Total: 102,836 (2,022)
  - Density: 457/km^{2} (1,180/sq mi)
- Postal Code: B7105, B7106, B7107, B7108, B7109, B7111, B7112, B7113
- IFAM: BUE064
- Area Code: 02252, 02246, 02257
- Website: lacosta.gob.ar

Partido de la Costa is a partido on the Atlantic Coast of Buenos Aires Province in Argentina.

== Overview ==
The provincial subdivision has a population of about 102,836 inhabitants in an area of 225 km^{2} (87 sq mi), and its capital city is Mar del Tuyú, which is 350 km (217 mi) from Buenos Aires.

The economy of Partido de la Costa is dominated by the summer tourist season (December–February), which sees tens of thousands of vacationers make their way to the Atlantic coast from Buenos Aires and the Greater Buenos Aires urban area.

== History ==
Noticed by Ferdinand Magellan in 1520, who gave nearby Cape San Antonio its name, Spanish authorities first surveyed the area in 1580. The waterfront area was purchased in the 18th century by the Ortiz de Rozas family, one of Argentina's most well-established landowners. Sold to another prominent family, the Leloirs, in 1816, the area became a sheep ranch. A descendant of the Ortiz de Rozas', Buenos Aires Province Governor Juan Manuel de Rosas, designated the area as the Partido del Rincón de Ajó in 1839, following a local insurrection against his repressive rule and poor conditions. A fishing wharf became Ajó's economic hub in subsequent decades, and had been prominent as a supply route during the 1838 French blockade against Rosas. The area was renamed Partido de General Lavalle, after one of Rosas' erstwhile foes, in 1891. The installation of abattoirs (since closed) was followed by new fishermen's docks, a canal, a Buenos Aires Great Southern Railway terminal, and two lighthouses built between 1878 and 1902.

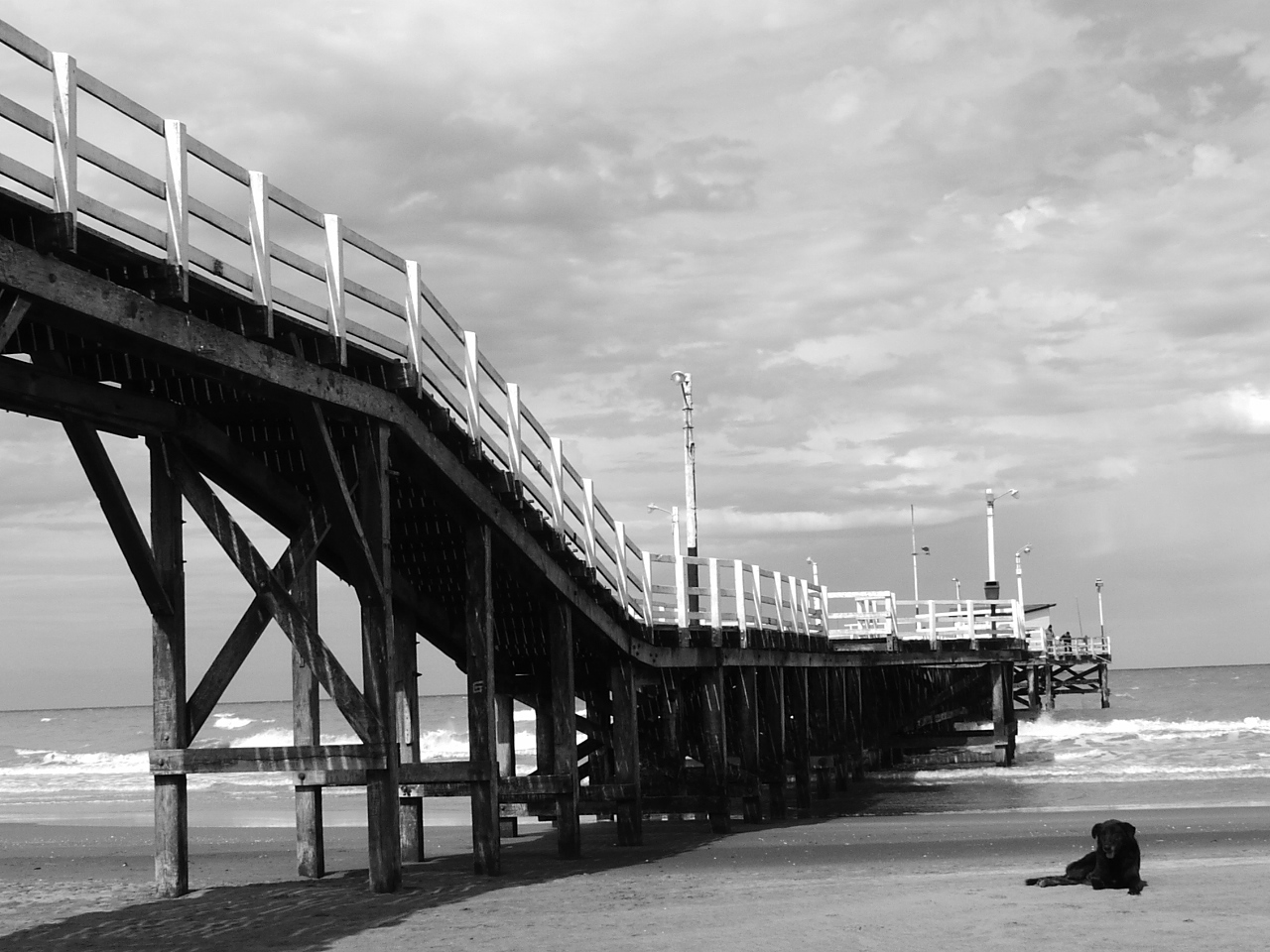
The La Lucila del Mar pier, one of five in the county.

The area became a tourist attraction during the 1920s, when County Mayor Jorge Gibson promoted its shores for their seclusion and scenic value. He had the local coastline graded into public beaches, and in 1932, a provincial gravel road reached the area. The oldest official municipalities, San Clemente del Tuyú and Mar de Ajó, were established in 1935, followed by San Bernardo del Tuyú (1942), Mar del Tuyú (1945), and Santa Teresita (1946).

During the last dictatorship, the military-appointed Governor, General Ibérico Saint Jean, signed Decree 9024, the Urban Jurisdictions Law of June 11, 1978, by which the Lavalle District was divided into three (the others being Pinamar and Villa Gesell). Mar del Tuyú was chosen as the county seat to avoid disputes between residents of the county's northernmost town, San Clemente del Tuyú, and the southernmost, Mar de Ajó, which are the two largest in the district.

Elections in 1983 brought Justicialist candidate Juan de Jesús to office. His administration two hospitals built and numerous public infrastructure works, thereby helping integrate the neighboring communities in the district. The economic malaise Argentina suffered in the 1980s and the boom in overseas travel following recovery in the early 1990s took its toll on municipal finances, however. The administration of Mayor Guillermo Magadán (who had been the military-appointed mayor in the late 1970s) had a nature theme park, Parque Bahía Aventura, opened in 1997. Drawing few crowds, the area was slated for closure when, in 2003, mineral hot springs were discovered at the spot. Returned to office that year, Mayor de Jesús set aside part of Bahía Aventura and opened Termas Marinas, today one of Argentina's most popular hot springs; his son, Juan Pablo, was elected mayor in 2007. The county's population has grown by over 4% a year since 1980, climbing from under 26,000 that year, to over 60,000 at the 2001 census [INDEC].

- La Costa: Cronología

== Settlements ==
- San Clemente del Tuyú
- Las Toninas
- Costa Chica
- Santa Teresita
- Mar del Tuyú
- Costa del Este
- Aguas Verdes
- La Lucila del Mar
- Costa Azul
- San Bernardo del Tuyú
- Mar de Ajó
- Nueva Atlantis
- Pinar del Sol
- Costa Esmeralda
- Villarobles
- North Beach

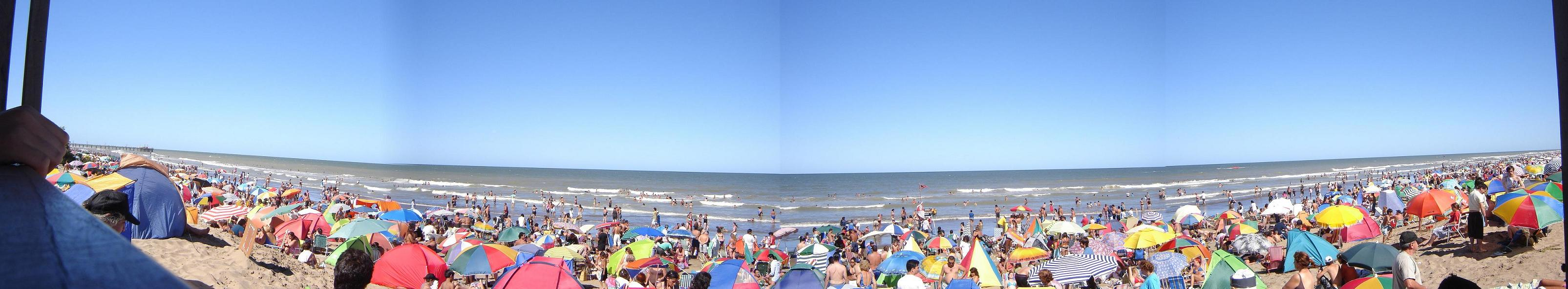
Beachgoers in Santa Teresita
