= Las Toninas =

Town in La Costa Partido of the Province of Buenos Aires, Argentina

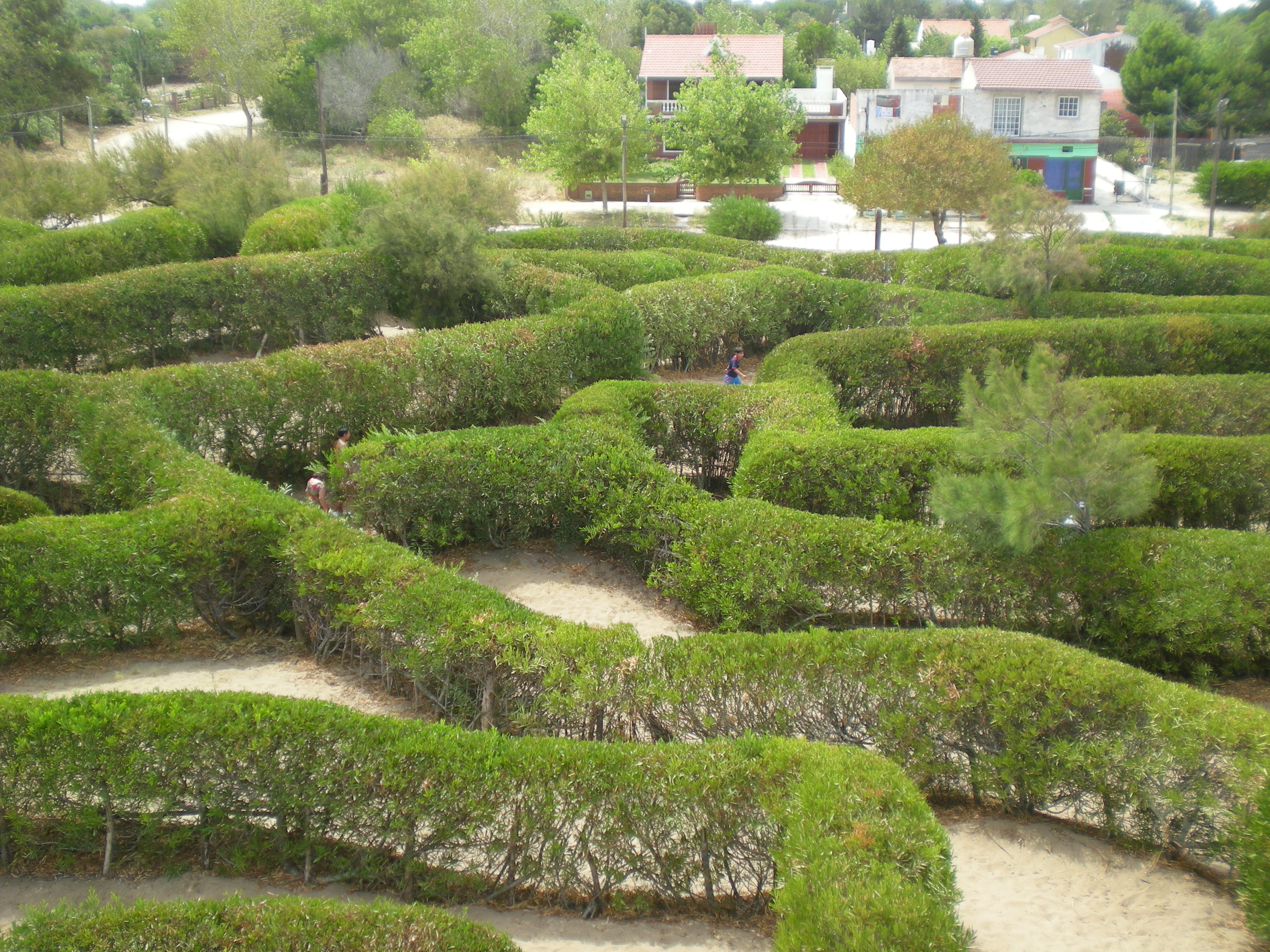
- Las Toninas Maze

- Location in Buenos Aires Province Las Toninas (Argentina)
- Coordinates: 36°29′S 56°42′W
- Country: Argentina
- Province: Buenos Aires
- Partido: La Costa
- Established: 1960
- Elevation: 17 m (56 ft)

Population (2001 census [INDEC])
  - Total: 3,550
- CPA Base: B 7106
- Area code: +54 2246
- Website: http://lacosta.gob.ar/lugares_interes?localidad=5496

Las Toninas is a resort town of the Atlantic Coast in the La Costa Partido of the Province of Buenos Aires, Argentina.

== Overview ==
Founded in 1960, Las Toninas was christened in honor of the Commerson's dolphin (known locally as a tonina). The shore had been the site of a shipwreck in 1883 of a commercial vessel registered in the British Empire, whose captain settled nearby and established the Estancia Los Ingleses.

The shore at Las Toninas is distinguishable from its sister communities' by the extensive growth of tamarix bushes. These were used to create a hedge maze as a tourist attraction, and the 6,400 m^{2} (16,000 ft^{2}) maze is touted locally as the nation's largest.

Las Toninas is also known as the "Fiber Optical Capital" in Argentina; because it is the single point where submarine optical fiber networks reach Argentina via several landing cable stations, by companies such as Level 3 (with its SAC ring), TIWS (Atlantis 2), Telecom-Antel (Bicentenario cable system), and Telefónica (SAM 1). The town was chosen because its coastline was not as rocky as others in the region.
