= Mar de Ajó =

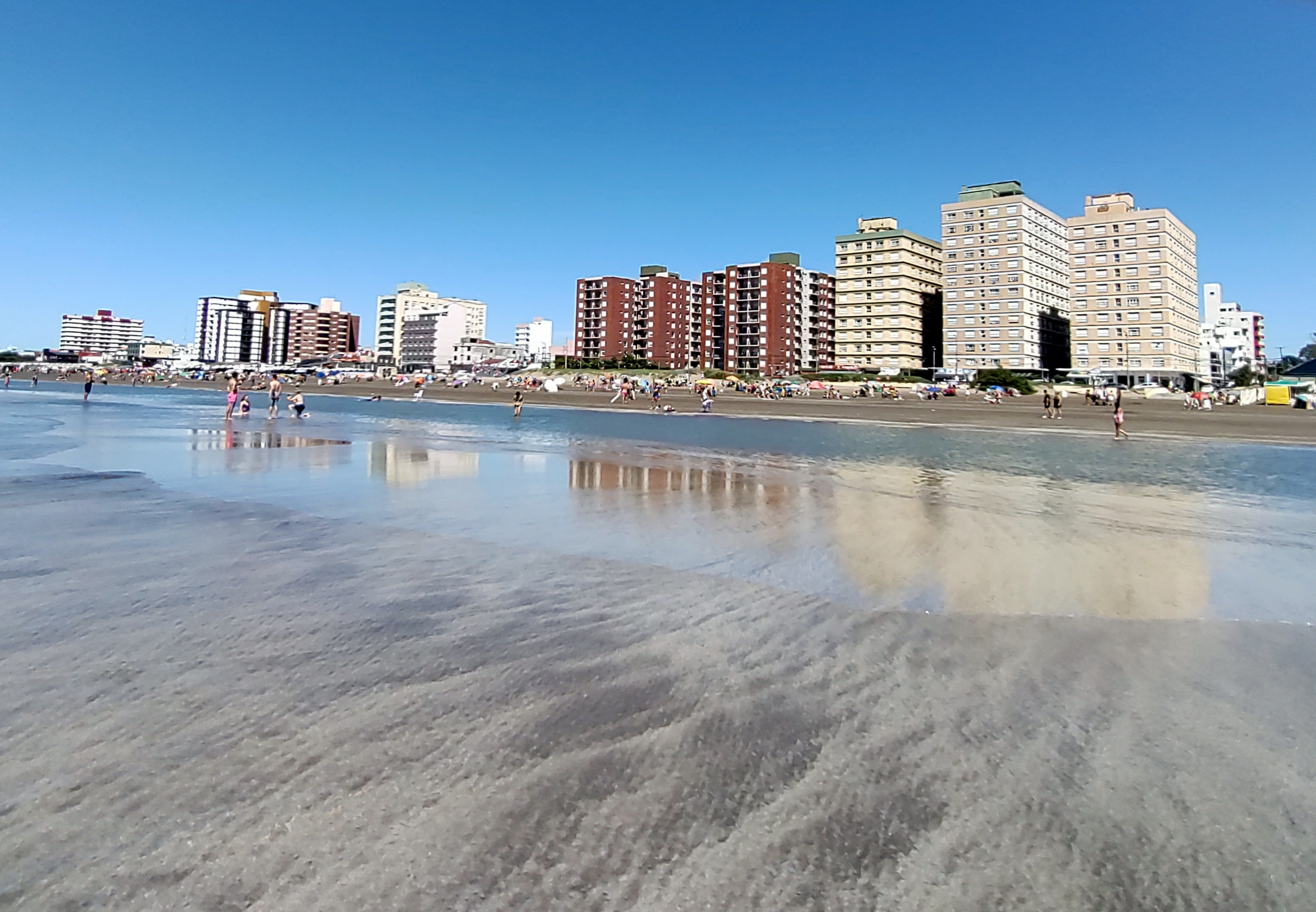
- Mar de Ajó, Argentina

- Location in Buenos Aires Province Mar de Ajó (Argentina)
- Coordinates: 36°43′13″S 56°41′16″W
- Country: Argentina
- Province: Buenos Aires
- Partido: La Costa
- Established: December 21, 1935
- Elevation: 6 m (20 ft)

Population (2020 census [INDEC])
  - Total: 25,520
- CPA Base: B 7109
- Area code: +54 2257
- Climate: Cfb

Mar de Ajó is a resort city of Atlantic Coast located in the southern end of La Costa Partido in Buenos Aires Province, Argentina. The region is known as the Tuju Corner (Rincón del Tuyú).

== Etymology ==
It owes its name to a word used by the Guarani aborigines who inhabited the area, whose meaning is Soft Mud. During the arrival in 1580 of the Paraguayan Hernando Arias de Saavedra to the shores of the mouth of the Río de la Plata with the Atlantic Ocean, his expedition made use of the collaboration of a group of evangelized Guarani indigenous people, who identified this area with the word Tuju, a term in Guarani that indicated the presence of white mud on the coasts and bottom of the river, for this reason, this place ended up being known as the Rincón del Tuyú. There's the Ria Ajó, which was identified by the Guarani with the term Ajo, which alluded to the soft white mud of its bed, which made the terrain unstable when it came to traversing it on foot. For this reason, the estuary began to be known as Ría Ajó by the Spanish.

== History and overview ==
Named for the original Partido de Ajó district established by Governor Juan Manuel de Rosas in 1839, the fishing village became of interest to tourism during the 1920s, when district Mayor Jorge Gibson graded the area's beaches. The town was officially established on December 21, 1935, and in 1936, its pier was completed; measuring 270 m (886 ft), the Mar de Ajó Pier is the largest of the five in the La Costa District. Mar de Ajó grew to become the most populous of the thirteen La Costa District municipalities, and rivals San Clemente del Tuyú, the northernmost La Costa town, in tourist activity.

Renewed growth in the 1990s led to the establishment of the Universidad Atlántida Argentina in 1994, and a casino in 1996. Other notable installations include the Rubén Luis Di Palma Regional Racetrack (among the venues of the TC2000 rally), the Historical Museum and Archives (featuring glyptodons and other cenozoic era fossils), the Parish of Santa Margarita María de Alacoque, and the ship graveyard at Nueva Atlantis – site of the shipwreck of numerous 19th-century merchant vessels, notably the Margaretha, an Imperial German ship that ran aground in 1880, and whose remains appear during low tide.

The town has a permanent population of 25,520 inhabitants and an area of approximately 35 square kilometers.

== Notable personalities ==
- Norberto Gomez Barroche, Argentine professional footballer.

== Gallery ==
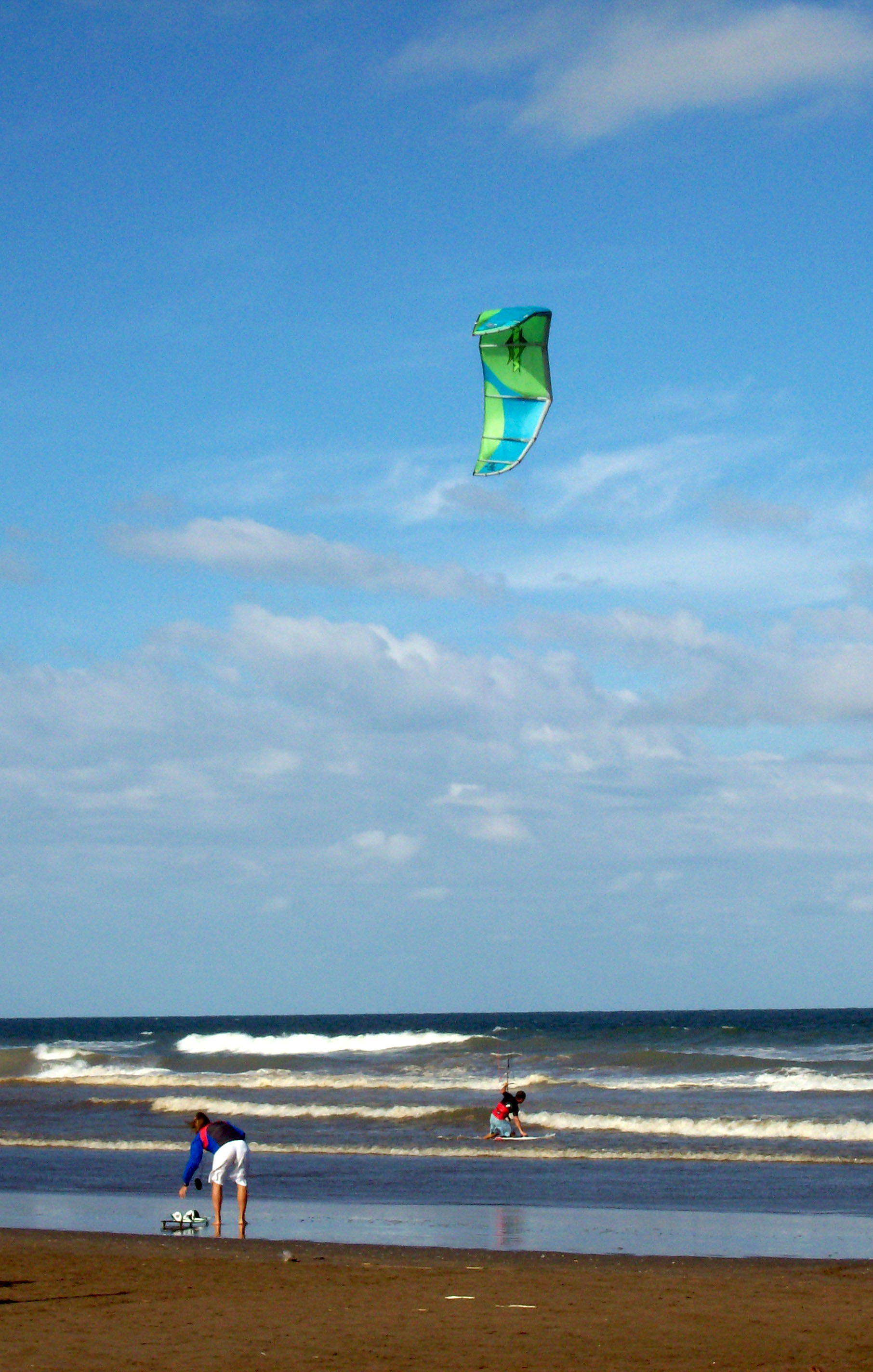
Kite surfing in Mar de Ajó, Argentina

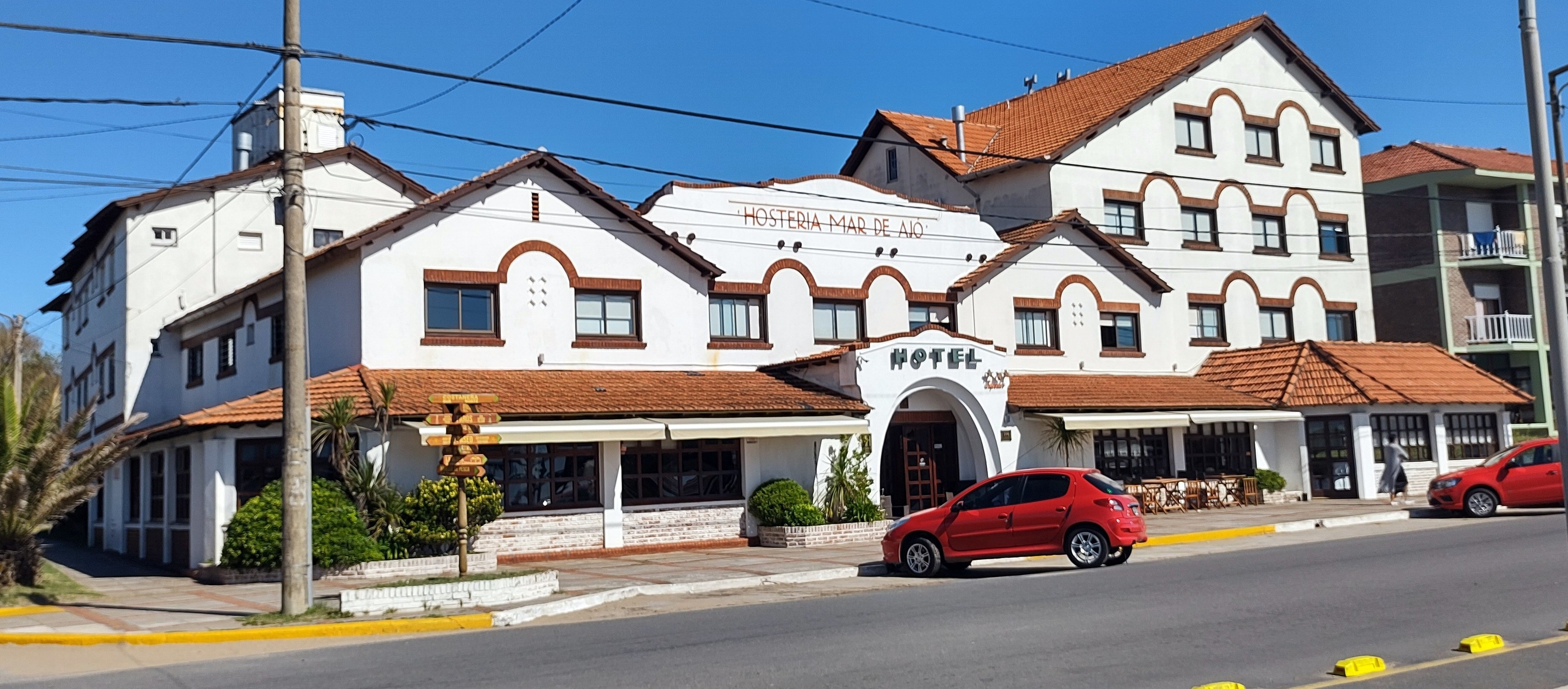
Mar de Ajó, Argentina

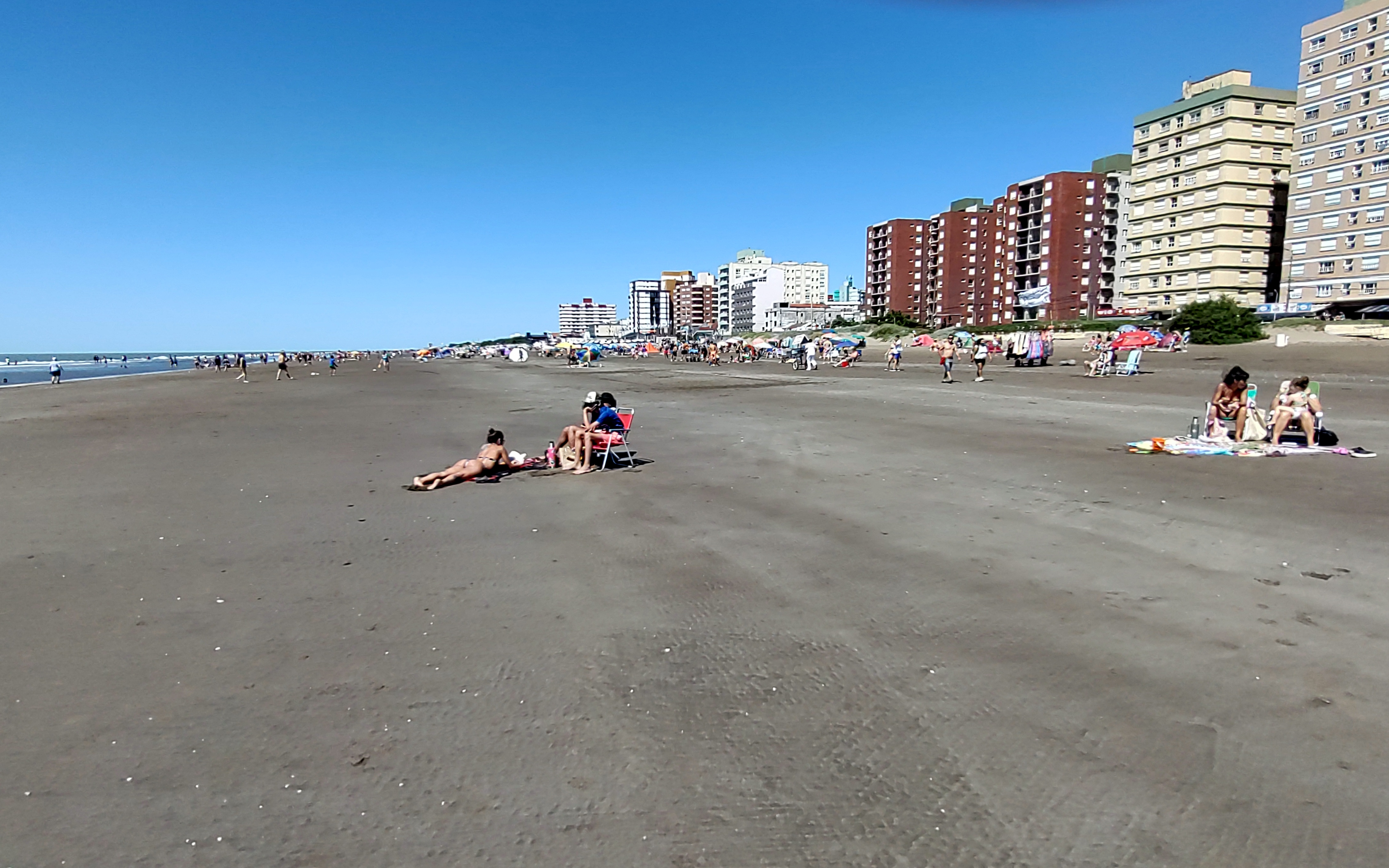
Mar de Ajó, Argentina

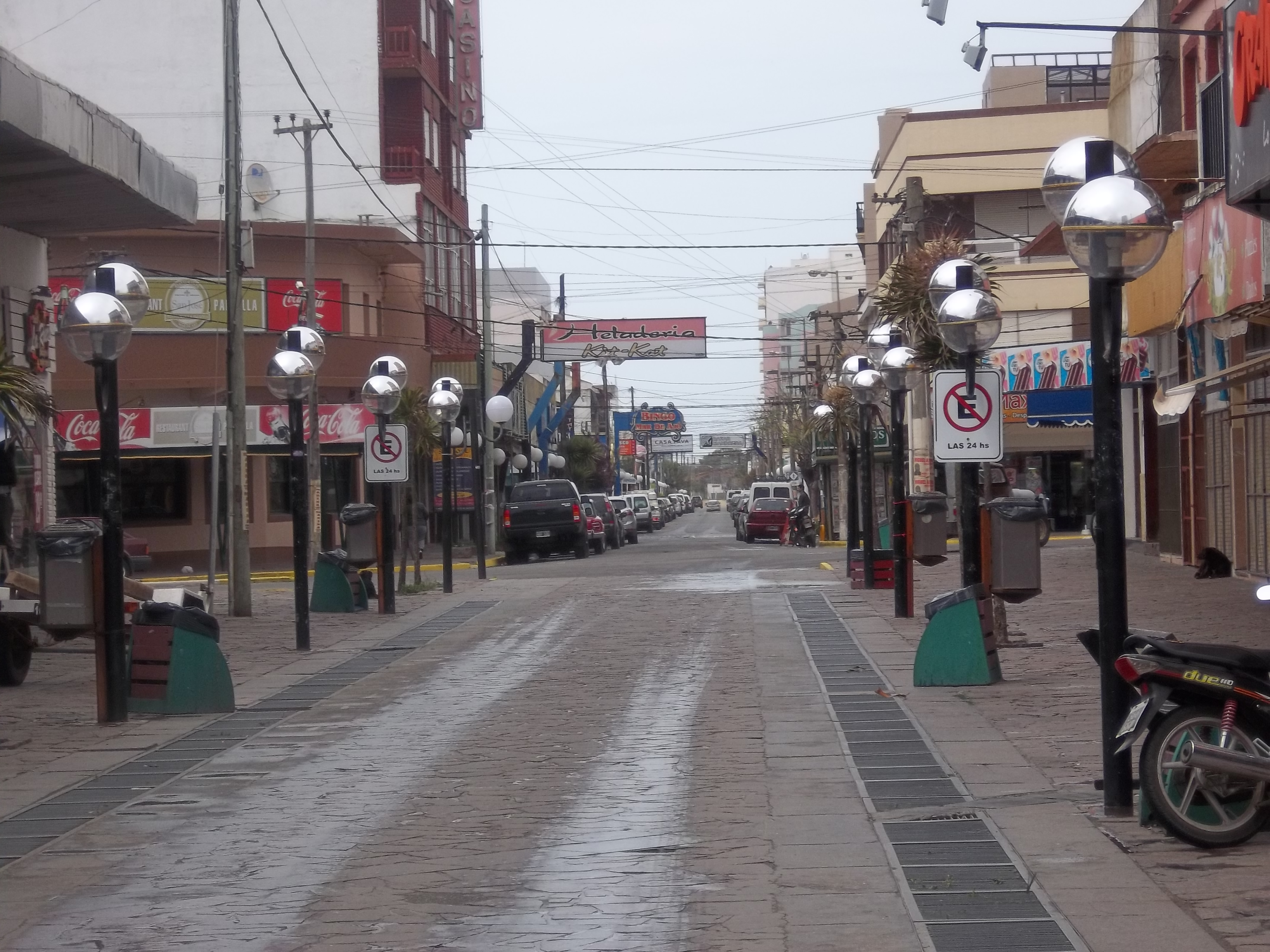
Mar de Ajó, Argentina

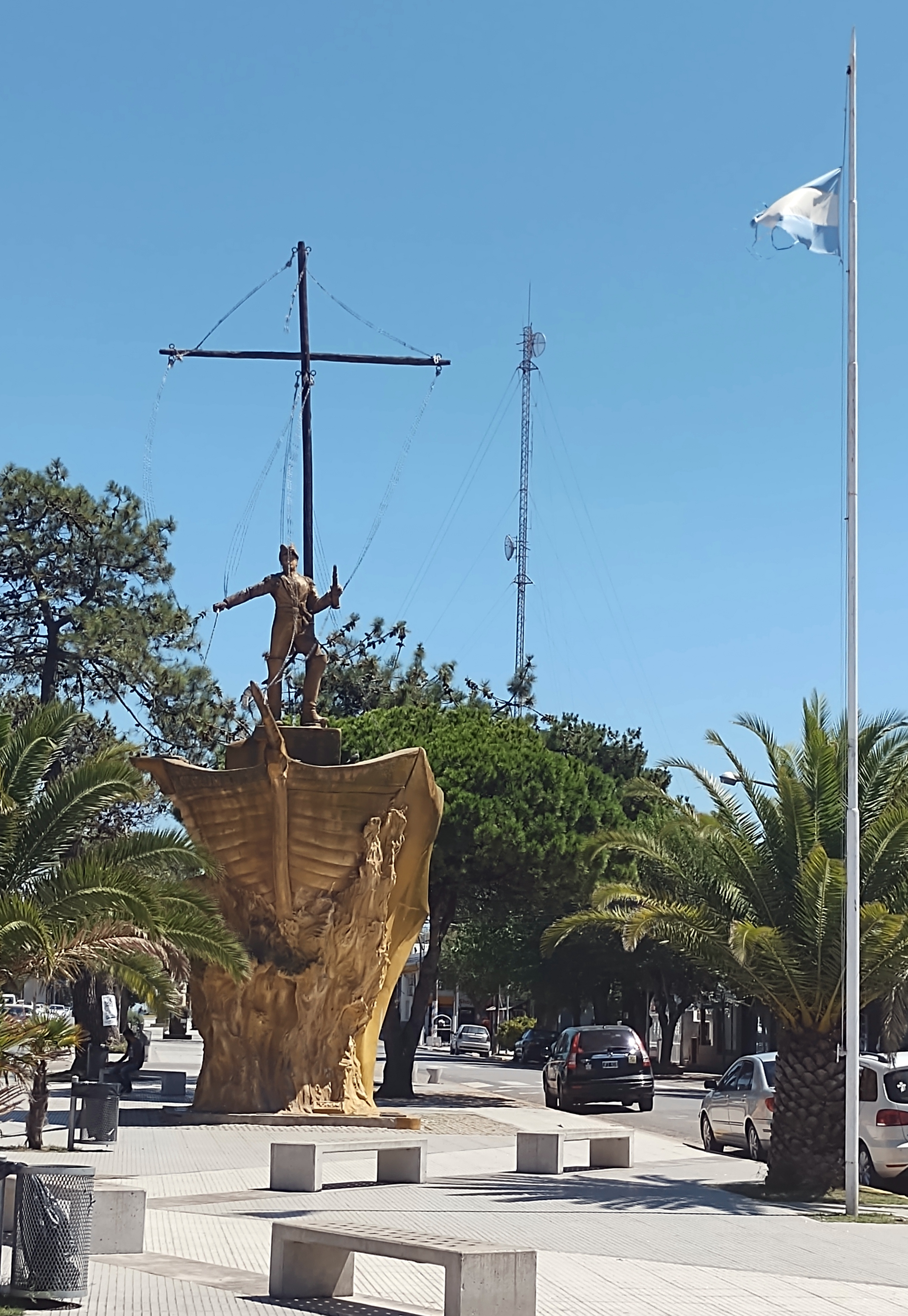
Mar de Ajó, Argentina

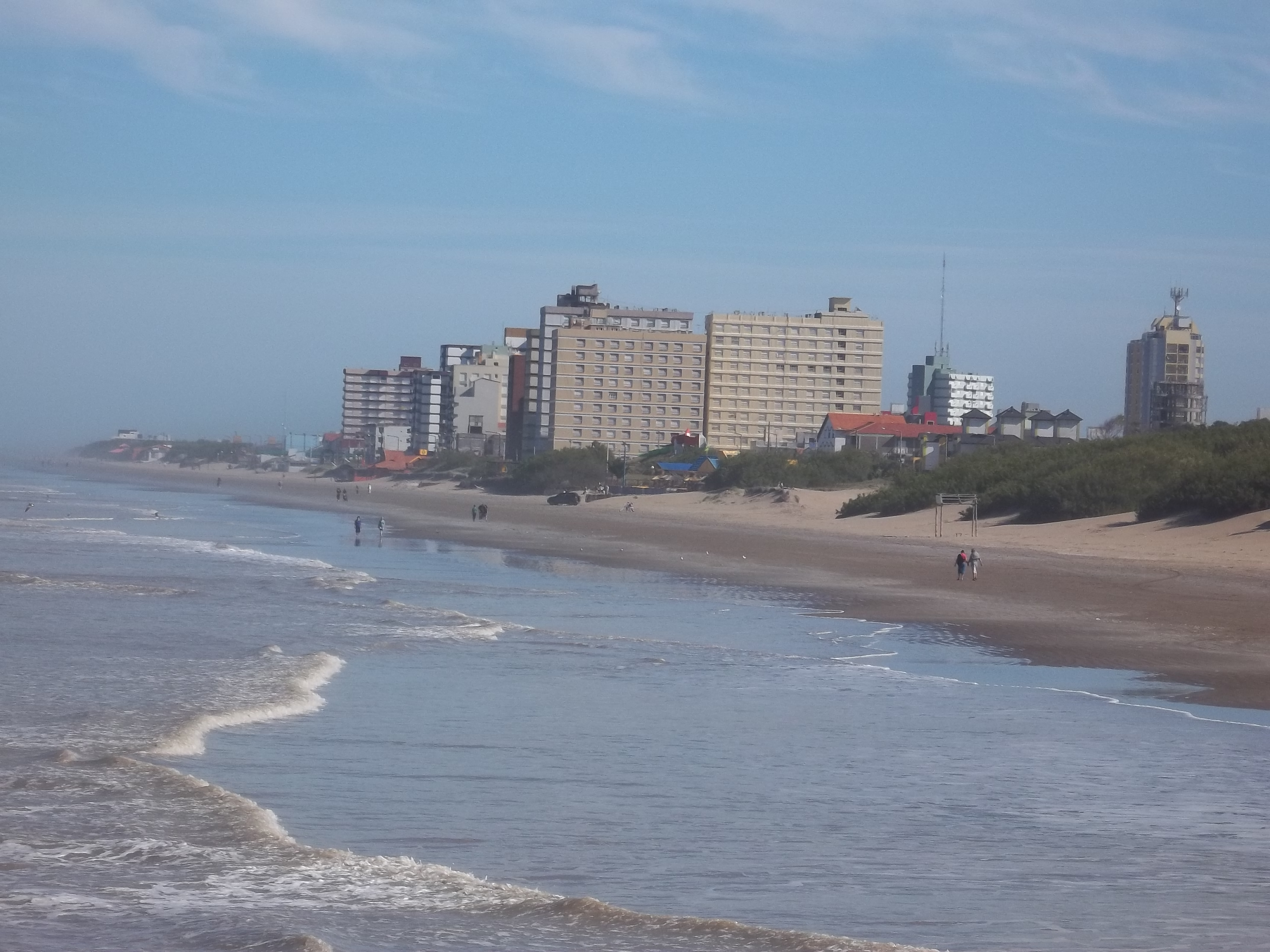
Mar de Ajó, Argentina
