= San Bernardo del Tuyú =

City in Buenos Aires Province, Argentina

- City
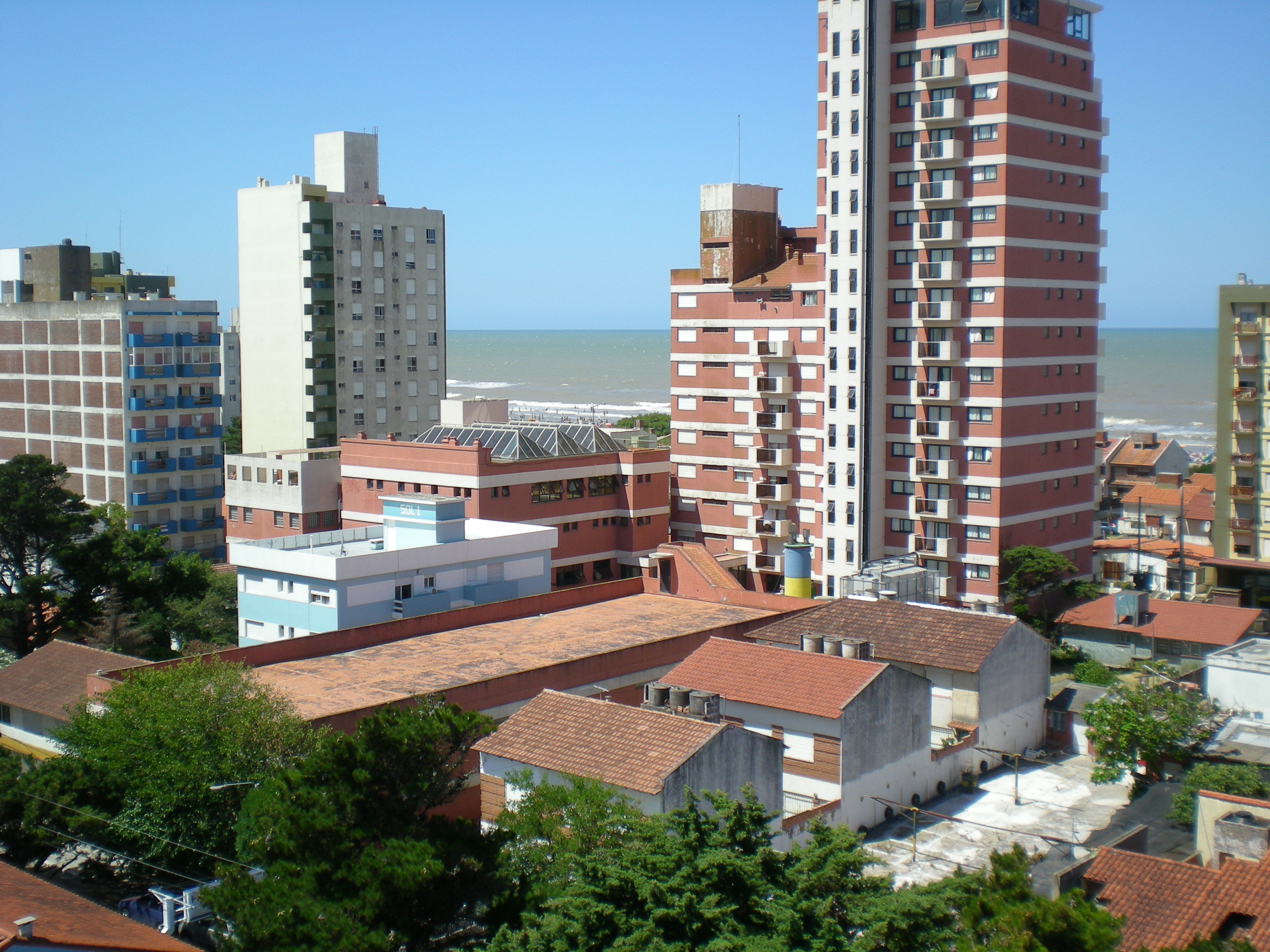

- Location within Argentina
- Coordinates: 36°42′S 56°41′W
- Country: Argentina
- Province: Buenos Aires
- Partido: La Costa
- Established: 1943
- Elevation: 8 m (26 ft)

Population (2001 census [INDEC])
  - Total: 6,966
- CPA Base: B 7111
- Area code: +54 2257
- Website: https://www.sanbernardo.com.ar/

San Bernardo del Tuyú, or simply San Bernardo, is a resort city of the Atlantic Coast located in the La Costa District of the Province of Buenos Aires, Argentina.

== History and overview ==
Founded by the Compañía Inmobiliara del Este Argentino S.R.L., a partnership of ten investors led by Juan Carlos Chiozza, San Bernardo del Tuyú originated with the 1942 purchase of 191 hectares (480 acres) along the Atlantic Ocean shore from the San Bernardo ranch, one of the Duhau family's many properties in Buenos Aires Province.

The land was subdivided into parcels, and installations for an incipient town center were added by the developers. The governor, Dr. Rodolfo Moreno, authorized the town's establishment on April 3, 1943, and the new town was christened by its developers in a 1944 ceremony.

The largely self-sufficient settlement initially grew with investments from both the developer and its residents, who pooled resources and established local electric and telephone cooperatives. Closely linked to Mar de Ajó, San Bernardo slowly grew as a tourist destination, and one of five piers in the district was built along its shores. One of its early visitors, Uruguayan Argentine poet Juan Burghi, dedicated a poem, San Bernardo, to the seaside hamlet in 1957.

The 1978 establishment of the La Costa District helped further promote the town, and numerous pubs, bingo parlors, discothèques, and theatres were established in subsequent years, notably along Costanera and San Bernardo Avenues, and Chiozza Street, which was designated a pedestrian promenade for the summer high tourist season (January 1 – March 10). Among the best-known points of interest on this latter is the Observatorio de la Costa, the district's only observatory.
