= La Lucila del Mar =

- Town
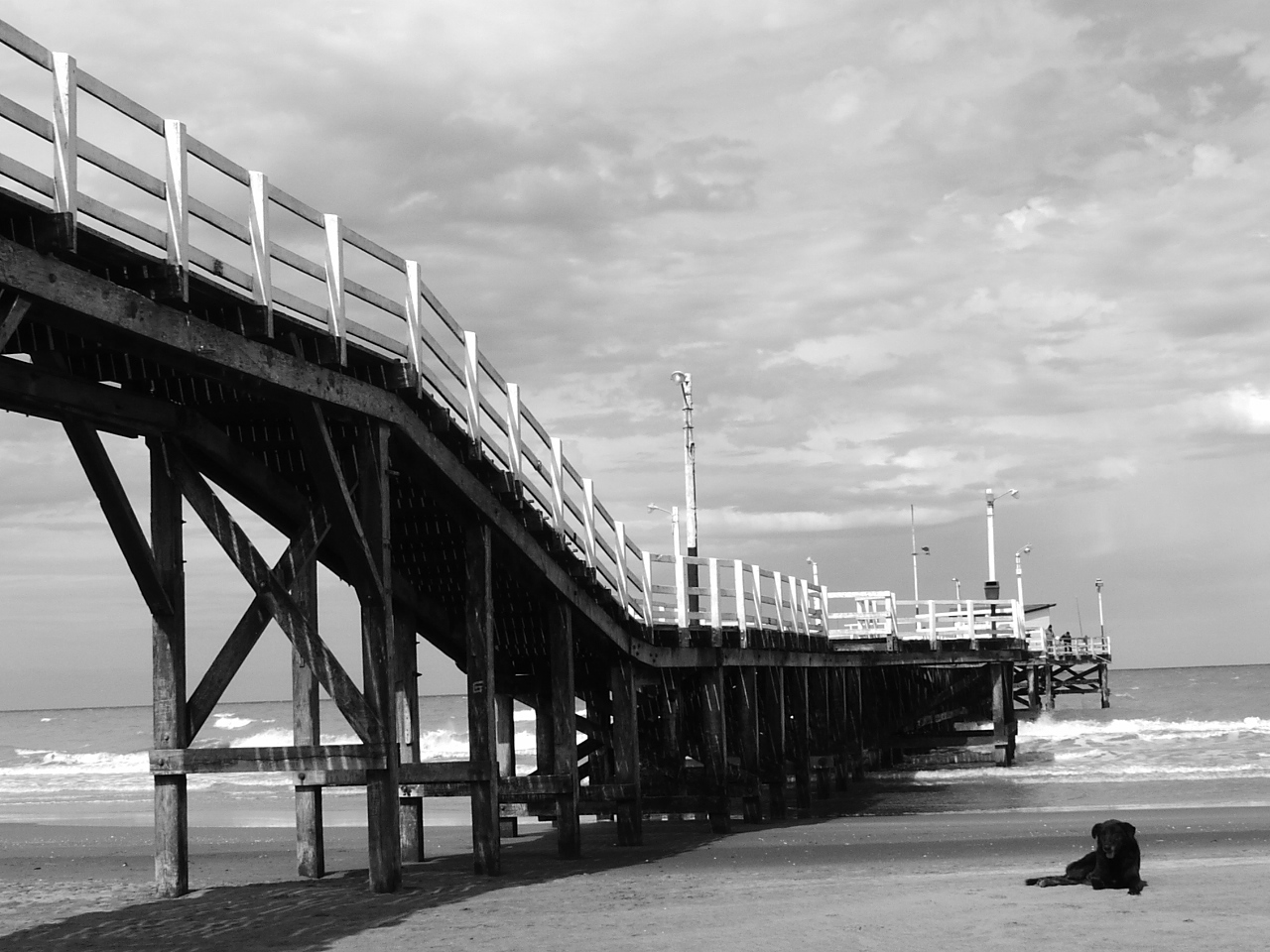
- Pier in La Lucila del Mar

- Location within Argentina
- Coordinates: 36°39′36″S 56°40′59″W
- Country: Argentina
- Province: Buenos Aires
- Partido: La Costa
- Time zone: UTC-3 (ART)
- Postal code: B7108
- Area code: +54 2246

La Lucila del Mar is a town of the Atlantic Coast in the La Costa Partido of the Province of Buenos Aires, Argentina.
