= San Clemente del Tuyú =

Town in the Province of Buenos Aires, Argentina

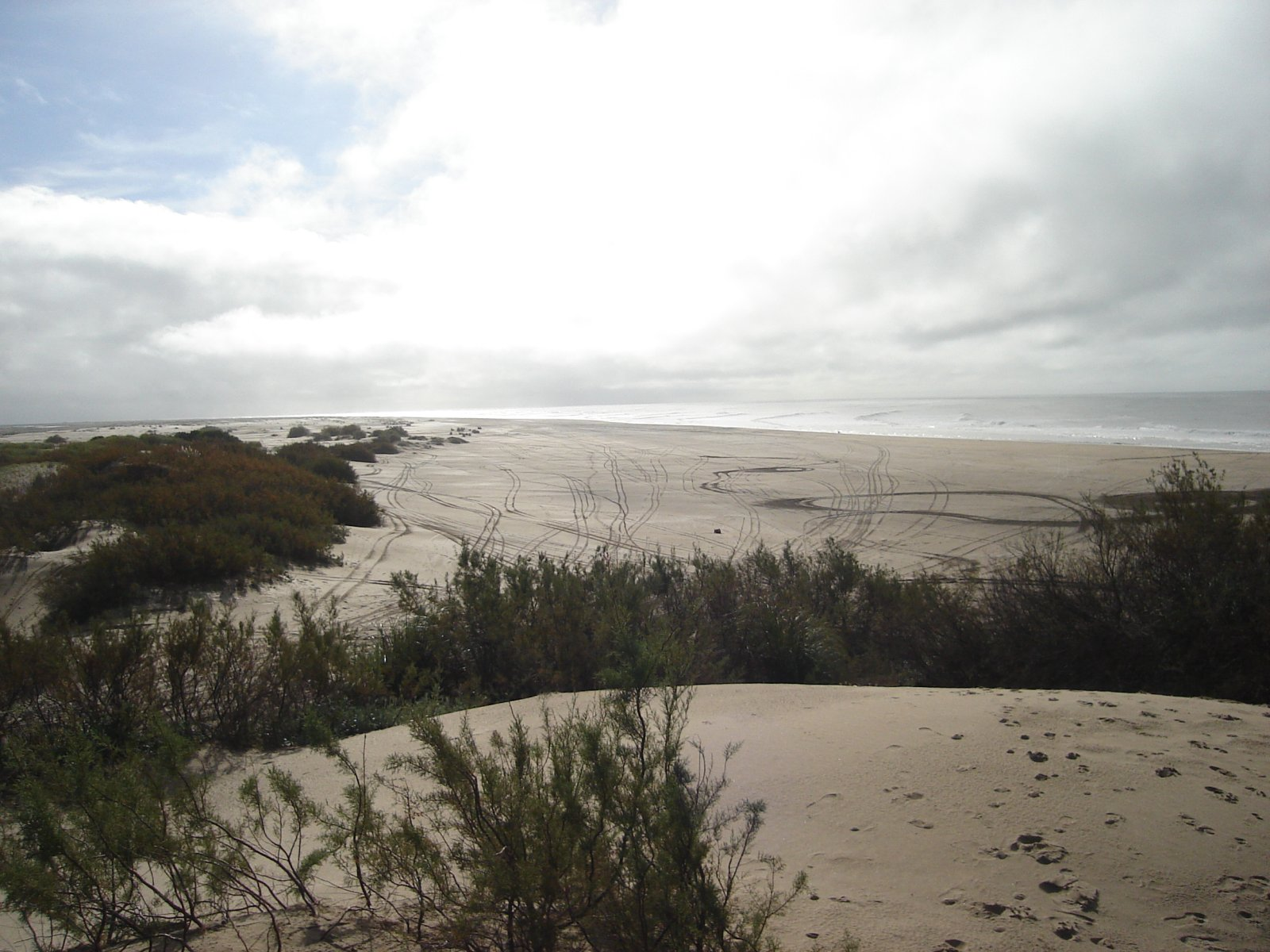
- Dunes on the San Clemente del Tuyú shore.
- Interactive map of San Clemente del Tuyú
- Coordinates: 36°22′S 56°43′W
- Country: Argentina
- Province: Buenos Aires
- Partido: La Costa
- Founded: 1935
- Elevation: 6 m (20 ft)

Population (2010 census [INDEC])
  - Total: 12,126
- CPA Base: B 7105
- Area code: +54 02252
- Website: San Clemente del Tuyú

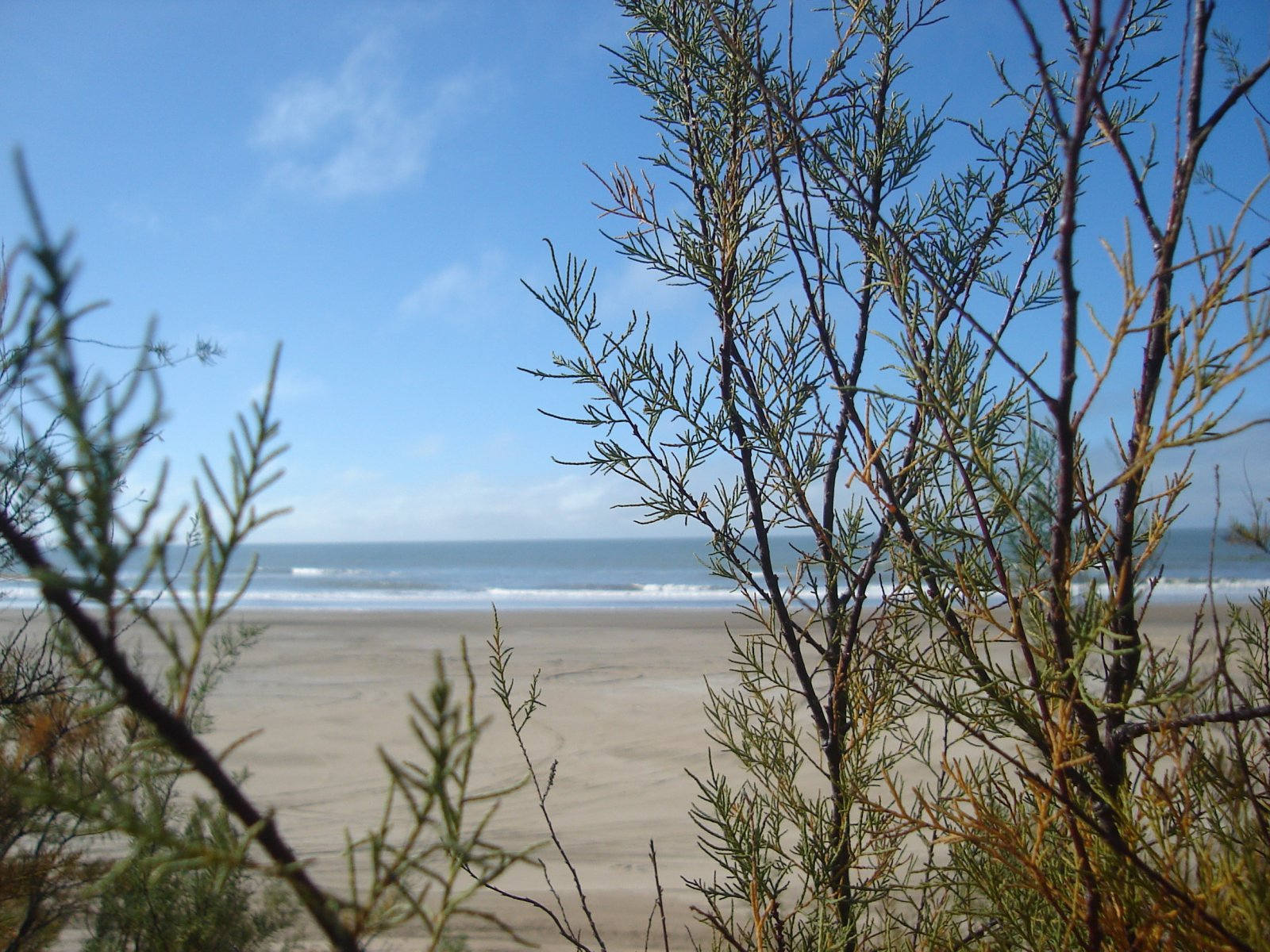
Shore during the off-season.

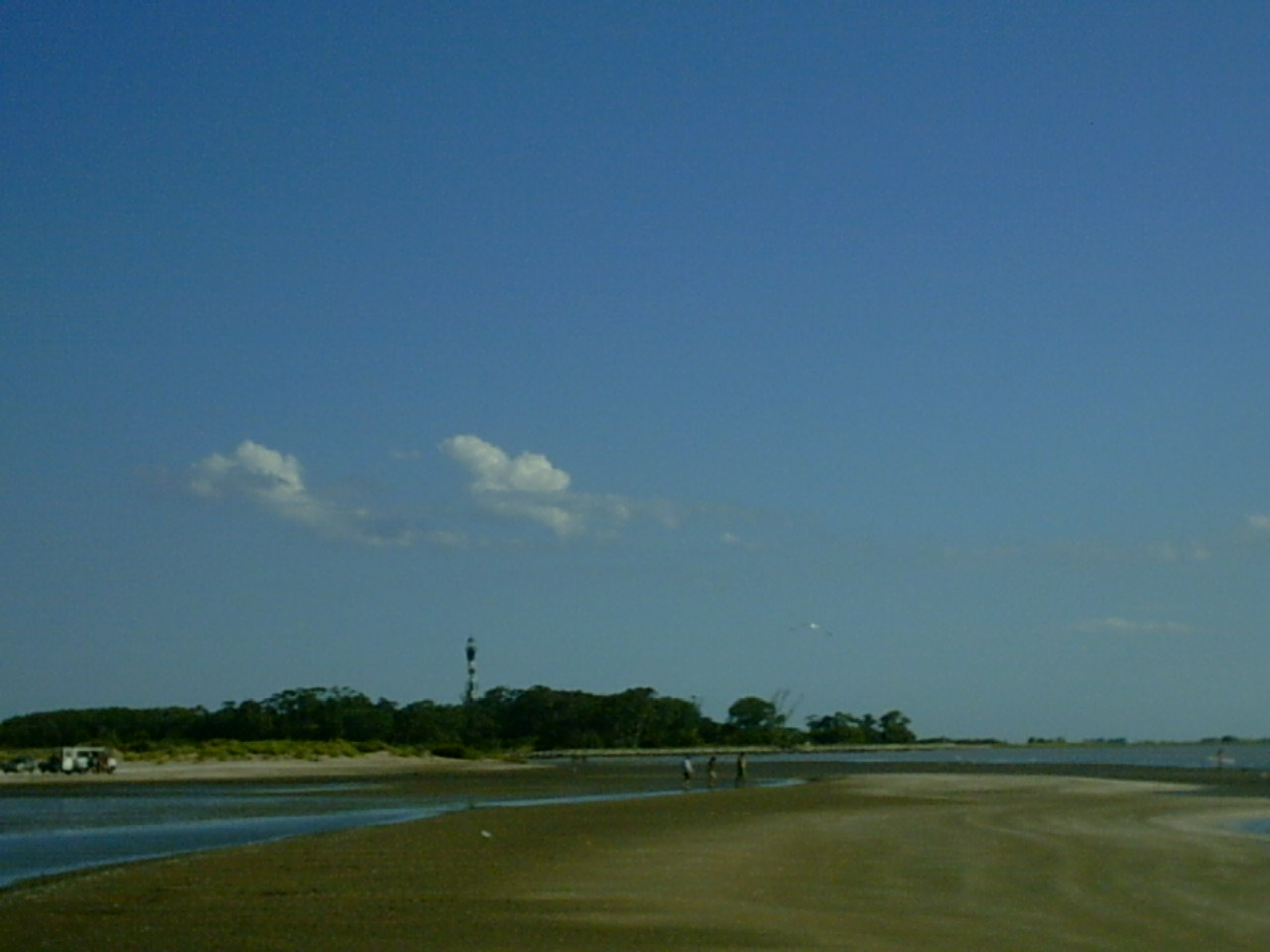
Punta Rasa.

San Clemente del Tuyú is an Argentine town of the Atlantic Coast located in the Partido de La Costa district of the Province of Buenos Aires.

== History ==
Noticed by Ferdinand Magellan in 1520, who gave nearby Cape San Antonio its name, Spanish authorities first surveyed the area in 1580. Led by reformist Governor Hernando Arias de Saavedra, his Guaraní staff christened the spot Rincón del Tuyú ("muddy corner"). First mapped by British Jesuit Thomas Falkner in 1744, the neighboring stream was named San Clemente by Spanish Jesuit José Cardiel.

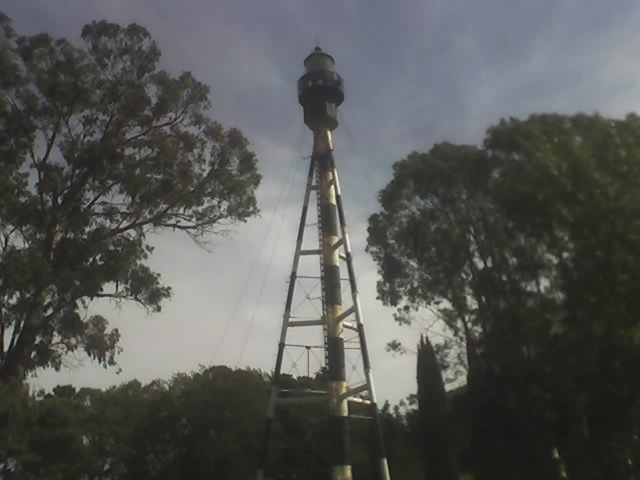
The San Antonio lighthouse, built in 1890.

The waterfront area was soon purchased by the Ortiz de Rozas family, one of Argentina's most well-established landowners. Sold to another prominent family, the Leloirs, in 1816, the area became a sheep ranch. A descendant of the Ortiz de Rozas', General Juan Manuel de Rosas, had the area incorporated into a district of the Province of Buenos Aires in 1825, the area's first assigned jurisdiction since national independence in 1816; as governor, Rosas brutally repressed a local insurrection in 1839 against his repressive rule. Following Rosas' 1852 overthrow, the area was given a county seat (Mar del Tuyú) in 1864 and, with the arrival of abattoirs, the government had fishermen's docks, a canal between San Clemente and Buenos Aires, a railhead and two lighthouses built between 1878 and 1902.

Prospering during the 1920s, the Argentine middle class first became widely aware of the idyllic coast through the efforts of Mayor Jorge Gibson, who had the local coastline graded into public beaches. The project's success led to the first gravel road into San Clemente in 1932 and its formal designation as a municipality; soon followed service stations, campgrounds, real estate developments, a power plant and even a monastery. President Juan Perón made plans for a nearby submarine base that, though never built, resulted in a four-lane highway into San Clemente. This and continuing national prosperity led to the town's rapid development after 1950, which led to the establishment of a hospital in 1970 and of Mundo Marino in 1979, still the largest oceanarium in South America.

A nature theme park (Parque Bahía Aventura) opened in 1997; drawing few crowds, the area was slated for closure when, in 2003, mineral hot springs were discovered at the spot. County Mayor Juan de Jesús set aside part of Bahía Aventura and opened Termas Marinas, today one of Argentina's most popular hot springs.

Tapera of Lòpez: 1922: is there installed the young marriage formed by Manuel López and Magdalena Luero. Manuel was engaged in fishing and fish salting built there, in that place they had 12 children.

=== The city today ===
San Clemente del Tuyú, the northernmost among seven sea-side communities in the Partido de la Costa district, today counts 27 hotels (of which 14 are three or four-star establishments). The aquarium, adventure park and hot springs are complemented by two natural sciences museums, fishing boat tours and the 129 meter (400 feet) -long pier, among other parks and attractions. Punta Rasa, at the northern end of the city and the cape, was made a nature preserve in 1997. The activity around fishing boat tours centers around the black corvine feast held annually since 1966, towards December. The area's vast dunes also set the stage for the annual Enduro competition held here every February since 1998. A small but loyal contingent of visitors also arrives seasonally from San Clemente, California, a sister city of San Clemente del Tuyú since 1969.

The seven sister communities receive nearly a million visitors monthly during the peak summer season (January and February), of which San Clemente del Tuyú hosts roughly one tenth, given its proportion of the district's hotel room availability. A considerable number of summertime visitors also came to enjoy Benedictine monk Mamerto Menapace's sermons and lectures, which took place at the order's San Clemente estancia and offers ascetic "pilgrim" accommodations. San Clemente del Tuyú hosted the Sixth Iberoamerican Congress on Environmental Education in September 2009. Manepace died in June 2025.

== Climate ==
Climate data for San Clemente del Tuyú
| Month | Jan | Feb | Mar | Apr | May | Jun | Jul | Aug | Sep | Oct | Nov | Dec | Year |
|---|---|---|---|---|---|---|---|---|---|---|---|---|---|
| Mean daily maximum °C (°F) | 25.9 (78.6) | 25.3 (77.5) | 23.9 (75.0) | 20.1 (68.2) | 13.7 (56.7) | 13.6 (56.5) | 12.7 (54.9) | 14.0 (57.2) | 15.6 (60.1) | 18.4 (65.1) | 21.9 (71.4) | 24.4 (75.9) | 19.1 (66.4) |
| Daily mean °C (°F) | 20.4 (68.7) | 20.3 (68.5) | 18.3 (64.9) | 15.1 (59.2) | 12.4 (54.3) | 9.5 (49.1) | 8.5 (47.3) | 9.4 (48.9) | 10.8 (51.4) | 13.4 (56.1) | 16.5 (61.7) | 18.8 (65.8) | 14.5 (58.1) |
| Mean daily minimum °C (°F) | 17.7 (63.9) | 17.6 (63.7) | 15.3 (59.5) | 11.7 (53.1) | 9.0 (48.2) | 6.5 (43.7) | 6.2 (43.2) | 6.5 (43.7) | 8.1 (46.6) | 10.7 (51.3) | 13.8 (56.8) | 15.8 (60.4) | 11.6 (52.9) |
| Average precipitation mm (inches) | 89 (3.5) | 84 (3.3) | 147 (5.8) | 72 (2.8) | 57 (2.2) | 63 (2.5) | 102 (4.0) | 88 (3.5) | 85 (3.3) | 95 (3.7) | 70 (2.8) | 101 (4.0) | 1,053 (41.5) |
| Average precipitation days | 6 | 5 | 5 | 4 | 4 | 4 | 5 | 5 | 4 | 5 | 5 | 6 | 58 |
| Average relative humidity (%) | 83 | 84 | 85 | 84 | 85 | 88 | 90 | 87 | 85 | 86 | 85 | 81 | 85 |
Source: Servicio Meteorológico Nacional

== Sister cities ==
- (United States) San Clemente, California
