= Santa Teresita, Buenos Aires =

City in Buenos Aires Province, Argentina

Santa Teresita
- City
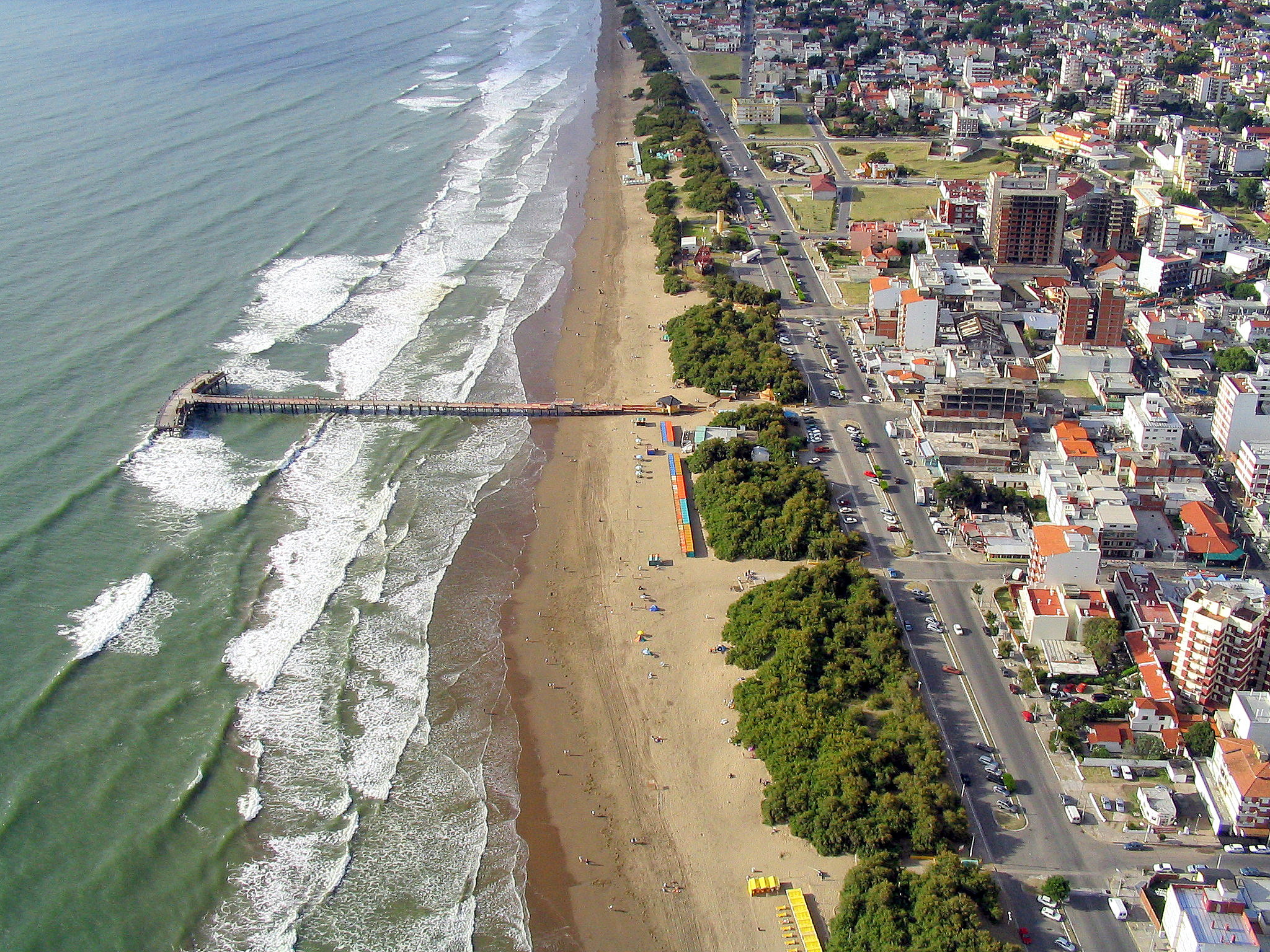
- Interactive map of Santa Teresita
- Coordinates: 36°33′S 56°41′W
- Country: Argentina
- Province: Buenos Aires
- Partido: La Costa
- Established: 1946
- Elevation: 1 m (3.3 ft)

Population (2010 census [INDEC])
  - Total: 15,213
- CPA Base: B 7107
- Area code: +54 2246
- Website: http://www.santateresita.com.ar/

Santa Teresita is a city of the Atlantic Coast, in the La Costa Partido of the Province of Buenos Aires, Argentina.

== History and overview ==
Established in 1946, the town owed its initial growth to the Santa Teresita Development Association led by José Milano, who successfully lobbied provincial authorities for paved roads, a telephone exchange, power plant, and clinic (all of which had been opened by 1949). A curupay wooden pier was built by the association in 1947, and in 1972, extended to 200 m (656 ft) – though damage from a 1983 storm later led to its rebuilding in concrete.

U.S. engineer Luther Koontz, who had stayed in Argentina after helping Alister MacKenzie design two golf courses for the Argentine Jockey Club, opened the Santa Teresita Golf Club in 1950, and the first lodging establishment, the Hostería Santa Teresita, was opened by Horacio Fiocco and Angel de Martino. Four hotels opened during the 1950s, and in 1959, the town's best known inn, the Hotel Bristol, welcomed its first guests. The 1960 Census counted 547 year-round residents.

A monthly periodical, Santa Teresita, was started in 1958, as was Stefani Brothers, the first local home builder. Schools, cinemas, cafés, and a police department were added, and in 1965, the Jorge Newbery Airfield. The town's first local bank, the Banco de Crédito Rural Argentino, opened in 1967, though mismanagement led to its collapse in 1986.

Growing to 6,240 year-round residents by 1980, Santa Teresita became a distance learning hub through a 2007 agreement with the National University of Mar del Plata, for which a VHF radio transmitter is used at the meteorological station.

== La Plata dolphin incident ==
In February 2016, Santa Teresita gained international notoriety after numerous beach-goers surrounded, removed, and proceeded to handle and take "selfies" with an extremely rare and endangered La Plata dolphin, leaving it to die in the mud on the beach. The behavior of the participants sparked international outrage.

== Gallery ==
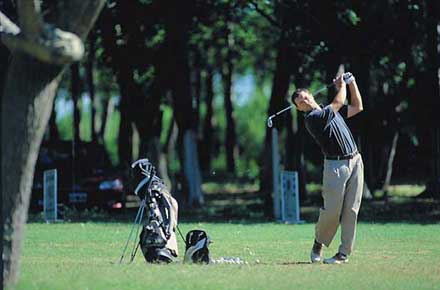
Santa Teresita Golf Club

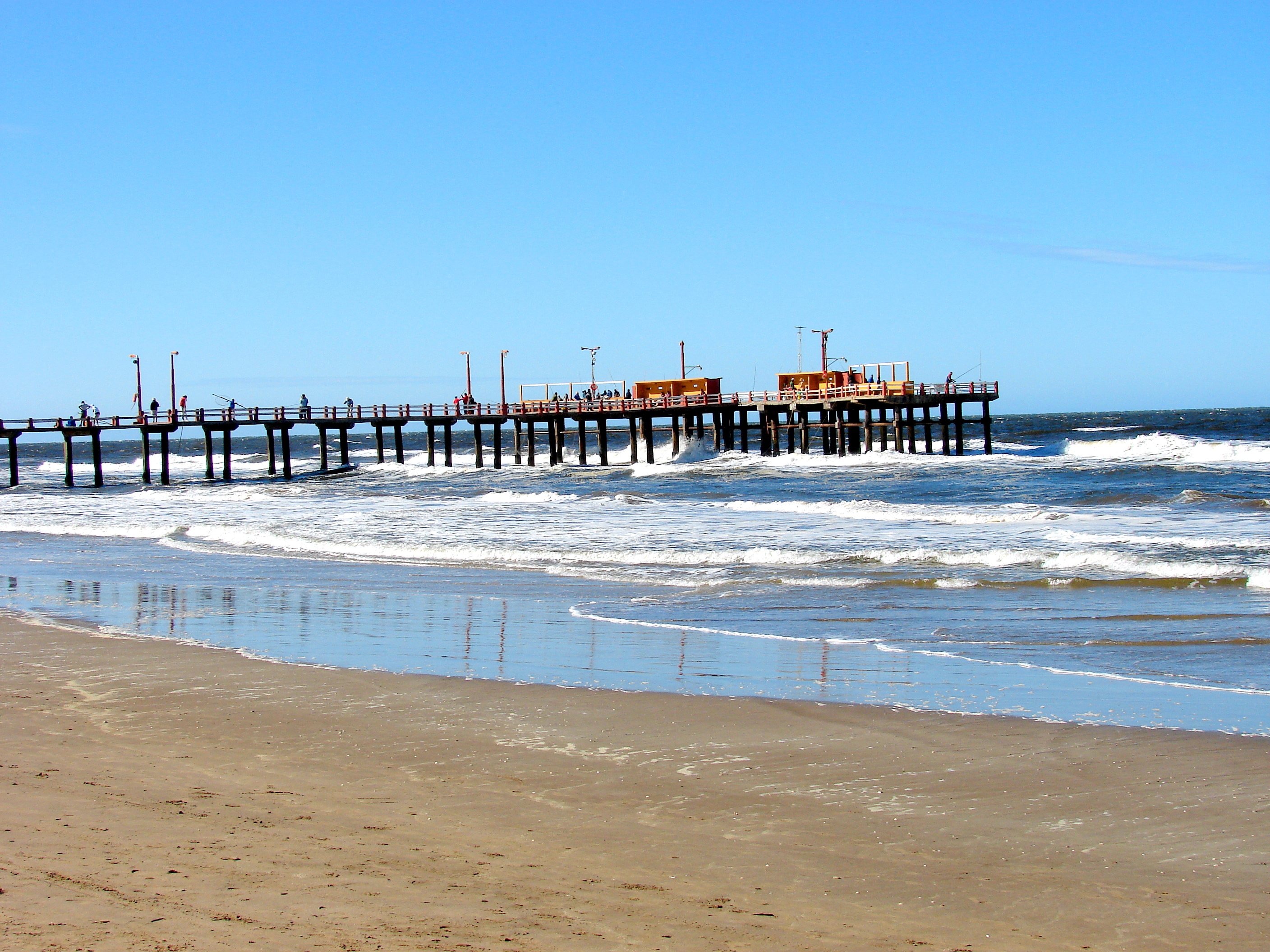
Pier

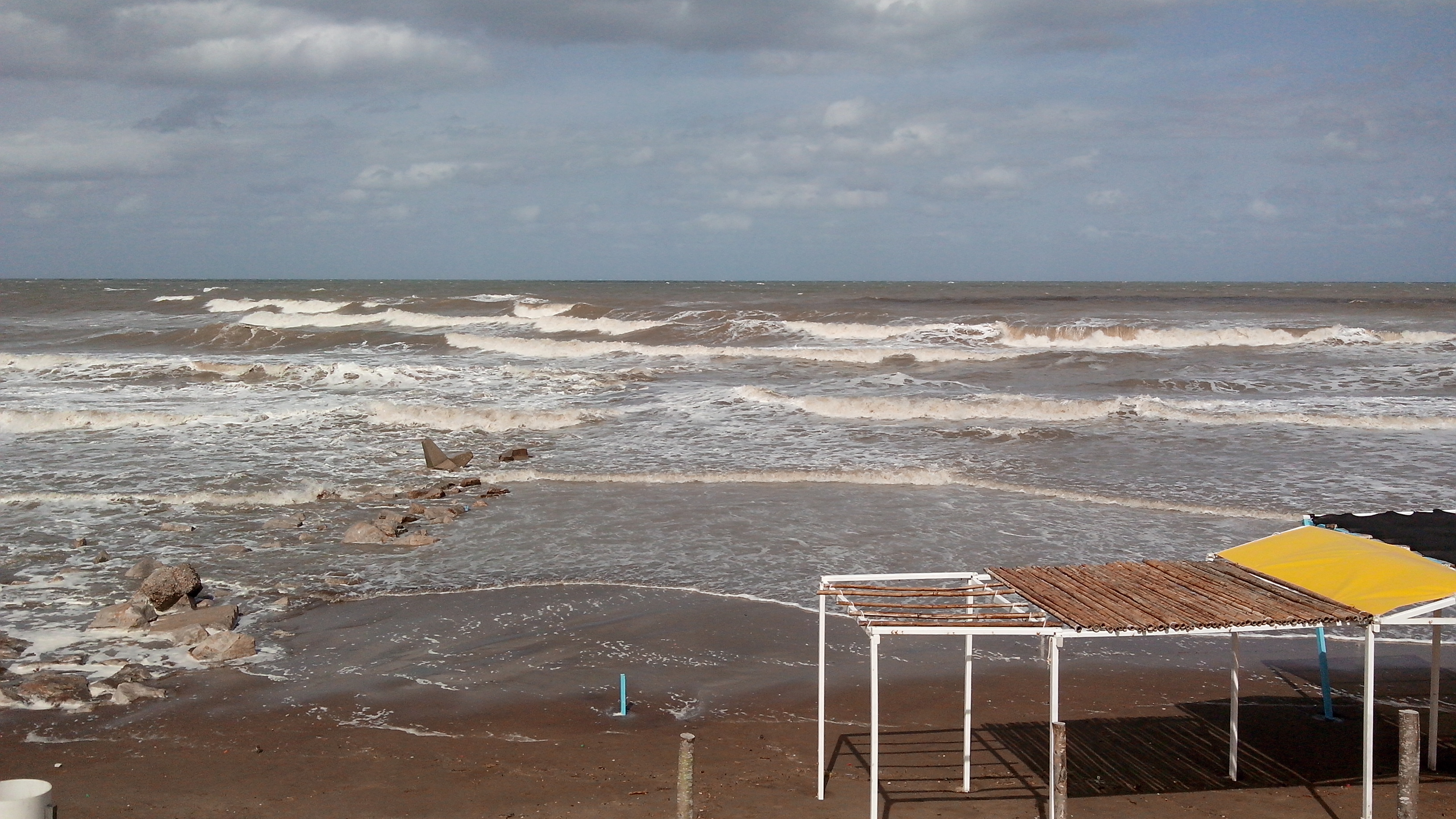
Beach after a Storm
