= Terrestrial cable =

Communications cable crossing land, rather than water

A terrestrial cable is a communications cable which crosses land, rather than water. Terrestrial cable may be subterranean (buried) or aerial (suspended from poles), and may be fiber or copper. The term "terrestrial cable" is principally used to distinguish it from submarine cable, although some overlap exists between the two.

Major terrestrial cable systems include the Europe-Persia Express Gateway and the family of Eurasia terrestrial cable networks.

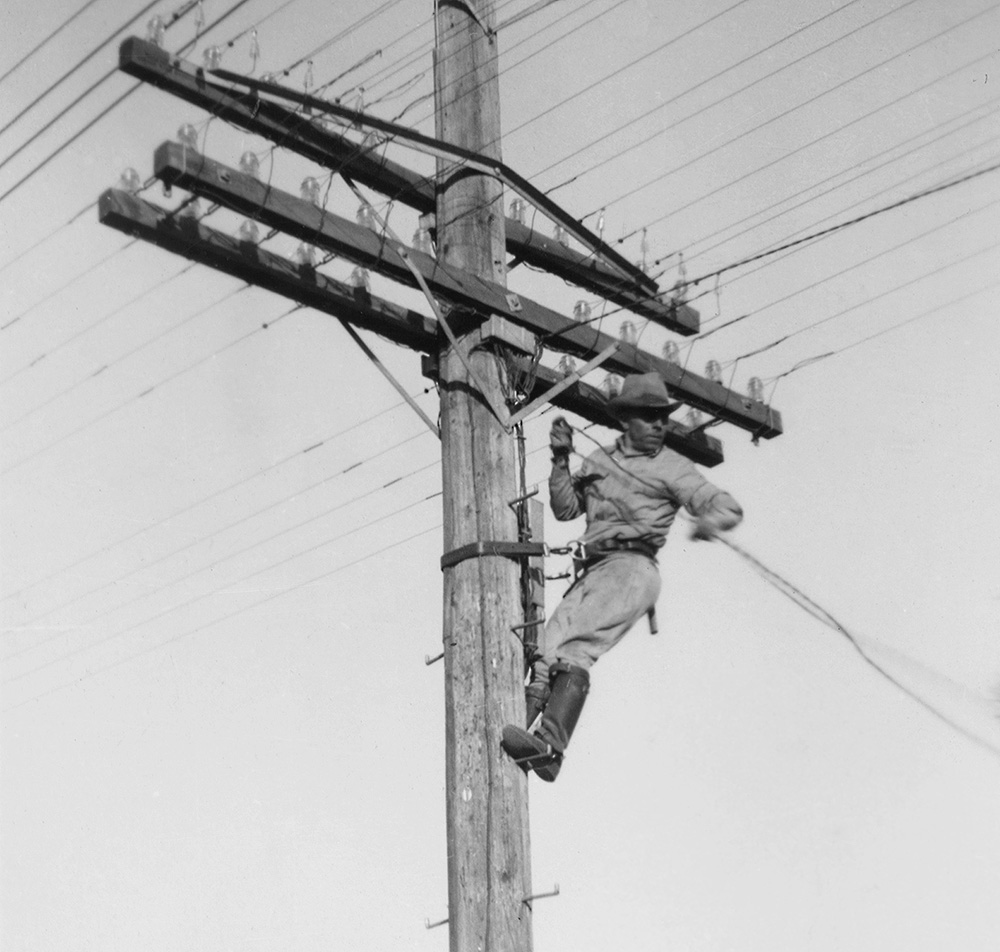
Telephone lineman suspending aerial communications cable from a pole, 1940.

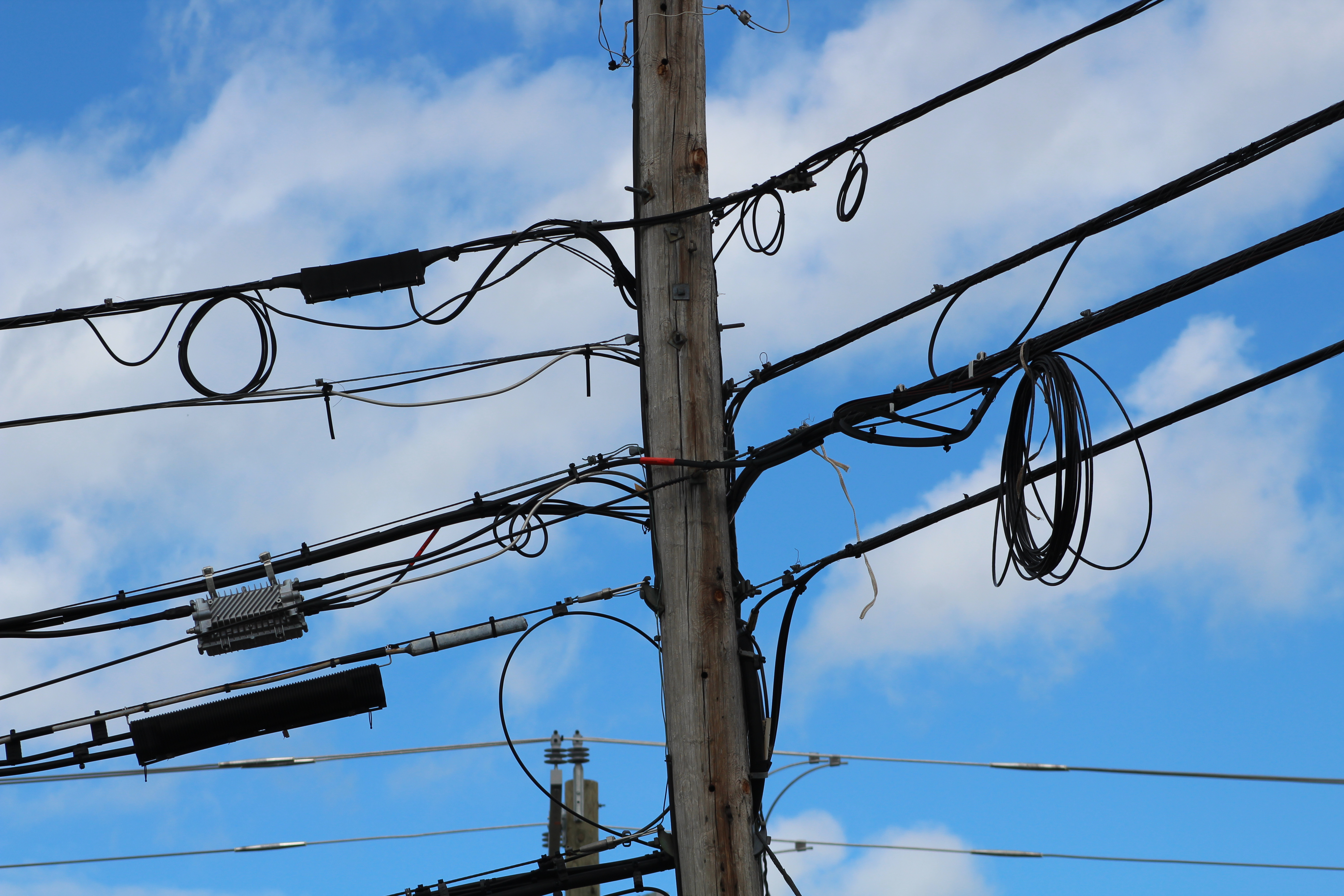
Mixed fiber and copper communications cables carrying telephone, television, and Internet, 2017.

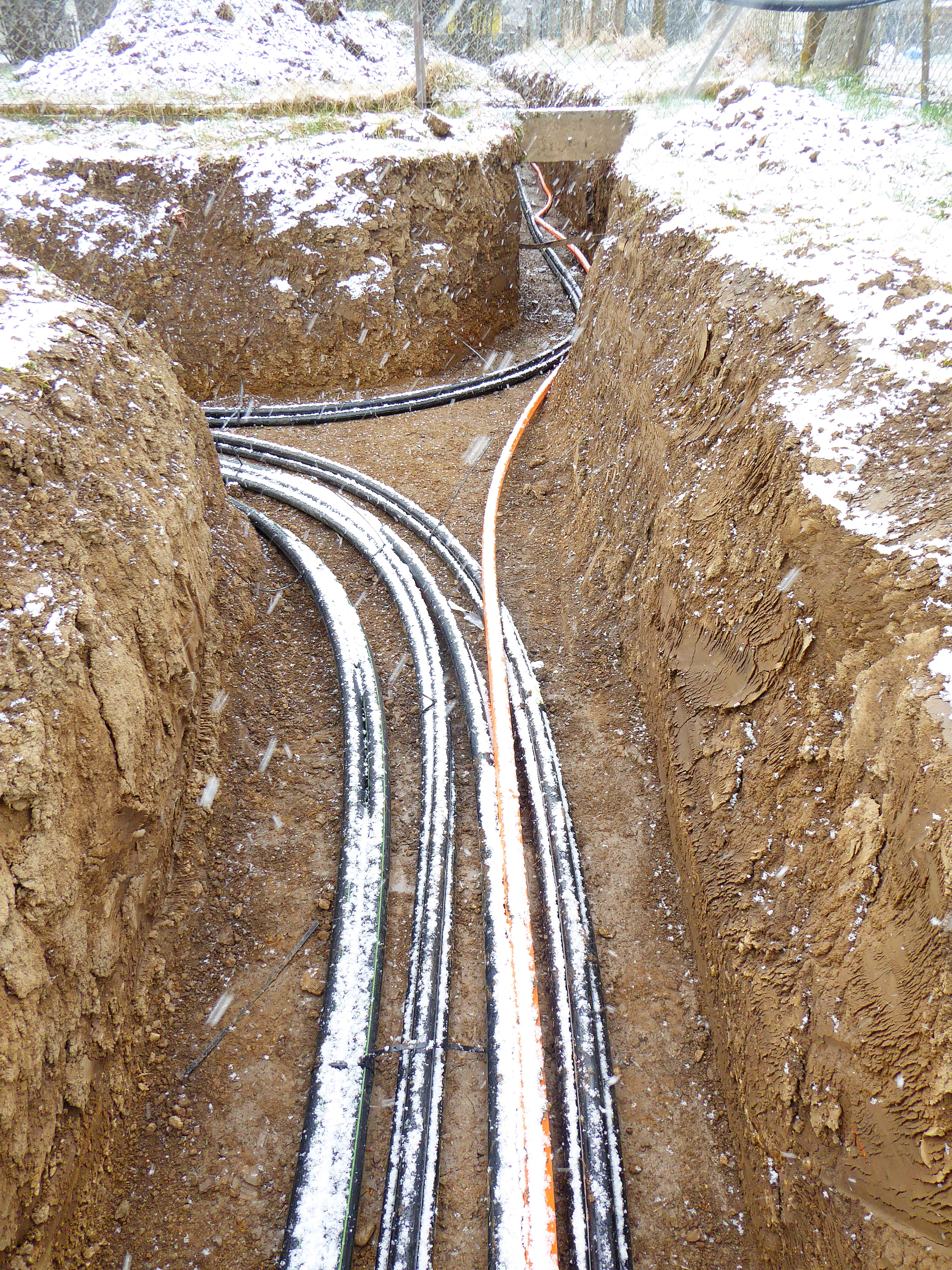
Subterranean cables being buried in a trench, 2021.

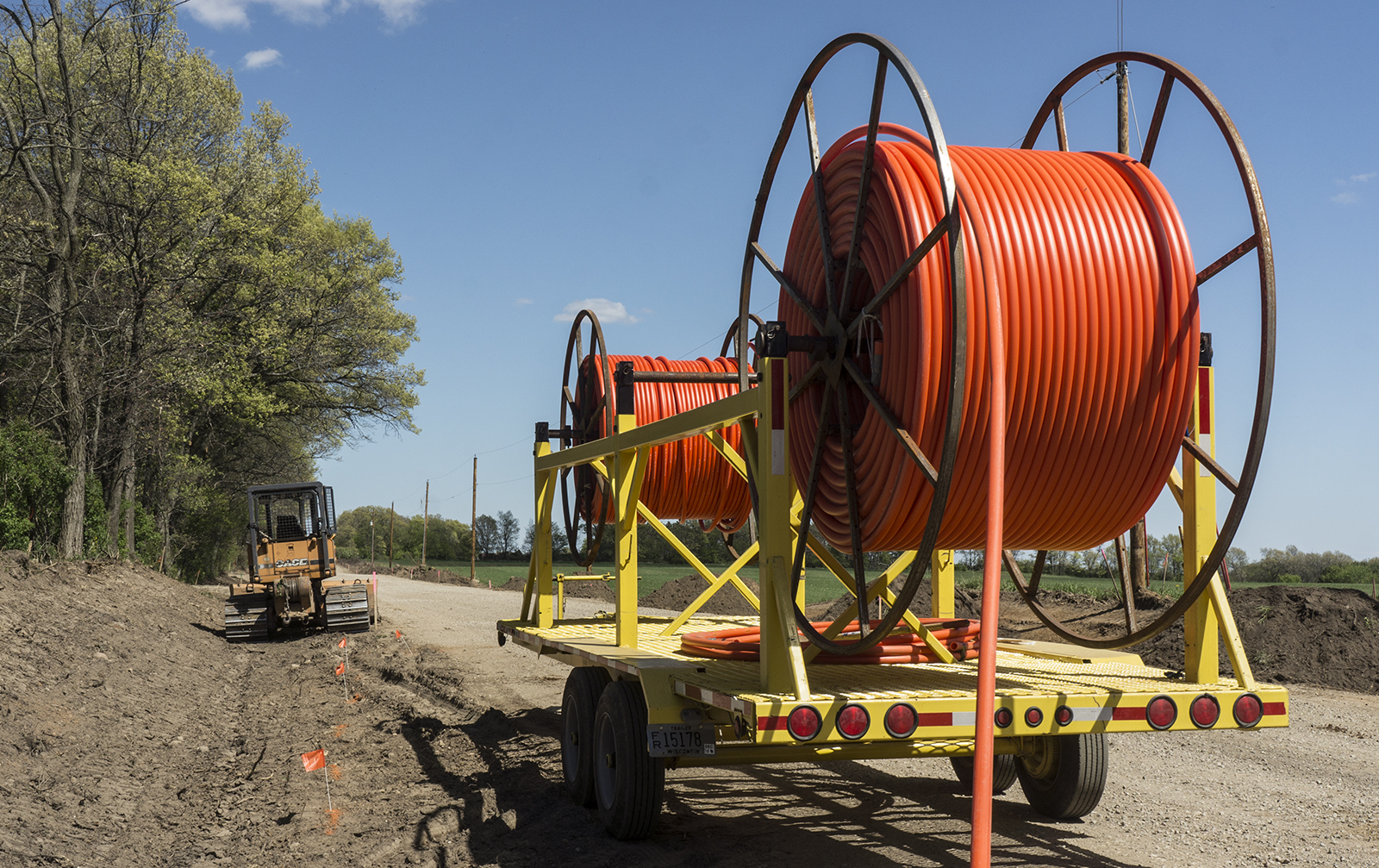
Fiber-optic communications cable being buried in protective duct, 2016.

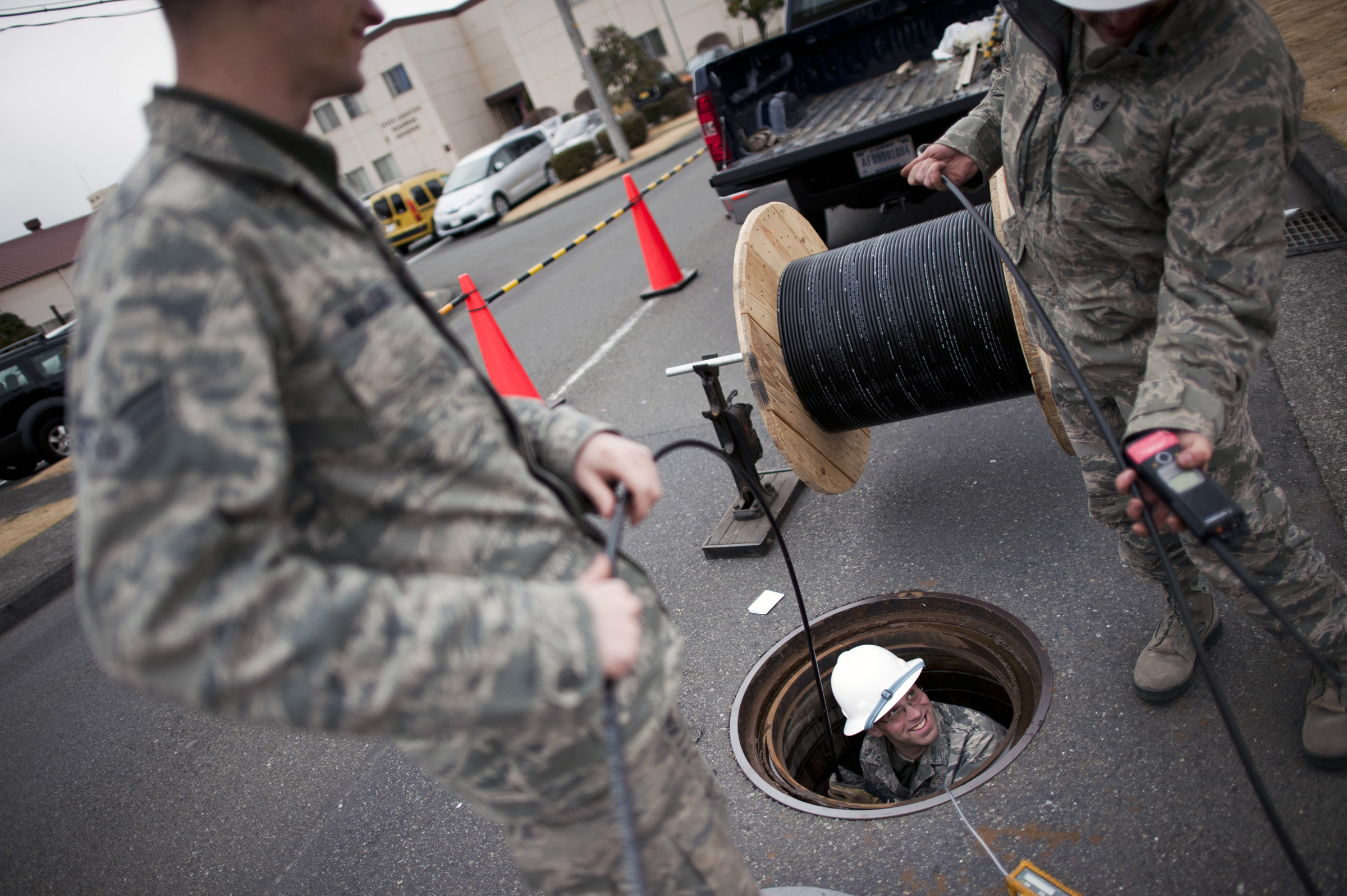
Fiber-optic communications cable being installed in a manhole, 2011.

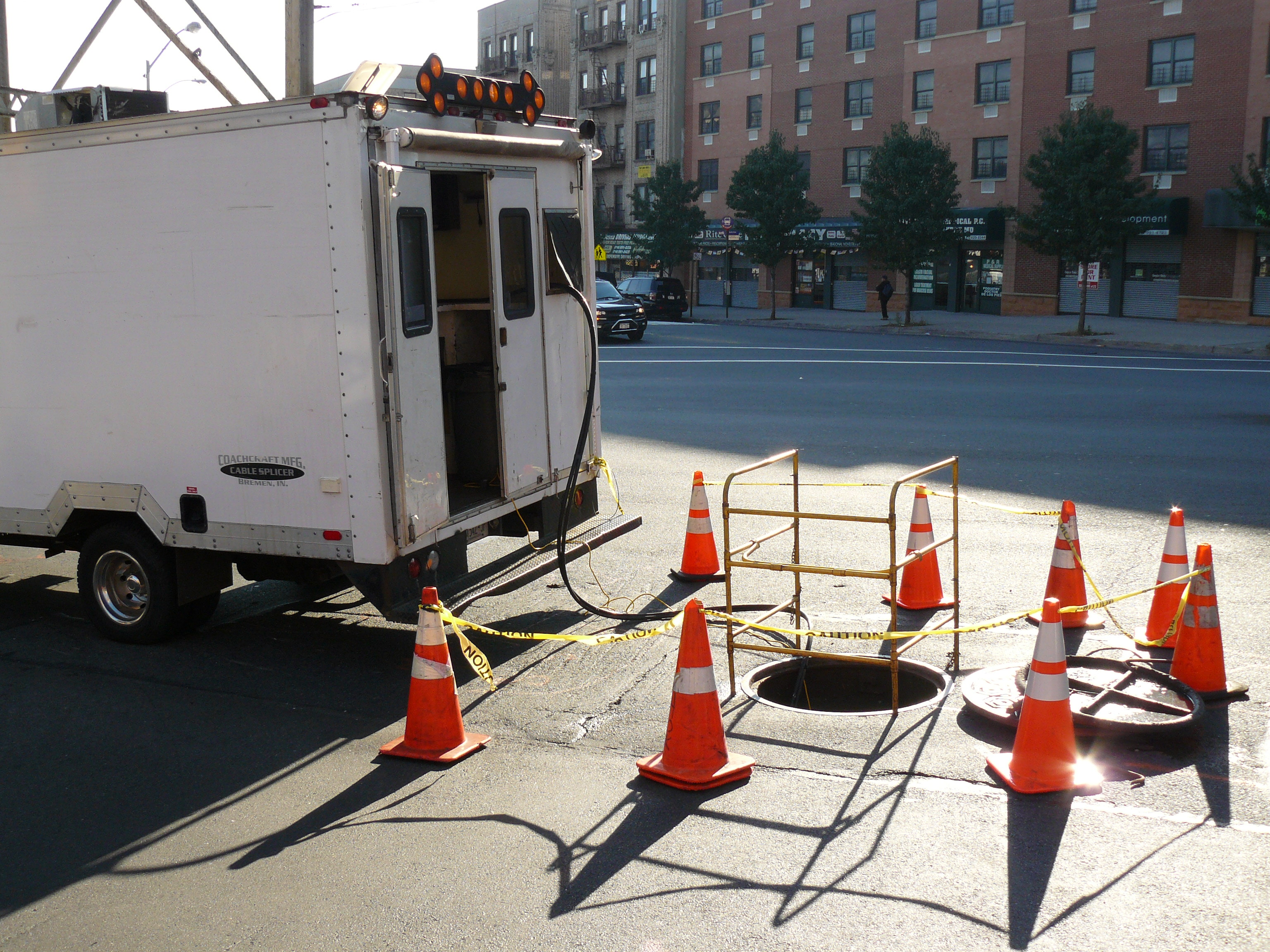
Portable fiber splicing hut working above a manhole, 2007.

== See also ==
- Aerial cable
- Utility pole
- Undergrounding
- Direct-buried cable
- List of terrestrial fibre optic cable projects in Africa
