= List of terrestrial fibre optic cable projects in Africa =

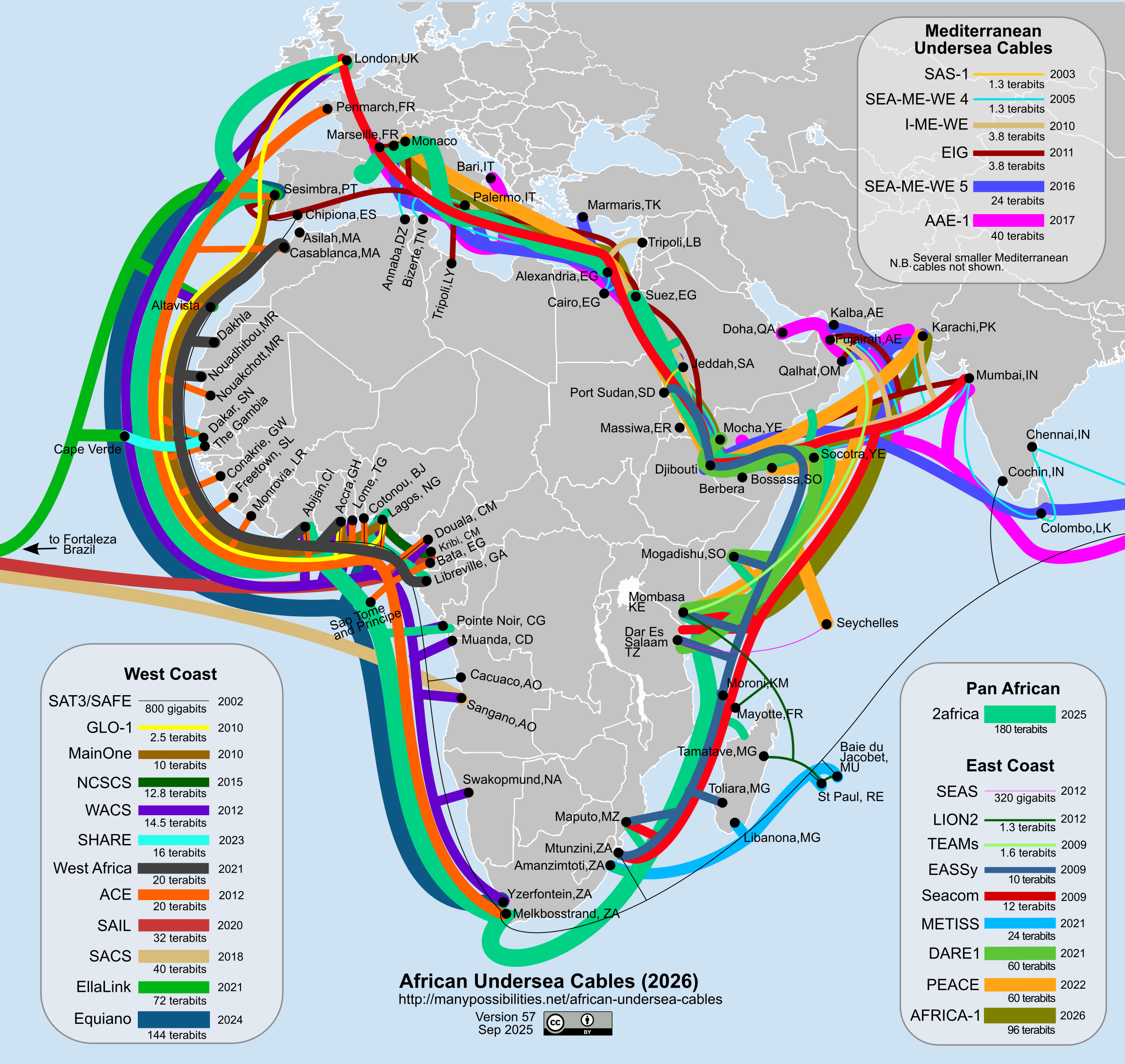
Map of active and planned African undersea fibre optic cables, as of September 2025

This is a list of terrestrial fibre optic cable projects in Africa. While submarine communications cables are used to connect countries and continents to the Internet, terrestrial fibre optic cables are used to extend this connectivity to landlocked countries or to urban centers within a country that has submarine cable access. In most of the world, a large number of such cables exist, often amounting to robust Internet backbones. The lack of such high-speed cables poses a great problem for most African countries. The construction of both submarine cables and their terrestrial extensions is thus considered an important step to economic growth and development to many African countries.

== Countries ==
=== Algeria ===
Operator	Started	Notes	Ref
Algérie Télécom	2011	About 200,000 km (120,000 mi) of fiber optic cables had been deployed as of December 31, 2021.	

=== Angola ===
Operator	Started	Notes	Ref
Africell	2022		
Angola Telecom	1996		
Unitel	2014		
Zap Fibra	2017		

=== Benin ===
Operator	Started	Notes	Ref
Benin Telecoms	2016		
Liquid Telecom	2018		
Phase3 Telecom	2009		
Suburban Telecoms	2007		

=== Botswana ===
Operator	Started	Notes	Ref
Botswana Fibre Networks	2012	Completed the Trans-Kalahari Fibre Optic Project in 2008.	
Mascom	2013	In 2018, Mascom announced they would be laying Botswana's "first fibre-to-the-home service."	
Paratus Botswana			

=== Burkina Faso ===
Operator	Started	Notes	Ref
Bharti Airtel			
Group Vivendi Africa	2021		
Onatel	2020	State-run	
Orange S.A.	2021		

=== Burundi ===
Operator	Started	Notes	Ref
Burundi Backbone Service		Burundi launched an ICT backbone in 2016.	
Viettel/Lumitel			
Onatel Burundi		Website content offline as of 5/24/2018	
SEACOM			

=== Cameroon ===
Operator	Started	Notes	Ref
MTN Group			
Camtel		State-owned	

=== Chad ===
Operator	Started	Notes	Ref
Camtel	2012		
SudaChad			
Sudatel			

=== Cote d'Ivoire ===
Operator	Started	Notes	Ref
Cote d'Ivoire Telecom			
MTN Group Cote d'Ivoire			
National Agency for Universal Service Telecommunications	2013	In 2013, Huawei began building a 6,700 km national fibre network on behalf of the government.	
Orange S.A. Cote d'Ivoire			

=== Democratic Republic of Congo ===
Operator	Started	Notes	Ref
Liquid Telecom			
Paratus Group	2022		

=== Djibouti ===
Operator	Started	Notes	Ref
Djibouti Telecom	2007	Government-run	
SEACOM			

=== Egypt ===
Operator	Started	Notes	Ref
Sudatel			
Telecom Egypt			

=== eSwatini ===
Operator	Started	Notes	Ref
MTN Group eSwatini			
Paratus			
Telecom			

=== Ethiopia ===
Operator	Started	Notes	Ref
Ethio telecom			

=== Gambia ===
Operator	Started	Notes	Ref
Gamtel	2010		

=== Ghana ===
Operator	Started	Notes	Ref
AirtelTigo	2017	Merger of Tigo and Bharti Airtel	
Expresso Telecom Ghana			
MTN Ghana			
National Communications Backbone Company		NCBC is a subsidiary of Vodafone Ghana.	
Orange S.A.			
Tigo		Merged with Bharti Airtel in 2017 to become AirtelTigo.	

=== Guinea ===
Operator	Started	Notes	Ref
Orange S.A.			

=== Kenya ===
Operator	Started	Notes	Ref
AccessKenya Group			
Airtel Kenya			
Jamii Telecom			
Kenya Data Networks			
Kenya Power			
National Optical Fibre Backbone Infrastructure			
Safaricom			
SEACOM			
Telkom Kenya			

=== Liberia ===
Operator	Started	Notes	Ref
Orange S.A.			

=== Madagascar ===
Operator	Started	Notes	Ref
Telecom Malagasy (Telma)			

=== Malawi ===
Operator	Started	Notes	Ref
Malawi Telecommunications		MTL appears to have completed its domestic fibre optic network in early 2012.	
Electricity Supply Corporation of Malawi			

=== Mali ===
Operator	Started	Notes	Ref
Gouvernement du Mali		In 2011, the Malian government announced a 942 km fibre optic cable project linking Bamako-Gao-Kidal-Tin-Zaoutière to the Algerian border and Gap-Ansongo-Labezanga to the border of Niger. The project was funded by a $45 million loan from the Exim Bank of China.	
Orange S.A.			
Sotelma/Malitel			

=== Mauritania ===
Operator	Started	Notes	Ref
Mauritel		In May 2011, Mauritel launched a fiber optic cable project linking the towns of Nouakchott and Kobonni.	

=== Morocco ===
Operator	Started	Notes	Ref
Maroc Telecom		60% of regional fibre network completed in 2010.	

=== Mozambique ===
Operator	Started	Notes	Ref
Telecomunicações de Moçambique			

=== Namibia ===
Operator	Started	Notes	Ref
NamPower			
Paratus Africa		Various fiber projects deployed since 2011. Full FTTx deployment in various towns. Cross-country backhaul fiber from WACS (West Africa Cable Landing Station) through Namibia connecting various land-locked countries around Namibia.	
Telecom Namibia			

=== Niger ===
Operator	Started	Notes	Ref
SONITEL			

=== Nigeria ===
Operator	Started	Notes	Ref
21st Century Technology			
Globacom			
MTN Group Nigeria			
Multi-Links		Purchased by Helios in 2011; at this time, Multi-Links had a terrestrial fibre optic network spanning 8,232 km in Nigeria.	
NITEL			
Orange S.A.			
Phase3 Telecom		In 2011, Phase3 were building the West Africa One network, an aerial optic fibre transmission system which runs from Nigeria to Benin and Togo.	
Suburban Telecoms			Backbone Connectivity Network (Nig) Limited has built over 5,000 km of fiber optic networks in Northern Nigeria, comprising metropolitan fiber networks and long distance backbone networks especially in Abuja and North West Nigeria. it is the largest broadband connectivity operator providing high capacity internet services, data transmission services and solutions and access to all the data centres in Nigeria. it is currently expanding its footprint to cover the whole country. lt

=== Rwanda ===
Operator	Started	Notes	Ref
Green Future	2009		
MTN Group Rwanda			
Rwanda Development Board		The physical deployment of the RDB's network was completed in January 2011.	
Rwandatel			
SEACOM		Partnered with KT Corporation	

=== Senegal ===
Operator	Started	Notes	Ref
Orange S.A.			
Sonatel			

=== Somalia ===
Operator	Started	Notes	Ref
Hormuud Telecom/Liquid Telecom	2013		
SEACOM			
SomCable		Licensed with 25 years of exclusivity for Metro and Backbone fiber optic infrastructure building.	

=== South Africa ===
Operator	Started	Notes	Ref
Broadband Infraco		Broadband Infraco is a South African State Owned Entity (SOE) that is intended to participate in those segments of the telecommunications market and value chain that impede private sector development and innovation in telecoms services and content offerings. Broadband Infraco maintains a national long distance fibre optic network, providing high capacity telecommunication services between all major national metropolitan centres and being expanded to enable connectivity to reach smaller cities and rural areas.	
BWired		Announced in August 2011, BWired invested $600 million in regional fibre infrastructure.	
Dark Fibre Africa		Community Investment Ventures (CIV) and VenFin are the principal shareholders in DFA. ABSA Capital, who are a stakeholder in CIV via New GX Capital Holdings, also backs CIV. Shareholders in Dark Fibre Africa have granted the necessary approvals to adequately capitalize the company for the construction of a nationwide Dark Fibre Infrastructure. This funding exceeded R2Bn by 2013.	
Fibreco	2012	Established in 2009 as an equal partnership between CellC, Internet Solutions and Convergence Partners.	
Neotel			
NLD Consortium		A consortium made up of Neotel, MTN Group, and Vodacom deployed a national fibre network in South Africa in 2012.	
Passenger Rail Agency of South Africa		In 2013, PRASA announced plans to lease excess fibre capacity.	
Telkom		Telkom is the dominant operator and has the largest fibre network in South Africa, covering approximately 143,000 km as per the 2011 annual report.	

=== South Sudan ===
Operator	Started	Notes	Ref
South Sudanese Government	2013		
SEACOM			

=== Sudan ===
Operator	Started	Notes	Ref
Sudatel			

=== Tanzania ===
Operator	Started	Notes	Ref
Consortium		A consortium of TIGO, Zantel, Vodacom, and Airtel.	
CTV		Fiber to the building, mainly in Dar es Salaam.	
National Information & Communication Technology Broadband Backbone (NICTBB)	2010	Funded by a soft loan from the Chinese government, the NICTBB is being built by the Tanzanian government and will be operated by the Tanzania Telecommunications Corporation	
Raha/Liquid Telecom		Metro fiber - Dar es Salaam.	
SEACOM			
SimbaNET		Metro fiber - Dar es Salaam.	
TANESCO			

=== Togo ===
Operator	Started	Notes	Ref
Phase3 Telecom	2009		
Togo Telecom			

=== Uganda ===
Operator	Started	Notes	Ref
Ministry of Information and Communications Technology/National Information Technology Authority-Uganda			
SEACOM	2009		
Uganda Telecom			

=== Zambia ===
Operator	Started	Notes	Ref
Copperbelt Energy Corporation (CEC)	2008		
Zambia Telecommunications			
ZESCO			

=== Zimbabwe ===
Operator	Started	Notes	Ref
Africom			
Dark Fibre Africa	2019		
Liquid Telecom			
Powertel			
Telecel Zimbabwe	2014		
TelOne	2010	Built with Chinese workers via Huawei.	

== Notes ==
This list was initially developed as part of AfTerFibre, a project to map terrestrial fibre optic cable projects in Africa. The project was sponsored by Google Africa and, on completion, will be hosted by the UbuntuNet Alliance. All information gathered by the project will be publicly available under an open license.

== See also ==
- List of international submarine communications cables
- National broadband plans from around the world
- Central African Backbone
- Kenya Data Networks
- Telecommunications in Namibia
- Internet in Ethiopia
- People's Republic of China – Ghana relations
- Wireless Internet service provider
- Telecommunications in Rwanda
