= U-COM Burundi =

- Trade name: LEO
- Industry: Telecommunications
- Founded: 1985; 41 years ago
- Headquarters: Bujumbura, Burundi
- Onatel headquarters in Bujumbura (Burundi)

U-COM Burundi, operating as LEO, was a wireless telephone company in Burundi, a subsidiary of VimpelCom. It was purchased by Econet Wireless in 2014 and merged with Econet Wireless Burundi to form Econet Leo.

== History ==
U-Com Burundi was owned by Orascom Telecom Holding, a subsidiary of Vimpelcom group. It was founded in 1985 and started an AMPS 800 mobile network in Burundi in September 1993. LEO started to provide voice services in 1993 and data services in 2007. U-Com Burundi was awarded a GSM license in 1999, and launched GSM services in February 2000.

After Burundi became a member of the East African Community in 2007, the landline incumbent Onatel Burundi formed a consortium with other Burundian telecommunications companies including Africell, U-COM Burundi, CBINET and Econet Wireless to build the Burundi Backbone System (BBS) fiber optic network.

As of Q3 2011 LEO had over 56% of the Burundi mobile market, with 1,132,000 subscribers. It had 245 telecom sites, including off-grid and on-grid sites. Since power was unreliable, both types of site had diesel generators.

In October 2014 Econet Wireless Group, owned by Strive Masiyiwa of Zambia, bought U-Com Leo for US$65 million. On 7 July 2015 the merger with Econet Wireless Burundi was completed, forming Econet Leo. The combined operator had 2.6 million customers and 242 direct employees. Competitors included Lumitel (Viettel), Smart and Tempo Africell.

== See also ==
- List of companies of Burundi
- Economy of Burundi

== Sources ==
- Burundi: Econet Wireless becomes Econet Leo, following buyout of U-Com, subsidiary of VimpelCom, Agence Ecofin, 9 July 2015
- Gahama, Pacifique (4 December 2020), "Qui a tué l'Onatel ?", Iwacu (in French)
- LEO (U-Com) – Burundi – Feasibility Study (PDF), GSMA Green Power for Mobile, 2011
