= Econet Wireless Burundi =

Wireless telephone company in Burundi

- Industry: Telecommunications
- Founded: 2009; 17 years ago
- Headquarters: Bujumbura, Burundi
- Econet Wireless headquarters in Bujumbura (Burundi)
- Website: www.econet.bi

Econet Wireless Burundi is a wireless telephone company in Burundi, a subsidiary of Econet Wireless.

== History ==
In May 2006 Econet Wireless acquired a controlling interest in ST Cellular S.A., formerly Spacetel Burundi, one of four operators in Burundi licensed to provide GSM service, and began a major network expansion program. It launched its services in March 2009.

As of 2010 Econet Wireless Burundi had over 80,000 subscribers, or 0.96% of the market. More than 32% of their sites were not connected to the electrical grid and relied on diesel generators. Even in areas where a grid connection was available, it was unreliable, with outages of 6 to 16 hours per day.

In 2010 the landline incumbent Onatel Burundi formed a consortium with other Burundian telecom companies including Africell, U-COM Burundi (LEO), CBINET and Econet Wireless to build the Burundi Backbone System (BBS) fiber optic network. In July 2011 Econet Wireless launched the first mobile broadband service in the country after investing over US$10 million in 3G technology. Initially the service was available only in Bujumbura.

In October 2014 Econet Wireless Group, owned by Strive Masiyiwa of Zambia, bought U-Com Leo for US$65 million. On 7 July 2015 the merger with Econet Wireless Burundi was completed, forming Econet Leo. The combined operator had 2.6 million customers and 242 direct employees. Competitors included Lumitel (Viettel), Smart and Tempo Africell.

Econet Wireless Burundi was the first in the country to roll out mobile financial services and to offer mobile data services. In mid-2023 it was the largest mobile operator in Burundi, with nearly 55% of the market. The company was upgrading its 3G network and rolling out 4G sites in large towns and cities, but did not see Burundi as being ready for 5G. Their focus was on mobile data.

== See also ==
- List of companies of Burundi
- Economy of Burundi

== Sources ==
- Ajao, Oluniyi D. (22 May 2006), Econet Wireless acquires controlling stake in St Cellular S.A. (ex Spacetel Burundi)
- "Burundi: Econet Unveils U.S. $ 10 Million 3G Network", East African Business Week, Kampala, 25 July 2011
- Burundi: Econet Wireless becomes Econet Leo, following buyout of U-Com, subsidiary of VimpelCom, Agence Ecofin, 9 July 2015
- Econet Wireless Burundi – Feasibility Study (PDF), GSMA, 2010
- Gahama, Pacifique (4 December 2020), "Qui a tué l'Onatel ?", Iwacu (in French)
- Gilbert, Paula (2023), "Interview: Econet Wireless Burundi CEO Nepias Njaravaza on growing mobile penetration", Connecting Africa
