= Icky =

Icky or Ickey may refer to:

- Icterine warbler
- Ickey Woods (born 1966), American football player

== See also ==
- Icky-pick
- Sticky icky
