= Lacell SU Burundi =

- Trade name: Smart
- Industry: Mobile telephony
- Founded: 2008; 17 years ago
- Defunct: 2022
- Headquarters: Bujumbura, Burundi

Lacell SU Burundi, trade name Smart Telecom Burundi, was a wireless telephone company in Burundi. It was closed in 2022 for failing to paid tax arrears.

== History ==
Smart Telecom Burundi (Lacell SU) was originally owned by the Russian-owned Timeturns Holdings of Cyprus. Later the Industrial Promotion Services (IPS) Kenya took a majority stake. IPS is a division of the Aga Khan Fund for Economic Development (AKFED). (Note: Some sources use the phrase "Lacell SU from Nepal". The original owner, Timeturns Holdings of Cyprus was created in 2007 and is involved in telecoms in developing countries as well as various enterprise in Russia and Belarus. As of 2011 it was owned by Alexander Milyavsky of Russia and Samatha Prasad of Nepal.) The general manager of Lacell SU Burundi was Bhupendra Bhandari.

Lacell SU obtained a license to provide mobile service in Burundi in 2008. In March 2010 the Telecom IT systems vendor CBOSS announced that it had completed deployment of the hardware and software for the mobile network for the "Smart Mobile" service of Lacell SU. The service included GSM-based voice calls and SMS throughout Burundi. The post-paid service was launched in May 2009 and the pre-paid service in July.

The company chose Ericsson to supply a new GSM network, including the core network, its associated radio network, and all installation, integration and training services. Smart Telecom Burundi launched its 3G service on 5 September 2014 in Bujumbura and its surroundings. The service included a variety of internet access packages.

In July 2015 mobile carriers in Burundi included Econet Leo, with 2.6 million customers, Lumitel (Viettel), Smart and Tempo Africell. In the first quarter of 2022 there were 7,798,885 telephone subscribers in Burundi, divided between the four carriers: Econet Leo, Lumitel, Smart and Onatel.

In August 2022 the Agence de Regulation et de Controle des Telecommunications (ARCT) shut down Smart for failing to pay US3.2 million of tax arrears, and for failing to confirm that it owed no taxes when it filed to have its license renewed. ACT granted a two-week grace period to pay all arrears, which expired at midnight on 19 August 2022. The general manager of Lacell SU stated in a letter of 19 August 2022 said it had paid all its tax arrears of 6.6 billion BIF as of 30 May 2022. He acknowledged that Smart had not paid additional invoices for more than 1.3 billion BIF issued in July and August 2022. Separately, the sales director claimed that the shut down order was made for political reasons, to benefit Lumitel, a subsidiary of Viettel.

== See also ==
- List of companies of Burundi
- Economy of Burundi

== Sources ==
- Burundi: Econet Wireless becomes Econet Leo, following buyout of U-Com, subsidiary of VimpelCom, Agence Ecofin, 9 July 2015
- "Burundi's U-com plans to double users by 2010", ITNA, 26 September 2008
- "CBOSS deploys network for Burundi startup", Telecom Asia, 18 March 2010
- Edjo, Muriel (2 September 2022), Burundi: following the closure of Smart by the authorities, the company denounces a desire “to harm it”, Agence Ecofin
- Kuriyo, Benjamin (22 August 2022), "Fermeture ou interruption du réseau mobile Smart ?", Burundi Eco (in French)
- Lacell SU Burundi choose Ericsson for new GSM network (PDF), Ericsson
- O'Grady, Vaughan (6 September 2022), "Operator Smart Burundi hits back after closure ordered", Developing Telecoms
- Smart Telecom Burundi launches SMART 3G network, 23 September 2014
- Timeturns Holdings, TAdviser
