= Cable compound =

Materials used to protect cables from moisture

Cable compounds are materials used to prevent the ingress of moisture into telecommunication and power transmission cables. The compound used varies depending upon the type of cable; generally, they are either soft waxy compounds (for use in copper-wire telecom cables), soft thixotropic gels with a consistency similar to that of hair gel (for use in optical fibre cables), or resin/polymer thickened oils (for use in paper insulated energy cables). A cable with such a compound is called a filled cable. Cable compounds are formulated and manufactured to have very good electrical resistance properties to ensure good functioning of the filled cable.

Icky-pick is a common gel-type compound used in outdoor fiber-optic cables.
