= Bay of Bengal Gateway =

BBG
- Cable type: Fibre-optic
- Construction beginning: May 2013; 13 years ago
- Construction finished: 2014; 12 years ago
- Design capacity: 55 Tbit/s (3 fibre pairs)
- Lit capacity: 10 Tbit/s
- Area served: Southeast Asia, South Asia, West Asia
- Owner(s): Consortium
- Website: bayofbengalgateway.com

The Bay of Bengal Gateway (BBG) is a submarine communications cable providing a direct trunk connection between Barka (Sultanate of Oman) and Penang (Malaysia) with four branches to Fujairah (UAE), Mumbai (India), Colombo (Sri Lanka) and Chennai (India). The project was carried out by a consortium that includes Vodafone, Omantel, Etisalat, AT&T, China Telecom, Telstra, Reliance Jio Infocomm, Dialog and Telekom Malaysia. Construction was started in May 2013 and was completed by the end of 2014. From Penang the system is connected via a terrestrial connection to Singapore. The length of the submarine Cable system is 5,934 kilometres (3,687 mi) from Barka to Penang, with a 216 km (134 mi) branch to Fujairah, 426 km (265 mi) branch to Mumbai, 142 km (88 mi) branch to Colombo and a 1,322 km (821 mi) branch to Chennai, totalling a total length of 8,040 km (5,000 mi).

The BBG Cable system creates a high-speed bridge between Europe, Middle East, Central Asia, and the Far East, with Singapore being a major cable hub with connection into the Far East and Barka in Oman with submarine and terrestrial connections to Europe, Africa and the GCC.

== Landing points ==
It has the following landing points:

1. Barka (Sultanate of Oman)
2. Penang (Malaysia)
3. Fujairah (UAE)
4. Mumbai (India)
5. Mount Lavinia (Sri Lanka)
6. Chennai (India)

From Penang the system is connected via a terrestrial connection to Singapore.

== Countries linked ==
- Sultanate of Oman
- United Arab Emirates
- India
- Sri Lanka
- Malaysia
- Singapore

== See also ==
- List of international submarine communications cables
- Other submarine cables used to cross-connect with BBG
  - EIG
  - EPEG
  - FALCON
