= CBINET =

Internet access provider in Burundi

- Native name: Centre Burundais de l'Internet
- Industry: Internet access
- Founded: 1999; 26 years ago
- Headquarters: Bujumbura, Burundi
- CBINET headquarters in Bujumbura (Burundi)
- Website: cbinet.net

CBINET (French: Centre Burundais de l'Internet) is an internet access provider in Burundi.

== History ==
CBINET was founded in 1999. In addition to internet access it provides interconnection services (MPLS or VPN), network installation (wired or wireless), VSAT installation and maintenance, server installation, website hosting, domain name registration, provision of public IP addresses, etc.

In January 2007 Pierre Nkurunziza, President of Burundi, announced a decision to erase debts owed to the state by media companies. The Centre Burundais de l'Internet (CBINET) owed 107 million BIF to the state, which was forgiven.

In 2010 Onatel Burundi formed a consortium with other Burundian telecommunications companies including Africell, U-COM Burundi, CBINET and Econet Wireless to build the Burundi Backbone System (BBS) fiber optic network. Decree No100/44 of 7 March 2015 granted CBINET a license to establish and exploit an internet network in Burundi.

== See also ==
- List of companies of Burundi
- Economy of Burundi

== Sources ==
- "Burundi : bouffée d'oxygène inespérée pour les médias", Panapress (in French), 2 January 2007
- Decret n°100/44/ du 7 Mars 2015 portant octroi d'une licence d'etablissement et d'exploitation d'un reseau internet a la societe CBINET (PDF) (in French)
- Gahama, Pacifique (4 December 2020), "Qui a tué l'Onatel ?", Iwacu (in French)
- Qui Sommes Nous ? (in French), CBINET
