= Icky-pick =

Gelatinous cable compound

Icky-pick or icky-pic is a gelatinous cable compound used in outdoor-rated communications cables, including both twisted-pair copper cabling and fiber-optic cabling. "PIC" is the abbreviation for "plastic insulated cable". The cable is filled with an "icky" substance. The filled cable itself, therefore, is called an "icky PIC".

Icky-pick has two primary functions:

- Deter animals from biting and damaging the cable due to the smell and taste of the gel
- Seal any nick or gash in the outer jacket if they do bite it, preventing water from entering the cable and damaging it by corrosion and freeze expansion

The actual icky-pick compound is a very thick petroleum-based substance e.g. petroleum jelly, and is only rated for outdoor use, frequently direct-buried in the ground. An outdoor cable spliced onto an indoor terminal block is prone to leak the gel, hence in many situations the icky-pic cable is spliced outside the building to a short run of normal cable which runs through a protective conduit into the building. The thick gel stains clothing and hands and is very difficult to remove.

When fiber-optic cables are to be spliced, the gel must be removed with solvents and swabs to prevent fouling of the splice. Paint thinner or charcoal starter is a frequently used and commonly available remover and clean-up agent.
