= Aerial insert =

Segment of cabling

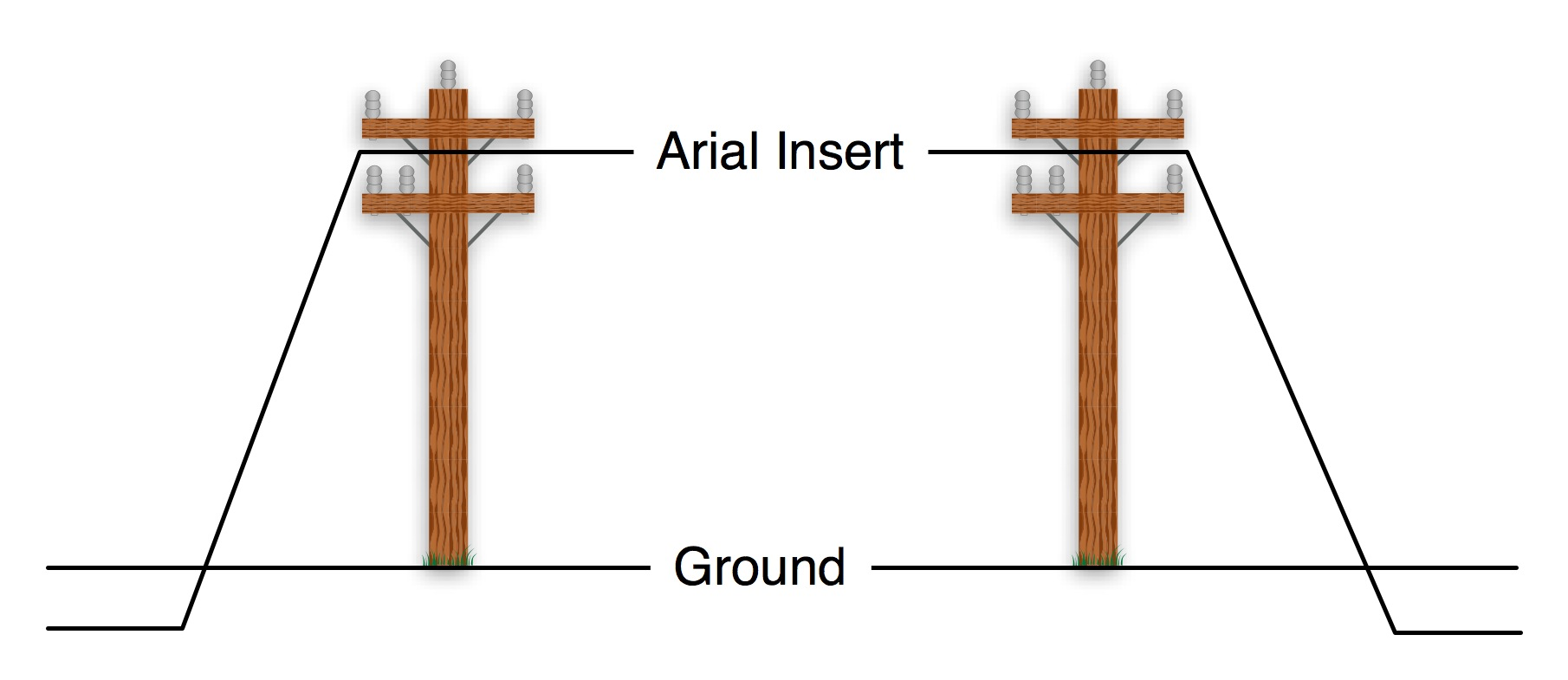

In telecommunications an aerial insert is a segment of cabling that rises from the ground to a point above ground, followed by an overhead run, e.g., on poles, followed by a drop back into the ground. An aerial insert is used in places where it is not possible or practical to place a cable underground. Aerial inserts might be encountered in crossing deep ditches, canals, rivers, or subway lines.

Aerial inserts can be found for the same reason also in underground power transmission lines. However, for this purpose, the aerial insert is in most cases realized as a classical overhead line. It is also possible that a powerline consists of multiple underground and overhead sections of different length.

== See also ==
- Aerial cable
