= Central African Backbone =

Internet backbone

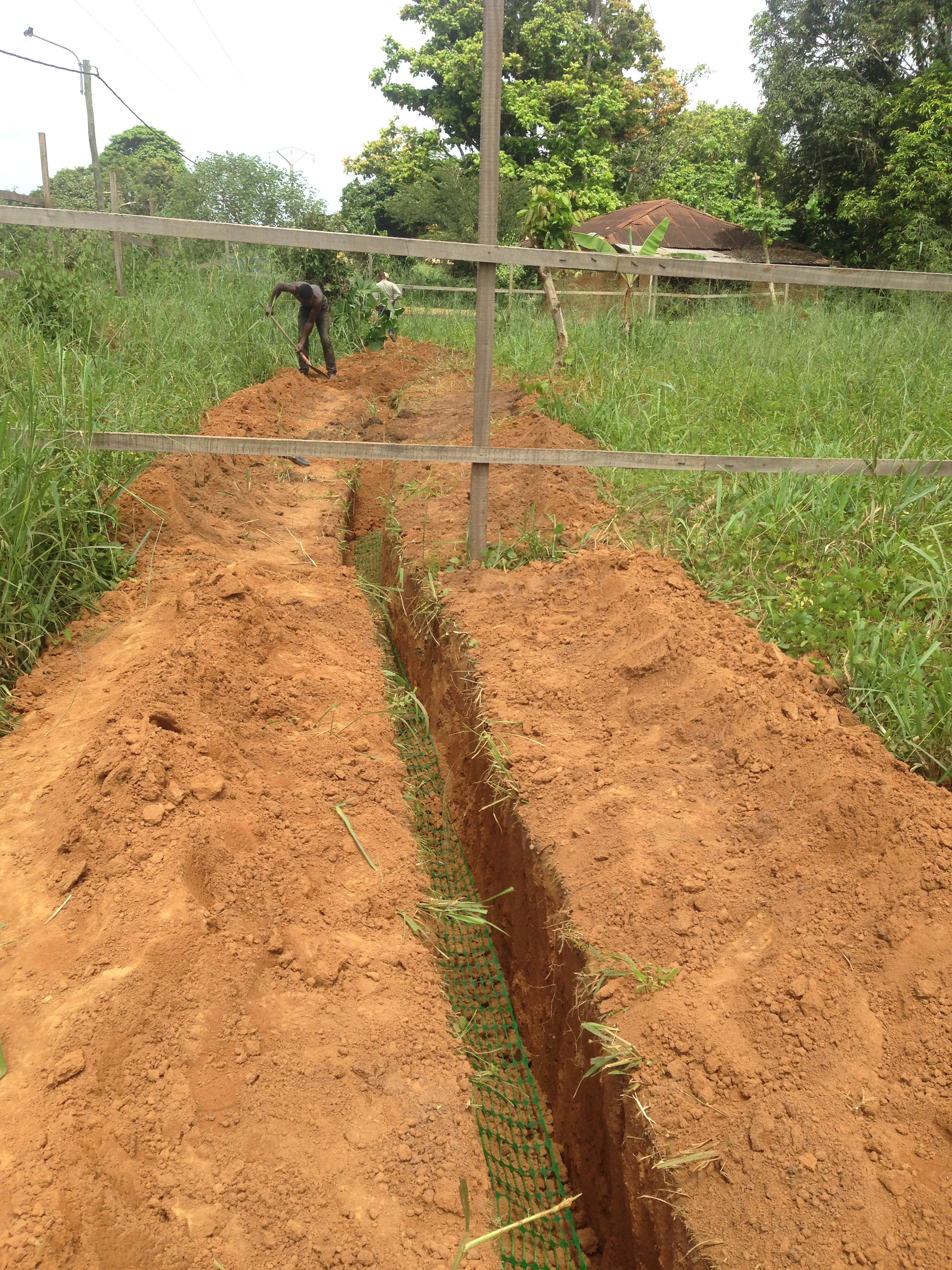
Fibre optic cables being dug into the ground in Ouesso in Northern Congo in 2015.

The Central African Backbone (CAB) is a fiber-optic Internet backbone connecting the countries of the Economic Community of Central African States (ECCAS) in Africa via high speed internet. The countries included in the CAB project are: Cameroon, the Central African Republic, Chad, Democratic Republic of the Congo, Gabon, Republic of the Congo and São Tomé and Príncipe. It's split up into five phases, each phase focusing on the fibre rollout in one or more countries.

== List of CAB phases ==
Phase	Reference	Countries	Approval Date	Closing Date	Status	Total Project Cost
Phase 1	APL1A	Cameroon; Central African Republic; Chad	24 September 2009	15 March 2016	Finished	US$26,730,000
Phase 2	APL2	São Tomé and Príncipe	20 January 2011	31 December 2014	Finished	US$14,900,000
Phase 3	APL3	Republic of the Congo	25 May 2011	29 October 2019	Finished	US$33,680,000
Phase 4	APL4	Gabon	28 March 2012	9 April 2021	Finished	US$132,000,000
Phase 5	SOP5	Democratic Republic of the Congo	16 July 2014	31 March 2022	Finished	US$38,093,000

== Funding ==
The project is funded by a loan from the World Bank, initially estimated at US$160 million. As of 2015, total World Bank funding for the project is at US$206 million, and the total project cost, including financing from other sources than the World Bank, is estimated at US$273 million.

== CAB in Cameroon ==
In Cameroon the CAB runs from the coast, through the capital of Yaoundé, to the north east where it meets up with the Chadian part of the backbone.

== CAB in Central African Republic ==
The deployment of the CAB in the Central African Republic was slowed down by the political instability in 2012-2013. It runs from Chad in the north to the capital of Bangui.

== CAB in Chad ==
In Chad the CAB runs from N'Djamena towards the south where it forks off in two directions, one towards Cameroon and one towards the Central African Republic.

== CAB in Democratic Republic of the Congo ==
In Democratic Republic of the Congo the CAB will run from Kinshasa to Lubumbashi and Kisangani.

== CAB in Gabon ==
In Gabon the CAB runs from Libreville to Franceville, and from thereon it splits in two directions, one towards Lékoni and another towards Koulamoutou.

== CAB in Republic of the Congo ==
In Republic of the Congo the CAB runs from the port city of Pointe-Noire to Brazzaville, and from thereon north to Ouesso.

== CAB in São Tomé and Príncipe ==
In São Tomé and Príncipe the CAB runs in the capital of São Tomé

== International terrestrial fibre interconnection ==
The CAB crosses several international borders, including a Cameroon-Chad interconnection, a Chad-CAR interconnection, a Congo-DRC interconnection between Brazzaville and Kinshasa, as well as a Congo-Gabon interconnection between running from Dolisie along the Congo–Ocean Railway, and through Mont-Mbelo, Makabana, Mossendjo and Mbinda, before crossing over into Gabon.

== See also ==
- List of terrestrial fibre optic cable projects in Africa
