= Stanley Jegede =

Nigerian entrepreneur

- Education: University of North London, United Kingdom; Middlesex University, United Kingdom
- Occupations: Executive Chairman, Phase3 Telecom; Executive Chairman, Stanley Jegede Foundation (SJF) Chairman, Cradle 2 Crayon & Springhall British Schools
- Years active: 1997–present
- Notable work: SJF Education Development Program (EDP)
- Spouse: Mosunmola Jegede
- Children: 3
- Parents: Samuel Adekunle Jegede (father); Victoria Olubukola Jegede (deceased) (mother)

Stanley Jegede is a Nigerian entrepreneur, businessman and philanthropist. He is a Nigerian telecom entrepreneur, digital infrastructure leader, and Executive Chairman of Phase3 Telecom, a leading fiber-optic network provider in West Africa. He is considered one of the individuals who transformed the Nigerian telecommunications space, in almost two decades. He co-founded Phase3 Telecom, a firm licensed as National Long Distance Operator (NLDO) by the Nigerian Communications Commission (NCC) in 2003. And he was instrumental in building the company from a local firm to one of West Africa's prominent digital infrastructure and, connectivity networks with an optic-fiber over power lines model. He is currently Executive Chairman at Phase3 Telecom

== Early life ==
Jegede was born to Samuel and Victoria Jegede in Zaria, a city (one of the original seven Hausa city-states), situated in Nigeria's Northern territory and home to the Zazzau Emirate and Ahmadu Bello University which is Nigeria's largest government owned tertiary institution. He grew up as a middle child with both older and younger siblings under what he described as "firm but loving parents". He always credited his power of determination and strength of purpose to his mother and father's classroom of discipline, warmth, wisdom, and faithful instructions.

== Education ==
Jegede obtained a B.Sc. (honours) in business information systems from the University of North London in 1995 and M.Sc in business information technology from Middlesex University, in 1996.

== Career ==
Prior to his business forays into the education and technology sectors, he worked as a Business Analyst in the United Kingdom between 1997 and 1999. He joined Verizon Communications (Formerly Bell Atlantic) USA, in 1999 as a Senior Business Analyst exiting in 2002 to launch a telecommunications company in Abuja, Nigeria. Jegede is also a member of Gas Hub's board and is the chairman of Springhall British Schools

== Phase3 Telecom (Technologies) ==
In 2003, Jegede helped found Phase3 Telecom, a firm licensed to offer national long-distance transmission services using fiber optic, initially within the territory of Nigeria. Between 2014 and 2022, Phase 3 added two more subsidiaries - Coverage Broadband and P3Tech to venture into the enterprise business and technologies spaces. Jegede was appointed as a member of the Broadband Committee inaugurated by President Goodluck Jonathan. Phase 3 was awarded the International Arch of Europe award for Quality, a vanity award as well as the Best Infrastructure Service Provider Award 2012, in the Africa-America International Business Awards.

== Philanthropy ==
In 2014, he launched the Stanley Jegede Foundation, a non-governmental organization solely set up to join local and global efforts in eradicating social and economic challenges facing Nigeria's local communities and indeed a larger part of the African continent. Through projects that center on education, health, welfare, emergency relief, art heritage, and international/group support initiatives that run on frameworks with enhanced technological innovation and initiatives. Education is considered the key platform as well as the driving force that is capable of engineering and sustaining the desired affluence for Africa and its people. And in 2016, the foundation ran its Education Development Program (EDP) in two northern states through advocacy, scholarships, mentor programs; donor/funding initiatives, and infrastructure projects.
