= Onatel Burundi =

- Trade name: ONATEL
- Native name: Office National des télécommunications du Burundi
- Industry: Telecommunications
- Founded: 1978; 48 years ago
- Headquarters: 1 Avenue du commerce, Bujumbura, Burundi
- Key people: Sixte Niyuhire, CEO
- Onatel headquarters in Bujumbura (Burundi)
- Website: https://onatel.bi/

Onatel Burundi (French: Office National des télécommunications du Burundi), is a state-owned telecommunications provider in Burundi. It provides the full range of services including fixed and mobile voice, broadband and internet. The company has struggled to compete with private internet, broadband and mobile operators for many years.

== History ==
=== Early years (1979–2003) ===
Onatel was created by decree No. 100/146 of 8 November 1979. It is a public industrial and commercial establishment with legal personality, supervised by the Ministry of Communication, Information Technology and Media. The International Development Association provided a loan of US$7,700,000 to cover start-up costs including buildings, equipment and vehicles.

Onatel was the only telecommunications company in Burundi, and at first only supported landline telephones. In the 1990s Onatel partnered with Télécel Zaire to form Télécel Burundi, providing the first mobile service in Burundi. Start-up capital of US$1 million was used to buy second-hand equipment. The venture did not generate dividends until 2003. In 2003 Onatel cut the link with Télécel Zaïre, receiving 460 million BIF in compensation. Eventually Télécel Burundi became the mobile telephony operator Onamob.

By Decree-Law No. 01/011 of 4 September 1997 the government liberalized the telecommunications sector. It then restructured Onatel so that it could compete. Onatel steadily lost market share to the start-ups. Between 2003 and 2004 Onatel tried to negotiate a loan from South African companies, but wound up losing a US$600,000 deposit without any return.

=== Network expansion (2003–2015) ===
Onatel began providing internet access in 2003, data transmission in 2004 and mobile telephony in 2005. Onatel invested US$550,000 in West Indian Ocean Cable Company (WIOOC) in 2007, and $US350,151 in the Regional African Satellite Communication Organization (RASCOM) in 2007. Between February 2009 and May 2013 Onatel purchased satellite internet from the MBI and EMC companies for $US96,000 per month.

In 2009 Onatel was able to pay 3 billion BIF to the state. However, it did not have the capital to upgrade its equipment, which was obsolete compared to that of its competitors. The government began considering selling Onatel in 2009 and issued a report on the subject on 2012, but did not follow through. Viettel of Vietnam established a subsidiary in Burundi in 2010, which was exempted from taxes for 20 years.

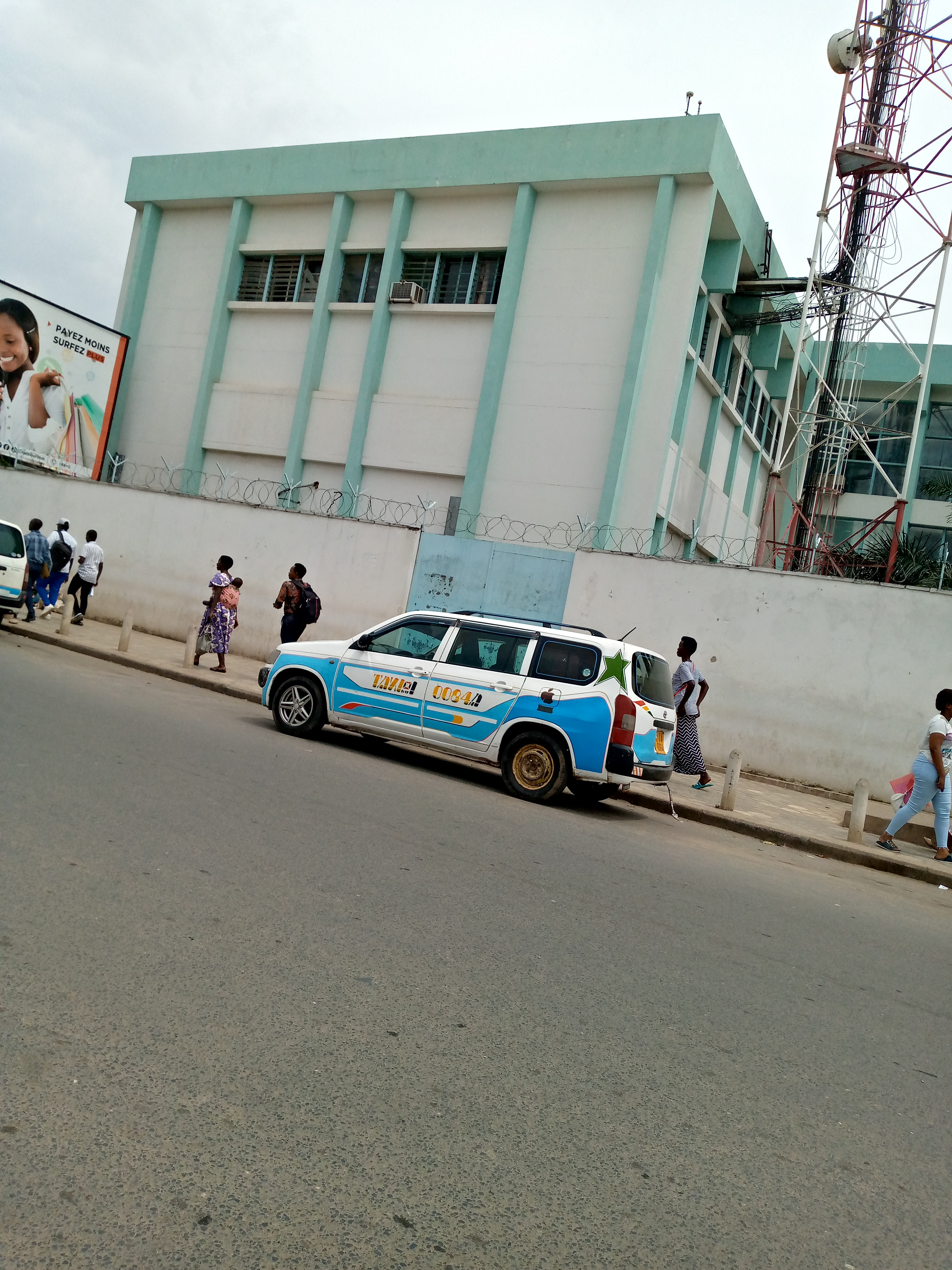
Headquarters of Onatel in Bujumbura

In 2010, Onatel formed a consortium with other Burundian telecommunications companies including Africell, U-COM Burundi, CBINET and Econet Wireless to build the Burundi Backbone System (BBS) fiber optic network. Onatel contributed US$800,000 capital to this project in 2011.

In March 2011 Pierre Nkurunziza, President of Burundi and Hamadoun Touré, ITU Secretary General, officially launched broadband wireless network services in Burundi. The service was based on three sites in Bujumbura and one in each of Ngozi, Bururi, Mwaro, Gitega and Muramvya.

In October 2014 the government of Burundi, Onatel and Huawei officially launched the Bujumbura Metropolitan Area Network (MAN) projects. The project was funded by a grant from China and would be installed by Huawei Technologies. The US$9 million Metropolitan Area Network (MAN) was not profitable due to competition from the BBS company.

=== Financial difficulties (2015–present) ===
In September 2015 Nestor Bankumukunzi, Minister of Posts, Information Technologies, Communication and Media, visited Onatel. He deplored the run-down condition of the company's equipment, which was due to lack of investment, in turn due to failure of Onatel to generate profits. To make the company attractive to Burundians it would have to be recapitalized and given new management, policies, services and equipment. In 2017 Onatel borrowed 30 billion BIF. China's Huawei provided the loan. It was needed to upgrade the mobile service, Onamob.

As of 2020 Onatel had about 14,000 fixed line customers and 250,000 mobile customers. A December 2020 report said that Onatel had been losing money since 2009. Turnover had dropped from 10 billion BIF in 2015 to 5 billion BIF in 2020. Alain Guillaume Bunyoni, Prime Minister of Burundi, blamed poor management and the inability of staff to adapt to competition and new technology.

The company had 530 employees in 2001, rising to a peak of 702 employees in 2009. The number of employees was 560 in 2017. No new hires were made between 2017 and 2022. Onatel had 462 employees in 2020. The number of employees was down to 390 in 2022 due to retirements, deaths and resignations.

In September 2021 the president of Burundi, Evariste Ndayishimiye, attacked the staff of Onatel for causing the collapse of the company According to Gabriel Rufyiri, president of Olucome, the blame rests with the state, who appointed the Onatel director general, departmental directors, and board of directors, and with the supervisory ministry. Other companies wholly or partially owned by the state were also reporting negative results, including Hôtel Source du Nil, Cogerco, Tanganyika Mining Burundi, Regideso, Socabu and Sodeco.

=== Recovery plans ===
In an interview on 5 January 2022, Privat Kabeba, general manager of Onatel, said the government was developing a roadmap for Onatel. Projects included the expansion of the metropolitan fiber optic networks in Bujumbura, Ngozi and Gitega, and later in all cities and communes in the country. Nothing had been spent on the fixed line network for ten years, and some equipment had broken down, but Onatel planned to repair it and then start adding new subscribers. They also wanted Onatel to have a money transfer platform.

The company was heavily indebted. There were plans to sell obsolete real estate owned by the company, as well as shares in BANCOBU and Banque Burundaise pour le Commerce et l'Investissement (BBCI) to obtain money to pay salary arrears. As of 2023 Onatel was one of four main mobile operators in Burundi, the others being Econet Leo, Lumitel (Viettel) and Smart Burundi. As of Q1 2022 these operators shared 7,798,885 subscribers in total.

== See also ==
- List of companies of Burundi
- Economy of Burundi

== Sources ==
- "Burundi: Huawei, Onatel Commission Bujumbura's Metropolitan Area Network in Burundi", CIO Africa, Nairobi, 30 October 2014
- Burundi, ITU, 2011
- Burundi: Onatel in need of investments to remain active, Agence Ecofin, 18 September 2015
- Credit No. 1058 BU Project Agreement (Telecommunications Project), International Development Association, 1980
- Gahama, Pacifique (4 December 2020), "Qui a tué l'Onatel ?", Iwacu (in French)
- Manirakiza, Fabrice (14 September 2021), "ONATEL : une faillite à plusieurs facettes", Iwacu (in French)
- Niyongabo, Jean Marie Vianney (7 January 2022), "L'Onatel, pourra-t-il ressusciter un jour ?", Burundi Eco (in French)
- Zaffareen Khan (18 May 2023), "Little Appetite for 5G in Burundi with 4G/LTE Continuing Gaining Ground", Operator Watch
