= Direct-buried cable =

Ruggedized utility cable for direct burial

Cross-section of direct buried cable

Direct-buried cable (DBC) is a kind of communications or transmissions electrical cable which is specially designed to be buried under the ground without any other cover, sheath, or duct to protect it.

Most direct-buried cable is built to specific tolerances to heat, moisture, conductivity, and soil acidity. Unlike standard telecommunications and power cables, which have only a thin layer of insulation and a waterproof outer cover, DBC consists of multiple layers of heavy metallic-banded sheathing, reinforced by heavy rubber covers, shock-absorbing gel, wrapped thread-fortified waterproof tape, and stiffened by a heavy metal core.

DBC is preferable in some areas since it is more resistant to being the focus of lightning discharges.

Most telecommunications cable is coaxial or bundled fiber-optic cable. In the 20th century, much of it was filled cable of twisted pairs. Direct-buried cable is cheaper and easier to lay than other kinds of cable that require protection from the earth. However, DBC is also easily cut during digging or other excavations. As a result, most direct-buried cable is found on side roads, not main thoroughfares.

== Power ==
Some power cabling is also direct-buried. This kind of cabling must follow strict regulatory procedures regarding installation and backfilling. This is usually used for undergrounding in areas where overhead cabling is impractical or dangerous.

== See also ==
- Trench
- Undergrounding
- Utility tunnel
