= Burundi Backbone System =

- Trade name: BBS
- Type: Wholesale Broadband Telecommunications Company
- Industry: Telecommunications
- Founded: 2010; 16 years ago
- Founder: Consortium of local and international telecommunication companies
- Headquarters: 20 Boulevard Mwambutsa, Bujumbura, Burundi
- Key people: Diègue Nifasha, CEO
- BBS headquarters in Bujumbura (Burundi)
- Website: www.bbs.bi/fr//

Burundi Backbone System, or BBS, is a wholesale broadband telecommunications company in Burundi.

== Services ==
BBS specializes in design, construction and operation of very high speed networks. It supports the government network, and networks connecting universities, banks, and service providers. BBS provides:

- A guaranteed, secure, high-speed transmission service between its points of presence throughout Burundi, with support for STM-64 international traffic to Tanzania and Rwanda.
- A multi-destination IP transit service with built-in redundancy and fault tolerance for telecommunications carriers, Internet Service Providers (ISPs), Application Service Providers (ASPs), content players and others.
- Web hosting services.

As of 2017, the COMGOV government communication system linked 58 government institutions and the BERNet Burundi Education and Research Network linked 14 universities. 24 communes had access to broadband.

== Backbone system development ==
Burundi became a member of the East African Community in 2007. At this time, only 7% of the population had mobile telephones and internet services were via expensive satellite channels. It was important to gain a connection to the first open access submarine cable in the region, the Eastern Africa Submarine System (EASSy).

The landline incumbent Onatel Burundi formed a consortium with other Burundian telecommunications companies including Tempo Africell, U-COM Burundi, CBINET and Econet Wireless to build the Burundi Backbone System (BBS) fiber optic network. The Public Private Partnership arrangement creating Burundi Backbone System as a consortium was signed in May 2010.

The International Development Association gave a grant of US$20 million towards implementation. A Fiber Optic Network covering 1,245 kilometres (774 mi) was built. The network was launched in 2013. The project was completed in October 2014, 27 months behind the original schedule.

Eight operators had access to the BBS virtual landing station when the project closed. The price of broadband connections was well below the original estimate. Mobile phones prices dropped from 320 to 60 BIF per month, and internet access charges for a 256 km connection dropped from US$2,500 to US$300 at the baseline. 3,061,706 people, or 50% of the population, gained access to internet and telephone service.

== Later events ==
In October 2014 the government of Burundi, Onatel and Huawei officially launched the Bujumbura Metropolitan Area Network (MAN) projects. The project was funded by a grant from China and would be installed by Huawei Technologies. The US$9 million Metropolitan Area Network (MAN) was not profitable due to competition from the BBS company.

In January 2017 the authorities revoked BBS's status as a Public Private Partnership (PPP) and nationalized it without consultation or compensation. The reason given was that the shareholders were not respecting their infrastructure contractual terms. Later in January 2017 the general manager of the BBS said the company had not been nationalized, but the government had terminated the contract with the operators, who had not paid their debt to the BBS, and was reorganizing the company.

== See also ==
- List of companies of Burundi
- Economy of Burundi

== Sources ==
- "BBS - Burundi Backbone System", developmentaid.org
- "Burundi Backbone Systems : A National Network", Africa Outlook, 26 December 2017
- "Burundi Backbone System (BBS): Démenti à propos de sa nationalisation", Burundi Forum, 24 January 2017
- "Burundi: Huawei, Onatel Commission Bujumbura's Metropolitan Area Network in Burundi", CIO Africa, Nairobi, 30 October 2014
- Gahama, Pacifique (4 December 2020), "Qui a tué l'Onatel ?", Iwacu (in French)
- Hébergement des données et serveurs, BBS
- IP Transit Internet (in French), BBS
- Manirakiza, Fabrice (14 September 2021), "ONATEL : une faillite à plusieurs facettes", Iwacu (in French)
- Ranga Rajan Krishnamani (2016), Report Number : ICRR0021023 (PDF), Independent Evaluation Group (IEG)
- Transmission de Données (in French), BBS
