= Phase3 Telecom =

Nigerian Telecom Company

- Type: Private
- Industry: Telecommunications
- Founded: October 2003
- Headquarters: Abuja Nigeria
- Key people: Stanley Jegede (Chairman) Engr. Stephen Bello (Non-Executive Director) Dr Haroun Aliyu (Non-Executive Director) Mrs Mosunmola Jegede (Non-Executive Director) Air Commodore Babatunde Adekoya (Rtd.) (Non-Executive Director) Dr Glenn Prince-Abbi (Non-Executive Director)
- Services: Telecommunications, Broadband & Converged Services
- Website: www.phase3telecom.com

Phase 3 Telecom (or "Phase 3 Technologies") is an aerial fiber-optic network infrastructure provider, providing connectivity, network management, and data storage services to wholesale, enterprise, and retail customers across West Africa. The company was incorporated in 2003 and is headquartered in Abuja, Nigeria. Licensed by the Nigerian Communications Commission in 2006 - the company in 2014, 2018, and 2022, added more kilometers to its existing coverage area with footprint expansion of its backbone, enterprise network, and broadband services. Phase operates 6,000 kilometres (3,700 mi) and counting open-access aerial fiber-optic network. The company, for over two decades has been vital to growth in Africa's growing ICT market, implementing the Wire Nigeria Project—conceived by the Nigerian Communications Commission to help provide broadband communications access to rural communities. Phase 3 has a broad range of wholesale and enterprise clients including Glo, MTN, 9Mobile, Ntel, Airtel, Smile Communications, World Bank, Julius Berger, Unity Bank, etc. Some of the African countries where the company currently has partner operations include Nigeria, Benin, Togo, and the Republic of Niger.

== History ==
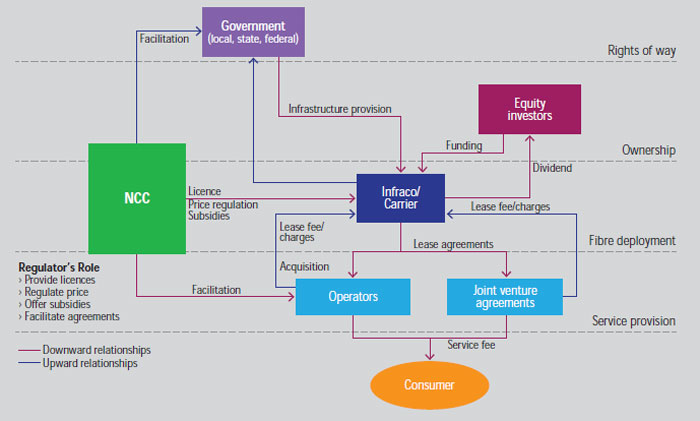
Nigerian Communications Commission (NCC) open access model for a fiber-optic network in Nigeria indica, ting key stakeholders, and their responsibilities as, well as the relationships between them.

Phase 3 was licensed in 2003, as a national long-distance operator and in 2006 entered into a major strategic Public–Private partnership to access powerlines to carry traffic for telecommunication operators. Phase 3 and Alheri Engineering were the two firms that beat 7 companies, including Siemens Nigeria, Suburban Telecom, NTL, Optic Networks Limited, and Backbone Company of Nigeria; to secure the deal. Such access to a telecommunications-enabled infrastructure was to make it possible for both companies (with Phase3 planned layout pegged for Nigeria's north and Alheri Engineering's for the west) to build out reliable fiber-optic backbone networks, to ensure faster broadband penetration and nationwide connectivity in the Nigeria unserved and under-served communities. Thus, making it possible for mobile operators, internet service providers, businesses, government agencies, and international organizations to take advantage of the huge bandwidth that is centrally managed. And, in March 2006, Phase 3 finalized a 15 Years agreement for the Design, Build, Finance, Operate (DBFO) Telecommunications Infrastructure model for the Western part of Nigeria". This largely positioned Phase 3 for expansive growth; the operational viability to run a layered range of telecoms, and value-added services as well as considerable access to foreign investment. More so, the company's capacity to offer non-discriminatory and non-competitive services to mobile operators became its distinctive factor as an open access network with unique right of way (RoW).

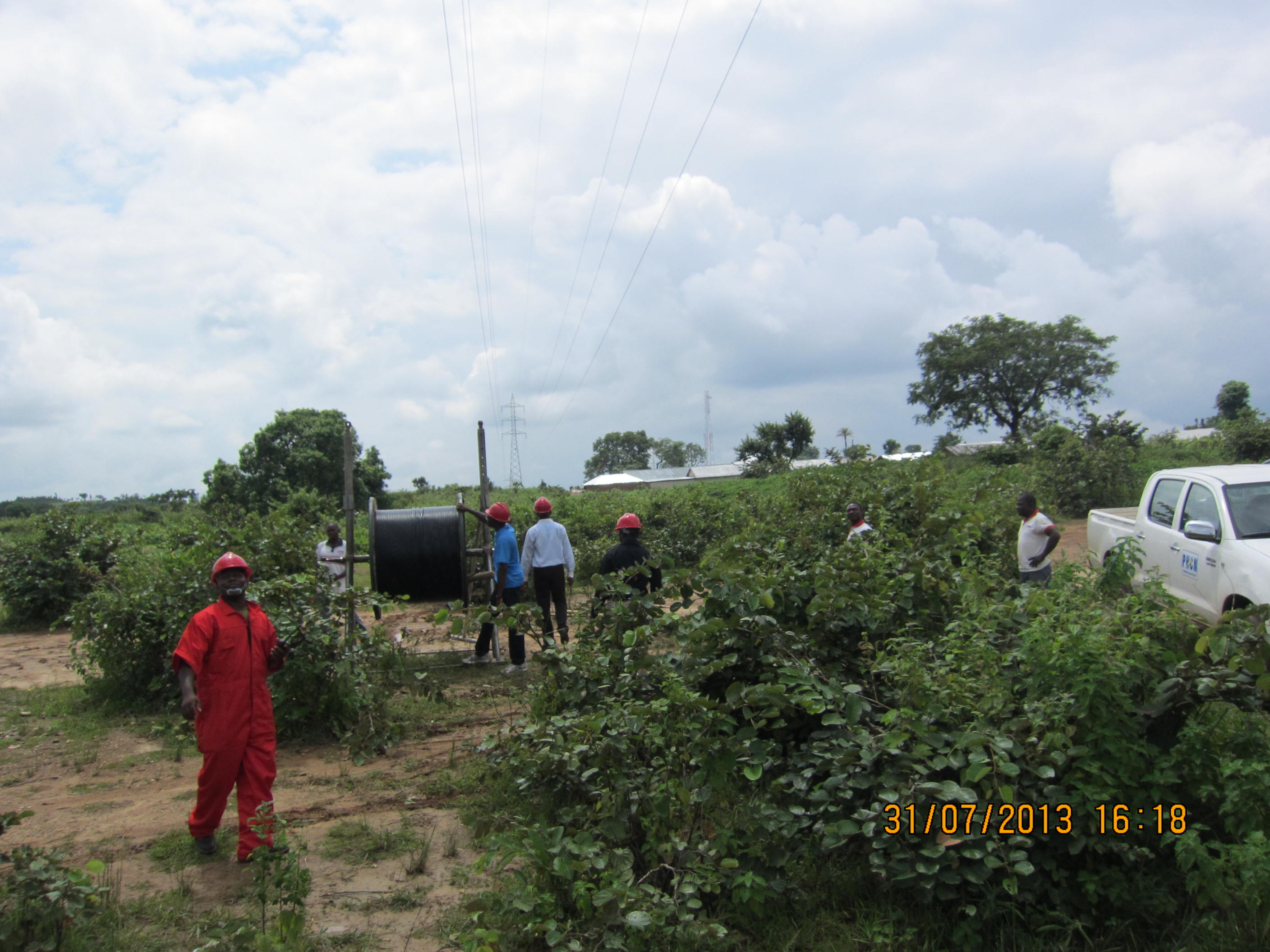
Phase3 engineering and project teams at a fiber maintenance exercise in Suleja, Niger State, Nigeria in July 2013

== Regional connectivity ==
=== 2009–2011 ===
In 2009, Phase 3 investments cull in the Nigerian telecommunications space hit US$100 million with fiber optic building projects centering on transmission services. Further expansion saw the commencement of the US$200 million cross-country optic fiber coverage project for carrier-grade international voice services to PSTN, GSM, and Pan-European calling card operators, as well as Tier 1 traffic Carriers to interconnect' riding on their international connectivity through SAT3 in Lagos, where a Gateway provides a link to their POP in London, thus giving it connectivity with over 370 carriers. In September of that year, the company signed an exclusive right of way Concession Agreement with the Communautéé Electrique du Benin (CEB), the authority responsible for the operation of High Voltage Power lines in both Benin and Togo Republics; a development that gained them the longest regional terrestrial fiber network linking Nigeria to the Republic of Benin and Togo, with potentials for connections to Ghana and Burkina Faso from Togo; making them about the first regional fiber optic cable network provider in West Africa to operate national fiber optic cable backbone interconnecting six (6) West African countries.

=== 2013–2015 ===
In March 2015, Phase3 Telecom announced that it would be deploying aerial fiber optic infrastructure from Kano in Nigeria to Gazaoua in the Republic of Niger on a project facilitated by the Universal Service Provision Fund (USPF) through the extension of the Backbone Transmission Infrastructure Program (BTRAIN) program to Niger under the authorization of Ministry of Communication Technology for the Federal Republic of Nigeria to deliver key infrastructure to connect the neighbours to the rest of the world and establish strong and sustainable partnerships across the sub-region. The network will be 228 km long and will allow Niger to leverage the bandwidth capacity available at the Nigerian coast, through Phase 3 telecom's aerial fiber network which is critical to the acceleration of sustainable socio-economic inclusion and growth for the Republic of Niger. Niger is a landlocked country that borders seven countries, namely Algeria, the Republic of Benin, Burkina Faso, Chad, Libya, Mali, and Nigeria. The lack of backbone infrastructure between the Republic of Niger and its neighbours leaves Niger unable to take full advantage of broadband. With one of the lowest internet penetration rates in West Africa at 1.7% in 2013, Niger will have the opportunity to use the large bandwidth capacity which is available at the Nigerian coast in Lagos through the Phase3 telecom aerial fiber network. This will also widen the market for under-sea cable owners in Nigeria thus enhancing the objectives of the Nigeria - Niger Joint Commission (NNJC) and the partnership between the two countries.

=== 2016–2020 ===
In 2016, Phase 3 commenced the first phase of network modifications with audit, maintenance, restoration, and upgrade activities carried out across the northern ring of the network - scoped for an 18-month implementation period. This it claims, will make the network more next-generation service capable for anticipated layered service scenarios that will come with it. The second phase took off in May 2019 and the third in October 2020, as the company further explored strategic Pan-Africa and international partnerships on digital infrastructure for a budding digital services ecosystem in Nigeria. With planned investments in evolving telecommunications technology including the FSOC model

== P3Tech Satellite Broadband ==
In 2021, Phase 3 with its subsidiary, P3Tech entered into a partnership with YahClick (powered by Hughes) on high-speed, low-latency satellite internet services in Nigeria. The key intent is to position as the connectivity infrastructure across unserved and underserved communities that are most affected considering the nation's digital divide index and the challenges of affordable internet access. The collaboration was piloted in the Northern geopolitical zone in 2022 and leveraged Phase 3's aerial fiber network to circumvent infrastructure deployment challenges limiting the people in the region's most remote areas from actively participating in the global digital economy. Considering, the Federal Government's goal of achieving 70% broadband penetration and 90% population coverage by 2025.

== Global partnerships ==
In the continuum of its network expansion map, Phase3 went into partnership with PCCW Global (the Hong Kong-headquartered international operating division of HKT, Hong Kong's premier telecom service provider) for regional connectivity provisioning that allows network access for businesses in multiple locations across West Africa
