= Africell Burundi =

Burundian mobile operator

- Trade name: Tempo Africell
- Native name: Africa Cellulaire
- Industry: Telecommunications
- Founded: 2000; 26 years ago
- Defunct: 2015
- Headquarters: Bujumbura, Burundi

Africell Burundi (Note: There is no connection between Africell Burundi and the Lebanon-based Africell Holding group, which in 2015 had operations in Gambia, Sierra Leone, Democratic Republic of Congo and Uganda.) (French: Africa Cellulaire) was a mobile operator running the Tempo / Africell Safaris network in Burundi.

== History ==
Africell was created around 2000 by Bernard Busokoza. (Note: Bernard Busokoza was an opposition MP and former First Vice President of Burundi.) The company obtained a GSM and WiMax license, and provided service under the network name of SAFARIS. In 2006 Africa Cellulaire received a term loan of US$1.569 million from the Eastern and Southern African Trade and Development Bank to partly finance expansion of its GSM network nationwide.

In January 2008 VTEL Holdings of Dubai completed its acquisition of Africell of Burundi. VTEL Holdings owned an 81% stake in the company. VTEL Holdings owned the Tempo and Africell Safaris brands. In 2010 Onatel Burundi formed a consortium with other Burundian telecommunications companies including Africell, U-COM Burundi, CBINET and Econet Wireless to build the Burundi Backbone System (BBS) fiber optic network.

Africell's GSM network operating license expired on 16 September 2014. On 1 October 2014 the Telecommunications Regulation and Control Agency (ARCT) asked Africell if it wanted to renew its license fo US$10 million. In a letter of 6 October 2014 Mehieddine Makkaoui, CEO of Tempo Africell, told ARCT that the licence would not be renewed and the company would close its GSM service due to "difficult economic and financial circumstances". There were rumours that Vtel was negotiating a partnership with Onatel Burundi.

Tempo Africell was closed on 16 March 2015 due to tax debt. Bernard Busokoza, founder and vice-president of the board of directors, asked for time to restructure. The Tempo Africell network continued to operate, but it was no longer possible to interconnect to other networks such as Econet, Lacell and Onatel. Customers were gradually moving to other networks.

== See also ==
- List of companies of Burundi
- Economy of Burundi

== Sources ==
- Annual Report 2006 (PDF), Eastern and Southern African Trade and Development Bank, 2006
- Burundi Telecoms, Mobile and Broadband Market, AMA Research & Media
- "Burundi: Tempo Africell closed due to tax debt", Agence Ecofin, 19 March 2015
- "Former Vice President Busokoza's Company Besieged by Police on Wednesday", Arib (in French), 18 March 2015
- Gahama, Pacifique (4 December 2020), "Qui a tué l'Onatel ?", Iwacu (in French)
- Kisambira, Edris (28 January 2008), "Burundi: VTEL Holdings Acquires Burundi's Africell", East African Business Week, Kampala
- Le groupe Africell Holding précise n'avoir aucun lien avec Tempo Africell au Burundi (in French), Agence Ecofin, 31 March 2015
- Madirisha, Edouard (19 November 2014), "Onatel, Africell, Vtel…Qui dit mieux ?", Iwacu (in French)
- "Tempo", Telcopedia
