= Underground power line =

Electrical power via underground cables

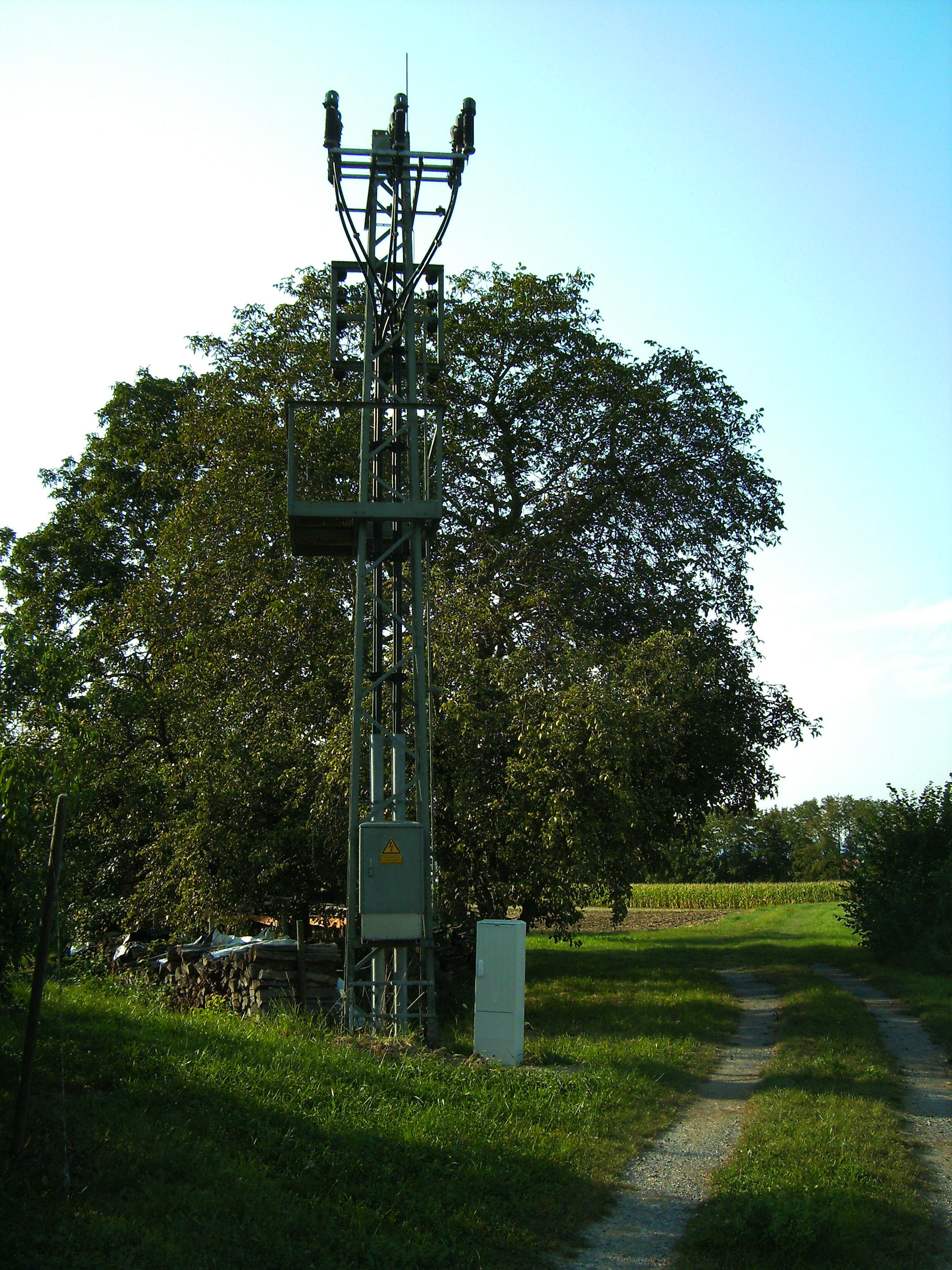
A former pylon transformer south of Markgröningen, Germany. Today, the pylon carries only a switch fed by two underground cables.

An underground power line provides electrical power with underground cables. Compared to overhead power lines, underground lines have lower risk of starting a wildfire and reduce the risk of the electrical supply being interrupted by outages during high winds, thunderstorms or heavy snow or ice storms. An added benefit of undergrounding is the aesthetic quality of the landscape without the powerlines. Undergrounding can increase the capital cost of electric power transmission and distribution but may decrease operating costs over the lifetime of the cables.

== History ==
Early undergrounding had a basis in the detonation of mining explosives and in undersea telegraph cables. Electric cables were used in Russia to detonate mining explosives in 1812, and to carry telegraph signals across the English Channel in 1850.

With the spread of early electrical power systems, undergrounding began to increase as well. Thomas Edison used underground DC “street pipes” in his early electric power distribution networks; they were insulated first with jute in 1880, and progressed to rubber insulation in 1882.

Subsequent developments occurred in both insulation and fabrication techniques:

- 1925: Pressurized paper insulation used on cables
- 1930: PVC insulation used on cables
- 1942: Polyethylene insulation first used on cables
- 1962: Ethylene propylene rubber-insulated cables become commercially available
- 1963: Preformed cable accessories become available
- 1970s: Shrinkable cable accessories become available

During the 20th century direct-buried cable became commonplace.

== Comparison ==
Aerial cables that carry high-voltage electricity and are supported by large pylons are generally considered an unattractive feature of the countryside. Underground cables can transmit power across densely populated areas or areas where land is costly, environmentally sensitive, or aesthetically sensitive. Underground and underwater crossings may be a practical alternative to crossing rivers.

The capital costs of underground power lines are typically significantly higher than for a suspended line along the same route. As an example, in 2024 the Public Service Commission of Wisconsin determined that the installation cost of a 69-kilovolt underground costs $1.5 million per mile, compared to only $284,000 per mile for an equivalent above-ground line. As ratepayers ultimately bear these costs, utilities exercise discretion in selecting which lines to bury.

=== Advantages ===
- Less subject to damage from severe weather conditions (mainly lightning, hurricanes/cyclones/typhoons, tornados, other winds, and freezing)
- Decreased risk of fire. Overhead power lines can draw high fault currents from vegetation-to-conductor, conductor-to-conductor, or conductor-to-ground contact, which result in large, hot arcs.
- Reduced range of electromagnetic fields (EMF) emission, into the surrounding area. However, depending on the depth of the underground cable; greater EMF may be experienced on the surface. The electric current in the cable conductor produces a magnetic field, but the closer grouping of underground power cables reduces the resultant external magnetic field, and further magnetic shielding may be provided. See Electromagnetic radiation and health.
- Underground cables need a narrower surrounding strip of about 1–10 meters to install (up to 30 m for 400 kV cables during construction), whereas an overhead line requires a surrounding strip of about 20–200 meters wide to be kept permanently clear for safety, maintenance, and repair.
- Underground cables pose no hazard to low-flying aircraft or to wildlife.
- Underground cables have a much-reduced risk of damage caused by human activity such as theft, illegal connections, sabotage, and damage from accidents.
- Burying utility lines makes room for more large trees on sidewalks, for environmental benefits and increase of property values.

=== Disadvantages ===
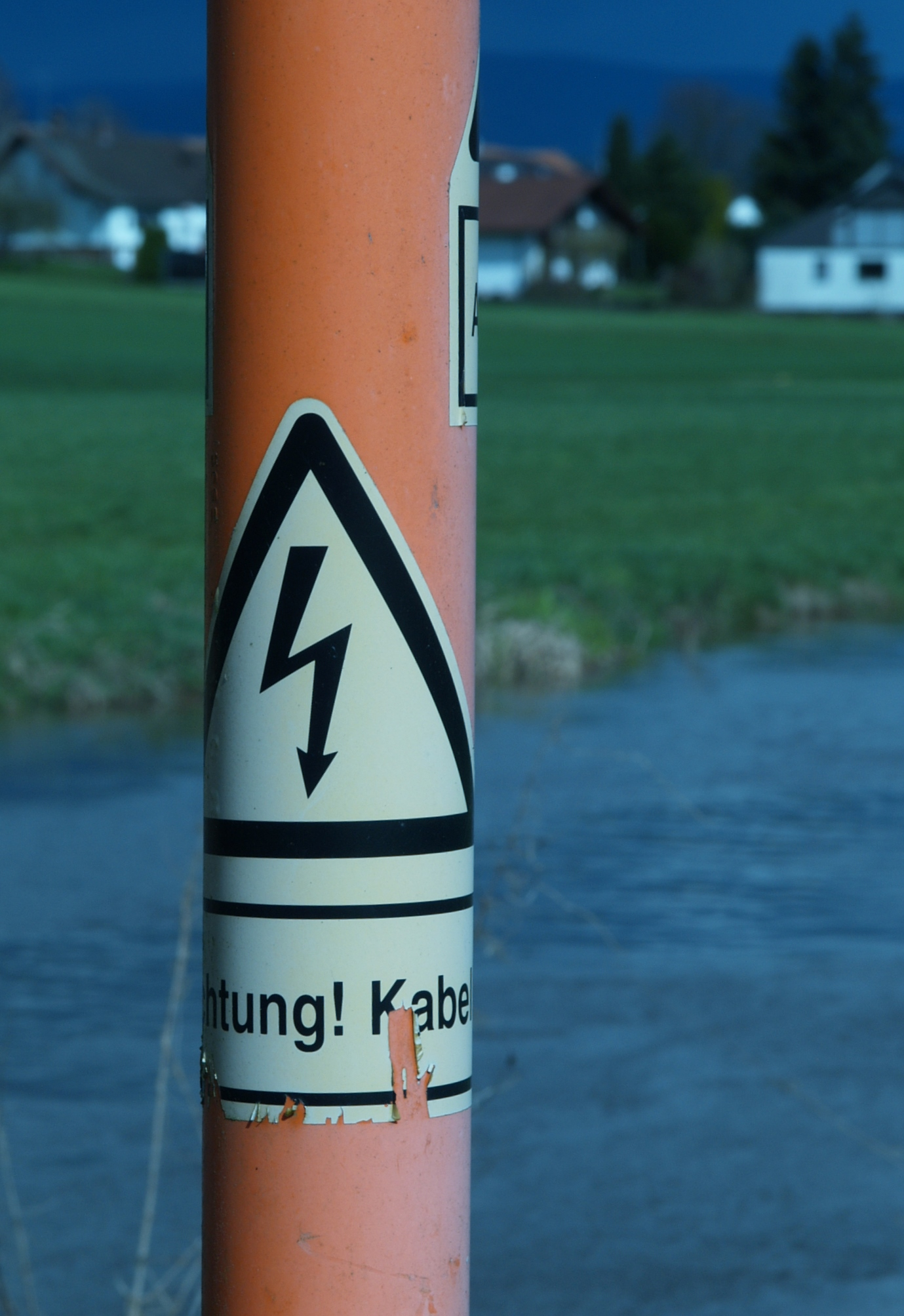
An underground cable marker. Markers are put at regular intervals to show the route and warn of the hazard of digging into the cable.

- Undergrounding is more expensive, since the cost of burying cables at transmission voltages is several times greater than overhead power lines, and the life-cycle cost of an underground power cable is two to four times the cost of an overhead power line. Above-ground lines cost around $10 per 1-foot (0.30 m) and underground lines cost in the range of $20 to $40 per 1-foot (0.30 m). In highly urbanized areas, the cost of underground transmission can be 10–14 times as expensive as overhead. However, these calculations may neglect the cost of power interruptions. The lifetime cost difference is smaller for lower-voltage distribution networks, in the range of 12–28% higher than overhead lines of equivalent voltage.
- Whereas finding and repairing overhead wire breaks can be accomplished in hours, underground repairs can take days or weeks, and for this reason redundant lines are run.
- Underground cable locations are not always obvious, which can lead to unwary diggers damaging cables or being electrocuted.
- Operations are more difficult since underground cables' high reactive power produces large charging currents, making voltage control more difficult. Large charging currents arise due to the higher capacitance from underground power lines and thus limit how long an AC line can be. To avoid capacitance issues when undergrounding long-distance transmission lines, HVDC lines can be used as they do not suffer from the same issue.
- Whereas overhead lines can easily be uprated by modifying line clearances and power poles to carry more power, underground cables cannot be uprated and must be supplemented or replaced to increase capacity. Transmission and distribution companies generally future-proof underground lines by installing the highest-rated cables while being still cost-effective.
- Underground cables are more subject to damage by ground movement. The 2011 Christchurch earthquake in New Zealand caused damage to 360 kilometres (220 mi) of high voltage underground cables and subsequently cut power to large parts of Christchurch city, whereas only a few kilometres of overhead lines were damaged, largely due to pole foundations being compromised by liquefaction.
- As underground repair and check-ups require street digging, they create patches and potholes, leading to bumpy and unsafe rides for cars and bicycles. Utility work also increases lane closure, which leads to traffic jams and increases the cost of resurfacing work by the local government.

== Methods ==
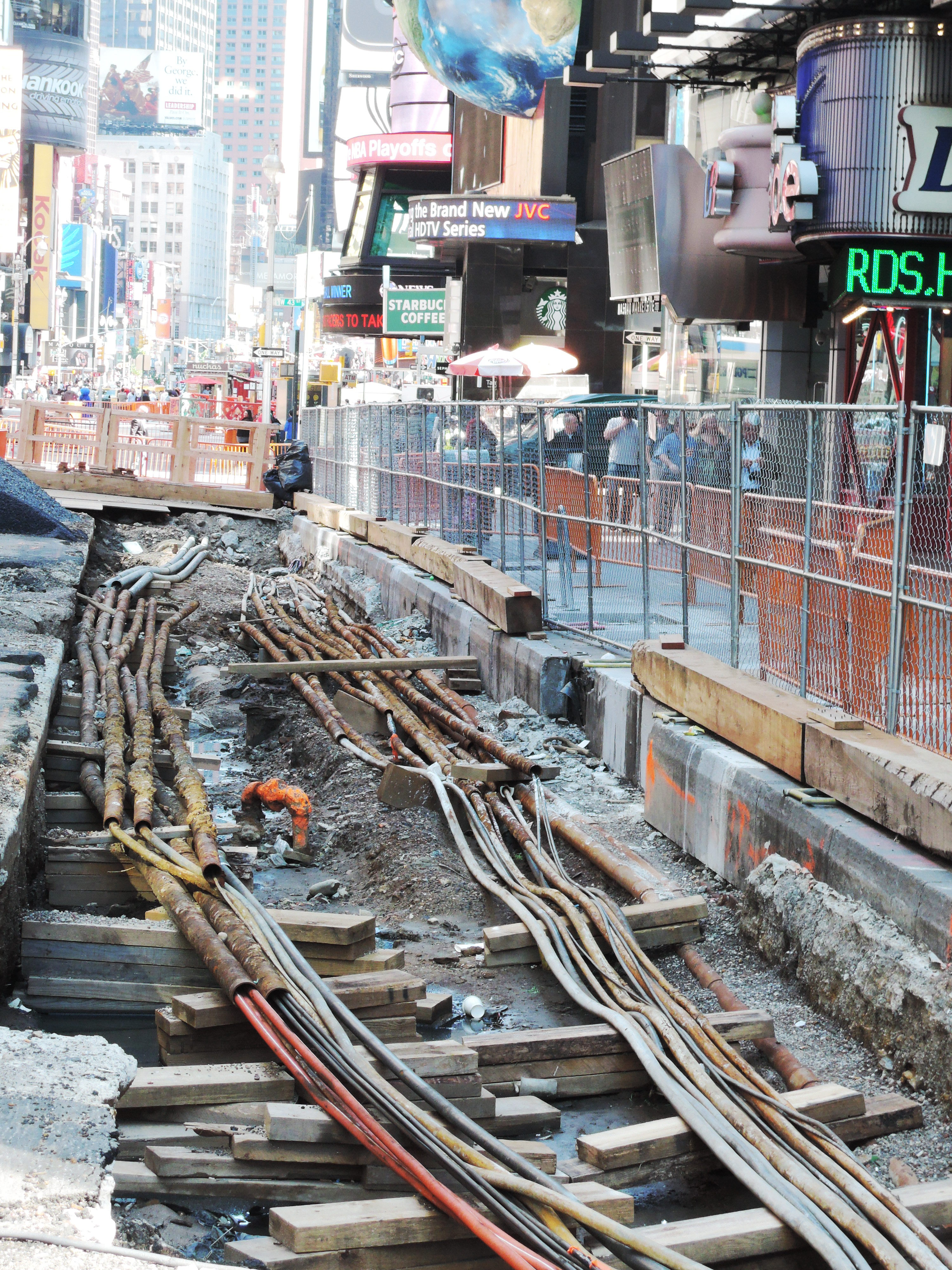
Cables under Broadway in 2013

- Horizontal Boring - This is a method in which one uses a drill bit to bore horizontal starting at one point on the surface of the ground and creating an arc underground to come back out of the surface. This method is used when minimal damage to the surface is preferred.
- Trench Undergrounding - Another method for undergrounding power lines is to dig trenches, lay power lines into the trench and cover them back up. This is done for the length of the power line.
- Duct Bank - A third method uses parallel conduits held by spacers with sand or concrete filled in-between the conduits. Installation methods: conduit and spacers placed directly into a trench, conduit and spacers placed in concrete forms, or pre-made sections of concrete and conduit.

== Regulations ==
=== Europe ===
The UK regulator Office of Gas and Electricity Markets (OFGEM) permits transmission companies to recoup the cost of some undergrounding in their prices to consumers. The undergrounding must be in National Parks or designated Areas of Outstanding Natural Beauty (AONB) to qualify. In 2021 work started on a project to bury 9 kilometres (5.6 mi) of 400kV overhead power lines running from near Winterbourne Abbas to Friar Waddon (50.669°N 2.514°W, north-west of Weymouth) in Dorset AONB. Similar schemes are planned for Snowdonia, the Peak District and the North Wessex Downs. The most visually intrusive overhead cables of the core transmission network are excluded from the scheme. Some undergrounding projects are funded by the proceeds of national lottery.

Nearly all low and medium voltage electrical power (<50 kV) in the Netherlands is supplied underground. As of 2005 some low voltage overhead lines near Waddinxveen , remain.

In Germany, 73% of the medium voltage cables are underground and 87% of low voltage cables are underground. The high percentage of underground cables contributes to the very high grid reliability (SAIDI < 20).

=== California ===
In the United States, the California Public Utilities Commission (CPUC) Rule 20 permits the undergrounding of electrical power cables under certain situations. Rule 20A projects are paid for by all customers of the utility companies. Rule 20B projects are partially funded this way and cover the cost of an equivalent overhead system. Rule 20C projects enable property owners to fund the undergrounding.

=== Japan ===
Most electrical power in Japan is still distributed by aerial cables. In Tokyo's 23 wards, according to Japan's Construction and Transport Ministry, just 7.3 percent of cables were laid underground as of March 2008.

== Variants ==
A compromise between undergrounding and using overhead lines is installing air cables. Aerial cables are insulated cables spun between poles and used for power transmission or telecommunication services. An advantage of aerial cables is that their insulation removes the danger of electric shock (unless the cables are damaged). Another advantage is that they forgo the costs—particularly high in rocky areas—of burying. The disadvantages of aerial cables are that they have the same aesthetic issues as standard overhead lines and that they can be affected by storms. However, if the insulation is not destroyed during pylon failure or when hit by a tree, there is no interruption of service. Electrical hazards are minimised and re-hanging the cables may be possible without power interruption.

== See also ==
- Overhead power line
- Direct-buried cable
- List of high-voltage underground and submarine cables
- Utility tunnel
