= Sticky icky =

Sticky icky may refer to:

- Slang for cannabis
- "Sticky Icky", a song from Pitbull's album The Boatlift
