= Aerial cable =

Electrical infrastructure

An aerial cable or air cable is an insulated cable usually containing all conductors required for an electrical distribution system (typically using aerial bundled cables) or a telecommunication line, which is suspended between utility poles or electricity pylons. As aerial cables are completely insulated there is no danger of electric shock when touching them and there is no requirement for mounting them with insulators on pylons and poles. A further advantage is they require less right of way than overhead lines for the same reason. They can be designed as shielded cables for telecommunication purposes. If the cable falls, it may still operate if its insulation is not damaged.

As aerial cables are installed on pylons or poles, they may be cheaper to install than underground cables, as no work for digging is required, which can be very expensive in rocky areas.

== Use ==
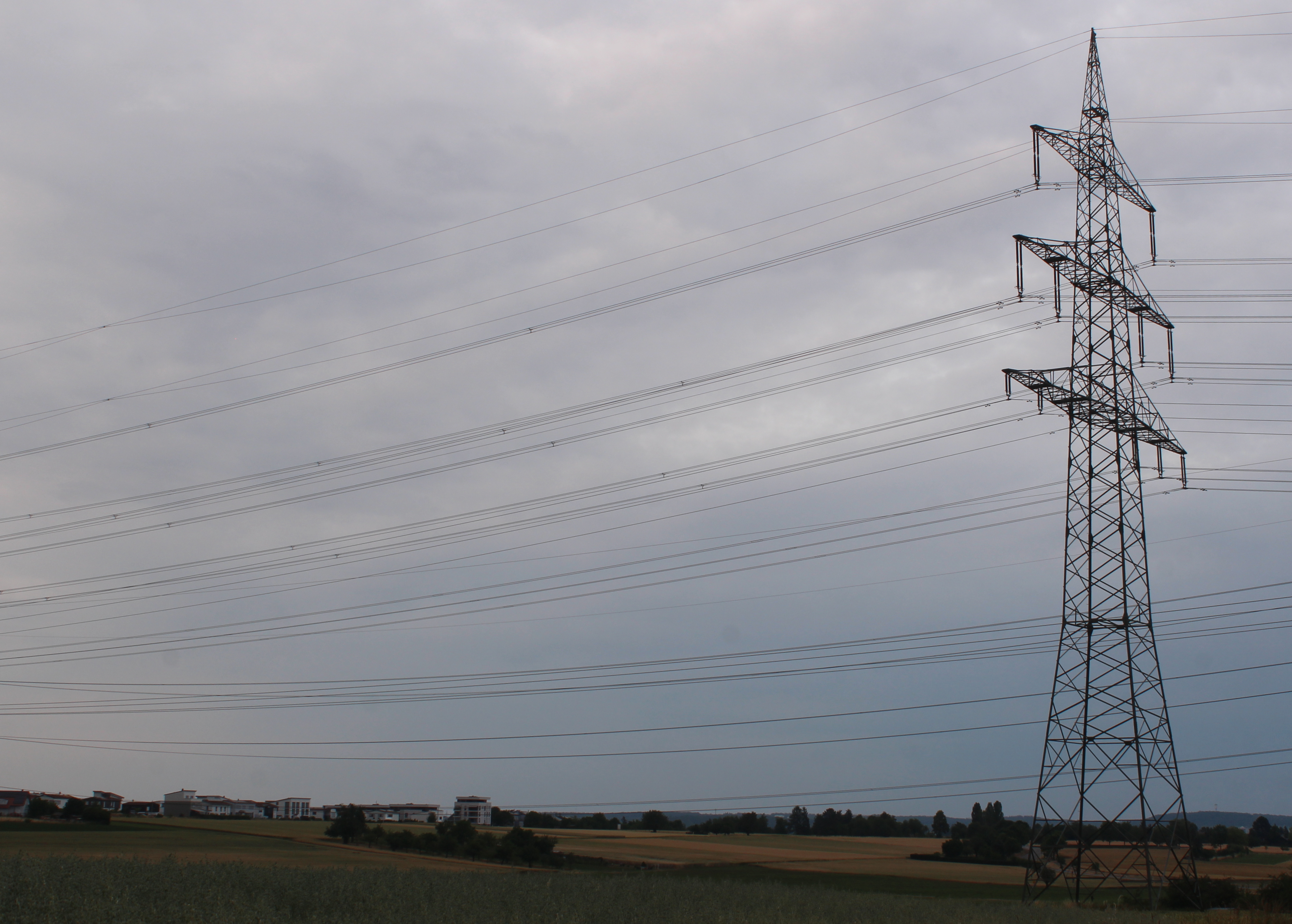
A powerline tower west of Sindelfingen-Darmsheim with two garland-like communication cables, one on the ground conductor and one on an auxiliary rope below it

Aerial cables are mostly used for telecommunication systems or for power transmissions with voltages below 1000 volts. Aerial cable for voltages up to 69,000 volts has also been built, for the supply of farms, waterworks, transmitters and other facilities outside of urban areas. Aerial cables are not often used in transmission circuits because of the difficulty in insulating such high voltage wire. Because of the proven reliability benefits of insulated aerial cables over traditional air-insulated wire, the Electric Power Research Institute (EPRI) has been working with utility companies to develop better insulating materials. In 1996 they were able to successfully convert one lower-voltage transmission circuit to insulated cable.

Although aerial cables usually hang freely, the former German power company EVS used for their internal communication network communication cables that were fixed like a garland on the ground conductor or on an auxiliary rope. Although EVS is today part of EnBW and that replacement of such cables by freely hanging cables started at the beginning at the end of the 1980s, there are still many of these installations in use.

== See also ==
- Aerial insert
- Overhead power line
