= Europe-Persia Express Gateway =

On June 8, 2011, a consortium of four leading telecom carriers from four countries signed the Construction and Maintenance Agreement for the new cable system — Europe-Persia Express Gateway (EPEG).

The new system was launched in December 2012 with an initial capacity of 540 (54×10) Gbps.

The high capacity fibre optic cable system provides additional connectivity between Europe and the Middle East. With a capacity of up to 3.2Tbit/s and a total length of approximately 10,000 km, EPEG offers route diversity passing through Frankfurt across Eastern Europe, Russia, Azerbaijan, Iran and the Persian Gulf to Barka, Sultanate of Oman.
