= Lumitel =

Burundian telecommunications company

Viettel Burundi Société Anonyme (Lumitel)
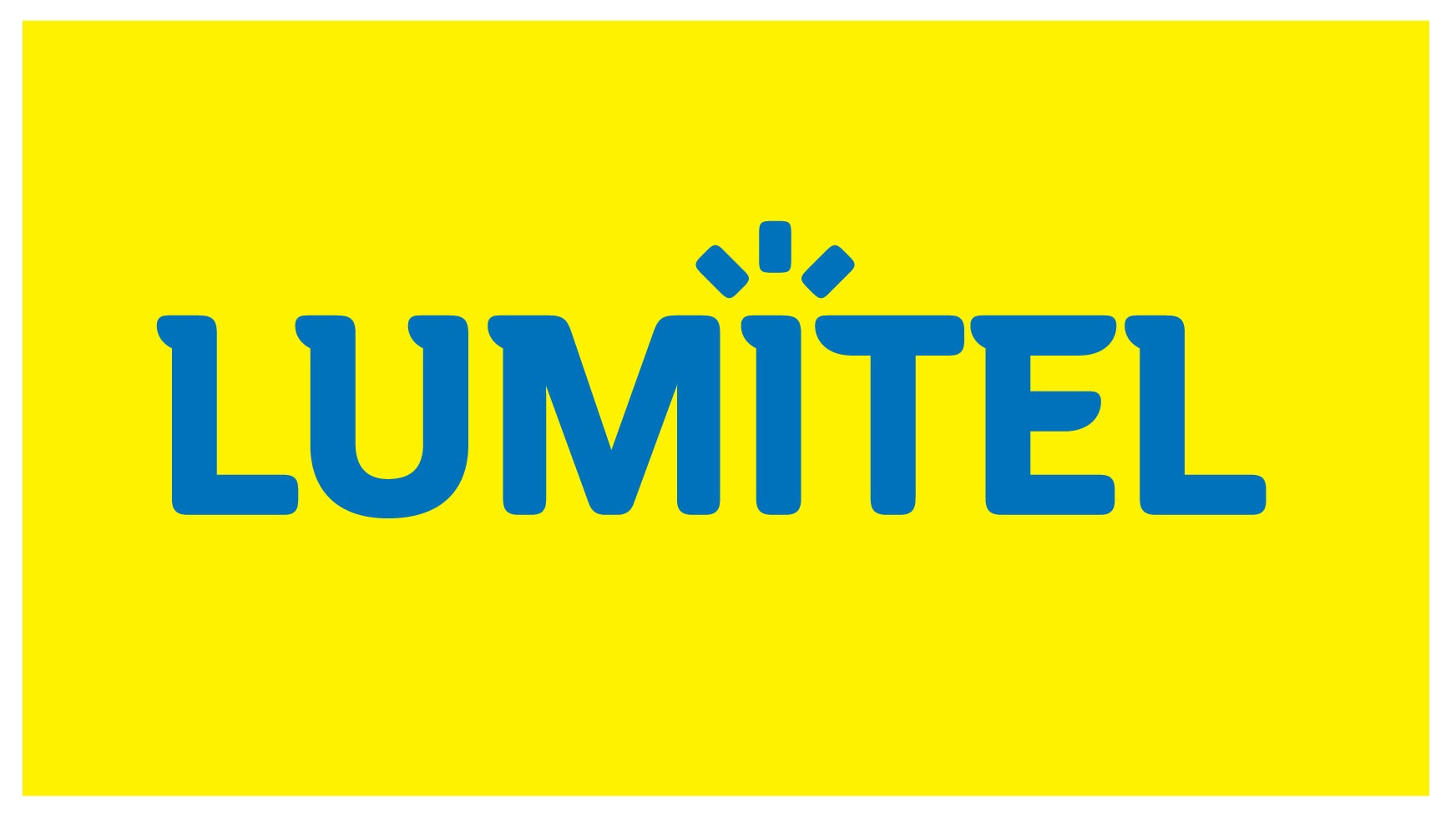
- Type: Société Anonyme
- Industry: Telecommunications
- Founded: 19 December 2013
- Headquarters: 51 Uprona Boulevard, Bujumbura, Burundi
- Area served: Burundi
- Key people: Phan Truong Son (CEO)
- Products: GSM-related products Internet services
- Number of employees: 43,000+ (2021)
- Parent: Viettel Group
- Website: Company website

Lumitel is a mobile communications company, providing voice, messaging, data and communication services in Burundi. It is owned by Viettel Global JSC which is the state-owned Investment Company from Vietnam investing in the Telecommunications market in several countries worldwide. Founded in 2013, Lumitel launched its service in May 2015. It provides services to over 3 million users. Lumitel became the largest operator in Burundi within 1 month of operation.

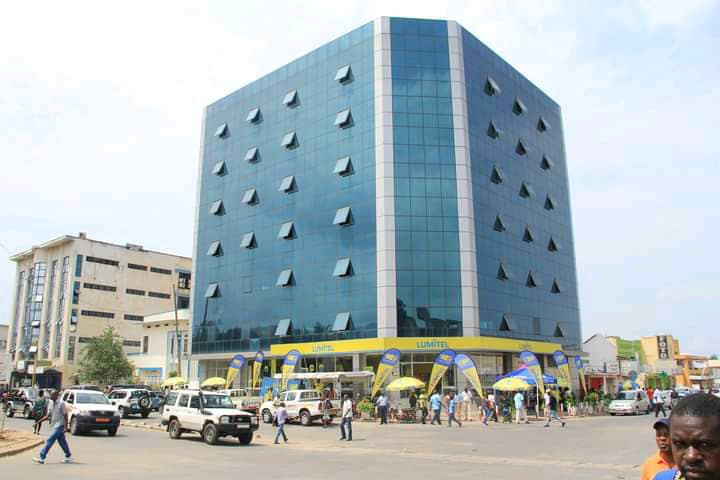
One of Lumitel's offices in Bujumbura

Lumitel began setting up a 4G LTE system in Burundi in 2016. It also operates the mobile wallet service called Lumicash since 2017, and a lottery system called Lumiloto since 2021. The lottery was authorized on 24 November 2020 by LONA and launched on 1 July 2021. As of 2021, Lumitel operates over 25,000 sales location and employs 43,000 sellers.

== See also ==
- List of companies of Burundi

== Sources ==
- Lumitel is pleased to announce the launch of the LUMILOTO electronic lottery service from July 1, 2021 (Press Release), Bujumbura: Lumitel, 3 July 2021
