= List of international submarine communications cables =

This is a list of international submarine communications cables. It does not include domestic cable systems, such as those on the coastlines of Japan, Italy, and Brazil. All the cable systems listed below have landing points in two or more countries. Several older cables are no longer used for international telecommunications, but are used for scientific purposes. Others are simply abandoned.

== Alphabetic list ==
=== 2 ===
- 2Africa – Africa, Middle East, Europe

=== A ===
- AAE-1 – Asia Africa Europe Gateway; France, Italy, Greece, Egypt, Saudi Arabia, Djibouti, Yemen, Qatar, UAE, Oman, Pakistan, India, Myanmar, Cambodia, Thailand, Malaysia, Singapore, Vietnam, Hong Kong
- AAG – Asia America Gateway; Malaysia, Singapore, Thailand, Brunei, Vietnam, Hong Kong, the Philippines, Guam, Hawaii, Continental US West Coast
- AC-1 – Atlantic Crossing; US, UK, Germany, the Netherlands
- AC-2 – Atlantic Crossing, a.k.a. Yellow; US-UK
- ACC-1 – Asia Connect Cable System; Singapore, Indonesia, Australia, East Timor, Guam, US
- ACE – Africa Coast to Europe; France, Spain, Portugal, Morocco, Canary Islands (Spain), Western Sahara, Mauritania, Senegal, Gambia, Guinea, Sierra Leone, Liberia, Côte d'Ivoire, Ghana, Togo, Benin, Nigeria, Cameroon, São Tomé and Príncipe, Equatorial Guinea, Gabon, Congo, Angola, Namibia, South Africa
- Aden-Djibouti – Yemen-Djibouti
- ADRIA-1 – Croatia, Albania, Greece
- AEConnect – Shirley, US, to Killala, Ireland
- Africa-1 – France, Egypt, Saudi Arabia, Yemen, Djibouti, UAE, Pakistan, Somalia, Kenya
- AIS – Australia-Indonesia-Singapore (decommissioned)
- AJC – Australia-Japan Cable
- Alaska Communications System
- ALETAR – Alexandria-Tarsous; Egypt-Syria
- Alonso de Ojeda – Aruba-Curaçao
- ALPAL-2 – Algiers-Palma de Mallorca; Algeria-Spain
- AMERICAS-1 NORTH – US-US Virgin Islands
- AMERICAS-1 SOUTH – US Virgin Islands, Trinidad, Venezuela, Brazil
- AMERICAS-II – US, Puerto Rico, US Virgin Islands, Martinique, Curaçao, Trinidad, Venezuela, French Guiana, Brazil
- Amitié – Bude, UK-Le Porge, France, Lynn, US (due to go live 2022)
- AMX-1 – United States, Mexico, Guatemala, Colombia, Dominican Republic, Puerto Rico, Brazil
- ANNIBAL – France-Tunisia (decommissioned)
- ANTILLAS I – Dominican Republic-Puerto Rico
- Antilles Crossing Phase 1 – US Virgin Islands, St Lucia, Barbados
- ANZAC Cable System – Australia (Melbourne and Tasmania including Flinders Island), New Zealand
- ANZCAN – Australia, New Zealand, Canada (decommissioned)
- APC – Asia-Pacific Cable; Japan, Taiwan, Hong Kong, Malaysia, Singapore
- APCN – Asia-Pacific Cable Network; Japan, Korea, Philippines, Taiwan, Hong Kong, Malaysia, Singapore, Thailand, Indonesia, Australia
- APCN 2 – Asia-Pacific Cable Network 2; Japan, Korea, Philippines, Taiwan, China, Hong Kong, Malaysia, Singapore
- APHRODITE-1 – Greece-Cyprus (decommissioned)
- APHRODITE-2 – Greece-Cyprus
- APNG-1 – Australia-Papua New Guinea (decommissioned)
- APNG-2 – Australia-Papua New Guinea
- APG – Asia-Pacific Gateway
- Apollo – US, UK, France
- ARCOS-1 – Americas Region Caribbean Optical-ring System; US, Mexico, Belize, Guatemala, Honduras, Nicaragua, Costa Rica, Panama, Colombia, Venezuela, Netherlands Antilles, Puerto Rico, Dominican Republic, Turks and Caicos Islands, Bahamas
- it:Arctic Fibre (italian) – UK, Canada, US, Japan (acquired by Quintillion)
- Arctic Link – UK, Canada, US, Japan (planned)
- ARIANE-2 – France-Greece
- ASE (Asia Submarine Cable Express) – Singapore, Malaysia, Philippines, Singapore (2012)
- ASEAN – Singapore, Philippines, Indonesia, Malaysia, Thailand (decommissioned)
- ASH – American Samoa, Samoa, Hawaii
- Atlantica-1/GlobeNet – US, Bermuda, Venezuela, Brazil
- ATLANTIS – Brazil, Senegal, Portugal (decommissioned)
- ATLANTIS-2 – Argentina, Brazil, Senegal, Cape Verde Islands, Canary Islands, Madeira, Spain, Portugal
- ATLAS – Portugal, Morocco (decommissioned)
- Atlas Offshore – Morocco-France
- Australia Singapore Cable – Australia – Singapore
- Australia West Express (planned) – Perth – Diego Garcia – Djibouti

=== B ===
- BAHAMAS 2 – (US-Bahamas)
- BALTICA – (Poland, Denmark, Sweden)
- Banjoewangi – Broome (Australia, Indonesia) (decommissioned)
- Barcelona – Pisa (Spain, Italy) (decommissioned)
- Barcelona – Rome (Spain, Italy) (decommissioned)
- BARGEN – (Cabrera de Mar, Barcelona-Genova) (Spain-Italy) (decommissioned)
- BARSAV – (Barcelona-Savona) (Spain-Italy) (decommissioned 2018)
- BCS – (Sweden, Lithuania, Latvia, Finland)
- BDSNi – (Bahamas Domestic Submarine Network international)
- BERYTAR – (Beirut-Tartous) (Syria-Lebanon)
- Bharat Lanka Cable System – (BLCS) (India-Sri Lanka)
- BICS – (Bahamas Internet Cable System)
- Blue-Raman – (France, Italy, Greece, Israel, Jordan, Saudi Arabia, Djibouti, Oman and Italy)
- BMP – (Brunei, Malaysia, Philippines) (decommissioned)
- Botnia – (Sweden-Finland)
- BRCS – (Batam Rengit Cable System) (Indonesia – Malaysia)
- BS – (Brunei-Singapore) (decommissioned)
- BSCS – (Batam-Singapore Cable System) (Indonesia – Singapore)
- BSFOCS – (Black Sea Fibre Optic Cable System) (Bulgaria, Ukraine, Russia)
- BT-MT1 – (British Telecom – Manx Telecom) (UK-Isle of Man)
- BT-TE1 – (British Telecom – Telecom Éireann) (UK-Ireland)
- BUS-1 – (Bermuda-US – now a segment of GlobeNet)
- BDM – (Batam Dumai Malaka Cable System) (Indonesia – Malaysia)
- BBG – (BBG Bay of Bengal Gateway Cable System) (Barka – Fujairah – India – Sri Lanka – Malaysia – Singapore)

=== C ===
- C-J FOSC – (China-Japan Fibre Optic Submarine Cable)
- CADMOS – (Cyprus-Lebanon)
- Canal Zone – Jamaica (Panama, Jamaica) (decommissioned)
- CANTAT-1 – (Canada Transatlantic) – (Canada-UK) (decommissioned)
- CANTAT-2 – (Canada Transatlantic) – (Canada-UK) (decommissioned)
- CANTAT-3 – (Canada Transatlantic) – (Canada, Iceland, the Faeroes, UK, Denmark, Germany) (decommissioned)
- CANUS-1 – (Canada-US)
- CARAC – (Caribbean Atlantic Cable) (Bermuda-Tortola)
- C-Lion1 – (Finland – Germany)
- Cayman-Jamaica
- CELTIX CONNECT – (UK-Ireland) (planned 2010)
- CFX – (US-Colombia)
- Challenger – (US-Bermuda)
- CIOS – (Cyprus-Israel Optical System) (Cyprus-Israel)
- CIRCE NORTH – (UK-the Netherlands)
- CIRCE SOUTH – (UK-France)
- CKC – (China-Korea Cable) (PRC-South Korea) (decommissioned)
- CNSFTC – (Central North Sea Fibre Telecommunications Company) – (UK-North Sea oil platforms)
- Colombia-Jamaica-Florida
- COLUMBUS II – (US-Mexico-Italy)
- COLUMBUS III – (US-Azores-Portugal-Italy)
- Commonwealth Pacific Cable (COMPAC) (Canada, US, Fiji, New Zealand, Australia) (decommissioned – portions in scientific use)
- Concerto 1 – (Triangular UK-Belgium-the Netherlands)
- CS2 – (Sydney-Solomon Islands), (Sydney-Papua New Guinea)
- Cross-Straits Cable Network (CSCN) (China-Taiwan)
- Corfù–Bar – (Greece-Montenegro)
- CORSAR – (Corsica-Sardinia) (France-Italy)
- Cuba-Venezuela – Cuba-Venezuela (ALBA-1)
- CUCN – (China-US Cable Network) (Korea-US-China-Japan-Guam)

=== D ===
- Danica North (Denmark-Sweden)
- Danica South (Denmark-Sweden)
- DANICE – (Denmark-Iceland)
- Darwin – Banjoewangi (Australia, Indonesia) (decommissioned)
- Denmark-Norway 5
- Denmark-Norway 6
- Denmark-Poland 2
- Denmark-Russia 1
- Denmark-Sweden 15
- Denmark-Sweden 16
- Denmark-Sweden 17
- Denmark-Sweden 18
- DMCS – (Dumai-Melaka Cable System) (Indonesia-Malaysia)
- Dunant – US-France – went live 2020
- DSCS – (Dhiraagu & Sri Lanka Telecom Cable System) (Maldives-Sri Lanka)

=== E ===
- EAC-C2C – (East Asia Crossing/C2C) (Japan, South Korea, Taiwan, China, Hong Kong, Singapore, Philippines, Vietnam, Guam, US)
- Eagle – (Japan-US) – planned
- EASSy – (an East Africa Submarine Cable System with endpoints in South Africa and the Sudan)
- EC-1 – (Eastern Link Cable System) (Trinidad, Netherlands Antilles)
- ECFS – (Eastern Caribbean Fibre System) (Trinidad, Grenada, St Vincent, Barbados, St Lucia, Martinique, Dominica, Guadeloupe, Montserrat, Antigua, St Kitts, St Maarten, Anguilla, Tortola)
- ECSC – (Japan, China) (decommissioned – portions in scientific use)
- EDF1 (INGRID) – (Jersey, France)
- EDF2 (INGRID) – (Guernsey, Jersey, France)
- EE-S1 – (Estonia-Sweden 1) (Estonia-Sweden)
- EESF-2 – (Estonia-Finland)
- EESF-3 – (Estonia-Finland)
- EIG – (Europe India Gateway) (UK, Portugal, Gibraltar, France, Monaco, Libya, Egypt, Saudi Arabia, Djibouti, Oman, UAE, India)
- EMOS 1 – (Eastern Mediterranean Optical System) (Greece, Israel, Turkey, Italy)
- ESAT 1 – (Wexford to Cornwall)
- ESAT 2 – (Dublin to Ainsdale)
- Estepona–Tetuán – (Morocco, Spain)
- EURAFRICA – (Portugal, Morocco, France)

=== F ===
- FALCON – see FLAG FALCON below.
- FARICE-1 – (UK-Faroes-Iceland)
- FARLAND – (UK-the Netherlands)
- FASTER – (US-Japan-Taiwan)
- FEC – (Finland Estonia Connection)
- Fehmarn Belt – (Denmark-Germany)
- Fibralink – (Jamaica-Dominican Republic)
- FLAG FA-1 – (FLAG Atlantic) (US, UK, France)
- FLAG FALCON – (FLAG Alcatel-Lucent Optical Network) – (Bahrain, Egypt, India, Iran, Iraq, Jordan, Kenya, Kuwait, Maldives, Oman, Qatar, Saudi Arabia, Sri Lanka, Sudan, UAE, Yemen)
- FLAG FEA – (FLAG Europe-Asia) (UK, Spain, Italy, Jordan, Egypt, Saudi Arabia, United Arab Emirates, India, Malaysia, Thailand, Hong Kong, China, South Korea, Japan)
- FLAG FNAL – (FLAG North Asian Loop) (Hong Kong, Taiwan, South Korea, Japan)
- Florida-Jamaica – (US, Jamaica) (decommissioned)
- FLAG FP-1 – (FLAG Pacific) (Japan, Canada, US)
- FOG – (Fiber Optic Gulf) (UAE-Qatar-Bahrain-Kuwait)
- FOG2 – (Fiber Optic Gulf 2) (UAE-Iraq-Saudi Arabia)
- France-Algeria (decommissioned)
- France-Greece (decommissioned)
- France-Morocco (decommissioned)
- France-Tunisia (decommissioned)

=== G ===
- G-P – (Guam-Philippines)
- GCN – (Global Caribbean Network) (Guadeloupe, St. Martin, Ste. Croix, Puerto Rico)
- Gemini – (US, UK, Bermuda)
- Georgia-Russia
- Germany-Denmark 1 (decommissioned)
- Germany-Denmark 2
- Germany-Sweden 4 (decommissioned)
- Germany-Sweden 5 (decommissioned)
- GLO-1 – (Globacom-1) (Nigeria, Ghana, Senegal, Mauritania, Morocco, Portugal, Spain, UK) (planned)
- GO-1 – (Italy-Malta)
- Gondwana-1 – (New Caledonia, Australia)
- Gotland-Ventspils – (Sweden-Latvia)
- GPT – (Guam-Philippines-Taiwan) (decommissioned)
- Grace Hopper – (Transatlantic – Bude, New York, Bilbao) – (live 2021)
- Greenland Connect – (Canada-Greenland-Iceland)
- Gulf Bridge International – (Linking the GCC countries (Bahrain, Iran, Iraq, the Kingdom of Saudi Arabia, Kuwait, Oman, Qatar and the UAE) to each other and onwards to Europe, Africa and Asia) – (planned for 2012)
- GWEN – (Greece to Western Europe Network) (Italy – Greece)

=== H ===
- HANNIBAL – (Tunisia-Italy)
- HANTRU-1 – (Guam – Pohnpei (FSM) – Majuro (Marshall Islands) – Kwajalein)
- Havfrue – (New Jersey, US – Blaabjerg, Denmark – branches to Ireland and Norway). Sold under the brand name America Europe Connect-2 = AEC-2. (Live in Q4 2020)
- Hawaiki – (New Zealand, Australia, American Samoa, New Caledonia, Hawaii, Oregon)
- Hawk – (France-Tunisia-Libya-Italy-Turkey-Cyprus-Syria-Egypt) – planned
- HERMES-1 – (UK-Belgium)
- HERMES-2 – (UK-Netherlands)
- Hibernia Atlantic – (UK, Ireland, Canada, US)
- HJK – (Hong Kong-Japan-Korea) (decommissioned)
- Honotua – (Tahiti-Hawaii)
- HONTAI-2 – (Hong Kong-Taiwan) (decommissioned)
- HSCS – (Hokkaido-Sakhalin Cable System) (Russia – Japan)
- HUGO – (High capacity, Undersea Guernsey Optical-fibre) (UK, Guernsey, France)
- HUGO East – (High capacity, Undersea Guernsey Optical-fibre) (France, Jersey, Guernsey)

=== I ===
- I-ME-WE – (India-Middle East-Western Europe) (India, Pakistan, UAE, Saudi Arabia, Egypt, the Lebanon, Italy, France)
- i2i – (India-Singapore)
- India-UAE
- Indigo West (Australia-Indonesia-Singapore)
- IOCOM – (India-Malaysia) (decommissioned)
- Ir-UK Seg A – (Ireland-UK)
- Ir-UK Seg B – (Ireland-UK)
- Italy-Albania
- Italy-Croatia
- Italy-Greece
- Italy-Libya
- Italy-Malta
- Italy-Monaco
- Italy-Tunisia
- ITUR – (Italy-Turkey-Ukraine-Russia)

=== J ===
- Japan-US
- JAKABARE – (Java – Kalimantan – Batam – Singapore) (Indonesia-Singapore)
- JASURAUS – (Jakarta – Surabaya – Australia) (Indonesia-Australia) (Decommissioned)
- Jersey-Guernsey 4
- JKC – (Japan-Korea) (decommissioned – portions in scientific use)
- JNAC – (US, Japan, China, South Korea, Taiwan) (planned, but not built)
- JONAH (Bezeq International Optical System) – (Israel, Cyprus, Italy)

=== K ===
- KAFOS – (Karadeniz Fiber Optik Sistemi) (Turkey, Bulgaria, Romania)
- KATTEGAT-1 – (Denmark-Sweden)
- KATTEGAT-2 – (Denmark-Sweden)
- KELTRA-2 – (Kelibia-Trapani) (Tunisia-Italy)
- Key West-Havana 5 (US, Cuba) (decommissioned – portions in scientific use)
- Key West-Havana 6 (US, Cuba) (decommissioned – portions in scientific use)
- KDN-Reliance – (Yemen – Kenya) (planned for 2007)
- KJCN – (Korea-Japan Cable Network)
- Kuwait-Iran

=== L ===
- La Perouse-Nelson – (Australia, New Zealand) (decommissioned)
- La Perouse-Wakapuaka – (Australia, New Zealand) (decommissioned)
- LANIS-1 – (Isle of Man-UK)
- LANIS-2 – (Northern Ireland (UK) -Isle of Man)
- LANIS-3 – (Northern Ireland-Scotland)
- LEV – (Italy, Cyprus, Israel)
- Liberty – (UK, Guernsey, Jersey, France)
- LION (Lower Indian Ocean Network) – (Madagascar, Reunion, Mauritius)
- LV-SE 1 – (Latvia-Sweden)
- LSP – (Libya-Crete, Greece)

=== M ===
- MAC – (Mid-Atlantic Crossing) (US, St. Croix)
- Main One – (Portugal, Ghana, Nigeria, South Africa) (planned)
- SLT-Dhiraagu Cable System Maldives-Sri Lanka
- Malaysia-Thailand
- MAREA
- MARS – (Mauritius, Rodrigues)
- Marseille-Palermo – (France-Italy)
- MARTEL (Marseille – Tel Aviv) (decommissioned)
- MAT-2 – (Italy-Spain)
- MAYA-1 – (US, Mexico, Cayman Islands, Honduras, Costa Rica, Panama, Colombia)
- MCN – (Mid-Caribbean Network) (Guadeloupe, Dominica, Martinique)
- MCS – (Matrix Cable System) (Indonesia-Singapore)
- MedNautilus – (Italy, Greece, Turkey, Israel, Cyprus)
- MED Cable – (France-Algeria)
- METISS Cable – (Mauritius-Reunion Island-Madagascar-South Africa) (Planned)
- MENA – (Middle East North Africa) (Italy, Greece, Egypt, Saudi Arabia, Oman)
- MIC-1 – (Moratel International Cable 1) (Batam, Singapore)
- Micronesia Cable System –
- MINERVA – (Cyprus-Italy)
- Monet (submarine cable)
- MOYLE NORTH – (Northern Ireland-Scotland)
- MOYLE SOUTH – (Northern Ireland-Scotland)
- MT – (Malaysia-Thailand)
- MTC – (Guam, Marianas Islands)

=== N ===
- NACS – (North Asia Cable System) (Hong Kong, China; Taiwan; Japan)
- NAFSIKA – (Italy-Greece)
- NCP – (New Cross Pacific Cable Network) (US; Japan; South Korea; China; Taiwan)
- New Jersey-Bermuda – (US, Bermuda) (decommissioned)
- New Zealand-Fiji – (decommissioned)
- NorSea Com 1 – (Norway-UK)
- NPC – (North Pacific Cable) – (US, Japan) (decommissioned)

=== O ===
- ODIN – (the Netherlands, Denmark, Norway) (portions decommissioned)
- Okinawa-Luzon-Hong Kong – (Hong Kong, the Philippines, Japan) (decommissioned – portions in scientific use)
- Oman Australia Cable – (Oman-Australia)
- Otranto-Corfù – (Italy-Greece)
- ORVAL – (Algeria-Spain) (expected to enter into operation in 2018)

=== P ===
- PEACE Cable – Pakistan & East Africa Connecting Europe; (Cyprus, Djibouti, Egypt, France, Kenya, Maldives, Malta, Pakistan, Saudi Arabia, Seychelles, Singapore, Tunisia)
- PAC – (Pan-American Crossing) (California, Mexico, Panama, Venezuela, and the Caribbean)
- Pacific Caribbean Cable System – (PCCS) Operational since 2015
- PacRimEast – (Pacific Rim East) (New Zealand-Hawaii) (decommissioned)
- PacRimWest – (Pacific Rim West) (Australia-Guam) (decommissioned)
- PAN AM – (Pan-American Cable System)
- Pangea – (UK-Denmark & UK-the Netherlands)
- Pangea (Baltic Sea) – (Sweden, Estonia, Finland)
- PC-1 – (Pacific Crossing) (California, Washington and Japan)
- PEC – (Pan-European Crossing)
- PLCN – Pacific Light Cable Network (California, US – Taiwan – Philippines)
- PPC-1 – (Pipe Pacific Cable)(Australia, Papua New Guinea, Guam)
- Portugal-UK – (decommissioned)
- Project Express – (Hibernia Atlantic's Project Express)(Canada-UK)
- PTAT-1 – (Private Trans-Atlantic Telecommunications System) (US-UK)

=== Q ===
- Qatar-UAE 1
- Qatar-UAE 2
- Quantum Cable

=== R ===
- REMBRANDT-1 – (United Kingdom – The Netherlands) (decommissioned)
- REMBRANDT-2 – (United Kingdom – The Netherlands)
- RIOJA-1 – (United Kingdom – Spain) (decommissioned)
- RIOJA-2 – (United Kingdom – Belgium) (decommissioned)
- RIOJA-3 – (Belgium – The Netherlands) (decommissioned)
- RJCN – (Russia-Japan Cable Network) (Russia, Japan)
- RJK – (Russia-Japan-Korea)
- RNAL – (Reach North Asia Loop) (Hong Kong – Taiwan – Japan, Hong Kong – Korea – Japan)
- Russian Optical Trans-Arctic Submarine Cable System (ROTACS) – (UK, Russia, China, Japan) (cancelled)

=== S ===
- SAC – (South American Crossing)
- SACS – (South Atlantic Cable System)
- SAex – (South Atlantic Express)
- SAFE – (South Africa-Far East) (South Africa, Mauritius, India, Malaysia)
- SAm-1 – (South America-1)
- SAS – (Samoa-American Samoa)
- SAS-1 – (Saudi Arabia-Sudan)
- SAT-1 – (South Atlantic) (South Africa, Ascension (UK), Cape Verde, Spain, Portugal) (decommissioned)
- SAT-2 – (South Atlantic) (South Africa, Spain, Portugal)
- SAT-3/WASC – (South Atlantic 3/West Africa Submarine Cable) (Portugal, Spain, Senegal, Côte d'Ivoire, Ghana, Benin, Nigeria, Cameroon, Gabon, Angola, South Africa)
- SCAN – (Submarine Cable Asia Network) (Indonesia, Hong Kong) – planned
- Scandinavian Ring
- SEA-ME-WE 1 – (South East Asia-Middle East-Western Europe) (decommissioned)
- SEA-ME-WE 2 – (South East Asia-Middle East-Western Europe) (decommissioned)
- SEA-ME-WE 3 – (South East Asia-Middle East-Western Europe)
- SEA-ME-WE 4 – (South East Asia-Middle East-Western Europe)
- SEA-ME-WE 5 – (South East Asia-Middle East-Western Europe)
- SEA-ME-WE 6 – (South East Asia-Middle East-Western Europe) - planned
- Seabras-1 – (US-Brazil)
- SEACOM – (Singapore-Jesselton(Kota Kinabalu)-Hong Kong-Guam-Madang-Cairns) (decommissioned)
- SEACOM – (South Africa, Madagascar, Mozambique, Tanzania, Kenya, India and Europe)
- SF-S5 – (Sweden-Finland) (decommissioned)
- SFL – (Sweden-Finland Link)
- SFS-4 – (Sweden-Finland)
- SG-SCS – (Suriname-Guyana Submarine Cable System) (Trinidad-Guyana-Suriname)
- SHEFA-2 – (Shetland-Faroes) (UK-Faroes)
- SIRIUS NORTH – (Northern Ireland-Scotland)
- SIRIUS SOUTH – (Ireland-England)
- SJC – (Indonesia, Singapore, Malaysia, Thailand, the Philippines, Hong Kong, China, Japan) – planned
- SMPR-1 – (St. Maarten-Puerto Rico)
- SOLAS – (Ireland-UK)
- Southern Caribbean Fiber – (St Kitts, Martinique, St Lucia, St Vincent and the Grenadines, Grenada, Trinidad and Tobago, Barbados, Guadeloupe, Antigua)
- Southern Cross – (Australia, New Zealand, Fiji, United States)
- SPIN (or South Pacific Islands Network) was a proposed cable system between New Zealand and Tahiti, connecting a number of South Pacific island countries. Cable landing points were proposed for Auckland, Norfolk Island, Noumea, Suva, Wallis, Apia, Pago Pago and Papeete, with a branching unit for Vanuatu. It would have been 6,500 km (4,039 mi) long and have a 64x10 Gbit/s capacity. It was planned to be in service late 2010. The project did not proceed due to lack of funding. The SPIN personnel went on to develop the Hawaiki Cable, which started commercial operation in 2018.

=== T ===
- T-V-H – (Thailand-Vietnam-Hong Kong)
- TAGIDE-2 – (France-Portugal) (decommissioned)
- TAIGU – (Taiwan-Guam) (decommissioned)
- TAILU – (Taiwan-Luzon) (decommissioned)
- TAINO CARIB – (Puerto Rico, US Virgin Islands, British Virgin Islands)
- TampNet – (Norway-North Sea Oil Platforms)
- Tangerine – (UK-Belgium)
- TASMAN 1 – (Australia-New Zealand) (decommissioned)
- TASMAN 2 – (Australia-New Zealand)
- TAT-1 – (UK-Canada) (decommissioned)
- TAT-2 – (France-Canada) (decommissioned)
- TAT-3 – (UK-US) (decommissioned)
- TAT-4 – (France-US) (decommissioned)
- TAT-5 – (Spain-US) (decommissioned)
- TAT-6 – (France-US) (decommissioned)
- TAT-7 – (UK-US) (decommissioned)
- TAT-8 – (US, UK, France) (decommissioned)
- TAT-9 – (US, Canada, Spain) (decommissioned)
- TAT-10 – (Germany-US) (decommissioned)
- TAT-11 – (US, France, UK) (decommissioned)
- TAT-12/13 – (US, UK, France) (decommissioned)
- TAT-14 – (US, UK, France, the Netherlands, Germany, Denmark) (decommissioned)
- TBL – (Trans-Balkan Line) (Italy-Albania, continuing overland through Macedonia, Bulgaria, and into Turkey)
- TCCN – (Trans Caribbean Cable Network) – (US-Jamaica)
- TCS-1 – (Trans-Caribbean System 1) (decommissioned)
- TE North – (Telecom Egypt North) (France-Egypt)
- TEAMS – (The East African Marine System) (UAE-Kenya)
- Telstra Endeavour – (Sydney-Hawaii)
- TGA (Tasman Global Access) – (Australia-New Zealand)
- TIC or TIISCS – (Tata Indicom Cable) or (Tata Indicom India-Singapore Cable System) (India-Singapore)
- TIS – (Thailand-Indonesia-Singapore)
- TPC-1/TRANSPAC-1 – (Trans Pacific Cable) – (Hong Kong, the Philippines, Japan, Guam, Hawaii) (decommissioned – portions in scientific use)
- TPC-2/TRANSPAC-2 – (Trans Pacific Cable) – (Singapore, Hong Kong, South Korea, Taiwan, Guam) (decommissioned – portions in scientific use)
- TPC-3/TRANSPAC-3 – (Trans Pacific Cable) (decommissioned)
- TPC-4 – (Trans Pacific Cable) (decommissioned)
- TPC-5CN – (Trans Pacific Cable) – (Japan, Guam, Hawaii, US)
- TPE – (Trans-Pacific Express) (China, Korea, Taiwan, US)
- TPE2 – (Trans-Pacific Express) (China, Korea, Taiwan, US, Japan)
- TPICK (Telecommunication Plan for Improvement of Communications in Korea) – runs the length of Korea to mainland Japan via Changson-Tsushima-Seburiyama
- Trinidad-Curacao
- TSE-1 (Taiwan Strait Express 1) (First cable directly connecting Taiwan and mainland China)
- TWA-1 (Transworld Associates) (UAE-Oman-Pakistan)

=== U ===
- UGARIT – (Cyprus-Syria)
- UK-Belgium 5 (decommissioned)
- UK-Belgium 6 (decommissioned)
- UK-Channel Isles 7
- UK-Channel Isles 8
- UK-Denmark 4 (decommissioned)
- UK-France 3
- UK-France 4 (decommissioned)
- UK-Germany 5
- UK-Germany 6
- UK-Netherlands 12 (decommissioned)
- UK-Netherlands 14
- UK-Spain 4 (decommissioned)
- ULYSSES-1 – (UK-France)
- ULYSSES-2 – (UK-the Netherlands)
- UNISUR – (Argentina, Uruguay, Brazil)
- UNITY – (Japan-US)

=== V ===
- Ventspils-Farosund (Gotland)-Stockholm
- VSNL Northern Europe – (UK-Netherlands)
- VSNL Western Europe – (UK, Portugal, Spain)
- VSNL SG HK JP Guam – (Singapore, Hong Kong, Japan, Guam)
- VSNL Transatlantic – (UK-US)
- VSNL Transpacific – (Japan, Guam, US)
- VMSCS – (Vodafone Malta-Sicily Cable System) (Italy-Malta)

=== W ===
- WACS – (West Africa Cable System) (South Africa, Namibia, Angola, the Democratic Republic of the Congo, the Republic of Congo, Cameroon, Nigeria, Togo, Ghana, Côte d'Ivoire, Cape Verde, Canary Islands, Portugal, United Kingdom)
- WAFS – (West Africa Festoon System)
- WASC – (West Africa Submarine Cable)

=== Y ===
- Yellow/AC2 – (US-UK)

== See also ==
- List of domestic submarine communications cables
