= Telecommunications in Australia =

Adults employed in the information media and telecommunications industry as a percentage of the adult population in Australia divided geographically by statistical local area, as of the 2011 census

Telecommunications in Australia refers to communication in Australia through electronic means, using devices such as telephone, television, radio or computer, and services such as the telephony and broadband networks. Telecommunications have always been important in Australia given the "tyranny of distance" with a dispersed population. Governments have driven telecommunication development and have a key role in its regulation.

== History ==
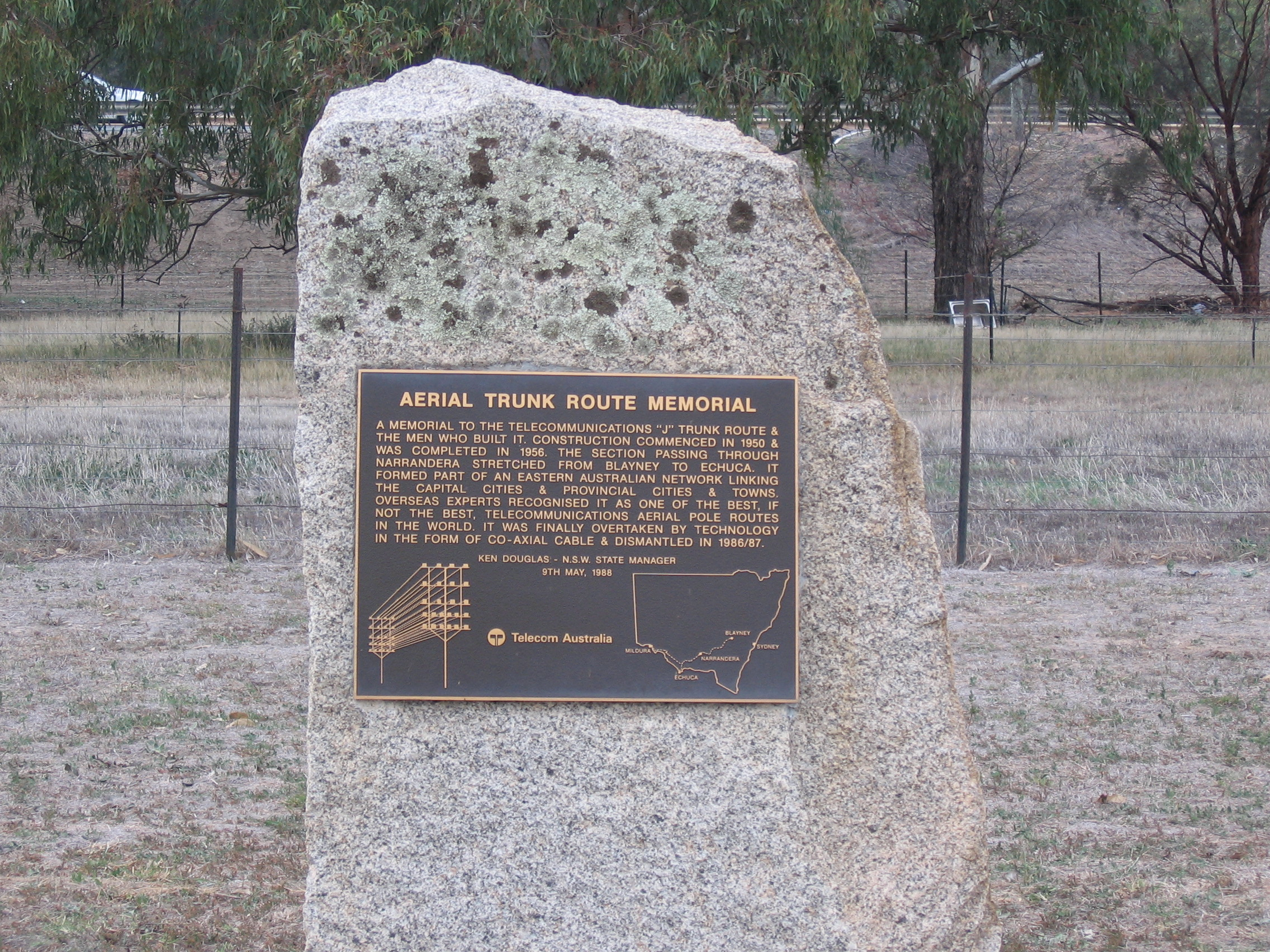
A memorial at Narrandera to the "J" trunk route linking the Australian cities and towns on the east coast

=== Colonial period ===
Prior to Federation of Australia in 1901, each of the six Australian colonies had its own telephony communications network. The Australian networks were government assets operating under colonial legislation modelled on that of Britain. The UK Telegraph Act 1868 for example empowered the Postmaster-General to "acquire, maintain and work electric telegraphs" and foreshadowed the 1870 nationalisation of competing British telegraph companies.

Australia's first telephone service, connecting the Melbourne and South Melbourne offices of Robison Brothers, a Melbourne engineering firm, was launched in 1879. The private Melbourne Telephone Exchange Company opened Australia's first telephone exchange in August 1880. Around 7,757 calls were handled in 1884.

The nature of the networks meant that regulation in Australia was undemanding: network personnel were government employees or agents, legislation was enhanced on an incremental basis and restrictions could be achieved through infrastructure. All the colonies ran their telegraph networks at a deficit through investment in infrastructure and subsidisation of regional access, generally with bipartisan support.

Government-operated post office and telegraph networks – the largest parts of the bureaucracy – were combined into a single department in each colony on the model of the UK Post Office: South Australia in 1869, Victoria in 1870, Queensland in 1880 and New South Wales in 1893.

=== At Federation (1901) ===
At Federation, the colonial networks (staff, switches, wires, handsets, buildings etc.) were transferred to the Commonwealth Postmaster-General's Department responsible for domestic postal, telephone and, telegraph services becoming the responsibility of the first Postmaster-General (PMG), a federal. With 16,000 staff (and assets of over £6 million) the PMG accounted for 80% of the new federal bureaucracy.

Public phones were available in a handful of post offices. Subscriber telephones were initially restricted to major businesses, government agencies, institutions and wealthier residences. Eight million telegrams were sent that year over 43,000 miles of line.

There were around 33,000 phones across Australia, with 7,502 telephone subscribers in inner Sydney and 4,800 in the Melbourne central business district.

Overseas cable links to Australia remained in private hands, reflecting the realities of imperial politics, demands on the new government's resources, and perceptions of its responsibilities.

=== After Federation ===
A trunk line between Melbourne (headquarters of the PMG Department) and Sydney was established in 1907, with extension to Adelaide in 1914, Brisbane in 1923, Perth in 1930 and Hobart in 1935.

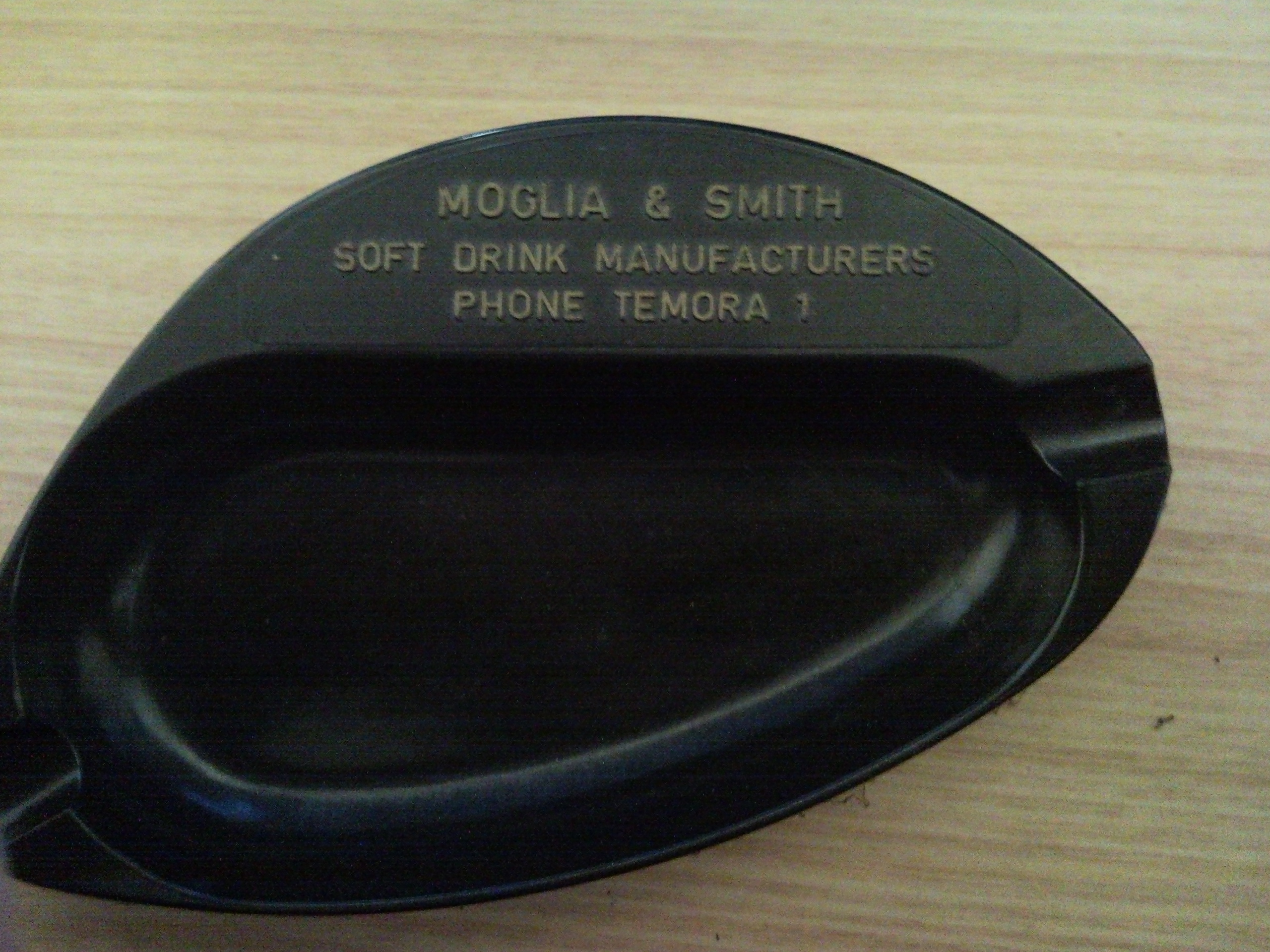
An old bakelite ash tray showing an example of a single digit phone number used in the early days of telecommunication

On 12 July 1906 the first Australian wireless overseas messages were sent between Point Lonsdale, Victoria and Devonport, Tasmania. Australia and New Zealand ratified the 1906 Berlin Radio-telegraph Convention in 1907. The PMG department became responsible for some international shortwave services, particularly from the 1920s and for a new Coastal Radio Service in 1911, with the first of a network of stations operational in February 1912.

The Sydney–Melbourne co-axial cable was officially opened on 9 April 1962. The coaxial cable infrastructure supported the introduction of subscriber trunk dialling between the cities and live television link-ups. After its commissioning in April 1962 the cable carried telegraph and telephone traffic. It also provided the first inter-city television transmission in Australia, allowing simultaneous television broadcasting in Melbourne and Sydney for the first time.

Optus was formed as AUSSAT, a government owned corporation, in 1981. It was privatized later in the 1980s under the Hawke Labor government. Telstra (previously known as Telecom), another government owned asset, was also privatised in 1997 under the Howard Liberal government.

== Broadcasting in Australia ==
Australia developed its own radio broadcasting system, through its own engineers, manufacturers, retailers, newspapers, entertainment services, and news agencies. Initially hobbyists and amateurs were dominant, however with the Commonwealth Government setting up the first radio system, and business interests becoming increasingly involved, hobbyists and amateurs were marginalised. The Australian Labor Party was especially interested in radio because it allowed them to bypass the newspapers, which were mostly controlled by their opposition. Both parties agreed on the need for a national system, and in 1932 set up the Australian Broadcasting Commission was set up as a government agency largely separate from political interference.

The first commercial broadcasters, originally known as "B" class stations were on the air as early as 1925. Many were sponsored by newspapers in Australia, by theatrical interests, by amateur radio enthusiasts and radio retailers, and by retailers generally. Almost all Australians were within reach of a station by the 1930s, and the number of stations remained relatively stable through the post-war era. However, in the 1970s, the Labor government under Prime Minister Gough Whitlam commenced a broadcasting renaissance so that by the 1990s there were 50 different radio services available for groups based on tastes, languages, religion, or geography. The broadcasting system was largely deregulated in 1992, except that there were limits on foreign ownership and on monopolistic control. By 2000, 99 percent of Australians owned at least one television set, and averaged 20 hours a week watching it.

=== Television ===
As early as 1929, two Melbourne commercial radio stations, 3UZ and 3DB were conducting experimental mechanical television broadcasts – these were conducted in the early hours of the morning, after the radio stations had officially closed down. In 1934 Dr Val McDowall at amateur station 4CM Brisbane conducted experiments in electronic television.

Television broadcasting officially began in Sydney and Melbourne just prior to the Melbourne Olympic Games in November/December 1956 and then phased in at other capital cities, and then into rural markets. Many forms of entertainment, particularly drama and variety, proved more suited to television than radio, so the actors and producers migrated there.

It now includes a broad range of public, commercial, community, subscription, narrowcast, and amateur stations across the country. Colour television in the PAL 625-line format went to a full-time basis in 1975. Subscription television, on the Galaxy platform, began in 1995. Digital terrestrial television was introduced in 2001.

Australia moved from PAL 625 to DVB-T on 10 December 2013.

Subscription television, like streaming services, has become more important and is one factor driving demand for the National Broadband Network.

== Core technologies, the network, backhaul and the local loop ==
=== Copper cable and optical fibre networks ===
Prior to the government opening telecommunications to multi player competition the PMG (and later Telecom Australia) operated a vertically integrated system, providing the Core network, backhaul, ancillary networks and a range of services to end users.

With opening telecommunications to multi provider competition the government required Telstra to sell wholesale access to its core facilities and networks.

In the 2000s, larger Internet service providers (ISPs) began taking over more of the delivery infrastructure themselves by taking advantage of regulated access to the unconditioned local loop. As well as significantly reducing costs, it gave the service providers complete control of their own service networks, other than the copper pair (phone line from the exchange to the customer).

Telstra in 2006 proposed replacing its copper network with an optical fibre node network with the drop connection into end user premises being the existing copper cable. They abandoned this as under competition policy they would be required to open their network to competing carriers on a wholesale basis.

Further options were explored with the first Rudd government deciding to set up a National Broadband Network using Fibre to the Premises as the main carrier network, supported by satellite and wireless to remote areas.

After the election of the Abbott government in 2013 a Multi Technological Mix was implemented, replacing FTTP where development was yet to start with Fibre to the Node and also repurposing the Telstra and Optus hybrid fibre-coaxial networks.

=== Cable ===
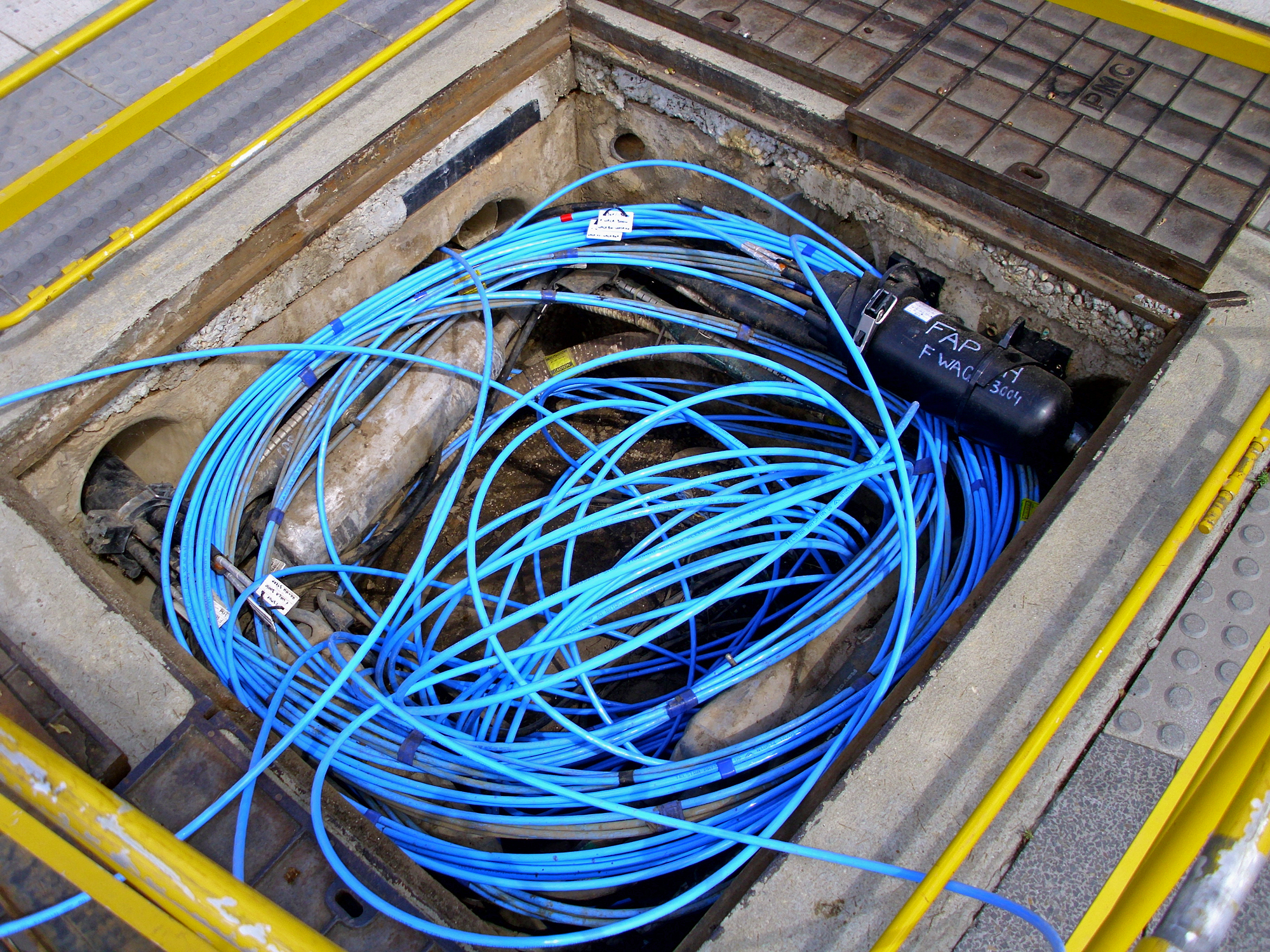
Fibre-optic cable in a Telstra pit, 2010

In the late 1990s, Telstra and Optus rolled-out separate cable Internet services, focusing on the east coast.

=== Satellite ===
The Overseas Telecommunications Commission (OTC) was established by Australia in August 1946 with responsibility for all international telecommunications services into, through and out of Australia.

In 1981 Aussat Pty Ltd was established as a GBE to operate domestic satellite telecommunication and broadcasting services. Aussat's charter restricted it from acting as a competitor to Telecom, including a prohibition on interconnecting public switched traffic with Telecom's network.

Proposals for a merger of Aussat and OTC (thereby permitting national delivery of telecommunication services in competition with Telecom) were rejected in favor of disposal of the satellite operator to a non-government entity that would be allowed to compete with Telecom

Satellites are used to provide telecommunications services in very remote areas. These are primarily the Optus satellites C1 D1 and D2.

There are also a number of satellite earth stations, which provide access points into the Australian networks:

- Intelsat has 10 earth stations, 4 for the Indian Ocean and 6 for the Pacific Ocean.
- Inmarsat has 2 earth stations, which serve the Indian and Pacific Ocean regions.
- SingTel Optus Earth Stations has several earth stations located in the major cities.
- Sky Muster satellites operated as part of the National Broadband Network.
- Telstra has a totals of 48 earth stations, Located between sites in Sydney, Perth and Bendigo serving both the Australian Continent, Asia-Pacific Ocean and Indian Ocean regions.

=== Submarine cables ===
Due to Australia's large size, sparse population, and relative remoteness to other countries, a significant amount of infrastructure is required for Internet communications. The vast majority of Australia's international telecommunications transit capacity is sourced from undersea several fibre-optic cables to Asia and the US:

- Southern Cross Cables to New Zealand, Hawaii and the US mainland with a capacity of 620 Gbit/s, with planned upgrade in Q2 2012.
- Southern Cross Cables to Fiji, Hawaii and the US mainland with a capacity of 620 Gbit/s, with planned upgrade in the Q2 2012.
- Australia-Japan Cable to Guam and Japan. Primarily used as an alternative path to the United States with a capacity of 320 Gbit/s.
- Sea-Me-We3 to Indonesia and onto Asia, Middle East, the United States and other destinations with a capacity of 40 Gbit/s.
- APNG2 (previously part of Pac Rim West) to Papua New Guinea with a capacity of 2x565 Mbit/s.
- INDIGO-West (linking Perth to Jakarta and Singapore.
- Gondwana-1 to New Caledonia.
- TGA to New Zealand.
- PPC-1 (a joint venture of PIPE Networks and Videsh Sanchar Nigam) to Guam with lit capacity of 80 Gbit/s, and potential capacity of 2.56 Tbit/s.
- Telstra Endeavour to Hawaii with a capacity of 320 Gbit/s.

== Telephony and related arrangements ==
The Postmaster-General's Department regulated telecommunications and operated telephone and related communications within Australia over the copper telephony network from federation up to 22 December 1975, replaced by the Postal and Telecommunications Department.

In mid-1975 the department was disaggregated by the Whitlam government into the two Government Business Enterprises: the Australian Telecommunications Commission (trading as Telecom Australia) and the Australian Postal Commission (trading as Australia Post) with a new Postal and Telecommunications Department. The change was intended to take account of the increase in the functions of the department to include all electronic media matters which had previously been the responsibility of the Department of the Media.

The 1982 Davidson Inquiry regarding private sector involvement in delivery of existing/proposed telecommunications services recommended ending Telecom Australia's monopoly.

In June 1991, legislation was passed allowing duopoly competition with Telstra, Optus Communications became Australia's second general telecommunications carrier. It was guaranteed access to Telecom's existing infrastructure on reasonable terms - meant to ensure its viability. Other players were prevented from entering the general telephone market until 1997.

Telecom Australia changed its name to Telstra in 1995 and has since been privatised. It faced growing competition in market niches such as long distance corporate voice and data services. Telstra was progressively privatised (33.3% 1997, 16.6% 1999, 33.3% 2006, with 17% transferred to the Future Fund.

Numbers of licensed telecommunications carriers grew from: ~20 controlling facilities in Australia at 1998 (with several hundred entities providing services using those facilities to end users); to 99 at 2002.

== Regulation ==
The Postmaster-General's Department regulated telecommunications and operated telephone and related communications within Australia over the copper telephony network from federation up to 22 December 1975, replaced by the Postal and Telecommunications Department.

On 1 July 2005, the Australian Communications & Media Authority (ACMA) brought together the Australian Broadcasting Authority (ABA) and the Australian Communications Authority (ACA).

=== Internet censorship ===
On 31 December 2007, Stephen Conroy announced the federal government's intention to censor "inappropriate material" from the Internet. Under the proposed system any Australian who subscribes to an ISP would receive a "clean" version of the Internet. The Federal Government's stated aim is to protect children from accessing violent and pornographic websites. This plan was later abandoned, and the Australian government continues to only block websites that violate online laws.

== Internet ==
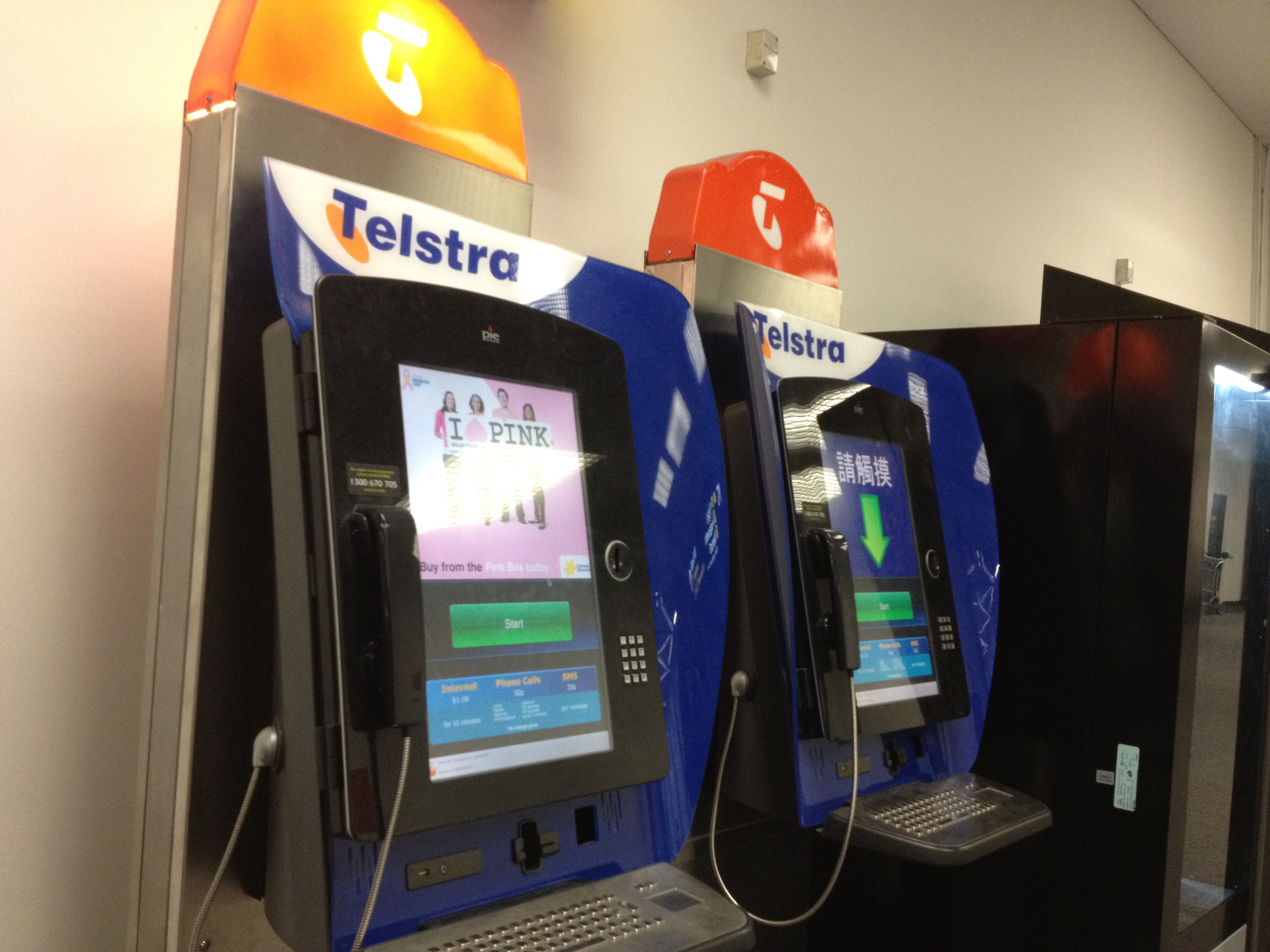
Internet enabled payphone, 2012

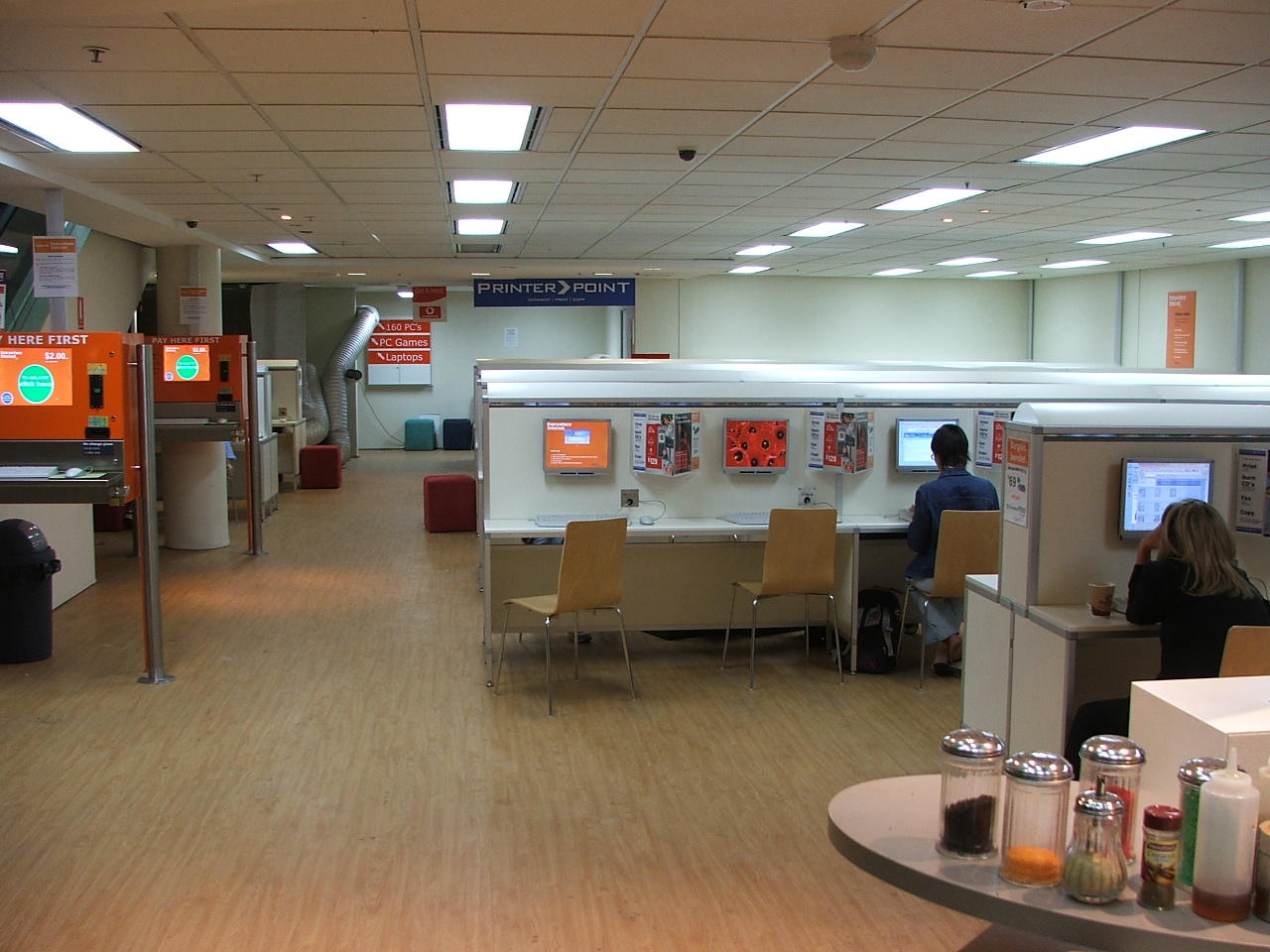
Sydney internet café, 2005

Permanent Internet access was first available in Australia to universities via AARNet in 1989. The first commercial dial-up ISP appeared in capital cities soon after, and by the mid-1990s almost the entire country had a range of choices of dial-up ISPs. Today, Internet access is available through a range of technologies, i.e. hybrid fibre coaxial cable, digital subscriber line (DSL), Integrated Services Digital Network (ISDN) and satellite Internet. The Australian Government, in partnership with the industrial sector, began rolling out a nationwide FTTP broadband network in July 2009.

The .au domain (ccTLD) was delegated to Robert Elz of the Australian Computing Science Network (ACSNet) in March 1986. From then, universities connected one at a time to allow for the sending and receiving of email and for use newsgroup facilities. An earlier restricted IP-based network, linking academic institutions within Australia, known as ACSNet, used the .oz domain. This domain was subsumed under .au to become .oz.au.

A permanent connection between AARNet and ARPANet was established in May 1989 by a satellite connection.

In 1992 there were two competing commercial ISPs expanding to excess of 100 by June 1995 [Internet Australasia Magazine], attributing some fifth of all AARNet traffic.

The Vice Chancellors' Committee sold all commercial customers with Telstra leading the commercial push of the Internet into Australia.

=== Broadband access ===
Broadband internet access is available in Australia using predominantly ADSL, plus cable, fibre, satellite and wireless technologies. Since July 2008 almost two thirds of Australian households have had internet access, with broadband connections outnumbering dial-up two to one. According to the recent ABS statistics the non-dial-up services outnumber dial up services 3.6 to 1.

=== xDSL ===
In 2000, the first consumer ADSL services were made available via Telstra Bigpond, at speeds of 256/64 kbit/s (downstream/upstream), 512/128 kbit/s, and 1500/256 kbit/s. Telstra chose to artificially limit all ADSL speeds to a maximum of 1500/256 kbit/s. As ADSL required access to the telephone exchange and the copper line – which only Telstra had – this allowed Telstra to be dominant due to the expense of roll-out for other companies and Telstra's established customer base. Other ISPs followed suit soon after; reselling connections purchased wholesale from Telstra.

In response to Telstra's monopolisation of ADSL provision other carriers installed their own DSLAMs. Internode

The presence of non-Telstra DSLAMs allowed the service providers to control the speed of connection, and most offered "uncapped" speeds, allowing the customers to connect at whatever speed their copper pair would allow, up to 8 Mbit/s. Ratification of ADSL2 and ADSL2+ increased the maximum to 12 Mbit/s, then 24 Mbit/s.

In November 2007 the first Naked DSL product was announced by iiNet. Shortly after this other internet providers also started to provide DSL products without telephony service over copper, reducing line rental fees.

=== Telstra FTTN ===
Telstra proposed to upgrade to Fibre to the Node (FTTN) in 2006 but did not pursue the development because it would be required to share the network.

=== Wireless broadband ===
Wireless broadband in Australia is widespread, with many point-to-point fixed wireless broadband providers serving broadband-poor regional and rural areas, predominantly with Motorola Canopy and WiMAX technologies. Telstra's 2006 introduction of the "Next G" HSPA network (which reportedly covers 99% of the Australian population as of September 2008) with speeds advertised of being up to 14 Mbit/s stimulated investment in wireless broadband by competitors Optus, Vodafone and Hutchison Telecommunications, who are presently expanding their HSPA networks to cover 96–98% of the Australian population.

=== Rural coverage ===
Delivering competitive telecommunications services to regional and rural areas is a major issue, with Telstra having a Universal Service Obligation regarding telephony services. Government monies have been made available on a competitive basis to carriers to address broadband and mobile telephone blackspots and gaps in service provision.

=== National Broadband Network ===
The National Broadband Network was initially a fibre-to-the-home open-access network in planning and trial operation in Australia by the federal government. The national broadband network aimed to provide up to 1000 Mbit/s speeds and to connect to 93% of Australian households and businesses. This has since been revised under a Coalition government to a mixed-technology system relying largely on Australia's existing and largely depreciated copper networks. This revision aims for 50 Mbit/s to 100 Mbit/s, with consumer reports ranging from 1 Mbit/s to 100 Mbit/s. The government will hold a majority share (51%) in the network company, with the remainder being held by private firms. The Australian government had previously called for proposals to build a fibre-to-the-node broadband network providing download speeds up to 100 and upload speeds up to 40 megabits per second. The government also utilises fixed wireless technology and satellite technology to provide fast broadband connection in rural area and very remote area. Fixed wireless provides speeds up to 50/20 Mbit/s. Satellite technology uses two Sky Muster communication satellites launched in 2015 and 2016 to provide fast broadband in very remote areas and offshore. It provides speeds up to 25/5 Mbit/s.

The network will be the largest single infrastructure investment in Australia's history.

== Incidents ==
=== 2023 Optus outage ===
On 8 November 2023 at around 04:00 AEDT, all Optus services, including wireless phone, internet, and mobile, stopped working. This led to over 10 million people and over 400,000 businesses without services provided by the telco. The outage lasted from 9-13 hours, with mobile coverage being the first thing restored.

== See also ==
- List of LTE networks
- List of mobile network operators of the Asia Pacific region
- Indigenous Remote Communications Association
- Global Coalition on Telecommunications
