= Communications in Guam =

Though Guam is a United States territory, some U.S. long-distance plans and courier services list Guam as an international location. As a result of Guam's being added to the North American Numbering Plan (NANP) in 1997, calls made to the U.S., Canada, or other participating countries from Guam (or to Guam from other NANP locations) only require the caller to dial a 1 followed by the area code.

In this way, only domestic charges are incurred between the US and Guam on most carriers. Before Guam's inclusion, calling the U.S. required dialing the international 011 first, thus resulting in higher long-distance rates and less frequent calls to the U.S. by relatives in Guam. Prices of long-distance calls to these destinations have dropped significantly to the point where now calling the U.S. from Guam or calling Guam from the U.S. costs the same.

== Mail ==
Some companies in the U.S. mainland still treat Guam as a foreign country and refuse to sell and ship items to Guam. However, if an item is shipped via USPS, shipping costs to Guam are the same as coast-to-coast shipping costs within the US. Many others will ship to Guam but will charge the shipping as an international destination. This is mainly because the company is using a private shipping company like UPS, FedEx, or DHL for its shipping.

Much of the mail to and from Guam routes through Hawaii and awaits cargo space on United Airlines which is contracted to deliver mail between Hawaii and Guam.

== Telephones ==
Telephones – main lines in use: 85,000 (2007)

Telephones – mobile cellular: 98,000 (2007)

Telephone system:

domestic: GTA: ~70,000 local access lines, dial-up and DSL, Internet, long-distance service, TDMA and GSM wireless services via Pulse Mobile & Docomo Pacific (formerly Guam Wireless), ChoicePhone LLC, dba iConnect with iDen, GSM and 4G LTE networks.
international: satellite earth stations – 2 Intelsat (Pacific Ocean); submarine cables to United States, Japan and Australia.
international access code: +1.671 (in the North American Numbering Plan, Area code 671)

== Radio and television ==
Radio broadcast stations: AM 4, FM 7, shortwave 2 (2005)

Radios: 300,000 (2007)

Television broadcast stations: 8 (2007)

Televisions: 200,000 (2007)

== Internet ==
Internet service providers (ISPs): 4 (2013)

Country code (Top-level domain): GU

== Submarine cables ==
Because of its location in the western Pacific and its status as U.S. territory, Guam has one of the most extensive submarine communications cable infrastructures in the Asia-Pacific. The 2011 Tōhoku earthquake and tsunami cut many of the primary cables connecting the United States and Asia, prompting companies to look for alternate locations for new cables. In 2019, GTA Teleguam and RTI Cable built the island's first combined neutral cable landing station and data center. This coincided with a bill introduced to the Legislature of Guam by Sen. Telo Taitague to conduct an economic study and develop policy recommendations on submarine cables. GTA also seeks to attract U.S. companies to build data centers on Guam, noting the reduced network latency from Asia to Guam, compared to the U.S. Existing cable landing stations and their cables are:

- Tanguisson cable landing station in Tamuning: Asia-America Gateway, Australia–Japan Cable and Guam-Philippines
- Tumon Bay cable landing station in Tamuning: TPC-5CN, Australia–Japan Cable
- Tata Piti cable landing station: VSNL Transpacific, Tata TGN-Intra Asia, and Pipe Pacific Cable-1
- GTA Piti-I cable landing station: SEA-US, Japan-Guam-Australia South
- Gateway Network Connections neutral cable landing station and data center in Piti: HK-G, Japan-Guam-Australia North, SxS Cable System
- Unknown landing station: HANTRU-1

Retired cables landing on Guam include China-US Cable Network and PacRimWest.

== See also ==
- Area code 671, Guam's telephone area code
