= Tasman Global Access =

Submarine communications cable linking Australia and New Zealand

- Cable type: Fibre-optic
- Construction beginning: 2016
- Construction finished: 2017
- First traffic: 2017
- Design capacity: 20 tbit/s
- Built by: Alcatel Submarine Networks
- Landing points: 2 (Raglan, New Zealand, Narrabeen, New South Wales)
- Owner(s): Spark New Zealand, Telstra, Vodafone

Tasman Global Access (TGA) is a 2,288 km fibre-optic submarine communications cable that entered service in 2017, linking Australia and New Zealand. TGA consists of two fibre pairs and has a total design capacity of 20 terabits per second.

== See also ==
- Other Australian international submarine cables (and year of first service):
  - Australia Singapore Cable (2018)
  - Hawaiki Cable (2018)
  - Pipe Pacific Cable (2009)
  - Telstra Endeavour (2008)
  - Australia–Japan Cable (2001)
  - Southern Cross Cable (2000)
  - SEA-ME-WE 3 (2000, Australian portion in service earlier)
  - JASURAUS (1997)
  - PacRimWest (1995)
