= Communications in Colombia =

Since being liberalized in 1991, the Colombian telecommunications sector has added new services, expanded coverage, improved efficiency, and lowered costs. The sector has had the second largest (after energy) investment in infrastructure (54 percent) since 1997. However, the economic downturn between 1999 and 2002 adversely affected telecommunications. During this period, Colombia's telecommunications industry lost US$2 billion despite a profit of US$1 billion in local service. In June 2003, the government liquidated the state-owned and heavily indebted National Telecommunications Company (Empresa Nacional de Telecomunicaciones—Telecom) and replaced it with Colombia Telecomunicaciones (Colombia Telecom). The measure enabled the industry to expand rapidly, and in 2004 it constituted 2.8 percent of gross domestic product (GDP). Telefónica of Spain acquired 50 percent plus one share of the company in 2006.

As a result of increasing competition, Colombia has a relatively modern telecommunications infrastructure that primarily serves larger towns and cities. Colombia's telecommunication system includes access to 8 different international Submarine cable systems, Intelsat, 11 domestic satellite Earth stations, and a nationwide microwave radio relay system.

== Telephones ==
The country's teledensity (the density of telephone lines in a community) is relatively high for Latin America (17 percent in 2006). However, there is a steep imbalance between rural and urban areas, with some regions below 10 percent and the big cities exceeding 30 percent. Bogotá, Medellín, and Cali account for about 50 percent of telephone lines in use. By the end of 2005, the number of telephone main lines in use totaled 7,851,649. Colombia Telecom accounted for only about 31 percent of these lines; 27 other operators accounted for the rest.

Colombia's mobile market is one of the fastest-growing businesses in the country. In 1993, the first mobile phone call was made. In mid-2004 mobile telephones overtook fixed lines in service for the first time. By 2005 Colombia had the highest mobile phone density (90 percent) in Latin America, as compared with the region's average density of 70 percent. The number of mobile telephone subscribers totaled an estimated 31 million in 2007, as compared to 21.8 million in 2005 and 6.8 million in 2001.

== Radio and television ==
In late 2004, Radio Televisión Nacional de Colombia (RTVC) replaced the liquidated Inravisión (Instituto Nacional de Radio y Televisión) as the government-run radio and television broadcasting service, which oversees three national television stations and five radio companies (which operate about a dozen principal networks). Colombia has about 60 television stations, including seven low-power stations. In 2000 the population had about 11.9 million television receivers in use. Of the approximately 515 radio stations, 454 are AM; 34, FM; and 27, shortwave.

== Undersea Cables ==
As of 2016, Colombia has access to the following international Submarine cable systems: SAC/LAN, Maya-1, AMX-1, Pan Am, SAm-1, ARCOS-1, CFX-1, and PCCS. These cables land at 4 locations in the Caribbean: Barranquilla, Cartagena, Riohacha, and Tolu. One cable lands on the Pacific Ocean coast at Buenaventura, Valle del Cauca.

== Internet ==
Colombia is still far behind Brazil, Mexico, and Argentina in terms of online usage. It had an estimated total of 900,000 Internet subscribers by the end of 2005, a figure that equated to 4,739,000 Internet users, or 11.5 percent of the 2005 population (10.9 per 100 inhabitants). By late 2009 39% of households had internet access Colombia had 581,877 Internet hosts in 2006. Although as many as 70 percent of Colombians accessed the Internet over their ordinary telephone lines, dial-up access is losing ground to broadband. In 2005 Colombia had 345,000 broadband subscriber lines, or one per 100 inhabitants. In 2006 the number of personal computers per 1,000 people increased to an estimated 87 per 1,000 inhabitants, a rate still below that in other large Latin American economies. The internet country code is .co.
