= Rioja =

Rioja or La Rioja may refer to:

- Rioja (wine), a wine region in Spain with center in the autonomous community of La Rioja

== Places ==
- La Rioja, Spain, an autonomous community and province
  - La Rioja (Congress of Deputies constituency)
  - La Rioja (Senate constituency)
  - University of La Rioja
  - Etymology of La Rioja
- Rioja, Almería, Spain
- Rioja Province (Peru)
  - Rioja District, one of the districts of Rioja Province
  - Rioja, Peru, the capital of the Rioja Province
- La Rioja, Argentina
  - La Rioja Province, Argentina, the province of which the Argentine city of La Rioja is the capital of.
  - National University of La Rioja

== People ==
- Bernardino Bilbao Rioja (1895–1983), Bolivian military officer and politician
- Francisco de Rioja (1583–1659), Spanish poet, canon of Seville Cathedral, member of the Spanish Inquisition
- Pilar Rioja (born 1932), Mexican dancer

== Other uses ==
- 209083 Rioja, a minor planet named after the wine
- Submarine telecommunications cable systems RIOJA-1, RIOJA-2, RIOJA-3.
- Rioja (moth), a genus of Pyralidae moths
