= Vertel =

Australian telecommunications company

Vertel is an Australian telecommunications carrier that focuses on designing, building, and operating Wireless networks for Corporations, Government, and Service Providers. The company offers fixed wireless services, known as Etherwave CE VPN, which utilize a combination of microwave solutions and fiber optics to establish private and scalable networks connecting multiple points.

Vertel is a member of the Metro Ethernet Forum (MEF) and was the first independent wireless carrier in the world to gain MEF certification for its Layer 2 Ethernet Service.

== History ==
The company was formed in 1973 when an Australian entrepreneur started a business called Communication Site Rentals. As the name suggests, this business initially provided high communication sites for government departments and large organizations who wanted to deploy two way radio (at the time a relatively new technology).

At this time, Telecom Australia (now Telstra) was still a part of the Postmaster General's Department and would be until 1975.

Vertel provided its first fully managed two way radio network some 24 years before the deregulation of the Australian telecommunications market, and eight years before the first mobile phone call was placed in the country.

== MEF Awards ==
In 2012 Vertel was awarded Best Carrier Ethernet Service in the APAC region
