= TSE-1 =

Submarine cable between Mainland China and Taiwan

TSE-1 or Taiwan Strait Express 1 is the first submarine telecommunications cable directly linking Taiwan island and mainland China. At 270 km in length, the cable offers the shortest route between Taiwan and mainland China while avoiding seismically active zones prone to disruption during earthquakes. TSE-1 was completed on January 18, 2013. Once activated, traffic between Taiwan and China will no longer have to be routed via the Asia-Euro Under-sea Optical Cable, the China-US Cable Network or the Asia Pacific Cable Network 2.

Construction and operation of TSE-1 is overseen by a consortium of telecommunications companies from China and Taiwan. The consortium includes Taiwan International Gateway Corporation, China Mobile, Chunghwa Telecom, Taiwan Mobile, Far EasTone Telecommunications, and China Unicom.

Total bandwidth design capacity of TSE-1 is 6.4 Tbit/s, consisting of eight fiber pairs.

TSE-1 has landing points in:

- Changle, Fuzhou City, China
- Tamsui District, New Taipei City, Taiwan
