= Circe (cable system) =

Circe is a submarine communications cable that connects network switches in the United Kingdom with those in Belgium, France, Germany, and the Netherlands. It was built at a cost of US$1 billion by Viatel in the late 1990s and measures up to 8,700 km in total length. According to a 1998 Bloomberg Businessweek article, Circe is one of the first cross-border fibre-optics networks in Europe.

In 2013, media reports revealed that communication passing through Circe is being secretly monitored by the British intelligence agency GCHQ as part of its ongoing surveillance project.

== See also ==
- List of international submarine communications cables
