= UK-Belgium 5 =

Submarine communications cable

- Owners: British Telecom; Deutsche Bundespost; PTT Telecommunicatie; Regie TT
- Total length: 122.6 kilometres (76.2 mi)
- Design capacity: 280Mbits/s
- Technology: Optical Fibre
- Date of first use: May 1986
- Decommissioning date: January 2005

UK-Belgium 5 was a submarine communications cable linking the United Kingdom and Belgium. Originally planned in 1984, the system entered service in May 1986.

It was the first international undersea cable system to use optical fibre rather than coaxial cable. The cable ran from Broadstairs to Ostend. The shore ends were installed by Dutch vessel DG Bast in September 1985, and the cable by vessel Alert in early 1986. Constructed by Standard Telephones and Cables, UK-Belgium 5 was purchased by a consortium of European companies, British Telecom, Deutsche Bundespost, PTT Telecommunicatie and Regie TT. The cable had 3 repeaters and had 3 pairs of optic fibres, each operating at 280 Mbit/s giving a total capacity of 11,520 x 64 kbit/s circuits.

UK-Belgium 5 was withdrawn from service in January 2005.

== See also ==
- List of international submarine communications cables
