= Gondwana-1 =

- Owners: (OPT-NC)
- Landing points: Narrabeen beach, Sydney, Australia; Ouémo peninsula, Nouméa, New Caledonia; Poindimié commune, New Caledonia; Mouli Island, Ouvea commune, New Caledonia; Xepenehe, Lifou commune, New Caledonia
- Technology: Optical fiber cable
- Date of first use: 2008

Gondwana-1 is a submarine communications cable network connecting New Caledonia and Australia brought into service in mid-2008.

The cable is owned and operated by (OPT-NC) (Office des postes et Télécommunications de Nouvelle-Calédonie), the government-owned telecommunications carrier in New Caledonia.

The cable landing points are:

- Narrabeen beach, Sydney, New South Wales, Australia
- Ouémo peninsula, Nouméa, New Caledonia

And a second cable from

- Poindimié commune, North Province, New Caledonia
- Mouli Island, Ouvea commune, Loyalty Islands Province, New Caledonia
- Xepenehe, Lifou commune, Loyalty Islands Province, New Caledonia

The Australian end of the Cable was terminated in mid November 2007 by the Cable Ship Ile de Re completing the laying of the cable. The fibre optic cable is laid in the Northern Sydney Protection Zone and comes ashore at Narrabeen beach where the Southern Cross Cable and Australia-Japan Cable are also laid. The system was officially brought into service in September 2008. Gondwana drastically boosted the capacity of the New Caledonia international gateway and decreased the latency to reach Australia and Western Europe, previously handicapped by a 700 ms round trip delay between Australian and Caledonian satellite teleport. It offers the second fibre access point in South Pacific islands after Fijian access to Southern Cross cable, commissioned in 2001.

The fibre optic cable is a two-part system, firstly linking New Caledonia to Australia (and then on to the world via the existing Australian fibre optic cables) and a short unrepeated cable from New Caledonia to the Loyalty Islands, with a landing stations at Poindimie (Main island), Mouly (Ouvea) and Xepenehe (Lifou).

The need for the cable was the increasing demand for advanced telecommunications such as broadband and due to the high cost of satellite bandwidth.

== See also ==
- List of international submarine communications cables
