= Transpac (cable system) =

Series of undersea telecom lines

TRANSPAC or Trans-pacific cable (TPC) is a series of undersea cables under the Pacific Ocean.

== Transpac 1 ==
TRANSPAC-1 (TPC-1) was laid by AT&T's cable ship C.S. Long Lines. and opened on June 19, 1964. It connected Hawaii, Midway Atoll, Wake Island, Guam, and Japan. A branch from Guam to the Philippines was completed in December 1964. This cable connected with HAW-1 to complete the telephone connection to the mainland United States. It had a capacity of 142 channels. TRANSPAC-1 was part of the network that supported the Apollo 11 Moon landing mission in 1969.

== Transpac 2 ==
In 1975, Transpac-2 (TPC-2) connected Guam, Taiwan, Korea, Hong Kong and Singapore with 845 channels.

== Transpac 3 ==
Transpac 3 (TPC-3), which went into service April 18, 1989, increased capacity to 3780 channels. This was the first fiber-optic cable across the Pacific, and it replaced the two existing copper cables (Transpac 1 and Transpac2) as well as satellite circuits being used at the time. It was laid from Point Arena, California to Makaha, Hawaii, from which it goes to an undersea branching unit and splits to Chikura, Japan and Tanguisson, Guam.

== TPC-5CN ==
The TPC-5CN cable network is a 25,000 km fiberoptic ring, carrying 5 Gbit/s in each channel.

== History ==
1874	Adventurer Celso Caesar Moreno lobbied US Senator Frederick Theodore Frelinghuysen to introduce a bill on May 18, 1874, to grant a charter to Moreno and thirteen others for the construction and maintenance of a trans-Pacific telegraph cable.
1876	A bill was passed and signed by President Grant, for a non-exclusive charter requiring the project to begin no later than three years after its passage. Subsequent fund raising efforts for the project were unsuccessful, and the deadline expired without the cable being started.
1895	US Congress once again began to consider legislation on a trans-Pacific telegraph cable in 1895. Moreno unsuccessfully lobbied the United States House of Representatives for an extension of his 1876 charter.
1975	Shore-end cable section (Guam) and shallow sea section of the No.2 Trans-Pacific Cable (TPC-2); Shore-end cable section (Okinawa) and shallow sea section of the No.2 Trans-Pacific Cable (TPC-2)
1987	Shore-end cable section (Chikura side) and shallow sea section of the No.3 Trans-Pacific Cable (TPC-3)
1988	No.3 Trans-pacific Cable (TPC-3) (Laid cable length: approx. 3,834 km)
1991	No.4 Trans-Pacific Cable (TPC-4) (Laid cable length: approx. 1,259 km)
1993	Shore-end cable section (Ninomiya side) and shallow sea section of the No.5 Trans-Pacific Cable Network (TPC-5)
1993	Shore-end cable section (Ninomjya side) of the No.5 Trans-Pacific Cable Network (TPC-5)
1994	Shore-end cable section (Miyazaki side) of the No.5 Trans-Pacific Cable Network (TPC-5)
1995	No.5 Trans-Pacific Cable Network (TPC-5) (Laid cable length: approx.2,958 km)

== See also ==
- Commercial Pacific Cable Company
- Submarine communications cable
