= JASURAUS =

- Cable type: Fibre-optic
- Fate: Decommissioned
- Construction beginning: 1995
- Construction finished: 1997
- First traffic: 1997
- Design capacity: 5.332 Gbit/s
- Built by: Alcatel
- Defunct: 2012
- Landing points: Jakarta, Indonesia; Port Hedland, Western Australia
- Area served: Asia-Pacific
- Owner(s): Telstra (68.75%); Optus (31.25%)

JASURAUS was a 5.332 Gbit/s, 2,800 km optical submarine telecommunications cable that connected Port Hedland, Australia, to Jakarta, Indonesia, with a further interconnection to the APCN and which was decommissioned in 2012.

The cable owners of the JASURAUS system that became part of the APCN were Optus, Telstra and Indosat. They joined the APCN consortium by transferring 90% of the JASURAUS capacity for 10% on the APCN.

JASURAUS was conceived in 1995 as an additional link from Australia to provide telephony services connected to the world, with a design life of 25 years and at a cost of A$160 million. The name was derived from a concatenation of the originally planned sites of 'Jakarta' - 'Surabaya' - 'Australia'. However, the Surabaya landing was abandoned before project commencement, though the name remained.

The landing point in Indonesia was at Ancol Cable Station.

The final landing point chosen at the Australian end was in Port Hedland, a number of options were looked into for the cable station including a secure concrete duct to the existing South Hedland exchange 11 km inland utilising the vacant 2nd floor which had previously been used for the Telstra Manual Assistance Centre.

The PFE, SLTE and MUX equipment was finally commissioned in a new purpose-built building located adjacent to the Cooke Point exchange. It featured many redundant systems, including a new physically diverse fibre to connect to the existing inland fibre route to Perth.

At the time of being ready for service in 1997, the main cables linking Australia to the world were Tasman2 (Sydney to Auckland connecting with PacRimEast and continuing to Hawaii) and PacRimWest (Sydney to Guam). Each system consisted of two fibre pairs delivering a total of 560 Mbit/s bandwidth per system. Jasuraus was designed to deliver a dramatic increase in network capacity, and was able to carry nearly 60,000 phone calls simultaneously at a data rate of 5.332 Gbit/s.

JASURAUS was overtaken in 2000 by the 40 Gbit/s SeaMeWe3 and 320 Gbit/s Southern Cross Cable Network, just 3 years after start-up. The new systems provided stiff competition for JASURAUS, due to their higher bandwidth and easy access to systems located in the United States, and ongoing economic concerns proved to be an issue for the primary operators Telstra and Optus throughout the life of the cable.

While JASURAUS was capable of supporting an upgrade to 20 Gbit/s, such agreements would have required consensus from the JASURAUS operators and APCN's owners. Proposed upgrades were further hampered due to the high cost charged by Telstra to third parties for the provision of IP transit and Leased line services from Port Hedland to Perth, which resulted in decreased demand from carriers as there was no alternative communications path out of Port Hedland.

In the absence of upgrades beyond its initial bandwidth, JASURAUS saw minimal further use. Its remaining years were spent largely idle, with the cable retained as a backup link out of Australia and as an additional source of connectivity for AARNet.

According to industry sources, JASURAUS was decommissioned in 2012.

== See also ==
- List of international submarine communications cables
