= Columbus II =

Transatlantic commincations cable

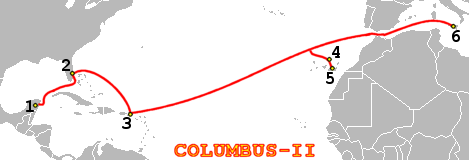

COLUMBUS II is an optical, repeatered, transatlantic telephone cable. It is approximately 12,102 km (7,520 mi; 6,535 nmi) in length. It entered into commercial service in 1994. The system, along with the Americas cable, was the first to use the Erbium-doped fiber amplifier (EDFA) as its optical amplifier repeaters. In 2009, the transatlantic section was retired, and as of 2023, only the Columbus-II-B section remains in use and has been upgraded.

It is in 3 segments has landing points in:

- Columbus II - A (1121 km) - 560 MB/s

1. Cancún, Mexico
2. West Palm Beach, Florida, United States

- Columbus II - B (2068 km) - 2500 MB/s

2. West Palm Beach, Florida, United States
3. Magens Bay, St. Thomas, U.S. Virgin Islands

- Columbus II - C (9116 km) - 560 MB/s

3. Magens Bay, St. Thomas, U.S. Virgin Islands
4. Funchal, Madeira, Portugal
5. Sardina, Gran Canaria, Spain
6. Palermo, Sicily, Italy

== See also ==
- Communication source
