= TCS-1 =

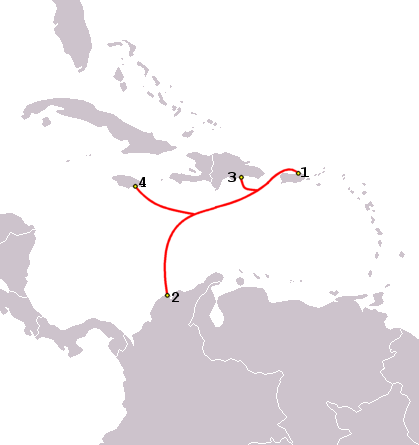

TCS-1 (Transcaribbean System 1) was an optical submarine telephone cable.

It was installed in 1990, was 2,593km in length and had a capacity of 280 Mbit/s. Service was ended on 9 January 2004. It was owned and maintained by AT&T, MCI and Sprint

It had landing points in:

1. San Juan, Puerto Rico
2. Barranquilla, Colombia
3. Santo Domingo, Dominican Republic
4. Kingston, Jamaica

== See also ==
- List of international submarine communications cables
