= New Cross Pacific Cable System =

Submarine cable system in the North Pacific Ocean

The New Cross Pacific Cable System (NCP) is a cable system in the Pacific Ocean. The NCP cable system consists seven fiber pairs, initially deploying with 100Gbps DWDM technology and a total design capacity of 70Tbps.

The NCP consortium comprises China Telecom, China Mobile, China Unicom, Chunghwa Telecom, KT Corporation, Softbank and Microsoft, which signed Construction and Maintenance Agreement in October 2014. The Supply Contract for NCP cable system was awarded to TE SubCom.

Its landing points are in:

- Chongming, China
- Nanhui New City and Lingang, China
- Maruyama, Japan
- Busan, South Korea
- Toucheng, Taiwan
- Pacific City, Oregon, in the United States

== See also ==
- Pacific Light Cable Network
