= Americas II =

AMERICAS-II is a fiber optic submarine communications cable that carries telecommunications between Florida, the U.S. Virgin Islands, Puerto Rico, Martinique, Curaçao, Trinidad and Tobago, Venezuela, French Guiana, Suriname and Guyana (both through Cayenne), and Brazil. It has been in service since August 2000 and is operated on a common carrier basis.

AMERICAS-II consists of three interconnected rings (North, South, and West Systems), each operating at 2.5 gigabits per second ( Gbit/s), initially in separate collapsed ring configurations, and a dedicated link between Curaçao and Venezuela not operating in a collapsed ring configuration. Each fiber pair in each of the three systems will have a capacity of thirty-two 155 megabits per second ( Mbit/s) OC-3 Basic System Modules (BSM), with each BSM containing 63 Minimum Investment Units (MIUs) and equipped at the outset for a capacity of 1008 MIUs. Its initial total rate of 40 Gbit/s increased in 2009 to 160 Gbit/s and again 2010 to an unknown rate.

== Landing points ==
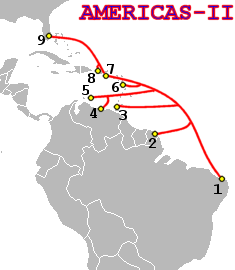

1. Fortaleza, Brazil
2. Cayenne, French Guiana
3. Chaguaramas, Trinidad and Tobago
4. Camuri, Venezuela
5. Willemstad, Curaçao
6. Le Lamentin, Martinique
7. Saint Croix, U.S. Virgin Islands
8. Miramar, San Juan, Puerto Rico
9. Hollywood, Florida, United States

== See also ==
- List of international submarine communications cables
