= APCN =

Submarine telecommunications cable system linking nine Asian countries

APCN or Asia-Pacific Cable Network is a submarine telecommunications cable system linking nine Asian countries.

It has landing points in:

- Petchaburi, Thailand
- Mersing, Malaysia
- Changi, Singapore
- Ancol, Indonesia
- Lantau, Hong Kong
- Batangas, Philippines
- Toucheng, Taiwan
- Busan, Korea
- Miyazaki, Japan

It has a transmission capacity of 5 Gbit/s, and a total cable length of approximately 12,000 km. It started operations in 1997.

== See also ==
- APCN 2
- List of international submarine communications cables
- Cable landing point

== Sources ==
- "www.apricot.net/apricot97/apII/Presentations/KDDSubmarineFiber/sld018.htm". Archived from the original on 10 February 2006.
- "www.nec.co.jp/press/en/0103/0801-02.html". Archived from the original on 4 October 2018.
- "www.atlantic-cable.com/Cables/CableTimeLine/index1951.htm". Archived from the original on 8 December 2008.
