= Asia Submarine Cable Express =

Underwater cable system

The Asia Submarine Cable Express (ASE) is a 7200 kilometer long underwater cable system launched for service in 2012 which connects Japan, Hong Kong, the Philippines, Malaysia, and Singapore.
