= SJC (cable system) =

Southeast Asia-Japan Cable System (SJC) is a pan-Asia submarine communications cable system connecting Japan, China, Hong Kong, the Philippines, Brunei, Thailand, Singapore and Indonesia. The SJC cable consists of six fiber pairs, with an initial design capacity of over 15 Tbit/s which can be upgraded to 23 Tbit/s. The SJC cable system utilizes state-of-the-art advanced 40G SLTE and OADM Branching technologies. The SJC is operational on June 27, 2013.

== Cable landing stations ==
It will have cable landing points at:

- Mainland China (at Shantou)
- Hong Kong (at Chung Hom Kok)
- Viet Nam
- Japan (at Chikura)
- Philippines (at Nasugbu, Batangas)
- Brunei (at Telisai)
- Thailand (at Songkhla)
- Singapore (at Tuas)
