= Black Sea Fiber-Optic Cable System =

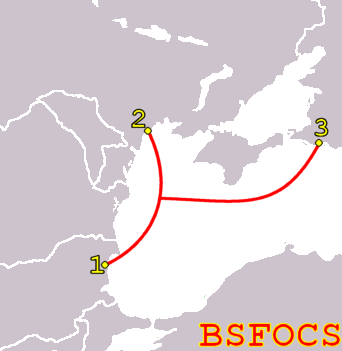

The Black Sea Fiber-Optic Cable System (BSFOCS) is a 1,300 km (808 mi) submarine telecommunications cable system linking three countries bordering the Black Sea. It went into operation in September 2001, and has a total capacity of 20 Gbit/s along 2 fiber pairs.

It has landing points in:

1. Varna, Bulgaria
2. Odesa, Ukraine
3. Novorossiysk, Russia
