= GlobeNet =

GlobeNet is a wholesale telecom operator that connects the Americas with various services (Network, IP, Data Center and Security), supported by its 26,000-kilometer (16,000 mi) subsea cable system and IT infrastructure.

The subsea cable system has landing points in:

1. Tuckerton, New Jersey, USA
2. Boca Raton, Florida, USA
3. St David's, Bermuda
4. Maiquetia, Venezuela
5. Fortaleza, Brazil
6. Praia Grande, Brazil
7. Rio de Janeiro, Brazil
8. Barranquilla, Colombia
9. Las Toninas, Argentina

Over the last year, the company has set up a data center in Barranquilla (Colombia), a major interconnection point (IX) in Fortaleza (Brazil) and a new subsea cable to Argentina, called Malbec.

== Ownership ==
GlobeNet is a private company, part of BTG Pactual's Infrastructure Fund II. BTG Pactual is one of the most important investment banks in Latin America.
