= ALPAL-2 =

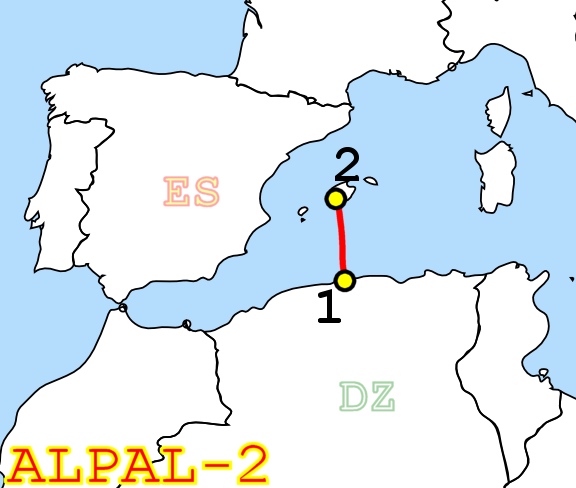

ALPAL-2 is a submarine telecommunications cable system in the Mediterranean Sea linking Algeria and the Spanish Balearic island of Mallorca.

It has landing points in:

1. El Djemila, Algiers, Algeria
2. Ses Covetes, Palma de Mallorca, Mallorca, Spain

It has a design transmission capacity of 160 Gbit/s, starting operation at 5 Gbit/s and a total cable length of 312 km. It started operation in July 2002.
