= Pacific Caribbean Cable System =

Pacific Caribbean Cable System (PCCS) is an optical submarine communications cable which connects the United States with several countries of the Caribbean. It was put into operation in September 2015.

The cable runs from Florida to the east coast of Panama, connecting several countries. From the west side of Panama it continues to Ecuador. The cable is 6000 km long and has a bandwidth capacity of 80 Tbit/s.

== Landing points ==
- Balboa, Panama
- Cartagena, Colombia
- Hudishibana, Aruba
- Jacksonville, United States
- Manta, Ecuador
- Maria Chiquita, Panama
- San Juan, United States
- Tera Corá, Curacao
- Tortola, British Virgin Islands
