= PacRimWest =

PacRimWest was a twin-pair 560 Mbit/s optical submarine telecommunications cable which served as Australia's main link to the world along with its partner cables Tasman2 (connecting Australia to New Zealand) and PacRimEast (connecting New Zealand to Hawaii).

PacRimWest was constructed in 1994 and was ready for service in June, and came into service on 31 January 1995 connecting Australia and Guam. It was withdrawn from service in 2005.

The PacRimWest, Tasman2 and PacRimEast cables were designed at the very beginning of the internet era when the vast bulk of traffic was voice, fax and video for the television networks, with very limited requirement for data.

The cables fairly quickly reached their capacity of 560 Mbit/s on each of the fibre pairs leading to the requirement for the building of JASURAUS (5 Gbit/s) two years later. Around a year after Jasuraus became active, it too approached its capacity with Telstra being part of the consortium building SEA-ME-WE 3 (40 Gbit/s).

The PacRimWest and Eastern cables were part of the South Pacific Network of Cables. The South Pacific Network linked Australia and New Zealand with Hawaii and Guam and connected with networks in the United States, Europe, Japan and South East Asia. It meant a great leap in Australia's international links, being able to handle around 80,000 voice circuits (phone calls), a great increase on the 1984 built ANZCAN cable it superseded which could handle only 1,380 voice circuits.

The PacRim survey was one of the largest international contracts ever awarded to an individual survey company. It totaled nearly $7 million and was spread over 18 months.

PacRimWest at the time was the longest continuous submarine cable laid to that date at 7,062 km (4,414 miles) and one of the most trailblazing cables passing through the Mariana Trench near Guam at a depth of 8,900m (29,000 feet). The cable used only 53 repeaters with spacing at around 135 km (84 miles).

Part of the rationale behind the PacRim network was to bring much of the region's telecommunications traffic to Australia, forming a regional telecommunications and technology hub. The largest shareholder was OTC, Australia's international carrier and around 70 percent of the cable was manufactured in Australia.

The Network was designed to have an operational life of 25 years, but became obsolete within only three years with the building of Jasuraus, although after decommissioning in 2005 the cable was cut near the Solomon Islands and relaid to form APNG-2 in 2006 connecting Sydney and Papua New Guinea, saving PNG around 80% of the cost of building a new cable and plant with the equipment from the Guam landing station being moved to PNG.

The Tasman-2 cable (built in 1992) covered the distance of 2,000 km with three fibre pairs, and joined Sydney and Auckland. From there the 7,855 km (4,900 miles) PacRimEast cable (built in 1993) connected New Zealand to Keawaula in Hawaii.

The cost of the three cables combined was around AUD$500m.

== See also ==
- List of international submarine communications cables
