= RJK =

Submarine telecommunications cable system

RJK (Russia-Japan-Korea) is a submarine telecommunications cable system linking Russia, Japan, and South Korea, all of which border the Sea of Japan. It began operation in January 1995. On Monday, August 16, 2010, Rostelecom (Russian telecommunications company) announced a transfer of ownership of the undersea cable to the Russian Institute of Pacific Oceanology, with the intended use for research on geomagnetic fields and ceasing any telecommunication use on the line.

It has landing points in:

- Nakhodka, Russia - Rostelecom
- Naoetsu, Japan - KDDI
- Busan, South Korea - KT Corporation

It has a transmission capacity of 560 Mbps per fiber optic pair, totaling to 1.12 Gbps over both pairs. The total cable length is 1,715 km (1,066 mi).

Since the transfer of ownership, the RJCN has arisen as the primary telecommunication cable between Russia and Japan. This new generation of subsea cable is rated for 1.28 Tbps data transfer (640 Gbps per pair), beginning service in 5 September 2008.
