= ULYSSES (cable system) =

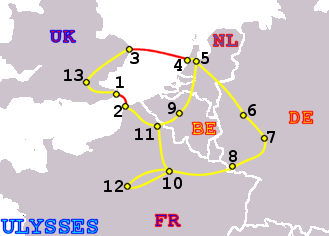
- Owners: WorldCom International, BT, France Telecom and KPN
- Landing points ULYSSES-1: 1. St Margaret's Bay, Kent, United Kingdom; 2. Calais, France; ULYSSES-2: 3. Lowestoft, Suffolk, United Kingdom; 4. Near IJmuiden, the Netherlands
- Date of first use: 1997

ULYSSES is a submarine communications cable network divided into two sections: ULYSSES-1 and ULYSSES-2 that transit the English Channel and the North Sea, respectively. It carries telecommunications and internet signals to-and-from the United Kingdom to the continental European Union. It began service in 1997 and is owned by WorldCom International, BT, France Telecom and KPN.

== Network ==
ULYSSES-1 has landing points in:
1. St Margaret's Bay, Kent, United Kingdom
2. Calais, Pas-de-Calais, France

ULYSSES-2 has landing points in:
3. Lowestoft, Suffolk, United Kingdom
4. Near IJmuiden, North Holland, the Netherlands

The route then continues inland into mainland Europe and joins the two cables together at:
5. Amsterdam, Netherlands
6. Düsseldorf, Germany
7. Frankfurt, Germany
8. Saarbrücken, Germany
9. Brussels, Belgium
10. Reims, France
11. Fresnes-lès-Montauban, France
12. Paris, France

And from the two UK landing points the cable connects together at:
13. London, UK
