= HUGO (cable system) =

Submarine communications cable

HUGO (High capacity, Undersea Guernsey Optical-fibre) is a submarine telecommunications cable linking the United Kingdom, the Channel Islands, and France.

== Cable ==
It has landing points in:

1. Porthcurno, Cornwall, England, the United Kingdom
2. Pembroke, Vale Parish, Guernsey, the Channel Islands
3. Saints Bay, St Martin Parish, Guernsey, the Channel Islands
4. Lannion, Côtes-d'Armor, Brittany, France

HUGO East, a separate cable system, includes a direct connection between Jersey and France, and another to Guernsey. HUGO East makes use of the fibre optics within the cable that supplies both Jersey and Guernsey with power.

In November 2016 a ship, possibly the LPG tanker "King Arthur", dragging an anchor, cut all three communication cables connecting Guernsey to England, just north of Alderney. All Channel Island communications were diverted using the CIEG and HUGO East connections to France.
