= VSNL Western Europe =

Telecommunications cable system

VSNL Western Europe (previously TGN Western Europe) is a telecommunications cable system with both submarine and terrestrial parts linking several counties in western Europe.

The cable system is constructed from cables with 4 fibre pairs per cable, and each fibre pair supports 96 10 Gbit/s waves at construction, allowing for a total lit capacity (at construction) of 4 fibre pairs x 96 10 Gbit/s waves = 3,840 Gbit/s.

It has two submarine cables, one with landing points in:

- Seixal, District of Setúbal, Portugal
- Highbridge, Somerset, United Kingdom

and the other with landing points in

- Bilbao, Biscay, Spain
- Highbridge, Somerset, United Kingdom

The Seixal and Bilbao landing points are interconnected terrestrially via Lisbon, Portugal and Madrid, Spain. Highbridge is connected via a pair of cables to London, United Kingdom
