= REMBRANDT-2 =

Retired UK-Netherlands telecoms cable system

REMBRANDT-2 is a submarine telecommunications cable system linking the United Kingdom and the Netherlands across the southern North Sea. It is no longer in use.

It has landing points in:

- Joss Bay, England, UK
- Domburg, Netherlands
