= REMBRANDT-1 =

Submarine communications cable

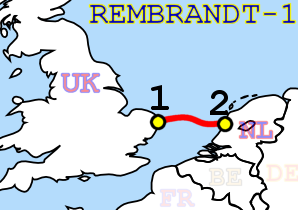

REMBRANDT-1 was a Submarine communications cable system linking the United Kingdom and the Netherlands across the southern North Sea.

It has landing points in:

1. Pakefield, England, UK
2. Bakkum, Netherlands
