= Matrix Cable System =

Submarine communications cable connecting Indonesia and Singapore

The Matrix Cable System (MCS) is a submarine telecommunications cable linking Indonesia (Jakarta and Batam) and Singapore with a 2nd phase to Landing at Perth, Australia. It was constructed by Tyco (TE Subcom).

It has landing points in:

- Pantai Mutiara, Jakarta, Indonesia
- Batu Besar, Batam, Indonesia
- Changi, Singapore, Singapore

== About MCS ==
Matrix Cable System is jointly owned and operated by PT NAPInfo Lintas Nusa and Matrix Networks PTE LTD.

Matrix Cable System is initially built with 4 fiber pairs between Singapore and Jakarta, and 4 fiber pairs between Singapore and Batam with a total distance of 1055 km.

The total bandwidth capacity of the MCS Cable System is 5.12 Tbit/s, made up of 8 pairs of optical fibers, each pair providing 640 Gbit/s by Dense Wavelength Division Multiplexing of 40 Gbit/s wavelengths. The 1,000 km-long undersea fully buried cable system is built in a self-healing ring configuration. The cable system began being operational in mid-2008.

MCS also owns and operates onward connectivity from its landing stations and terrestrial network to various major POP in both Singapore and Jakarta. In Singapore, MCS sells capacity via its POP in Global Switch, Geo Tele (Savvis), Equinix, and BT Front Line (Chai Chee). In Jakarta, MCS connects to Cyber Building and NAPInfo's own Data Center in Kuningan Plaza.

Matrix Cable system started commercial services on 08-08-08.
