= Tangerine (cable system) =

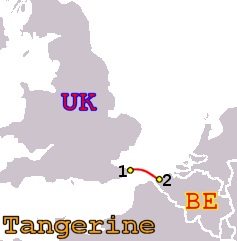

Tangerine is a submarine telecommunications cable system segment. It crosses the English Channel, linking the United Kingdom and Belgium.

It has landing points in:

1. Dumpton Gap, Broadstairs, Kent, United Kingdom
2. Mariakerke near Ostend, West Flanders, Belgium

The cable contains four fibre bundles, each of 48 fibres, and a total cable length of 121 km.
