= Global Coalition on Telecommunications =

Global Coalition on Telecommunications (GCOT)
- Formation: October 2023
- Type: International coalition
- Purpose: Telecommunications security, 6G development, and supply chain resilience
- Members: United Kingdom; United States; Japan; Australia; Canada; Sweden (since 2026)

The Global Coalition on Telecommunications (GCOT) is an international multilateral partnership established to foster cooperation on the security, resilience, and innovation of telecommunications networks. Originally formed in October 2023 by the United Kingdom, the United States, Japan, Australia, and Canada, the coalition serves as a forum for leading nations to align their policies on critical communication infrastructure.

== History ==
The coalition was launched following a joint declaration by its five founding members, who identified a need for deeper international coordination in response to the rapid evolution of 5G and future 6G technologies. In March 2026, Sweden formally joined the GCOT during Mobile World Congress in Barcelona. And in May 2026, the European Union became its first strategic partner.

The primary mission of the GCOT is to ensure the stability and security of global telecommunications supply chains. Its activities focus on several key pillars, featuring 6G development, security and resilience and information sharing, facilitating the exchange of technical expertise and best practices between member states to promote "vendor diversity" and avoid over-reliance on single suppliers.

== See also ==
- 6G (network)
- Open Radio Access Network (Open RAN)
- Five Eyes
- International Telecommunication Union
