= Mauritius–Rodrigues Submarine Cable =

Optical fiber cable connecting islands in Mauritius

Mauritius–Rodrigues Submarine Cable (MARS)
- Owners: Mauritius Telecom
- Landing points: La Prairie, Mauritius; Grand Baie, Rodrigues
- Total length: 720 km
- Design capacity: 8 Tbit/s
- Currently lit capacity: 100 Gbit/s
- Date of first use: March 2019
- Website: Official website

The Mauritius–Rodrigues Submarine Cable (MARS) is the first optical fiber submarine communications cable linking Mauritius to Rodrigues.

It was commissioned in November 2017 by the Government of Mauritius. The project was awarded to Mauritius Telecom and executed by PCCW Global with Huawei Marine as the installer. The MARS submarine cable has a design capacity of 8 Terabits per second and an initial lit capacity of 100 Gigabits per second.

The MARS cable is deployed with a no-burial laying methodology. It consists of two fibre pairs and six submarine repeaters using the dense wavelength division multiplexing transmission technology.

The laying of the submarine cable started on the 6 November 2018 at La Prairie, Mauritius and was connected to Rodrigues on the 17 November 2018. The cable is expected to be ready for service in March 2019.

Upon activation, the MARS cable would produce a 500-fold increase in bandwidth to Rodrigues, which has until now only been connected to the outside world through satellites.

The MARS cable has landing points at:

1. La Prairie, Mauritius
2. Grand Baie, Rodrigues
