= Concerto 1 =

Submarine telecommunications cable system

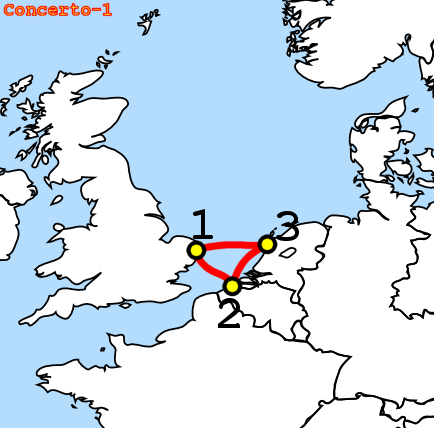

Concerto 1 is a submarine telecommunications cable system in the North Sea connecting the UK, Netherlands and Belgium. Concerto 1 was built in 1999 by Alcatel for Flute ltd, part of the Interoute group.

It is a triangular system with three submarine segments – Concerto 1 North, Concerto 1 South and Concerto 1 East

Concerto 1 North has landing points at:
1. near Thorpeness, England, United Kingdom
3. near Zandvoort, Netherlands

Concerto 1 South has landing points at:
1. near Thorpeness, England, United Kingdom
2. near Zeebrugge, Flanders, Belgium

Concerto 1 East has landing points at:
3. near Zandvoort, Netherlands
2. near Zeebrugge, Flanders, Belgium

Note that there are two landing points at each location – the landing points are not at exactly the same points.
