= SMPR-1 =

St. Maarten Puerto Rico-1 (SMPR-1) is an 8-pair non-repeated submarine telecommunications cable system of 375 km which uses wavelength-division multiplexing (WDM) technology to link St. Maarten and Puerto Rico.

It has landing points in:

- 6 pairs for St. Maarten International Telephone company (SMITCOM)'s facilities in Philipsburg, St. Maarten
- 2 pairs for Dauphin Telecom's facilities on Baie Longue beach, in the French part of St. Martin
- Ultracom's facilities in Isla Verde, Puerto Rico

The initial capacity on the SMPR-1 is 2.5 Gbit/s per fiber and is expandable to 20 Gbit/s on 8 fibers. November 2009 SMITCOM chooses Nokia Siemens Network to deploy Coriant hiT 7300 DWDM Long-haul platform. The platform is up-gradable to 40 Gbit/s per wavelength. which brings the maximum capacity to 240 Gbit/s for the Dutch side. The platform has recently been upgraded to 10 Gbit/s and now provides over 5 Gbit/s of IP transit to St.Maarten.
