= Monet (submarine cable) =

Submarine communications cable between Brazil and US

- Cable type: Subsea fibre optic telecommunications
- Fate: In operation
- Construction beginning: Q4 2014
- Construction finished: Q4 2017
- First traffic: Dec 2017
- Design capacity: 64 TBit/s
- Built by: TE SubCom
- Landing points: Praia Grande, Brazil; Fortaleza, Brazil; Boca Raton, United States
- Area served: United States and Brazil
- Owner(s): Algar Telecom, Angola Cables, ANTEL, Google

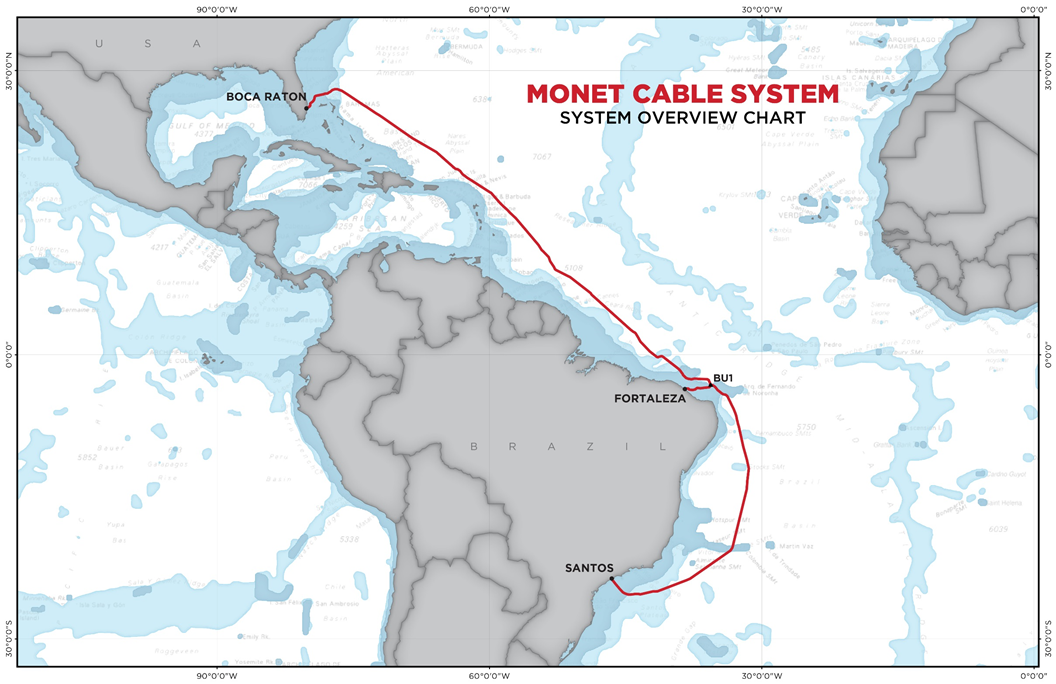
Monet cable route

The MONET cable system is a subsea fibre optic telecommunications cable completed in December 2017. Final splicing occurred in November 2016. Monet connects the cities of Praia Grande and Fortaleza in Brazil with Boca Raton in the United States.

TE SubCom was the selected provider for the project.

The cable is 10,556 kilometres (6,560 mi) long and has six fibre pairs with an initial capacity of 64 Tbit/s (Terabits per second). The cable is operated by four telecommunications companies: Algar Telecom, Angola Cables, ANTEL, and Google.

Equinix was selected by the Monet Submarine Cable investors to provide U.S. facilities and services for the cable landing station, terminating in the U.S. at Equinix's MI3 International Business Exchange data center.
