= Hawaiki Cable =

Submarine communications cable

- Cable type: Fibre-optic
- Construction beginning: September 2017
- Construction finished: April 2018
- First traffic: July 2018
- Design capacity: 43.8 Tbps
- Built by: TE SubCom
- Landing points: Sydney, Australia; Mangawhai Heads, New Zealand; Grande Terre, New Caledonia; Isle of Pines, New Caledonia; Vavaʻu, Tonga; Kapolei, Hawaii; Pacific City, Oregon, United States
- Owner(s): BW Digital

Hawaiki Cable is a 15,000-kilometre (9,300 mi) fibre-optic submarine communications cable that entered service in July 2018, linking Australia, New Zealand and the United States with branches to American Samoa, New Caledonia and Tonga. The cable has three fibre pairs across its main segments, and had an initial design capacity of 43.8 terabits per second.

Hawaiki Cable is owned and operated by BW Digital.

== History ==
Hawaiki Cable was founded by former Alcatel-Lucent executive Remi Galasso, who announced the project at the 2012 Pacific Islands Forum in Rarotonga. The original cable design provided a 30Tbps link from Auckland to Hawaii, with branches to Sydney and seven Pacific Islands including American Samoa, New Caledonia, Norfolk Island, Wallis, and an expected completion in late 2014.

In August 2013, TPG Telecom committed to 3Tbps of capacity on the cable. In October 2013, iiNet also committed to 3Tbps of capacity.

In July 2014, REANNZ signed an 25-year anchor tenancy contract for capacity on the cable.

Despite pre-commitments for capacity, the cable struggled to obtain financing and in September 2015 the project sought US$150million in investment to commence construction. Total construction costs were estimated to be approximately US$300 million.

In April 2016, Hawaiki Cable announced that project funding had been secured and that the construction contract between with TE SubCom had come into force. Construction was expected to be completed by mid-2018. The landing point in Sydney would be provided by Equinix and the landing point at Pacific City to be connected to Hillsboro.

Manufacturing of the cable was completed in September 2017. The final design of the cable removed the direct Sydney to Auckland link, with the cable instead originating at Sydney and having a trunk link to Mangawhai Heads. A spur was included to link American Samoa, and branching units were pre-installed to allow for later connections to New Caledonia, Fiji, and Tonga. Marine operations commenced in November 2017 with cable ships CS Responder installing the Southern leg from Sydney to Hawaii, and CS Global Sentinel installing the Northern leg from Hawaii to Oregon.

The final landing of the cable was completed on 23 April 2018, and commercial operations commenced on 19 July.

By June 2020, the cable design capacity had been increased to 67 Tbps.

On 27 July 2021, Hawaiki Cable was sold to BW Digital. The sale was formally completed on 16 May 2022.

On 10 January 2024, BW Digital and Ciena announced the availability of 400GbE services on the cable.

On 30 May 2025, BW Digital and Ciena announced that the cable had achieved 1.2 Tbit/s of transmission per wavelength between Hawaii and Oregon.

== Branches ==
=== Tomoo Cable ===
On 2 December 2019, Hawaiki signed a contract with Société Calédonienne de Connectivité Internationale (SCCI) to construct and install a 700 km (430 mi) branch to New Caledonia. To be operated by SCCI, Tomoo Cable included connections to both Grande Terre and Isle of Pines.

=== Tuʻi Vavaʻu ===
On 21 June 2024, BW Digital announced construction of the 405 km (252 mi) Tonga Hawaiki Branch System, which would connect Tonga to the Hawaiki Cable. The new cable would provide a second link to Tonga, in addition to the Tonga Cable System between Tonga and Fuji, with the US$32 million cost being jointly funded by Australian Department of Foreign Affairs and Trade and Government of New Zealand.

The cable was renamed to Tuʻi Vavaʻu and commissioned on 26 May 2026.

== Landing points ==
1. Equinix SY4, Alexandria, Sydney, New South Wales, Australia
2. Mangawhai Heads, New Zealand
3. Grande Terre, New Caledonia
4. Isle of Pines, New Caledonia
5. Vavaʻu, Tonga
6. Kapolei, Hawaii
7. Pacific City, Oregon, United States

== See also ==
- List of international submarine communications cables
