= BARSAV =

Fiber optic submarine communications cable

BARSAV was a fiber optic submarine communications cable system that linked Barcelona (Spain) with Savona (Italy). It was about 760 km long, was built in 1996 and removed from the seabed in 2018.

It was owned by Telefónica and Telecom Italia. The cable was laid by Alcatel Submarine Networks. The cable consisted of two segments. The first segment from Barcelona (Cabrera de Mar) was 260 km long, the second segment was 500 km long and ended in Savona.
