= PIPE Networks =

Australian telecommunications company

PIPE Networks Limited
- Type: Subsidiary
- Industry: Telecommunications
- Founded: 2001
- Founder: Bevan Slattery, Steve Baxter
- Headquarters: Brisbane, Australia
- Key people: Bevan Slattery, Managing Director and Co-founder
- Owner: Vocus Group
- Parent: Macquarie Group, Aware Super 50/50
- Website: pipenetworks.com

PIPE Networks (also known as PIPE) is an Australian telecommunications company based in Brisbane, Queensland. It is a subsidiary of Vocus Group. Its primary business is establishing peering exchanges. PIPE stands for "Public Internet Peering Exchange". The company also offers services such as co-location, telehousing, and fibre networks.

PIPE listed on the then Australian Stock Exchange on 17 May 2005 as PIPE Networks Limited, with the stock code: PWK.

Australian ISPs that utilise PIPE's metropolitan fibre networks include iiNet, Internode, and iPrimus, among others.

In March 2010, shareholders accepted a takeover offer from TPG Telecom Limited.

In October 2024, Vocus Group proposed the $5.25 billion acquisition of TPG Telecom’s EGW fixed business and fibre assets, including PIPE Networks. The sale was finalised on 31 July 2025.

== Peering exchanges ==
PIPE currently runs six metropolitan exchange networks.

City	First opened	Number of sites
Brisbane	May 2002	4
Sydney	January 2003	6
Adelaide	January 2003	2
Melbourne	July 2003	4
Hobart	August 2003	2
Canberra	June 2004	1

== PIPE International ==
In January 2008, PIPE Networks announced it would be constructing a $200 million international link, known as PPC-1 (Pipe Pacific Cable), from Sydney to Guam. The link connects Madang in Papua New Guinea. It is operated by a newly formed PIPE subsidiary, PIPE International.

In April 2008, PIPE Networks entered into a joint venture with New Zealand-based Kordia to build an undersea fibre optic cable between New Zealand and Australia. This cable was to be known as PPC-2. As of 2024, this link has yet to appear.

== Takeover offer ==
In March 2010, shareholders voted to accept a $373 million takeover offer by TPG Telecom Ltd. for $6.30 per share (TPG Annual Report 2010, p48). The takeover was subject to approval by the Queensland Supreme Court. Shares of TPG rose 11 per cent after the news was released.

This takeover was approved by the Supreme Court of Queensland on Wednesday, 17th March 2010.

== See also ==
- Internet in Australia
- List of Internet exchange points
- Pipe Pacific Cable
