= APCN 2 =

Submarine communications cable

APCN 2 or Asia-Pacific Cable Network 2 is a submarine telecommunications cable linking several countries in the Asia-Pacific region.

It has landing points in:

- Chongming, Shanghai, China
- Shantou, Guangdong Province, China
- Lantau Island, Islands District, Hong Kong
- Chikura, Chiba Prefecture, Japan
- Kitaibaraki, Ibaraki Prefecture, Japan
- Tamsui, New Taipei City, Taiwan
- Kuantan, Pahang State, Malaysia
- Batangas Bay, Batangas City, Batangas, Philippines
- Katong, Singapore
- Busan, South Korea

== Performance ==
Total bandwidth capacity of Asia Pacific Cable Network 2 is 2.56 Tbit/s, made up of four pairs of optical fibres, each pair providing 640 Gbit/s by Dense Wavelength Division Multiplexing of 10 Gbit/s wavelengths. The 19,000 km-long APCN 2 cable system is built in a self-healing ring configuration, which allows fast rerouting of data transfers along APCN 2 in the event of disruptions. The cable system, as of January 2007, is progressively becoming operational. APCN 2 is designed to provide interconnection with other major trans-oceanic cable networks linking the US, Europe, Australia, and other parts of Asia.

== Damage ==
On 27 Dec 2006, the 2006 Hengchun earthquake damaged the APCN 2 cable links between Shantou, China and Tanshui, Taiwan, and between Lantau Island in Hong Kong and Chongming, China. This disrupted Internet access to overseas websites from Asia for more than a month.

On 12 Aug 2009, the APCN2 cable suffered further damage, impacting Hong Kong, China, Taiwan, Philippines, Singapore and Tokyo links.

In June 2010, the cable suffered some major faults, disrupting the Internet Access in the Philippines.

On 11 March 2011, the APCN2 cable suffered damage as part of the 2011 Tōhoku earthquake.

On 23 March 2014, the APCN2 cable damaged after existing submarine cable break at S4A that happened on March 21.

On 7 January 2015, the APCN2 cable failure between Singapore and Asia Pacific. This outage resulted in bandwidth restrictions and significant latency issues in Singapore to Asia Pacific from 7 January 2015 outage resolved on 31 January 2015 (source: Singtel / Singnet TAC) date=2015-01-29

On April 22, 2017, damage to the APCN2 cable affected Taiwan internet users.

On April 10, 2020, damage to the APCN2 cable affected Internet users in Malaysia and nearby countries.

== See also ==
- APCN
- List of international submarine communications cables
