= Telstra Endeavour =

Submarine cable system connecting Sydney and Hawaii

Coordinates: 21.554019°N 158.242889°W

- Cable type: Fibre-optic
- Fate: Active
- First traffic: October 2008
- Design capacity: 1.28 Tbit/s
- Lit capacity: 100 Gbit/s
- Built by: Alcatel-Lucent
- Landing points: Tamarama Beach, Sydney; Waianae, Hawaii
- Area served: Pacific Ocean
- Owner(s): Telstra
- Website: Telstra Endeavour Cable

The Telstra Endeavour is a submarine cable connecting Sydney and Hawaii. The cable went live in October 2008, with a capacity of 1.28 terabits per second in the future (currently at 100 gigabits per second). It was proposed on 28 March 2007 by Telstra, the largest telecommunications carrier in Australia.

Initially with a lit capacity of 80 Gbit/s, Telstra announced an increased capacity to 100 Gbit/s in January 2015.

== Landing points ==
The landing points are:

- Tamarama Beach, Sydney, Australia, with termination at Paddington
- Keawaula, Waianae, Hawaii

== History ==
Telstra announced that the cable would connect Sydney and Hawaii with a 9,000 km (5,600 mi) link, the largest ever built and owned by an Australian company, providing a transmission capacity of 1.28 terabit/s to Hawaii. The cable will be linked to others from Hawaii to the US mainland.

The manufacture and laying of the cable was the responsibility of Alcatel-Lucent, through its subsidiary Alcatel Submarine Networks, which also supplied Telstra's two cables across Bass Strait and its Tasman Sea (Tasman 2) cable. Alcatel-Lucent is basing this turn-key project on the "Alcatel 1620 Light Manager" submarine line termination equipment that uses dense wavelength-division multiplexing (DWDM). No cost was revealed, however it is estimated around $300 million (AUD).

== See also ==
- List of international submarine communications cables
