= G-P =

Pacific submarine communications cable

- Landing points: Batangas Bay, the Philippines; Tanguisson Point, Tumon Village, Guam
- Total length: 3,600 km (2,200 mi)
- Design capacity: 20 Gbit/s
- Date of first use: 31 March 1999; 26 years ago

G-P (or Guam-Philippines Fiber Optic Submarine Cable System) is a submarine telecommunications cable system in the North Pacific Ocean linking the two named territories.

It has landing points in:

- Batangas Bay, Batangas City, Batangas Province, the Philippines
- Tanguisson Point, Tumon Village, Guam

It has a design transmission capacity of 20 Gbit/s, starting operation at 5 Gbit/s and a total cable length of 3,600 km (2,200 mi). It started operation on 31 March 1999.

== Sources ==
- "Application for a license to land and operate in the United States a private fiber optic cable system extending between Guam and the Philippines, the G-P Cable System". fcc.gov. 15 December 1998.
