= RIOJA-1 =

RIOJA-1 was a submarine telecommunications cable linking the United Kingdom and Spain across the North Atlantic Ocean.

It had landing points in:

- Porthcurno, Cornwall, United Kingdom
- Virgen del Mar Beach, Santander, Spain

It was withdrawn from service on October 13, 2006.

== Sources ==
- "The Kingfisher Information Service – Offshore Renewable & Cable Awareness project". KIS-ORCA. 2019-03-22. Archived from the original on March 15, 2013.
- "RSL COM Buys Into Rioja 2 and 3 European Cables". thefreelibrary.com. 1998-10-29. Archived from the original on 2016-03-16.
