= HANTRU-1 =

Coordinates: 8.7447°N 167.7367°E

HANTRU-1 is a submarine communications cable system that connects the Ronald Reagan Ballistic Missile Defense Test Site in the Kwajalein atoll to Guam. The cable was funded by $100 million from the US Army. Marshall Islands and Federated States of Micronesia arranged to add extensions to this trunk line for total of $30 million. It has cable landing points at:

- Guam
- Pohnpei, Federated States of Micronesia
- Reagan Test Site, Kwajalein Atoll
- Ebeye Island, Kwajalein Atoll
- Majuro, Marshall Islands

HANTRU-1 is named after owner Hannon Armstrong Capital LLC and operator Truestone LLC. The dedicated Micronesian fiber pair will have an ultimate capacity to transmit 16 10-Gigabit wavelengths. The HANTRU-1 extensions were completed in March 2010. Previously connectivity to these island nations was only available using satellite transmission.
