= APNG-2 =

Submarine communications cable

The APNG-2 submarine communications cable was constructed to link Papua New Guinea directly to Australia and indirectly to New Zealand and the rest of the world. Built as a collaboration between Telikom PNG, Telstra, and Telecom New Zealand, it replaced the APNG-1 cable, a coaxial copper cable of 16 Mbit/s.

APNG-2 entered service in 2006, was retired on 14 February 2021.

== Construction ==
APNG-2 reused part of the optical fibre cable that formerly linked Australia to Guam.

=== Recovery and relaying ===
An 1,800 km (1,100 mi) section of the PacRimWest cable was recovered from just south of Guam, with the ship sailing towards the Solomon Islands.

The ship then recovered a loop of the PacRimWest cable off Rockhampton, Queensland, broke it, and spliced it to the Sydney end of the recovered 1,800 km (1,100 mi) section, sailed towards PNG, made landfall at Ela Beach near Port Moresby, where a terminal station from Guam was re-established to link to the Telikom PNG network.

=== Capability ===
PacRimWest is a fibre-optic cable with two fibre pairs. These will be used to provide APNG-2 with around 1100 Mbit/s data capability, consisting of 2 × 565 Mbit/s PDH systems with all electronic regeneration.

== Cost ==
The reuse of the cable is expected to save about 80% of the cost of a new cable: US$11 million v $60 m.

=== Testing ===
A 300 km (190 mi) segment of the PacRimWest cable was recovered and tested from a section south of the intended recovery route. It was found to be sound and suitable for reuse.

=== Cable ship ===
The cable ship being used is CS Ile de Re (named after the French west coast island, Île de Ré.)

== See also ==
- Communications in Papua New Guinea
