= AMX-1 =

Fiber optic submarine communications cable

America Movil Submarine Cable System-1 (AMX-1)
- Fate: In service
- First traffic: RFS 2014
- Owner(s): América Móvil
- Website: www.americamovil.com

The America Movil Submarine Cable System-1 (AMX-1) is a fiber optic submarine communications cable of 17,800 kilometers that extends between the United States, Mexico, Guatemala, Colombia, Dominican Republic, Puerto Rico, Costa Rica and Brazil.

== Information ==
The submarine cable required an investment of 500 million dollars. It connects six countries (Mexico, Guatemala, Colombia, Dominican Republic, Brazil, Costa Rica) and one territory (Puerto Rico) with The United States. The cable has a length of 17,500 kilometers, and ends in Miami, Florida.

== Landing points ==
- Barranquilla, Colombia
- Cancún, Mexico
- Cartagena, Colombia
- Fortaleza, Brazil
- Jacksonville, Florida, United States
- Miami, Florida, United States
- Puerto Barrios, Guatemala
- Puerto Plata, Dominican Republic
- Rio de Janeiro, Brazil
- Salvador, Brazil
- Ponce, Puerto Rico, United States
- Limón, Costa Rica
