= RIOJA-2 =

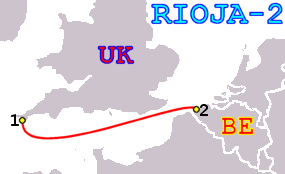
RIOJA-2 route map

RIOJA-2 was a submarine telecommunications cable system linking the United Kingdom and Belgium across the North Atlantic Ocean/English Channel.

It had landing points in:

1. Porthcurno, Cornwall, United Kingdom
2. De Panne, West Flanders, Belgium

It was withdrawn from service on 13 October 2006.
