= Pacific Light Cable Network =

Submarine cable system in the North Pacific Ocean

The Pacific Light Cable Network (PLCN) is a cable system in the Pacific Ocean spanning approximately 13000 kilometers. Partners in the project include Meta Platforms (then known as Facebook) and Google.

The PLCN cable system's initial capacity consists of 6 fiber pairs with a bandwidth of 24 Tbps per fiber pair, totaling 144Tbps for the entire cable system.

== Landing points ==
Its landing points are:

- Baler, Philippines
- Toucheng, Taiwan
- El Segundo, California, in the United States

Cancelled:

- Deep Water Bay, Hong Kong

=== History ===
Pacific Light Data Communication Co. Ltd (PLDC), together with Google and Meta Platforms initiated the project in 2015. By March 2018, the cable system has landed in Deep Water Bay in Hong Kong but its use was subsequently cancelled.

In 2019, it was reported in The Wall Street Journal that U.S. officials were seeking to block the cable citing national security concerns. This comes after a broad shift in U.S. policy towards Chinese participation in telecommunications infrastructure, of which the campaign against Chinese technology giant Huawei is a prominent example. In June 2020, The Committee for the Assessment of Foreign Participation in the U.S. Telecommunications Services Sector (also known as Team Telecom) recommended to grant and deny portions of the application. It recommended denying specifically the direct United States-Hong Kong connection and participation by PLDC and its China-based parent entity Dr. Peng Telecom & Media Group Co., Ltd. and it recommended granting the application as far as connections between the U.S., Taiwan and the Philippines are concerned, subject to Google and Meta Platforms entering into mitigation agreements with the U.S. government. By December 2021, National Security Agreements had been entered into by the U.S. government with Google and Meta Platforms, with the licenses granted in January 2022.
