= SAm-1 =

Optical Submarine Communication Cable

SAm-1 (South America-1) is an optical submarine communications cable. It started operations in 2000, connecting the United States, Puerto Rico, Brazil, Argentina, Chile, Peru and Guatemala. In 2007, SAm-1 was extended to reach Ecuador and Colombia.

It has landing points in:

- Boca Raton, Florida, United States
- Isla Verde, Puerto Rico
- Fortaleza, Brazil
- Salvador, Bahia, Brazil
- Rio de Janeiro, Brazil
- Santos, São Paulo, Brazil
- Las Toninas, Argentina
- Valparaíso, Chile
- Arica, Chile
- Lurín District, Peru
- Máncora, Peru
- Puerto San José, Guatemala
- Puerto Barrios, Guatemala
- Salinas, Ecuador
- Barranquilla, Colombia

When approved in 2000, SAm-1 was to consist of four fiber pairs initially operating at 40 Gbit/s in a self-healing ring configuration, expandable to 48 channels at 10 Gbit/s each, for a total design capacity of 480 Gbit/s, and with multiple upgrade capability using dense wavelength-division multiplexing up to 1.92 terabits per second.
