= RIOJA-3 =

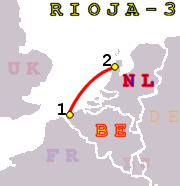

RIOJA-3 was a submarine telecommunications cable system linking the Belgium and the Netherlands across the southern North Sea.

It had landing points in:

1. Oostduinkerke-Bad, Flanders, Belgium
2. Egmond aan Zee, Netherlands

It was withdrawn from service on 13 October 2006

== Sources ==
- Kingfisher information site
- FreeLibrary article
