= PAN AM (cable system) =

Submarine communications cable system

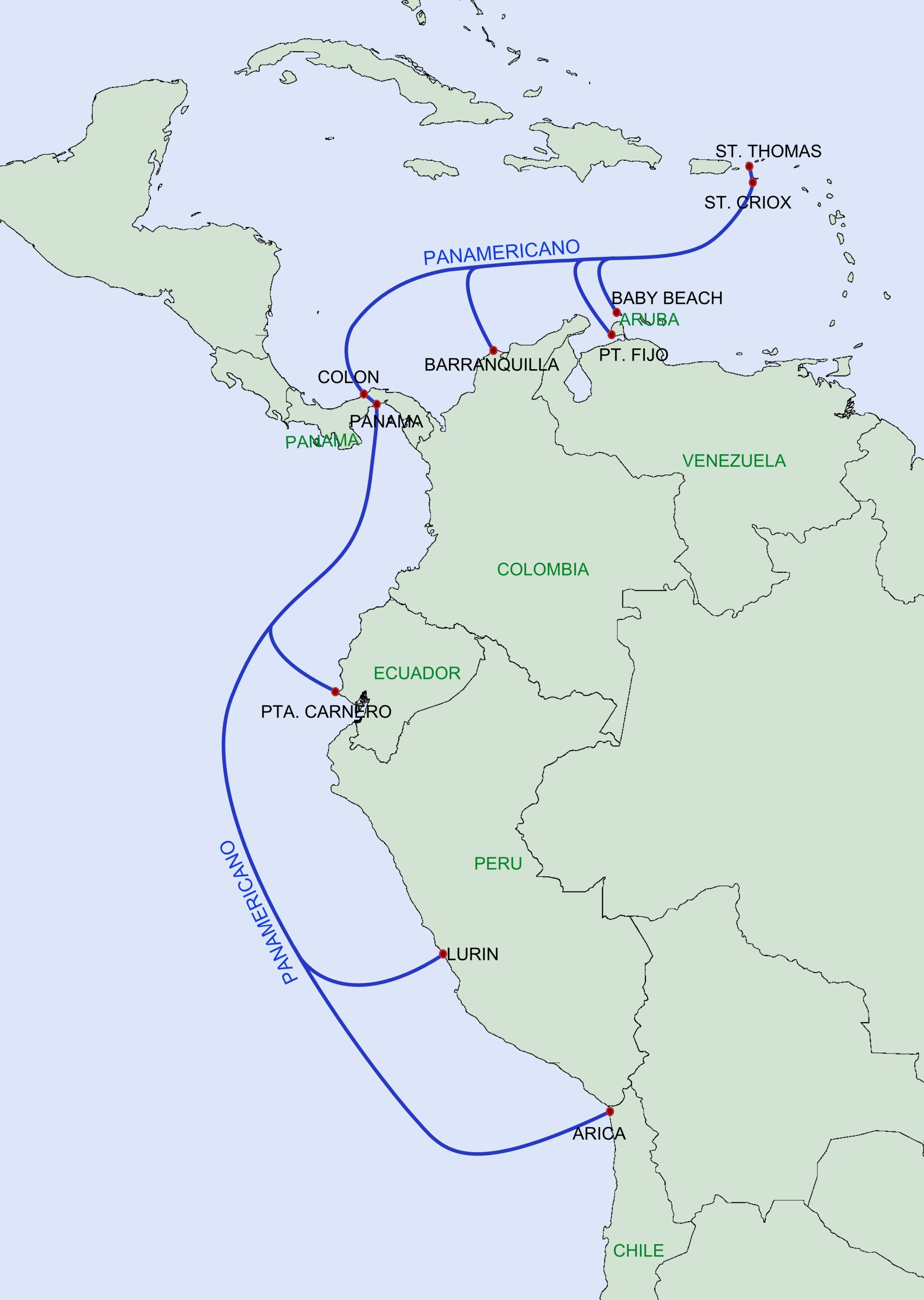
Sub marine cable PAN AM

PAN-AM (Pan-American) is a submarine telecommunications cable system connecting the west coast of South America and the Caribbean, crossing the continent through Panama. It has a bandwidth of 5 Gbit/s.

It has landing points in:

- Arica, Arica Province, Arica y Parinacota Region, Chile
- Lurin, Lima Region, Peru
- Punta Carnero, Guayas Province, Ecuador
- Battery Pratt, Colón Province, Panama
- Barranquilla, Atlántico Department, Colombia
- Punto Fijo, Falcón State, Venezuela
- Baby Beach, Aruba
- St. Croix, U.S. Virgin Islands

== See also ==
- List of international submarine communications cables
