= MAYA-1 =

Cable

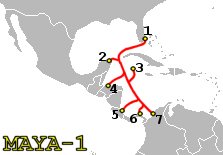

MAYA-1 is an optical submarine telephone cable.

It began service in 2000, using SDH and EDFA technologies and has a capacity of 82.5 Gbit/s. Owned and maintained by AT&T, Telmex, Hondutel, it is 4,323 km (2,686 mi) in length and was manufactured by ASN (Alcatel Submarine Networks).

It has landing points in:

1. Hollywood, Florida, United States
2. Cancún, Mexico
3. Half Moon Bay, Grand Cayman, Cayman Islands
4. Puerto Cortés, Honduras
5. Puerto Limón, Costa Rica
6. María Chiquita, Panama
7. Tolú, Colombia

== See also ==
- List of international submarine communications cables
