= TPC-5CN =

US-Japan underseas fiber optic link

TPC-5CN or Trans-Pacific Cable 5 Cable Network is a submarine telecommunications cable system linking Japan, Guam, Hawaii and mainland United States.

It has landing points in:

- Ninomiya, Kanagawa Prefecture, Japan
- Bandon, Coos County, Oregon, United States
- San Luis Obispo, San Luis Obispo County, California, United States
- Keawaula/Yokohama Beach, Wai'anae, Honolulu County, Oahu, Hawaii, United States
- Tumon Bay, Tumon, Tamuning, Guam
- Miyazaki, Miyazaki Prefecture, Japan

It has a transmission capacity of 5 Gbit/s, and a total cable length of 22,500 km (14,000 mi). It started operation on 31 December 1996.
