= Pipe Pacific Cable =

Pipe Pacific Cable (PPC-1)
- Cable type: Fibre-optic
- Fate: Active
- First traffic: August 2009
- Design capacity: 2.56 Tbit/s
- Built by: Tyco Telecom
- Landing points: Cromer, New South Wales, Australia; Madang, Papua New Guinea; Piti, Guam
- Area served: Asia-Pacific
- Owner(s): PIPE International (subsidiary of PIPE Networks)
- Website: PIPE International

PIPE Pacific Cable (PPC-1) is a 6,900 km submarine cable laid by PIPE Networks. It runs from Cromer, New South Wales, in Australia, to Piti, Guam.

It resulted in huge international backhaul cost savings to Australian customers, for access to the US internet backbone, quoting up to "50% savings" versus existing cable operators.

== Capacity ==
Quoting directly from PIPE International's PPC-1's Blog, substantial capacity will be available on the submarine cable network:

"PPC-1 will be configured primarily as a two optic-fibre pair system however it will include up to an additional 4 optic fibre pairs providing the potential to install spurs extending to a number of strategic locations within and outside of Australia. The main backbone will be laid in deep water with landings in Sydney, Australia and Piti, Guam. The main segment of the network will cover approximately 6,500 km. It will use the latest submarine wave division multiplexing to provide up to 96x10 Gbps wavelengths on each fibre pair, producing a total of 1.92 Terabits of capacity."

During the official launch, PIPE Network's CEO Bevan Slattery said the new cable would now deliver speeds at an even greater capacity than originally planned, 2.56 terabits per second in total.

In September 2012, an upgrade was announced that would take the capacity available on the cable past the original design capacity of 2.56 terabits per second, to around 3 terabits per second.

== Construction ==
Submarine cable laying commenced at the end of April 2009. The Guam to Papua New Guinea segment of the cable was completed in May 2009, with the ship Tyco Durable commencing on the 4 segments from Sydney to Papua New Guinea.

In June 2009, most cabling work south of Brisbane was completed, leaving two cable segments—from BU2 (Branching Unit) near Brisbane up to BU4 near Madang – to be laid before commissioning.

On 23 August 2009 the first light signal was transmitted over the completed cable from Sydney to Guam. This marked the completion of the submarine cabling work, and testing of the system began.

On 22 September 2009, Internode released a press release claiming successful transmission of IP packets across the cable, making it the first commercial entity to make use of the cable.

The project was formally completed on 8 October 2009.

== Cable landing points ==
The cable runs from Sydney to Guam. The cable landing points are:

- Cromer, New South Wales, Australia
- Madang, Papua New Guinea
- Piti, Guam

== Financial Realignment ==
On 19 December 2008, it was reported that a "realignment of payments" was organised between PIPE, its PPC-1 customers, and Tyco Telecom, the primary contractor on the project. Some saw this as PPC-1 striking financial difficulties, however the timing of payments were realigned to allow Tyco to continue the work with respect to meeting the construction deadline of July 2009. PIPE delivered a media release confirming this realignment, and the signing of a memorandum of understanding with Tyco Telecom, and a key customer, to secure the financial go-ahead for the project. It confirmed that:

"On 1 December 2008 PIPE Networks announced that given the unacceptable delays in the credit approval process, the Board of PPC-1 (Bermuda) Ltd had decided to withdraw from proposed arrangements with those financiers." Mr Roger Clarke, Chairman of PIPE Networks said "It is a testament to the commercial potential and importance of the project that an alternative agreement could be reached that sidestepped the debt markets for primary project financing. I congratulate the team who have been working tirelessly over the past three weeks to bring about this outstanding outcome."

== See also ==
- PIPE Networks
- List of international submarine communications cables
