= Australia–Japan Cable =

Submarina telecommunications system

Australia–Japan Cable (AJC)
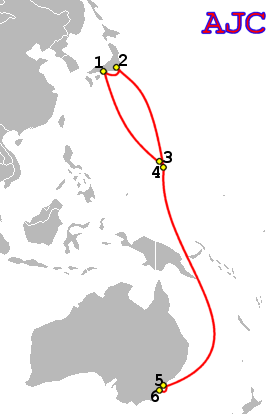
- Owners: Telstra, BT, Verizon Business, Softbank
- Landing points: 1. Shima, Japan; 2. Maruyama, Chiba, Japan; 3. Tanguisson, Guam; 4. Tumon Bay, Guam; 5. Oxford Falls, Sydney, Australia; 6. Paddington, Sydney, Australia
- Total length: 12,700 km
- Topology: collapsed loop design
- Design capacity: 640 gbit/s (2001); 1000 gbit/s (2008) >4000 gbit/s (2013)
- Currently lit capacity: 80 gbit/s (2001); 240 gbit/s (2008); 320 gbit/s (2013)
- Technology: Fibre-optic
- Date of first use: 2001

The Australia–Japan Cable, or AJC, is a 12,700 km submarine telecommunications cable system linking Australia and Japan via Guam that became operational in 2001. It had an original design capacity of 640 Gbit/s, but was initially equipped to use only 80 Gbit/s of this capacity. In April 2008 a capacity upgrade was completed, bringing equipped capacity to 240 Gbit/s. Design capacity was also increased to 1000 Gbit/s. Further upgrades will increase equipped capacity to meet increasing demand.

The AJC network employs a collapsed loop design that features diverse landings in Australia, Guam and Japan and diverse routing at water depths less than 4000m. This design reduces cost by using a common sheath in deep water, where risk of failure is low, but provides redundancy to mitigate risk in shallower waters and in the landing stations.

The network supports a range of access interfaces, including SDH at STM1, STM4, STM16 and STM64 levels, 2.5G clear, Direct Wavelength Access, Gigabit Ethernet and 10 Gigabit Ethernet. A range of protection options are available, including SDH span and ring protection and 1:n wavelength redundancy.

The cable has a design life to 2026.

== Landing points ==
1. Shima, Japan
2. Maruyama, Chiba, Japan
3. Tanguisson, Guam, unincorporated territory of the United States
4. Tumon Bay, Guam, unincorporated territory of the United States
5. Oxford Falls, Sydney, Australia
6. Paddington, Sydney, Australia

== Ownership ==
AJC is jointly owned by Telstra, BT, Verizon Business and Softbank.

== See also ==
- List of international submarine communications cables
