= Critical Foreign Dependencies Initiative =

The Critical Foreign Dependencies Initiative (CFDI) is a strategy and list, maintained by the United States Department of Homeland Security, of foreign infrastructure which "if attacked or destroyed would critically impact the U.S." A copy of the 2008 list was redacted (removing details of names and locations) and leaked by WikiLeaks on 5 December 2010 as part of the website's leak of US diplomatic cables; no details on the exact location of the assets was included in the list. In September 2011, WikiLeaks published the unredacted copy of the list. The list's release was met with strong criticism from the US and British governments, while media and other countries have reacted less strongly saying that the entries are not secret and easily identified.

== Overview ==
According to the Department of Homeland Security (DHS), it "Developed and executed the Critical Foreign Dependencies Initiative (CFDI) which extends our protection strategy overseas to include important foreign infrastructure that if attacked or destroyed would critically impact the U.S. The prioritized National Critical Foreign Dependencies List (NCFDL) currently contains over 300 assets and systems in over 50 countries." According to the 2009 National Infrastructure Protection Plan, the CFDI was launched by the federal government "working in close coordination and cooperation with the private sector" in 2007 "to identify assets and systems located outside the United States, which, if disrupted or destroyed, would critically affect public health and safety, the economy, or national security. The resulting strategic compendium guides engagement with foreign countries in the CIKR [critical infrastructure and key resources] protection mission area". Using an initial inventory of infrastructure located outside the United States created by the federal government, DHS and the Department of State (DOS) developed the CFDI, "a process designed to ensure that the resulting classified list of critical foreign dependencies is representative and leveraged in a coordinated and inclusive manner."

Development of the CFDI was planned in three phases, on an annual and ongoing basis. The first phase was identification, beginning with "the first-ever National Critical Foreign Dependencies List in FY2008". This was done by the DHS working with "other Federal partners", in a process that "includes input from public and private sector CIKR community partners." Next comes prioritization, in which "DHS, in collaboration with other CIKR community partners and, in particular, DOS, prioritized the National Critical Foreign Dependencies List based on factors such as the overall criticality of the CIKR to the United States and the willingness and capability of foreign partners to engage in collaborative risk management activities." The third "involves leveraging the prioritized list to guide current and future U.S. bilateral and multilateral incident and risk management activities with foreign partners. DHS and DOS established mechanisms to ensure coordinated engagement and collaboration by public entities, in partnership with the private sector."

== Disclosure ==
The "2008 Critical Foreign Dependencies Initiative (CFDI) list" was contained in a February 2009 diplomatic cable to the U.S. Secretary of State, Hillary Clinton, which was leaked, redacted and released in the United States diplomatic cables leak by WikiLeaks in 2010. The BBC described it as "one of the most sensitive" leaks as of 6 December 2010. In its redaction process, WikiLeaks removed only a minority of the details of names and locations, and left the rest uncensored; details of the exact location of the assets were not included in the list. In September 2011, WikiLeaks published the unredacted copy of the list. The list did not include any military facilities, but rather facilities important for the global supply chain, global communications, and economically important goods and services.

In the cable the State Department asked American diplomats to identify installations overseas "whose loss could critically impact the public health, economic security, and/or national and homeland security of the United States." The order was under the direction of the Department for Homeland Security in co-ordination with the Department of State.

In summary the list consists of Submarine communications cables, major port hubs, critical sea lanes, oil pipelines, mines, dams, and pharmaceutical facilities. A major emphasis on European pharmaceutical facilities was said by the BBC to suggest a fear of biological warfare or global pandemic.

=== Responses to disclosure ===
The cable had been classified secret and not for review by non-U.S. personnel,. The publication of the cable was followed by strong criticism from the US government and the British government, but a tepid response from news outlets and other foreign nations.

WikiLeaks spokesman Kristinn Hrafnsson said with reference to the cable: "This further undermines claims made by the US Government that its embassy officials do not play an intelligence-gathering role. Part of the cable read: "Posts are not/not being asked to consult with host governments with respect to this request." Hrafnsson later explained to The Times that the list itself "had been made available to 2.5 million people including military personnel and private contractors by the U.S. government". He went on to say: "in terms of security issues, while this cable details the strategic importance of assets across the world, it does not give any information as to their exact locations, security measures, vulnerabilities or any similar factors, though it does reveal the U.S. asked its diplomats to report back on these matters."

==== United States ====
US State Department spokesman P.J. Crowley denounced the disclosure saying it "gives a group like al-Qaeda a targeting list." Anthony Cordesman, a 'national security analyst for the Center for Strategic and International Studies', said: "this has given a global map – a menu, if not a recipe book – to every extremist group in the world. To me it would be amazing to see how WikiLeaks could rationalize this." However, Alistair Millar, 'director of the Center on Global Counterterrorism Cooperation', said: "it's a little different...than with diplomatic cable leaks...in this case, this is largely information available to everyone if they really wanted to look."

Janet Napolitano, the Secretary of Homeland Security, said the list "could jeopardize our national security".

==== Nations other than the United States ====
A spokesman for British prime minister David Cameron said: "The leaks and their publication are damaging to national security in the United States, Britain and elsewhere. It is vital that governments are able to operate on the basis of confidentiality of information."

Vic Toews, the Public Safety Minister of Canada, seemed "unconcerned or unaware" of the release of the list. He said: "I don't follow gossip very much so I don't really know the impact of WikiLeaks, but I can assure you that the security agencies in Canada are following it very closely and to the extent that I need to be involved and address those issues, they will brief me on the issues."

Lin Yu-fang, a politician in Taiwan, stated, in regards to the revealing of the six undersea telecommunications cables in China, there are "actually no secrets concerning the cables", but he said there "could be certain thorny political or military issues involving Taiwan, the U.S. or Japan if more sensitive secrets were exposed".

==== News outlets ====
A CBS article elaborating on the release stated that "although much of the information contained [in the list] was already in the public domain, officials in Washington and London have been quick to condemn WikiLeaks for publishing it, calling the act evidence of the organization's willingness to potentially aid terror groups in its mission to reveal U.S. secrets." The New York Times stated that the list "appears largely limited to sites that any would-be terrorist with Internet access and a bit of ingenuity might quickly have identified."

The Lancashire Evening Post pointed out in an article that the list "contains information on defence sites in Lancashire which is more than five years out of date." The article specifically pointed out that the "Royal Ordnance (RO) site at Chorley...has been developed as Buckshaw Village for the past five years" and the "BAE facility in Plymouth, Devon...[was] sold as part of a deal three years ago."

==== Companies ====
Mayne Pharma told the Herald-Sun that "its entry on a classified diplomatic cable is out-of-date and full of errors", since the drug listed on the cable as its resource, a snake anti-venom, hasn't been made by the company for "more than ten years".

Roger Aston, the chief executive of Mayne Pharma, said: "I can only go on what I can see now in the media (about WikiLeaks) but judging from what I've seen about what they've said about Mayne Pharma and Faulding, a lot of it (the information) is old, out of date stuff that's not relevant."

Dean Veverka of Southern Cross concurred, saying, "(Roger Aston's comments) that the information in the WikiLeaks document was ten years out of date could be accurate. To only list Southern Cross as the only internet cable network here might have been relevant 10 years ago (when only coaxial cables were available), but Australia now has seven cables going out of country. Australia has a very resilient network nowadays."

Bill Gorman, sales director of David Brown Ltd., said: "We make gearboxes for our platinum and gold mines. We have supplied equipment via the US for other countries, but have only once exported directly to the States, for a copper mine seven years ago. I have no idea why we're on the list."

A BAE Systems spokeswoman said: "The information in the list was incorrect. The site in Plymouth was sold in 2007, and in Chorley, there are no longer any weapons manufacturing, although there is still an office there. The information about Preston was correct. The safety and security of our people and facilities is of highest priority."

== List of critical foreign dependencies ==
The 2008 CFDI list, as redacted by WikiLeaks, listed the following infrastructures:

=== Sea ports ===
A number of sea ports were listed, including several Chinese ports (Shanghai Port, Guangzhou Port, Hong Kong Port, Ningbo Port, Tianjin Port) as well as one Taiwanese port (Kaohsiung Port) and several European ports (Port of Antwerp, Port of Hamburg, Rotterdam Port).

=== Cable routes ===
==== Northern hemisphere ====
- Bermuda - GlobeNet, formerly Bermuda US-1 (BUS-1) undersea cable landing Devonshire, Bermuda
- Canada - Hibernia Atlantic undersea cable landing at Herring Cove, Nova Scotia, Canada
- China - C2C Cable Network undersea cable landings at Chom Hom Kok, Tseung Kwan O, and Shanghai; China-US undersea cable landings at Chongming and Shantou; and FLAG/REACH North Asia Loop undersea cable landing as Tong Fuk
- Denmark - TAT-14 undersea cable landing, Blaabjerg, Denmark
- Fiji - Southern Cross undersea cable landing, Suva, Fiji
- France - APOLLO undersea cable, Lannion, France; FA-1 undersea cable, Plerin, France; and TAT-14 undersea cable landing St. Valery, France
- French Guiana - Americas-II undersea cable landing Cayenne, French Guiana
- Germany - TAT-14 undersea cable landing, Norden, Germany; Atlantic Crossing-1 (AC-1) undersea cable landing Sylt
- Ireland - Hibernia Atlantic undersea cable landing, Dublin Ireland
- Japan - C2C Cable Network undersea cable landings in Chikura, Ajigaura, and Shima; China-US undersea cable in Okinawa; FLAG/REACH North Asia Loop undersea cable landing in Wada; Japan-US undersea cable landings at Maruyama and Kitaibaraki; KJCN undersea cable landings at Fukuoka and Kita-Kyushu; Pacific Crossing-1 (PC-1) undersea cable landing in Ajigaura and Shima; and Tyco Transpacific undersea cable landings in Toyohashi and Emi.
- Martinique - Americas-II undersea cable landing Le Lamentin, Martinique
- Mexico - FLAG/REACH North Asia Loop undersea cable landing, Tijuana and Pan-American Crossing (PAC) undersea cable landing, Mazatlan
- Netherlands - Atlantic Crossing-1 (AC-1) undersea cable landing, Beverwijk; TAT-14 undersea cable landing, Katwijk
- Panama - FLAG/REACH North Asia Loop undersea cable landing Fort Amador, Panama
- Philippines - C2C Cable Network undersea cable landing, Batangas, Philippines; and EAC undersea cable landing Cavite, Philippines
- Republic of Korea - C2C Cable Network undersea cable landing, Pusan, Republic of Korea; EAC undersea cable landing Shindu-Ri, Republic of Korea; FLAG/REACH North Asia Loop undersea cable landing Pusan, Republic of Korea; and KJCN undersea cable landing Pusan, Republic of Korea
- Singapore - C2C Cable Network undersea cable landing, Changi, Singapore; EAC undersea cable landing Changi North, Singapore; C2C Cable Network undersea cable landing, Changi, Singapore; and EAC undersea cable landing Changi North, Singapore
- Taiwan- C2C Cable Network undersea cable landing, Fangshan, Taiwan; C2C Cable Network undersea cable landing, Tanshui, Taiwan; China-US undersea cable landing Fangshan, Taiwan; EAC undersea cable landing Pa Li, Taiwan; FLAG/REACH North Asia Loop undersea cable landing Toucheng, Taiwan
- Trinidad and Tobago - Americas-II undersea cable landing Port of Spain
- United Kingdom - APOLLO undersea cable landing Bude, Cornwall Station, United Kingdom; Atlantic Crossing-1 (AC-1) undersea cable landing Whitesands Bay; FA-1 undersea cable landing Skewjack, Cornwall Station; Hibernia Atlantic undersea cable landing, Southport, United Kingdom; TAT-14 undersea cable landing Bude, Cornwall Station, United Kingdom; Tyco Transatlantic undersea cable landing, Highbridge, United Kingdom; Tyco Transatlantic undersea cable landing, Pottington, United Kingdom; and Yellow/Atlantic Crossing-2 (AC-2) undersea cable landing Bude, United Kingdom
- Venezuela - Four cable landing sites in Venezuela. GlobeNet undersea cable landings at Punta Gorda, Catia La Mar, and Manonga

==== Southern hemisphere ====
- Australia - Southern Cross undersea cable landings at Brookvale and Sydney, Australia
- Brazil - Americas-II undersea cable landing at Fortaleza; GlobeNet undersea cable landing at Fortaleza; and GlobeNet undersea cable landing Rio de Janeiro
- Netherlands Antilles - Americas-II undersea cable landing, Willemstad
- New Zealand - Southern Cross undersea cable landing, Whenuapai, New Zealand; and Southern Cross undersea cable landing, Takapuna, New Zealand

=== Mineral resources ===
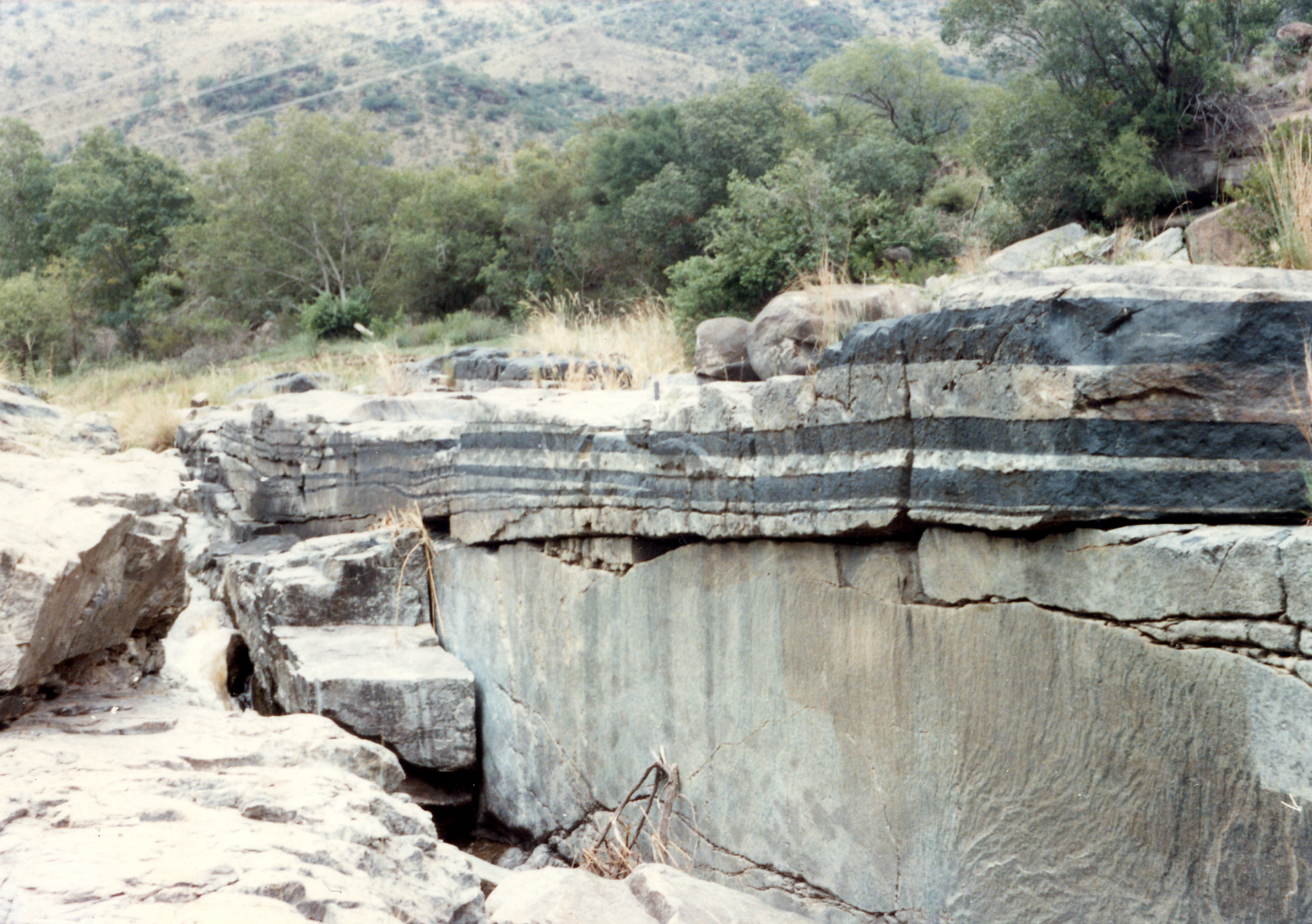
Chromitite (black) and anorthosite (light grey) layered igneous rocks in Critical Zone UG1 of the Bushveld Igneous Complex at the Mononono River outcrop, near Steelpoort

- Australia - Manganese - Battery grade, natural; battery grade, synthetic; chemical grade; ferro; metallurgical grade; Nickel Mines
- China - Fluorite (Mine); Germanium Mine; Graphite Mine; Rare-earth minerals/elements; Tin Mine and Plant; and Tungsten - Mine and Plant
- Democratic Republic of Congo - Cobalt (Mine and Plant)
- Gabon - Manganese - Battery grade, natural; battery grade, synthetic; chemical grade; ferro; metallurgical grade
- Guinea - Bauxite (Mine)
- South Africa - Chromite mines around Rustenburg; Ferrochromium; Manganese - Battery grade, natural; battery grade, synthetic; chemical grade; ferro; metallurgical grade; Palladium Mine and Plant; Platinum Mines; and Rhodium
- Indonesia - Tin Mine and Plant
- Japan - Iodine Mine
- Belgium - Germanium Mine
- Norway - Cobalt Nickel Mine
- Russia - Uranium Nickel Mine: Used in certain types of stainless steel and superalloys; Palladium Mine and Plant; and Rhodium
- Ukraine - Manganese - Battery grade, natural; battery grade, synthetic; chemical grade; ferro; metallurgical grade
- Kazakhstan - Ferrochromium Khromtau Complex, Kempersai, (Chromite Mine)
- India -Orissa (chromite mines) and Karnataka (chromite mines)
- Brazil - Iron Ore from Rio Tinto Mine; Manganese - Battery grade, natural; battery grade, synthetic; chemical grade; ferro; metallurgical grade; Niobium (Columbium), Araxa, Minas Gerais State (mine); and Ouvidor and Catalao I, Goias State: Niobium
- Chile - Iodine Mine
- Canada - Germanium Mine; Graphite Mine; Iron Ore Mine; Nickel Mine; Niobec Mine, Quebec, Canada: Niobium
- Mexico - Graphite Mine
- Peru - Tin Mine and Plant

=== Africa ===
==== Morocco ====
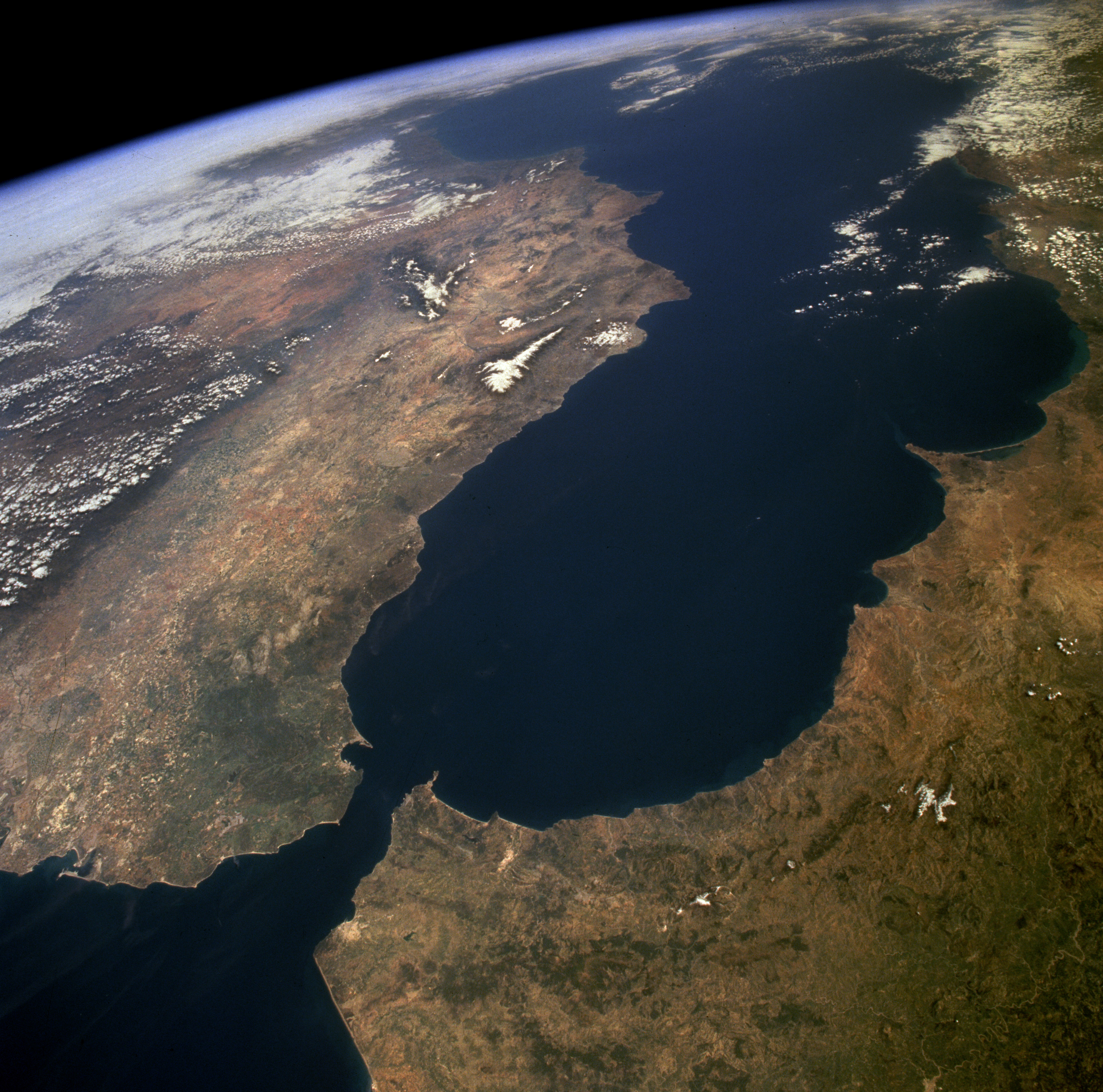
The Strait of Gibraltar narrowly separates Spain in Southern Europe and Morocco in Northern Africa, connecting the Atlantic Ocean and the Mediterranean Sea.

- Strait of Gibraltar
- Maghreb-Europe (GME) gas pipeline, Morocco

==== South Africa ====
- BAE Land System OMC, Benoni, South Africa
- Brown David Gear Industries LTD, Benoni, South Africa

==== Tunisia ====
- Trans-Med Gas Pipeline

=== East Asia and the Pacific ===
==== Australia ====
- Maybe Faulding Mulgrave (F H Faulding) Victoria, Australia: Manufacturing facility for Midazolam injection.
- Mayne Pharma (fill/finish), Melbourne, Australia: Sole suppliers of Crotalid Polyvalent Antivenin (CroFab)

==== China ====
- Hydroelectric Dam Turbines and Generators
- Polypropylene Filter Material for N-95 Masks

==== Indonesia ====
- Straits of Malacca

==== Japan ====
- Hitachi, Hydroelectric Dam Turbines and Generators
- Ports at Chiba, Kobe, Nagoya, and Yokohama
- Metal Fabrication Machines Titanium
- Metal (Processed) Biken, Kanonji City, Japan
- Hitachi Electrical Power Generators and Components Large AC Generators above 40 MVA

==== Republic of Korea ====
- Hitachi Large Electric Power Transformers 230 - 500 kV Busan Port

==== Malaysia ====
- Straits of Malacca

==== Singapore ====
- Straits of Malacca

=== Europe and Eurasia ===
==== Austria ====
- Baxter AG, Vienna, Austria: Immune Globulin Intravenous (IGIV)
- Octapharma Pharmazeutika, Vienna, Austria: Immune Globulin Intravenous (IGIV)

==== Azerbaijan ====
Four oil pipelines from Baku

- Sangachal Terminal
- Baku-Tbilisi-Ceyhan Pipeline

==== Belarus ====
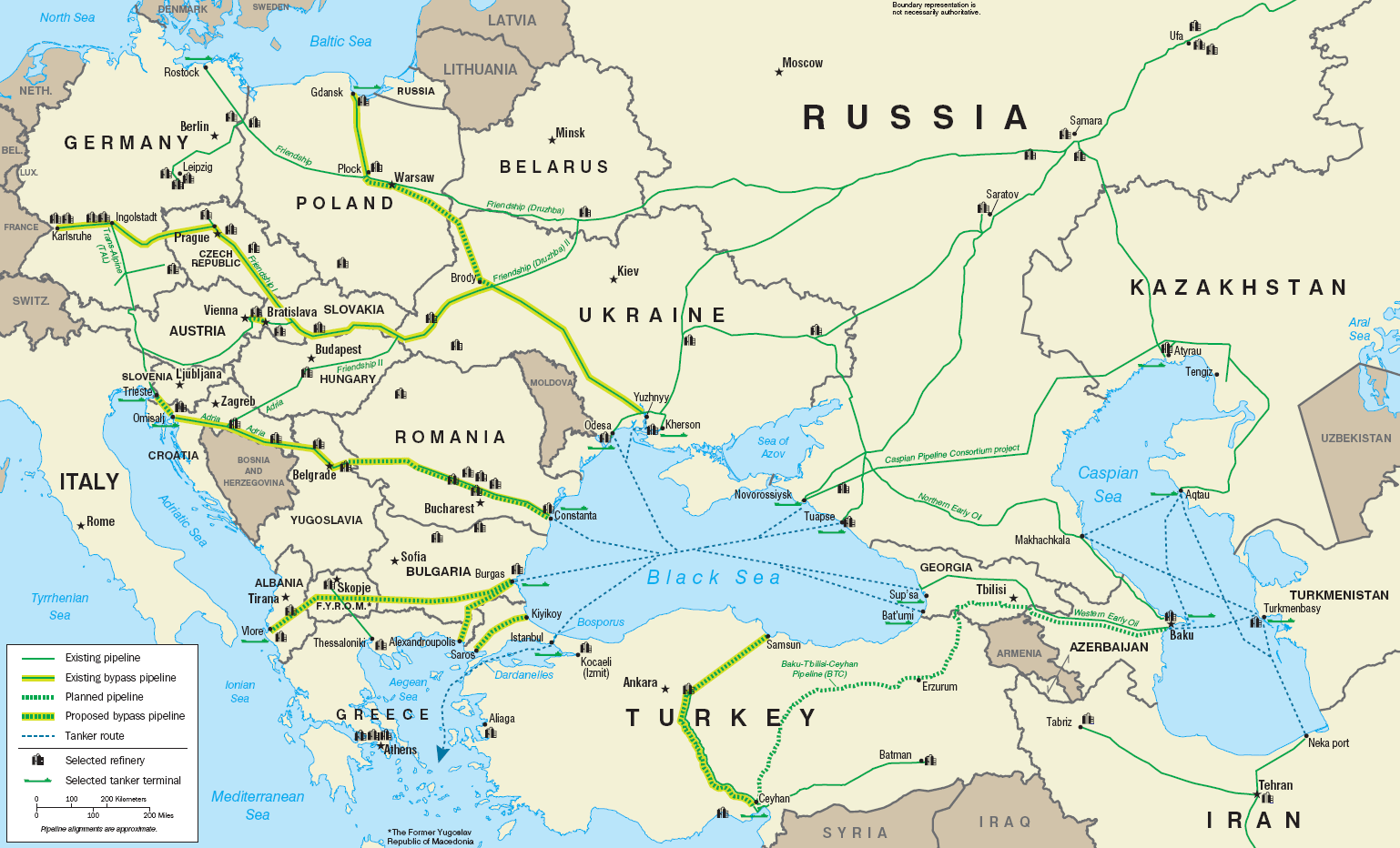
The Druzhba pipeline and other oil pipelines in Europe

- Druzhba Oil Pipeline

==== Belgium ====
- Baxter SA, Lessines, Belgium: Immune Globulin Intravenous (IGIV)
- Glaxo Smith Kline, Rixensart, Belgium: Acellular Pertussis Vaccine Component
- GlaxoSmithKline Biologicals SA, Wavre, Belgium: Acellular Pertussis Vaccine Component

==== Denmark ====
- Bavarian Nordic (BN), Hejreskovvej, Kvistgard, Denmark: Smallpox Vaccine
- Novo Nordisk Pharmaceuticals, Inc. Bagsvaerd, Denmark: Numerous formulations of insulin
- Novo Nordisk Insulin Manufacturer: Global insulin supplies
- Statens Serum Institut, Copenhagen, Denmark: DTaP (including D and T components) pediatric version

==== France ====
- Sanofi-Aventis Insulin Manufacturer: Global insulin supplies Foot-and-mouth disease Vaccine finishing
- Alstom, Hydroelectric Dam Turbines and Generators
- Alstrom Electrical Power Generators and Components
- EMD Pharms Semoy, France: Cyanokit Injection
- GlaxoSmithKline, Inc. Évreux, France: Influenza Neuraminidase inhibitor RELENZA (Zanamivir)
- Diagast, Cedex, France: Olympus (assists with detecting blood group)
- Genzyme Polyclonals SAS (bulk), Lyon, France: Thymoglobulin
- Sanofi Pasteur SA, Lyon, France: Rabies virus vaccine

==== Georgia ====
- Baku-Tbilisi-Ceyhan Pipeline

==== Germany ====
- BASF Ludwigshafen: World's largest integrated chemical complex
- Siemens Erlangen: Essentially irreplaceable production of key chemicals
- Siemens, GE, Hydroelectric Dam Turbines and Generators
- Draeger Safety AG & Co., Lübeck, Germany: Critical to gas detection capability
- Junghans Microtec Dunningen-Seedorf, Germany: Critical to the production of mortars
- TDW-Gesellschaft Wirksysteme, Schroebenhausen, Germany: Critical to the production of the Patriot Advanced Capability Lethality Enhancement Assembly
- Siemens, Large Electric Power Transformers 230 - 500 kV
- Siemens, GE Electrical Power Generators and Components
- Druzhba Oil Pipeline
- Sanofi Aventis Frankfurt am Main, Germany: Lantus Injection (insulin)
- Heyl Chemish-pharmazeutische Fabrik GmbH: Radiogardase (Prussian blue)
- Hameln Pharmaceuticals, Hameln, Germany: Pentetate Calcium Trisodium (Ca DTPA) and Pentetate Zinc Trisodium (Zn DTPA) for contamination with plutonium, americium, and curium
- IDT Biologika GmbH, Dessau Rossiau, Germany: BN Small Pox Vaccine
- Biotest AG, Dreiech, Germany: Supplier for TANGO (impacts automated blood typing ability)
- CSL Behring GmbH, Marburg, Germany: Antihemophilic factor/von Willebrand factor
- Novartis Vaccines and Diagnostics GmbH, Marburg, Germany: Rabies virus vaccine
- Vetter Pharma Fertigung GmbH & Co KG, Ravensburg, Germany (filling): Rho(D) IGIV

==== Ireland ====
- Genzyme Ireland Ltd. (filling), Waterford, Ireland: Thymoglobulin

==== Italy ====
- Glaxo Smith Kline SpA (fill/finish), Parma, Italy: Digibind (used to treat snake bites)
- Trans-Med gas pipeline

==== Poland ====
- Druzhba Oil Pipeline

==== Russia ====
- Novorossiysk Export Terminal
- Primorsk Export Terminal
- Nadym Gas Pipeline Junction: The most critical gas facility in the world

==== Spain ====
Several gas pipelines cross the Mediterranean into Spain and Italy.

- Strait of Gibraltar
- Instituto Grifols, SA, Barcelona, Spain: Immune Globulin Intravenous (IGIV)
- Maghreb-Europe (GME) gas pipeline, Algeria

==== Sweden ====
- Recip AB Sweden: Thyrosafe (potassium iodine)

==== Switzerland ====
- Hoffman-LaRoche, Inc. Basel, Switzerland: Tamiflu (oseltamivir)
- Berna Biotech, Berne, Switzerland: Typhoid vaccine
- CSL Behring AG, Berne, Switzerland: Immune Globulin Intravenous (IGIV)

==== Turkey ====
- Metal Fabrication Machines: Small number of Turkish companies (Durma, Baykal, Ermaksan)
- Bosporus Strait
- Baku-Tbilisi-Ceyhan Pipeline

==== United Kingdom ====
- Goonhilly Teleport, Goonhilly Downs, United Kingdom
- Madley Teleport, Stone Street, Madley, United Kingdom
- Martelsham Teleport, Ipswich, United Kingdom
- Foot and Mouth Disease Vaccine finishing
- BAE Systems (Operations) Ltd., Presont [Preston], Lancashire, United Kingdom: Critical to the F-35 Joint Strike Fighter
- BAE Systems Operations Ltd., Southway, Plymouth Devon, United Kingdom: Critical to Extended Range Guided Munitions
- BAE Systems RO Defence, Chorley, United Kingdom: Critical to the Joint Standoff Weapon (JSOW) AGM-154C (Unitary Variant)
- MacTaggart Scott, Loanhead, Edinburgh, Lothian, Scotland, United Kingdom: Critical to the Ship Submersible Nuclear (SSN)

=== Near/Middle East ===
==== Djibouti ====
- Bab al-Mendeb: Shipping lane is a critical supply chain node

==== Egypt ====
- 'Ayn Sukhnah-SuMEd Receiving Import Terminal
- 'Sidi Kurayr-SuMed Offloading Export Terminal Suez Canal

==== Iran ====
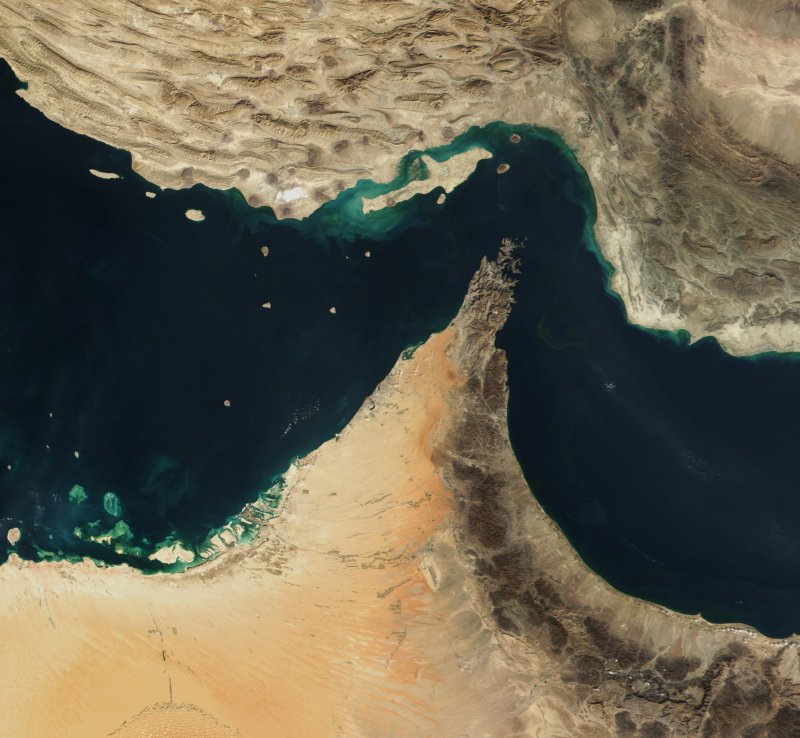
About 20% of the world's crude oil shipments pass through the Strait of Hormuz between Iran and the United Arab Emirates.

- Strait of Hormuz
- Khark (Kharg) Island
- Sea Island Export Terminal
- Khark Island T-Jetty

==== Iraq ====
- Al Basrah Oil Terminal

==== Israel ====
- Rafael Ordnance Systems Division, Haifa, Israel: Critical to Sensor Fused Weapons (SFW), Wind Corrected Munitions Dispensers (WCMD), Tail Kits, and batteries

==== Kuwait ====
- Mina' al Ahmadi Export Terminal

==== Oman ====
- Strait of Hormuz

==== Qatar ====
- Ras Laffan Industrial Center: By 2012 Qatar will be the largest source of imported LNG to U.S.

==== Saudi Arabia ====
- Abqaiq Processing Center: Largest crude oil processing and stabilization plant in the world
- Al Ju'aymah Export Terminal: Part of the Ras Tanura complex
- As Saffaniyah Processing Center
- Qatif Pipeline Junction
- Ras at Tanaqib Processing Center
- Ras Tanura Export Terminal
- Shaybah Central Gas-oil Separation Plant

==== United Arab Emirates (UAE) ====
- Das Island Export Terminal
- Jabal Zannah Export Terminal
- Strait of Hormuz

==== Yemen ====
- Bab al-Mendeb: Shipping lane is a critical supply chain node

=== South and Central Asia ===
==== India ====
- Generamedix Gujurat, India: Chemotherapy agents, including fluorouracil and methotrexate

=== Western Hemisphere ===
==== Argentina ====
- Foot and Mouth Disease Vaccine finishing

==== Canada ====
- James Bay Power Project, Quebec: monumental hydroelectric power development
- Mica Dam, British Columbia: Failure would impact the Columbia River Basin
- Hydro Quebec, Quebec: Critical irreplaceable source of power to portions of Northeast U. S.
- Robert Moses-Robert H. Saunders Power Dam: Part of the St. Lawrence Power Project, between Barnhart Island, New York, and Cornwall, Ontario
- Seven Mile Dam, British Columbia: Concrete gravity dam between two other hydroelectric power dams along the Pend d'Oreille River
- Pickering Nuclear Power Plant, Ontario
- Chalk River Nuclear Facility, Ontario: Largest supplier of medical radioisotopes in the world
- Hydrofluoric Acid Production Facility, Allied Signal, Amherstburg, Ontario
- Enbridge Pipeline Alliance Pipeline: Natural gas transmission from Canada Maritime and Northeast Pipeline: Natural gas transmission from Canada
- TransCanada Gas: Natural gas transmission from Canada
- Alexandria Bay Point of Entry (POE), Ontario: Northern border crossing
- Ambassador Bridge Point of Entry, Ontario: Northern border crossing
- Blaine POE, British Columbia: Northern border crossing
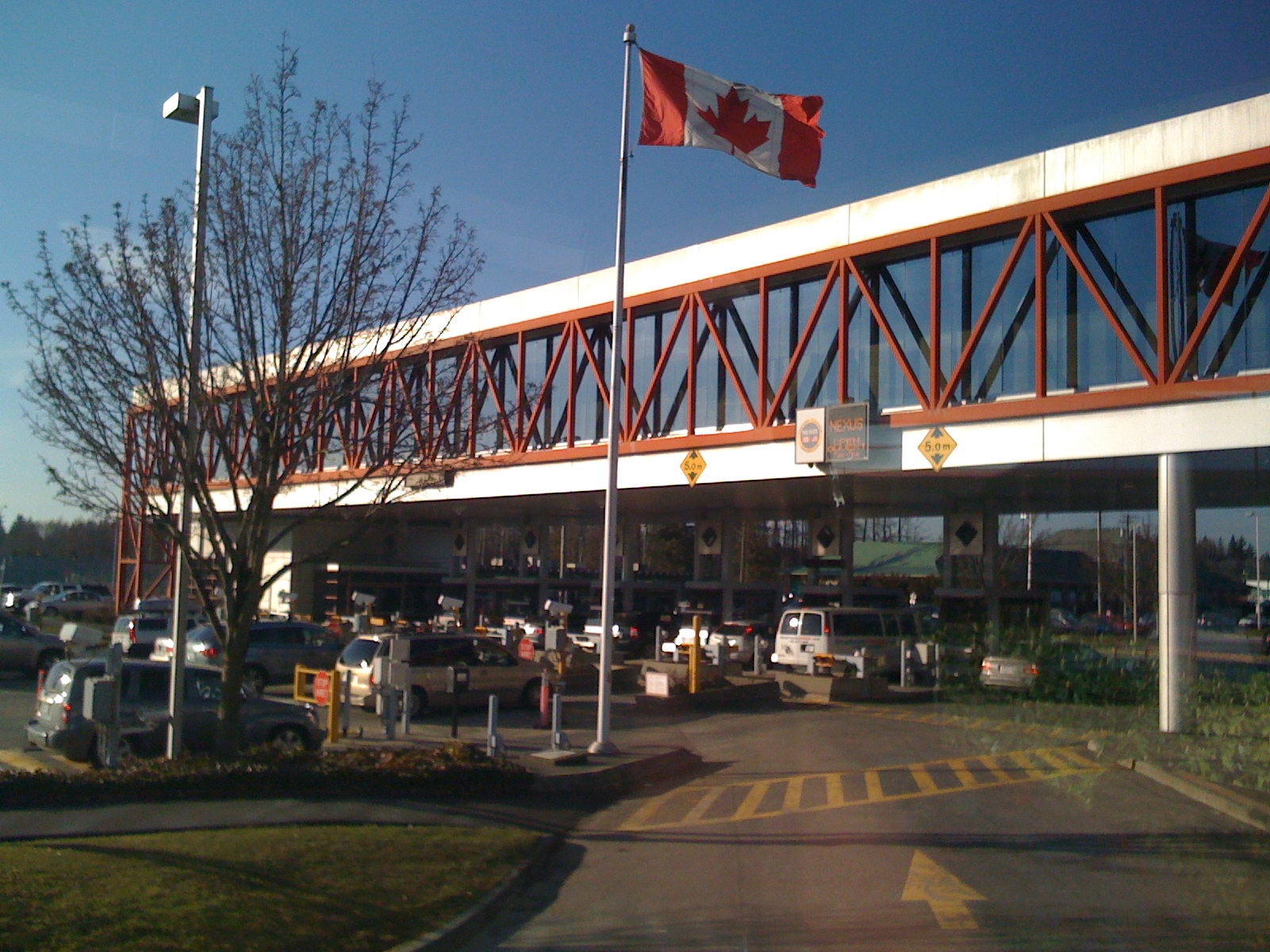
  Pacific Highway Border Crossing - Blaine WA/Douglas BC
- Blaine Washington Rail Crossing, British Columbia
- Blue Water Bridge POE, Sarnia, Ontario: Northern border crossing
- Champlain Bridge POE, Quebec: Northern border crossing
- CPR Tunnel Rail Crossing, Ontario (Michigan Central Rail Crossing)
- International Bridge Rail Crossing, Ontario International Railway Bridge Rail Crossing
- Lewiston-Queenston POE, Ontario: Northern border crossing
- Peace Bridge POE, Ontario: Northern border crossing
- Pembina, North Dakota POE, North Dakota/Manitoba border crossing.
- North Portal Rail Crossing, Saskatchewan
- St. Clair Tunnel Rail Crossing between Sarnia, Ontario and Port Huron, Michigan
- Waneta Dam, British Columbia: Earthfill/concrete hydropower dam
- Darlington Nuclear Power Plant, Ontario, Canada
- E-ONE Moli Energy, Maple Ridge, British Columbia, Canada: Critical to production of various military application electronics
- General Dynamics Land Systems - Canada, London Ontario, Canada: Critical to the production of the Stryker/USMC LAV Vehicle Integration
- Raytheon Systems Canada Ltd. ELCAN Optical Technologies Division, Midland, Ontario: Critical to the production of the AGM-130 Missile
- Thales Optronique Canada, Inc., Montreal, Quebec: Critical optical systems for ground combat vehicles
- Cangene, Winnipeg, Manitoba: Plasma
- Sanofi Pasteur Ltd., Toronto, Canada: makers of polio virus vaccine
- GlaxoSmithKline Biologicals, North America, Quebec: Pre-pandemic influenza vaccines

==== Mexico ====
- Amistad International Dam: On the Rio Grande near Del Rio, Texas and Ciudad Acuna, Coahuila, Mexico
- Anzalduas Dam: Diversion dam south of Mission, Texas, operated jointly by the U.S. and Mexico for flood control
- Falcon International Dam: Upstream of Roma, Texas and Miguel Aleman, Tamaulipas, Mexico
- Retamal Dam: Diversion dam south of Weslaco, Texas, operated jointly by the U.S. and Mexico for flood control
- GE Hydroelectric Dam Turbines and Generators: Main source for a large portion of larger components
- Bridge of the Americas (El Paso – Ciudad Juárez): Southern border crossing
- Brownsville POE: Southern border crossing
- Calexico East POE: Southern border crossing
- Colombia-Solidarity Bridge: Southern border crossing
- Kansas City Southern de Mexico (KCSM) Rail Line, (Mexico)
- Nogales POE: Southern border crossing
- Laredo Rail Crossing
- Eagle Pass Rail Crossing
- Southern border crossings, Otay Mesa Crossing, World Trade Bridge, and Ysleta Zaragosa Bridge
- Pharr International Bridge: Southern border crossing
- Hydrofluoric Acid Production Facility
- GE Electrical Power Generators and Components
- General Electric, Large Electric Power Transformers 230 - 500 kV

==== Panama ====
- Panama Canal

==== Trinidad and Tobago ====
- Atlantic LNG: Provides 70% of U.S. natural gas import needs
