= Saarlouis Body & Assembly =

German car plant located in Saarlouis of Ford

Coordinates: 49°20′50″N 6°45′53″E

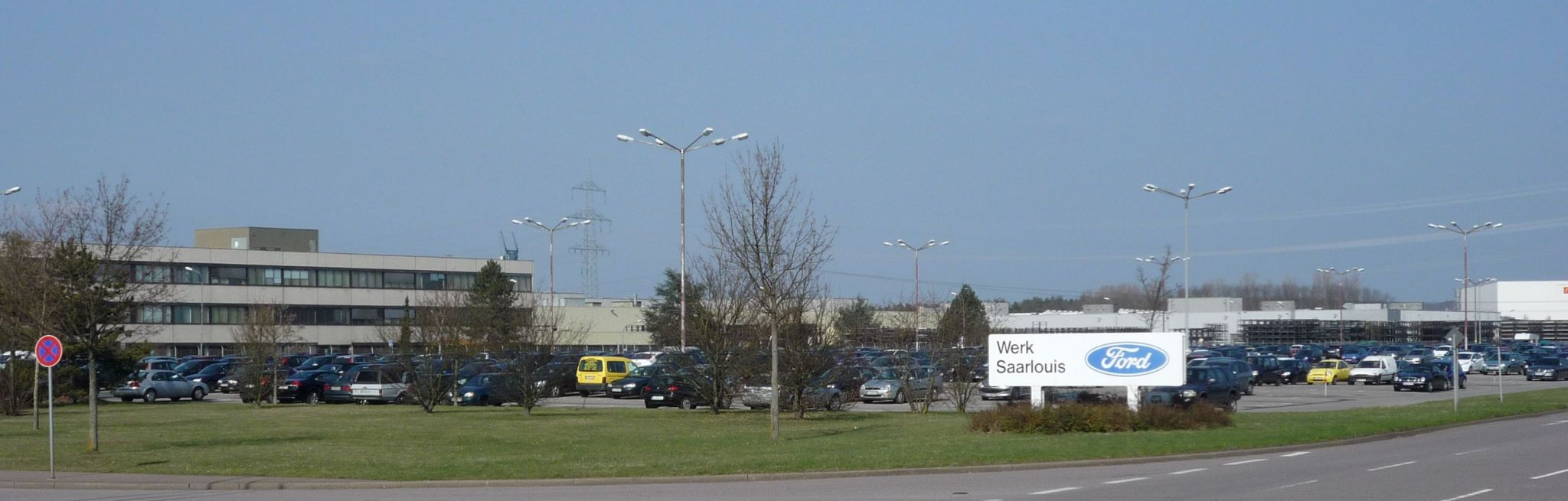
Ford Saarlouis body and assembly plant

Ford Saarlouis Body & Assembly (SB&A) was a major car plant located on the north-eastern edge of Saarlouis in the German Saarland. It belongs to Ford-Werke GmbH, the German subsidiary of the American automaker Ford Motor Company. The plant was closed in November 2025.

== History ==
The construction of the plant started in 1966 on a former airfield. On 16 September 1966, the foundation stone was laid. In 1968, the production of car body panels for Renault started.

The plant commenced car production on 16 January 1970, and was formally opened in the presence of Henry Ford II six months later in June 1970. It was designed to co-produce with Ford’s Halewood plant the company’s recently introduced Escort model, itself intended to compete head-on with Opel’s successful Kadett in the various markets of continental Europe.

At the time the plant was opened, the UK, where the Escort had been produced since the end of 1967, was not part of the European Economic Community and it was not clear whether or when it would join.

In June 2019, Ford announced it would reduce the number of shifts at Saarlouis in an effort to cut costs, as part of a Europe-wide restructuring plan that includes closing several assembly plants in the continent.

In June 2022, Ford announced it will produce its future electric models at Ford Valencia Body and Assembly, leaving the future of the Saarlouis plant past 2025 uncertain. Ford later said it would keep the plant open through 2032 if it hadn't been sold by the end of Focus production, suggesting a potential sale to another manufacturer. In June 2023, Ford announced it had found a major investor to keep the plant open, but that prospect fell through. In March 2024, the plant was closed due to a strike by workers at several supplier facilities. According to Ford, the plant will stop producing vehicles by November 2025, but 1,000 workers will remain employed at the location, keeping the site operational until a buyer is found. BYD, Magna, VDL Nedcar and Vetter Pharma were reported as potential buyers.

== Former output ==
Model	Production Time
Ford Escort	1970 - 1998 (6,517,352 produced at Saarlouis)
Ford Capri	1971 - 1975
Ford Fiesta	1976 - 1980
Ford Orion	1983 - 1990
Ford Focus	1998 - 2025
Ford Kuga	2008 - 2012
Ford C-Max	2015 - 2019

The plant produced its 5,000,000th vehicle in 1990 and the 10,000,000th on 1 July 2005.

== Gallery ==
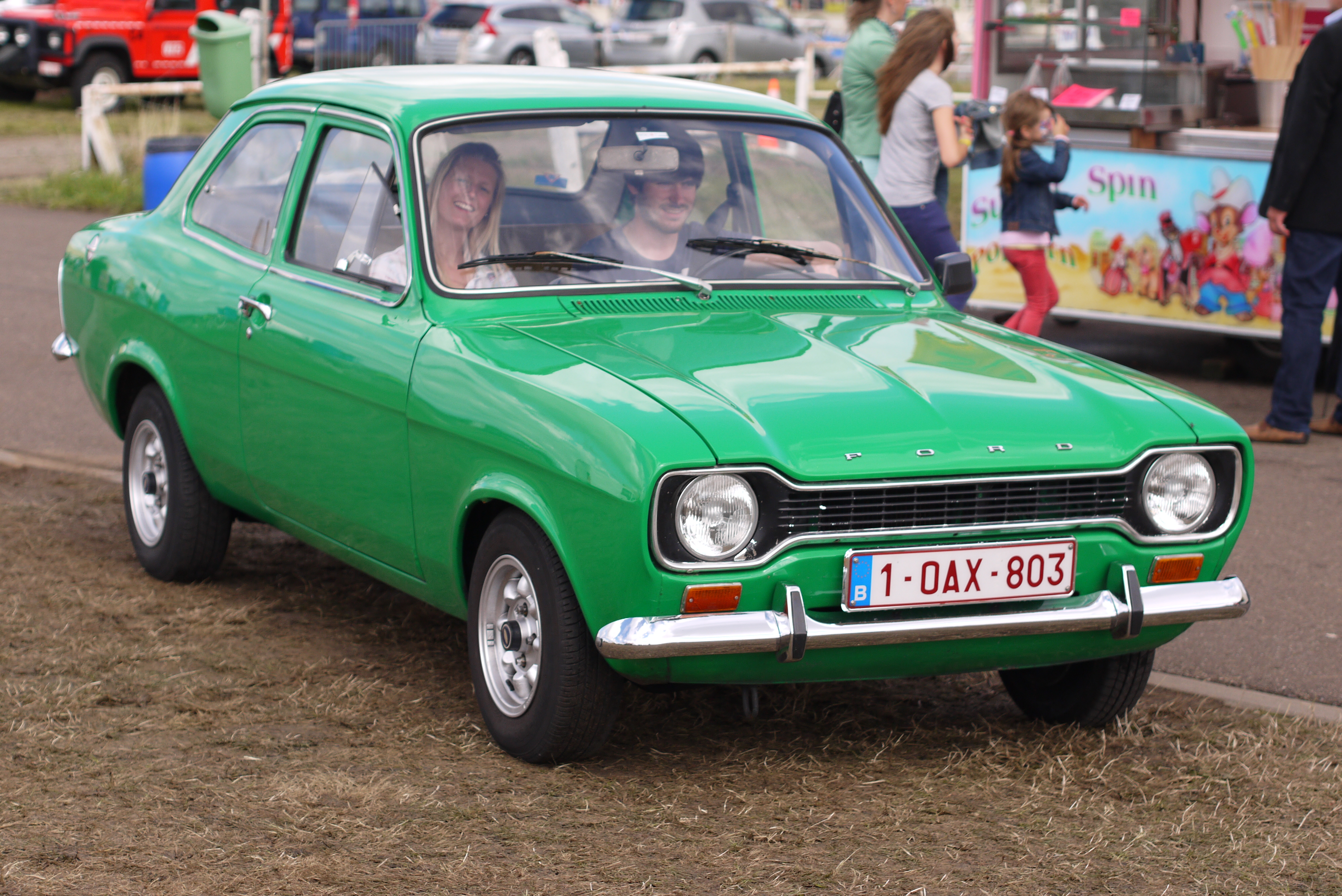
Escort MkI

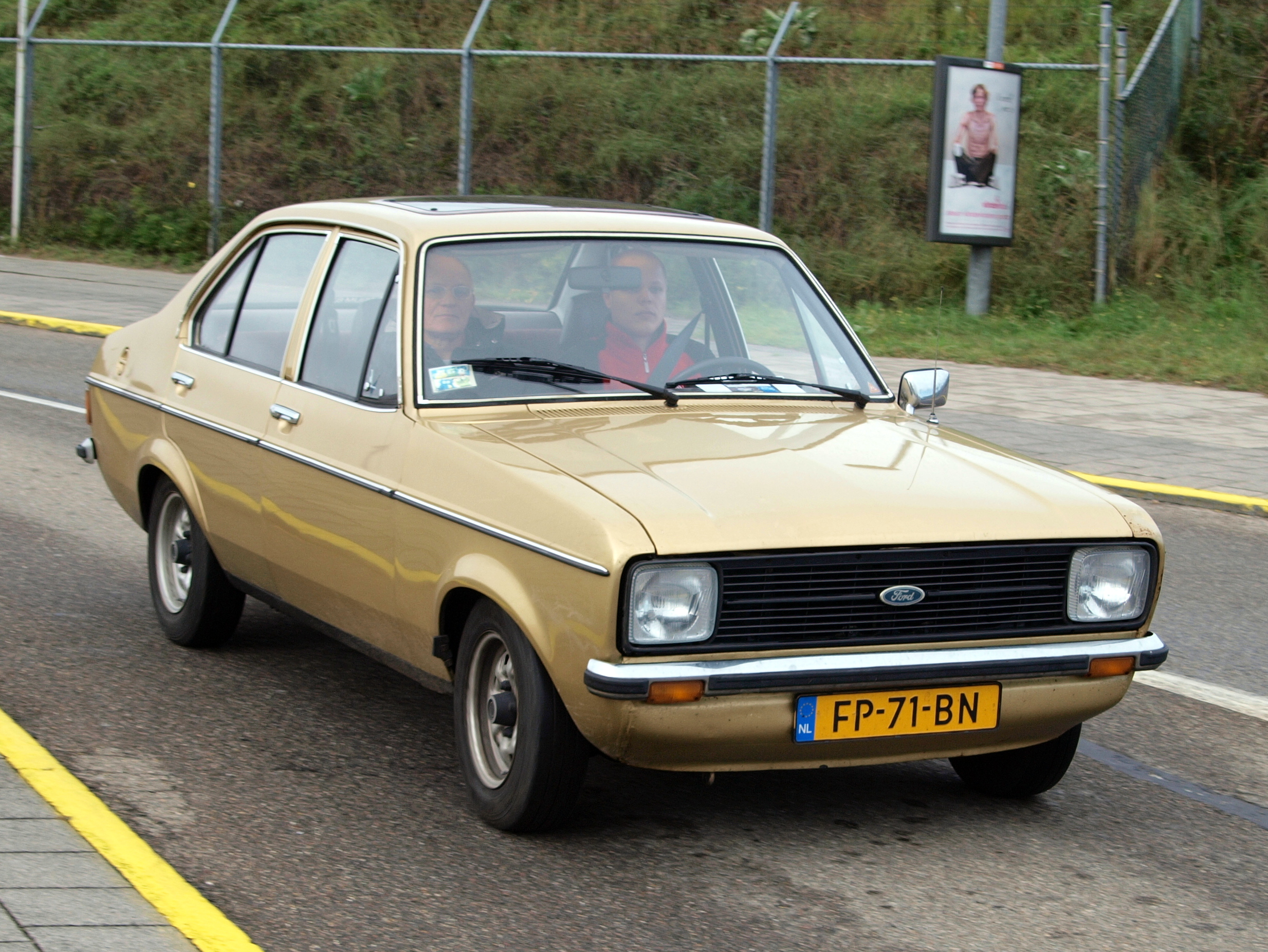
Escort MkII

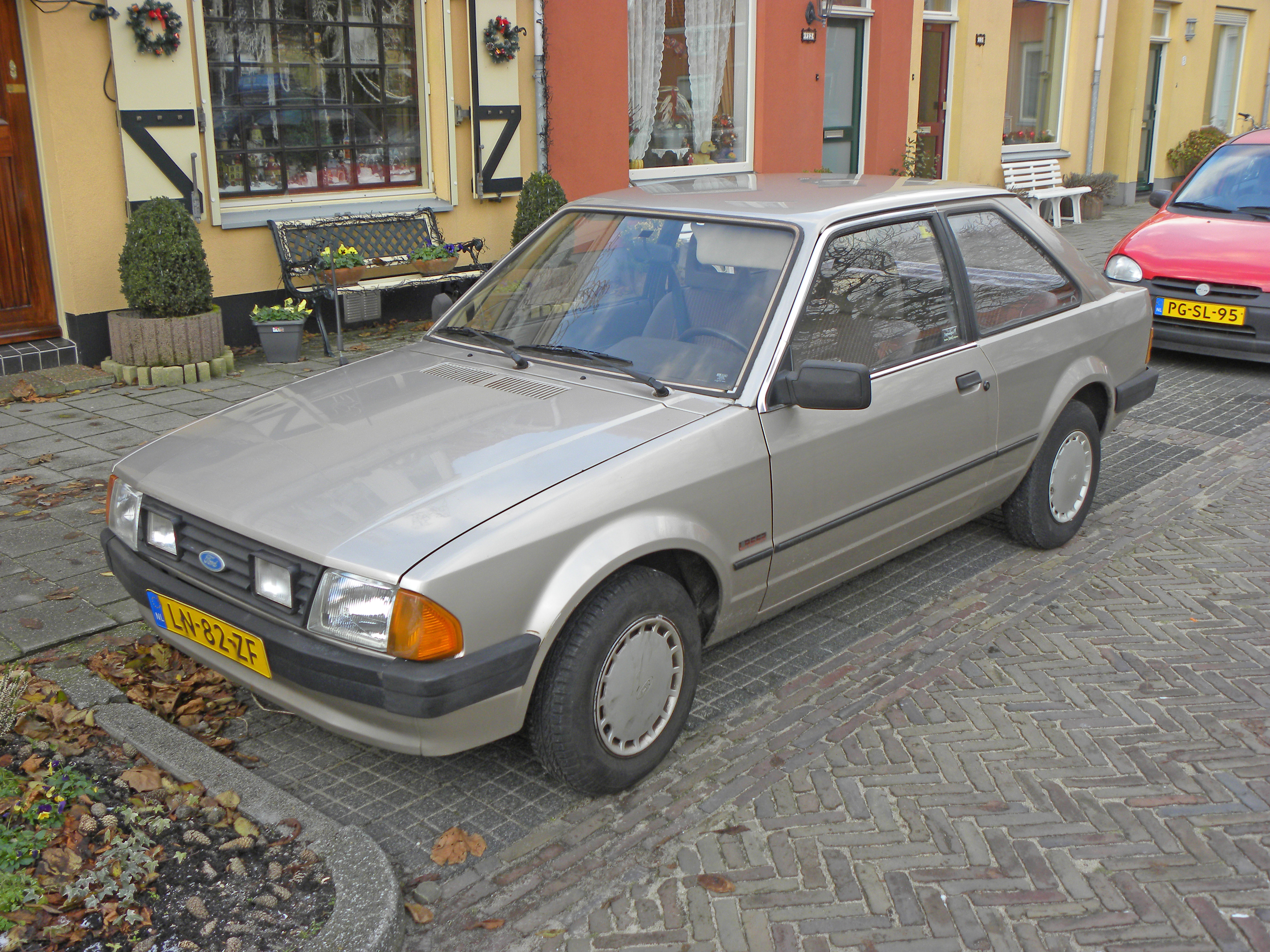
Escort MkIII

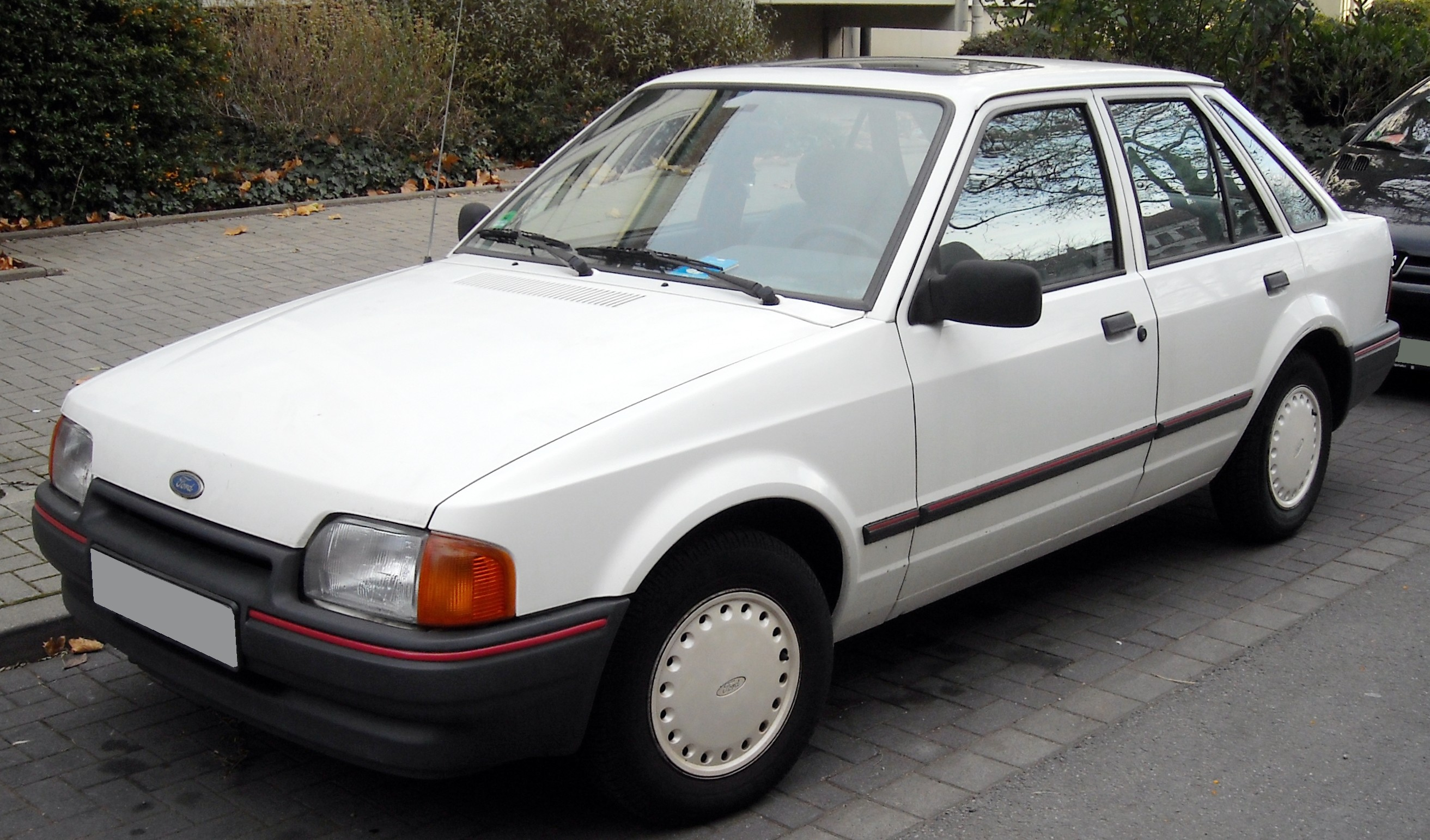
Escort MkIV

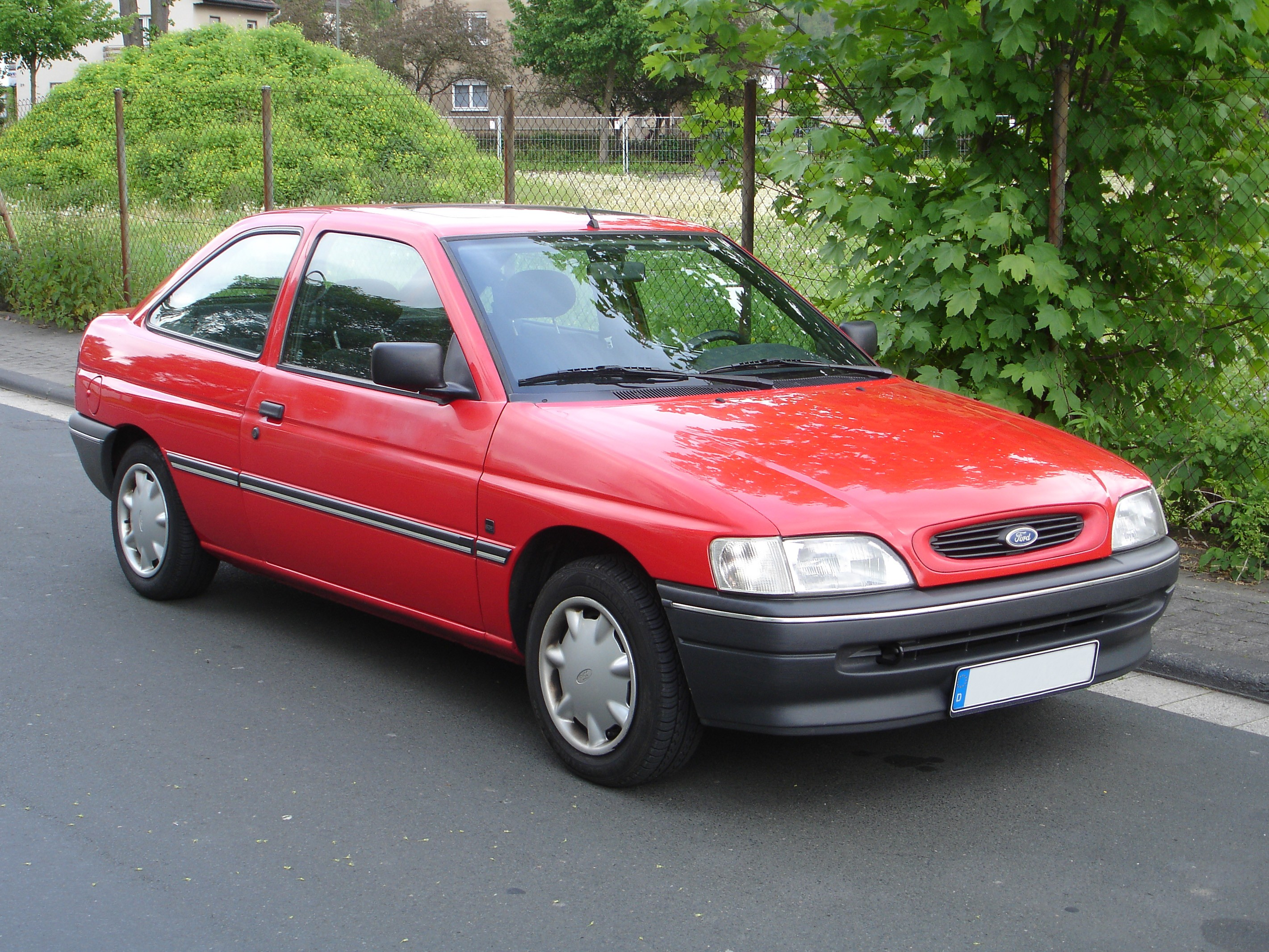
Escort MkV

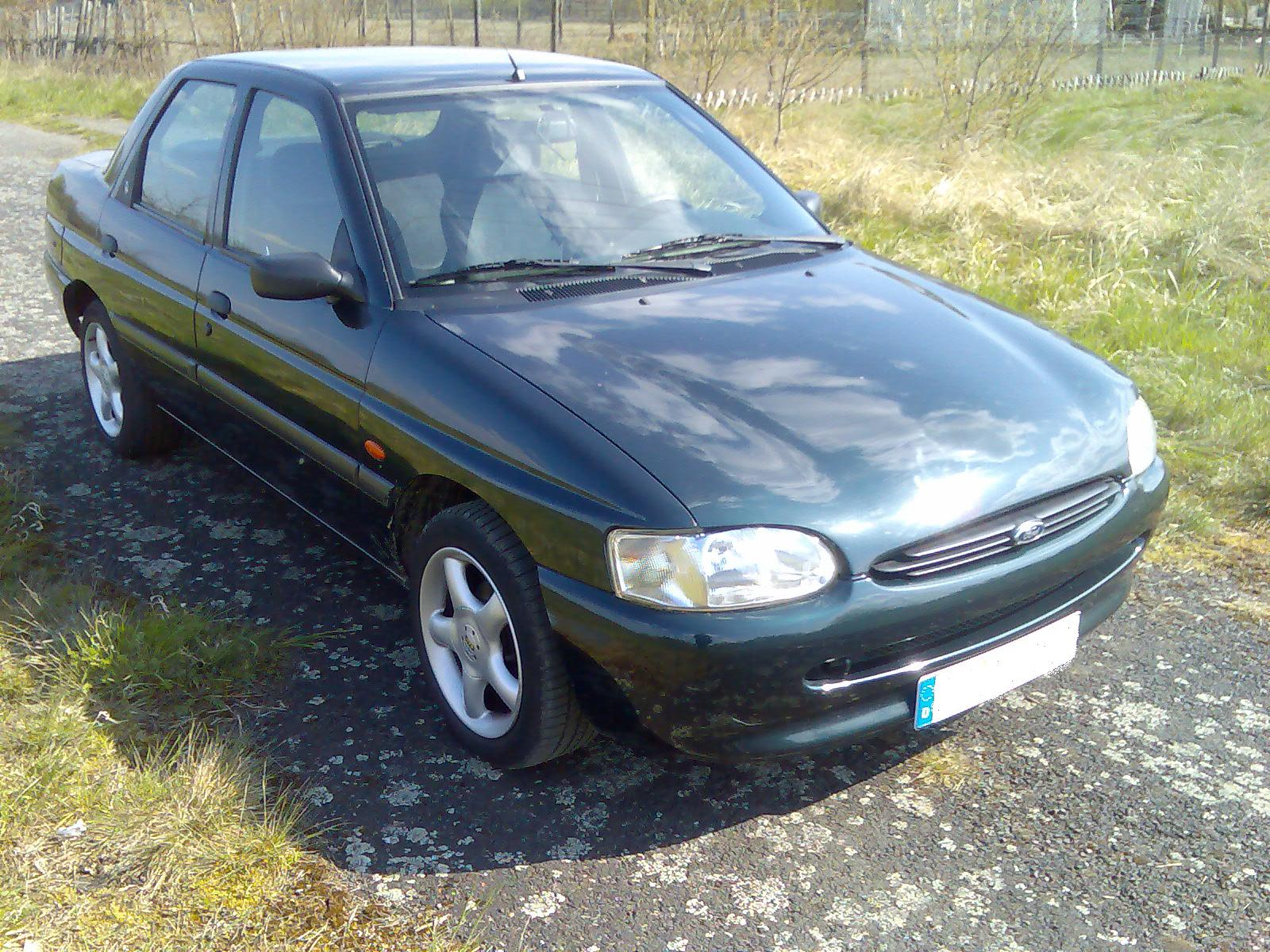
Escort MkVI

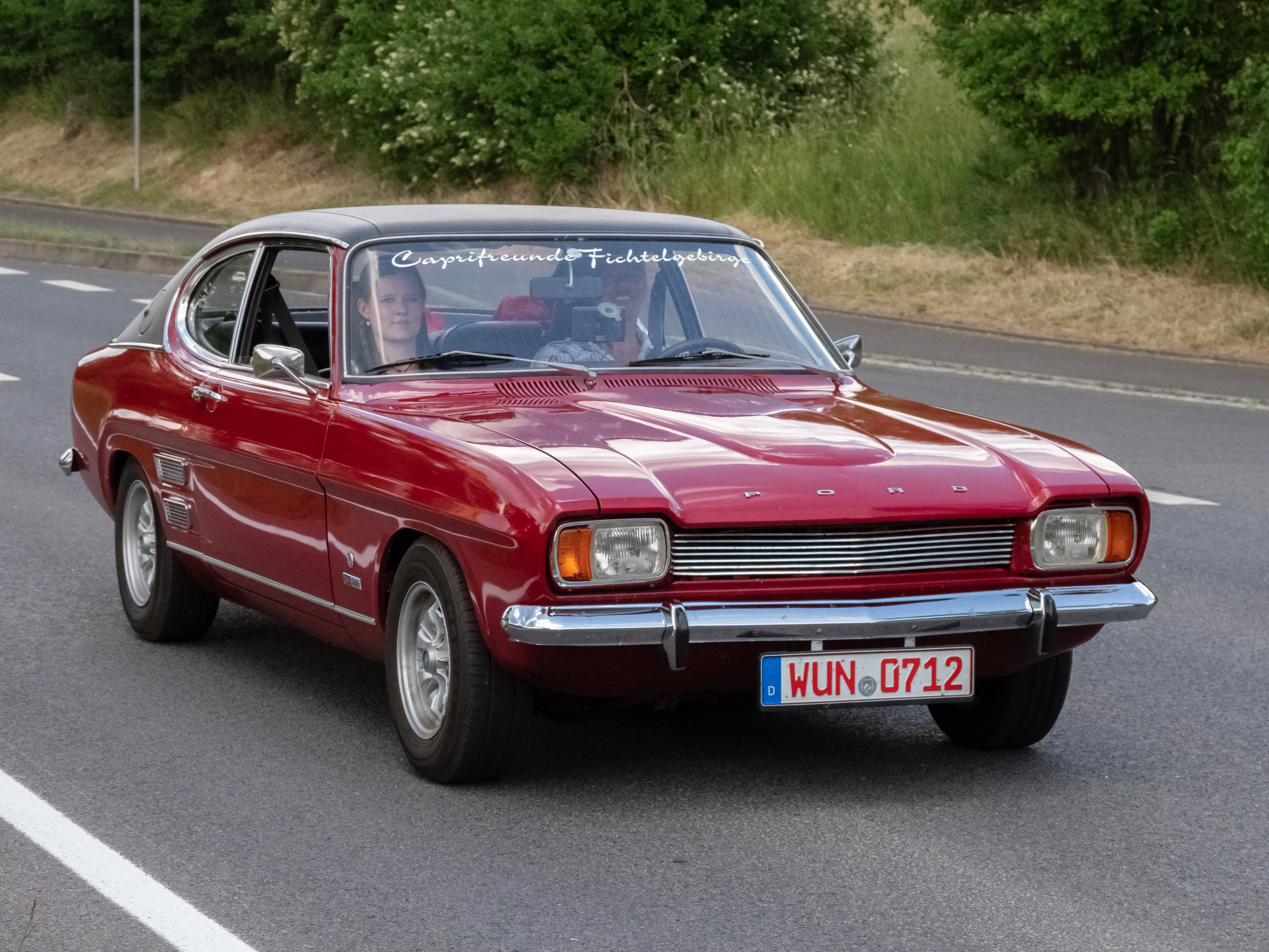
Capri MkI

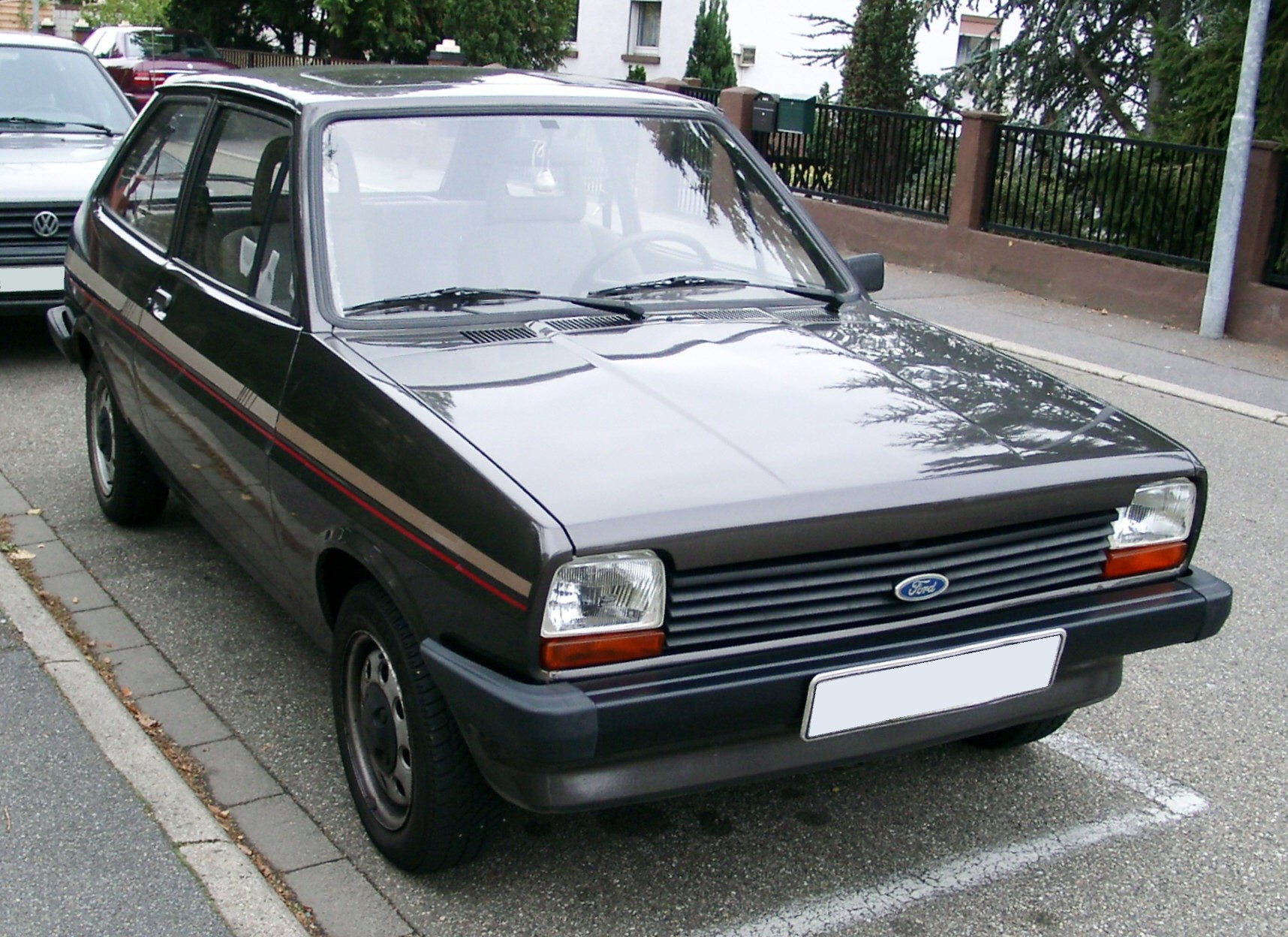
Fiesta MkI

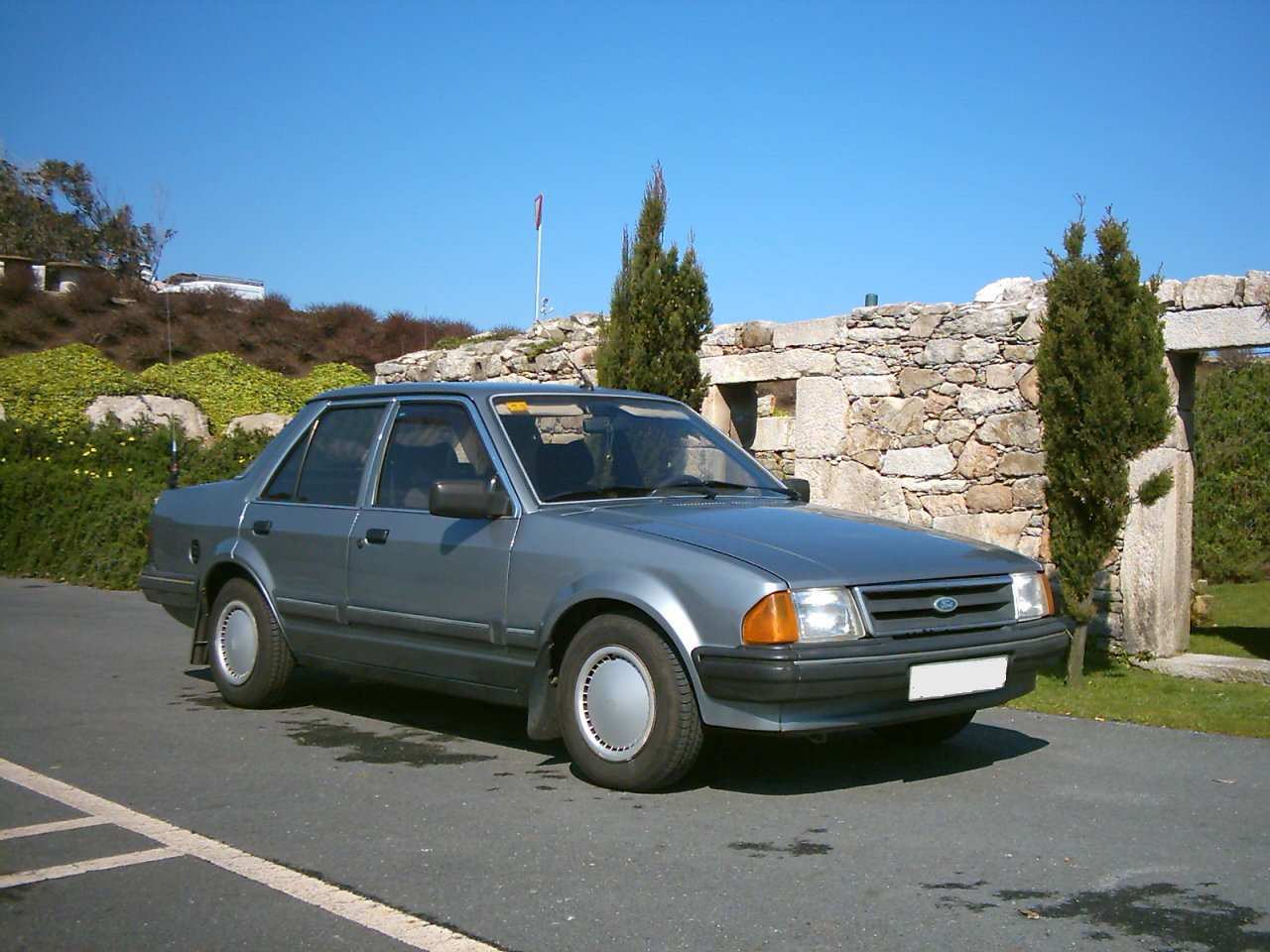
Orion MkI

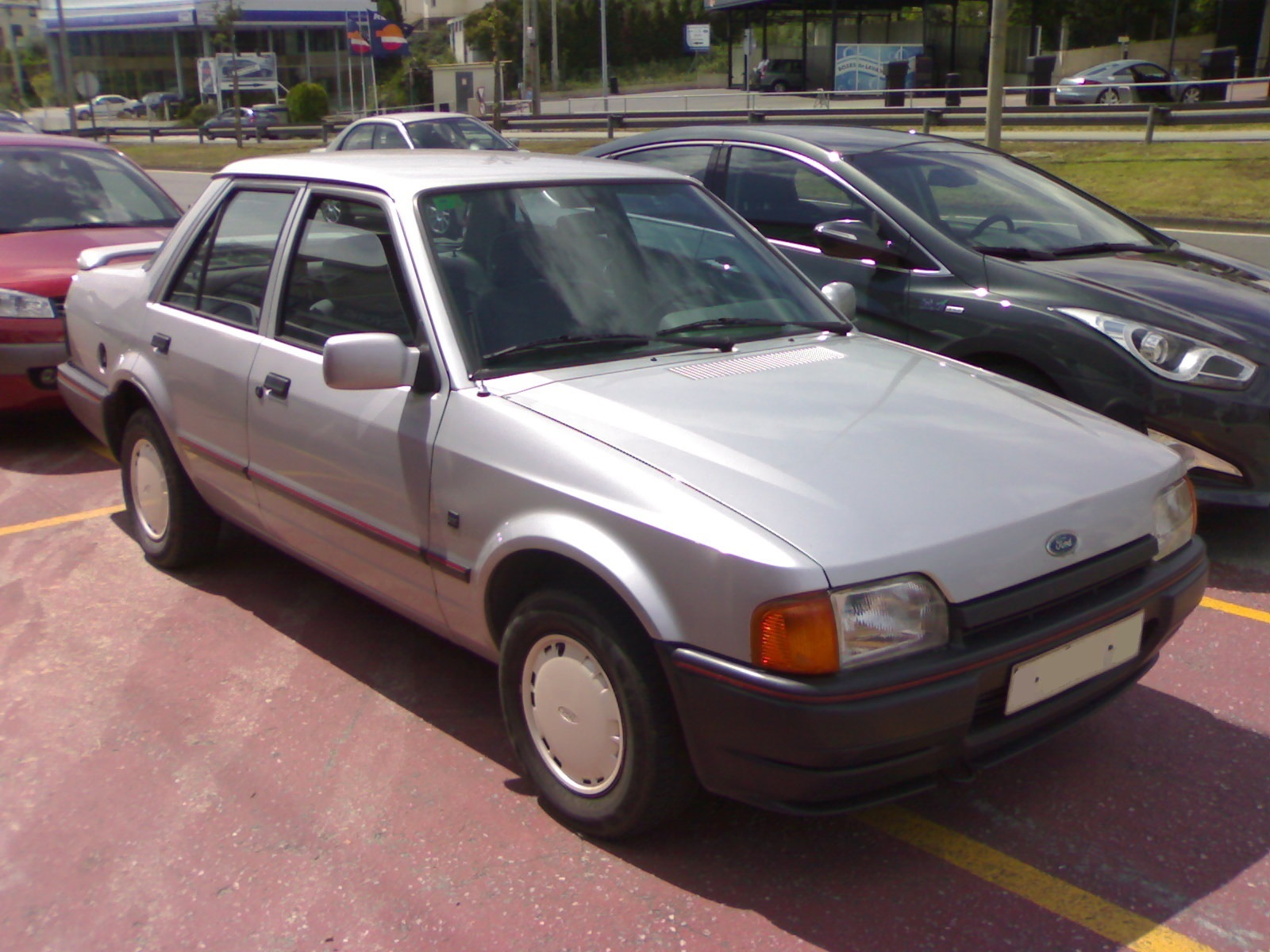
Orion MkII

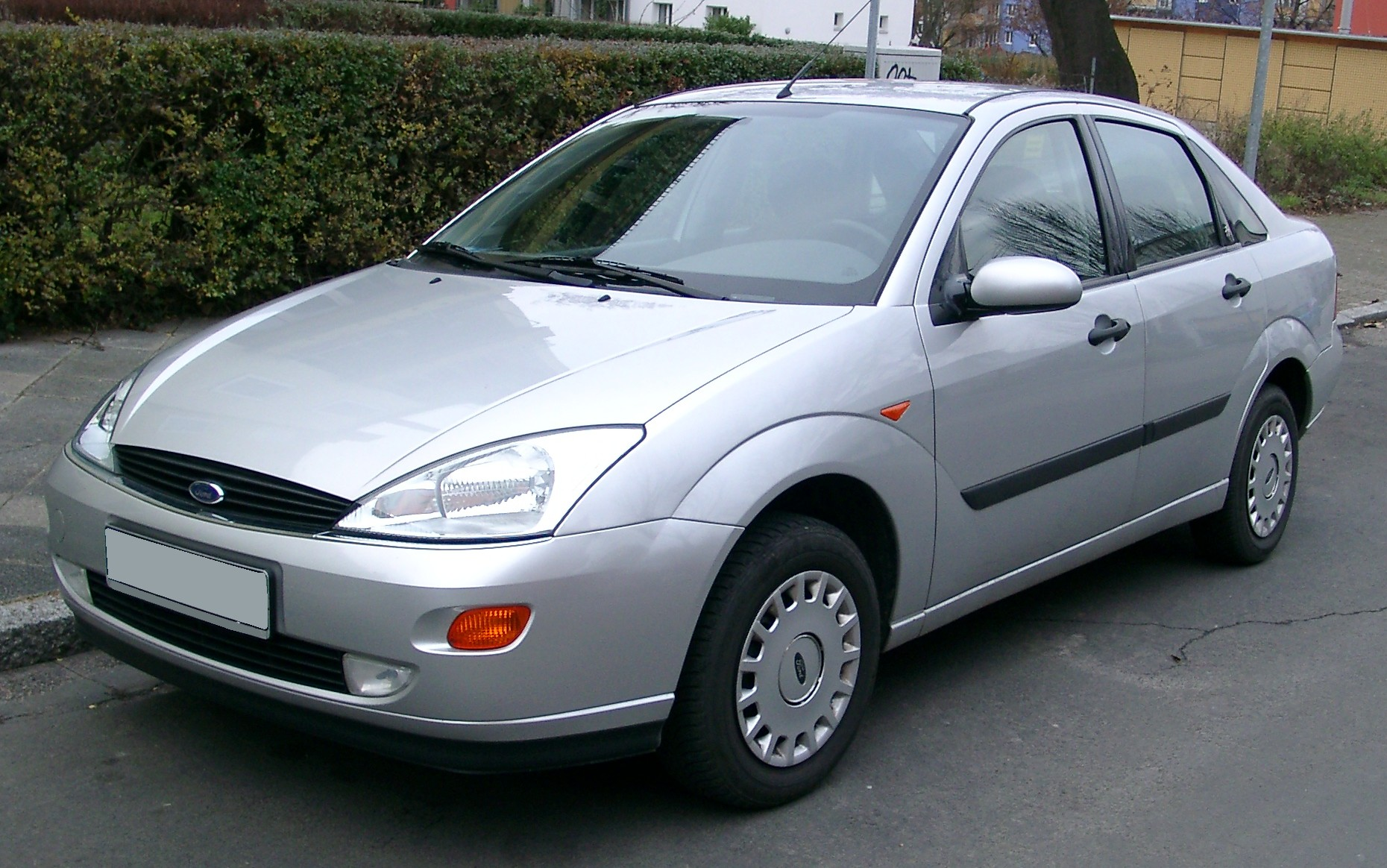
Focus MkI

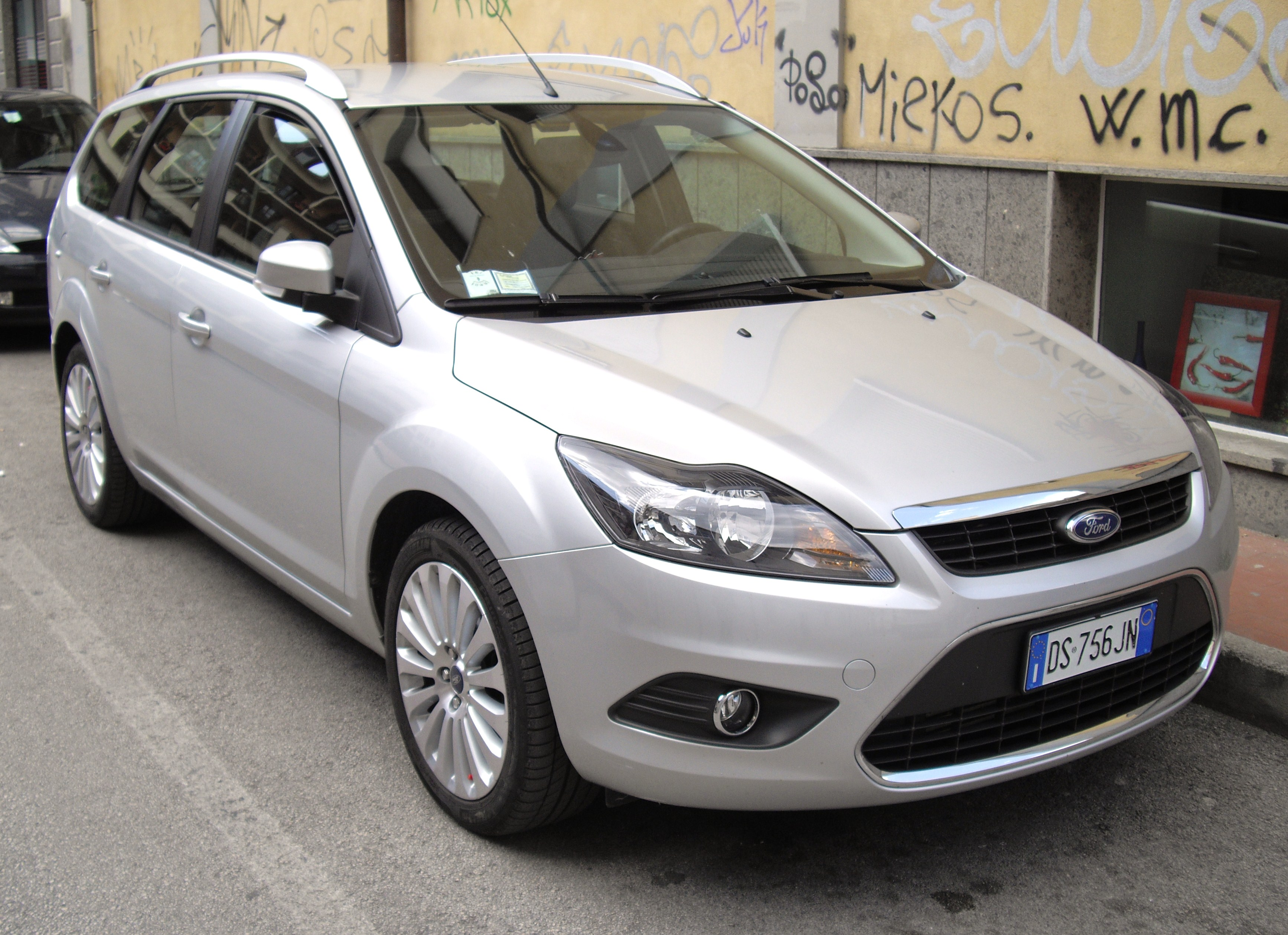
Focus MkII

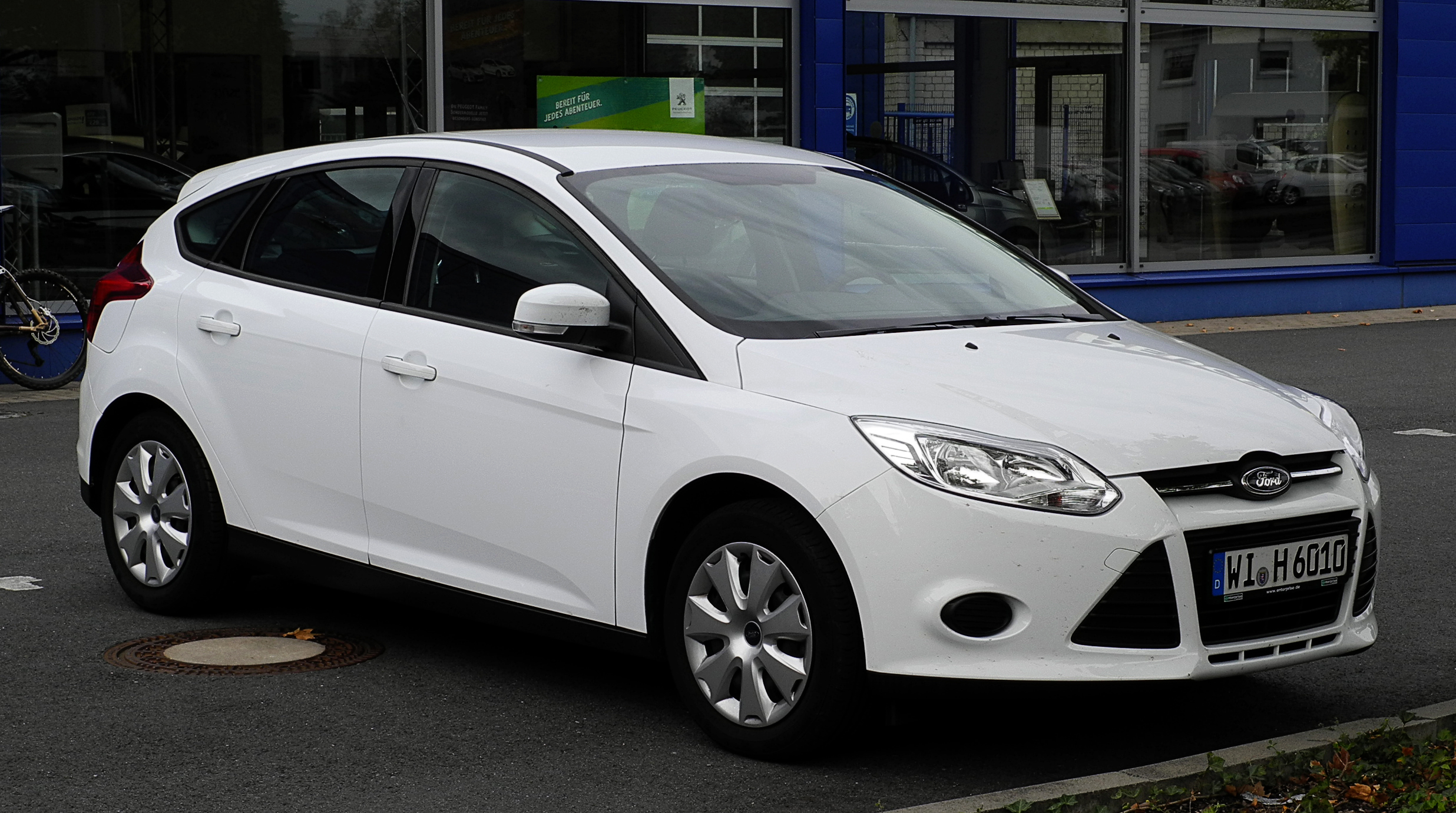
Focus MkIII

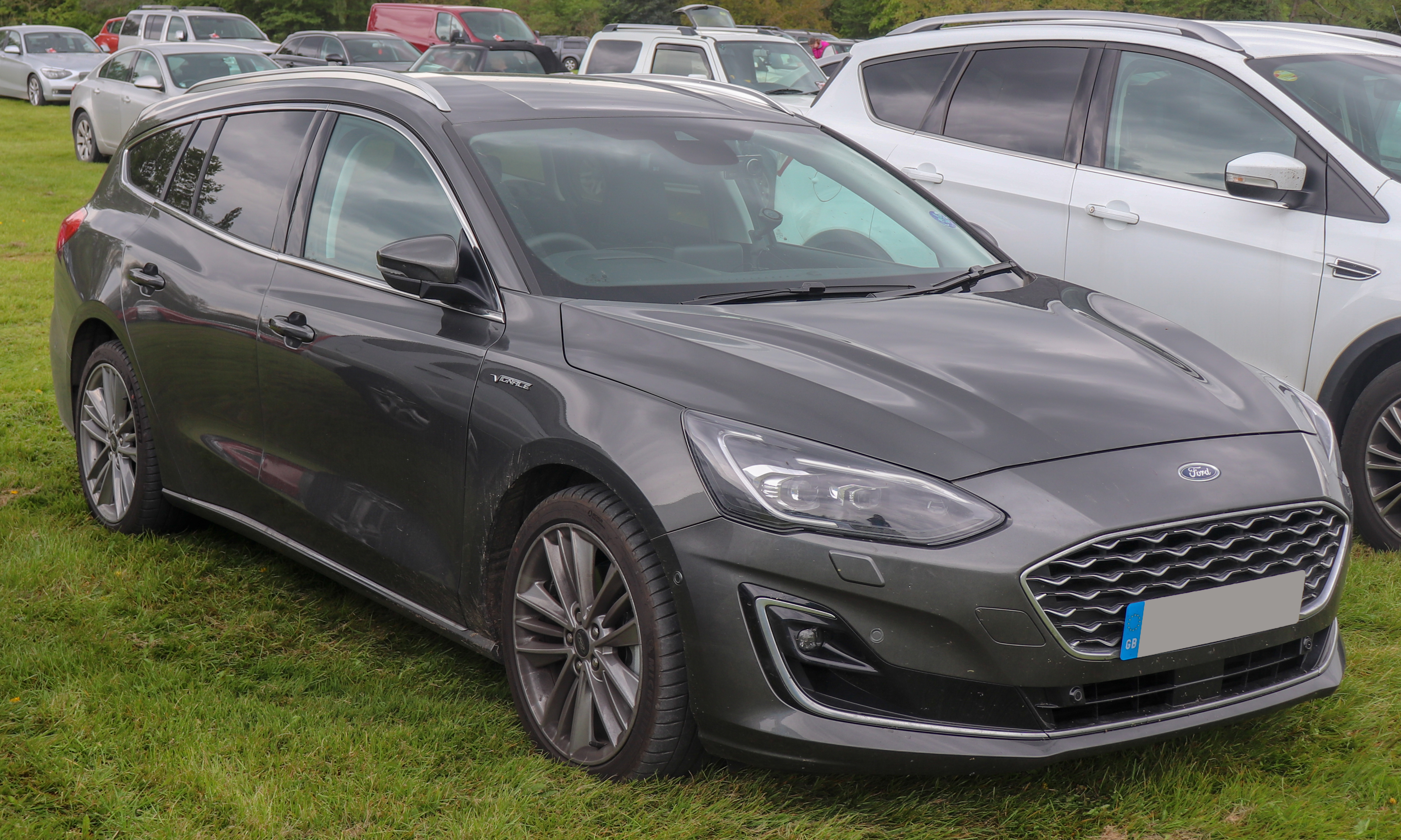
Focus MkIV

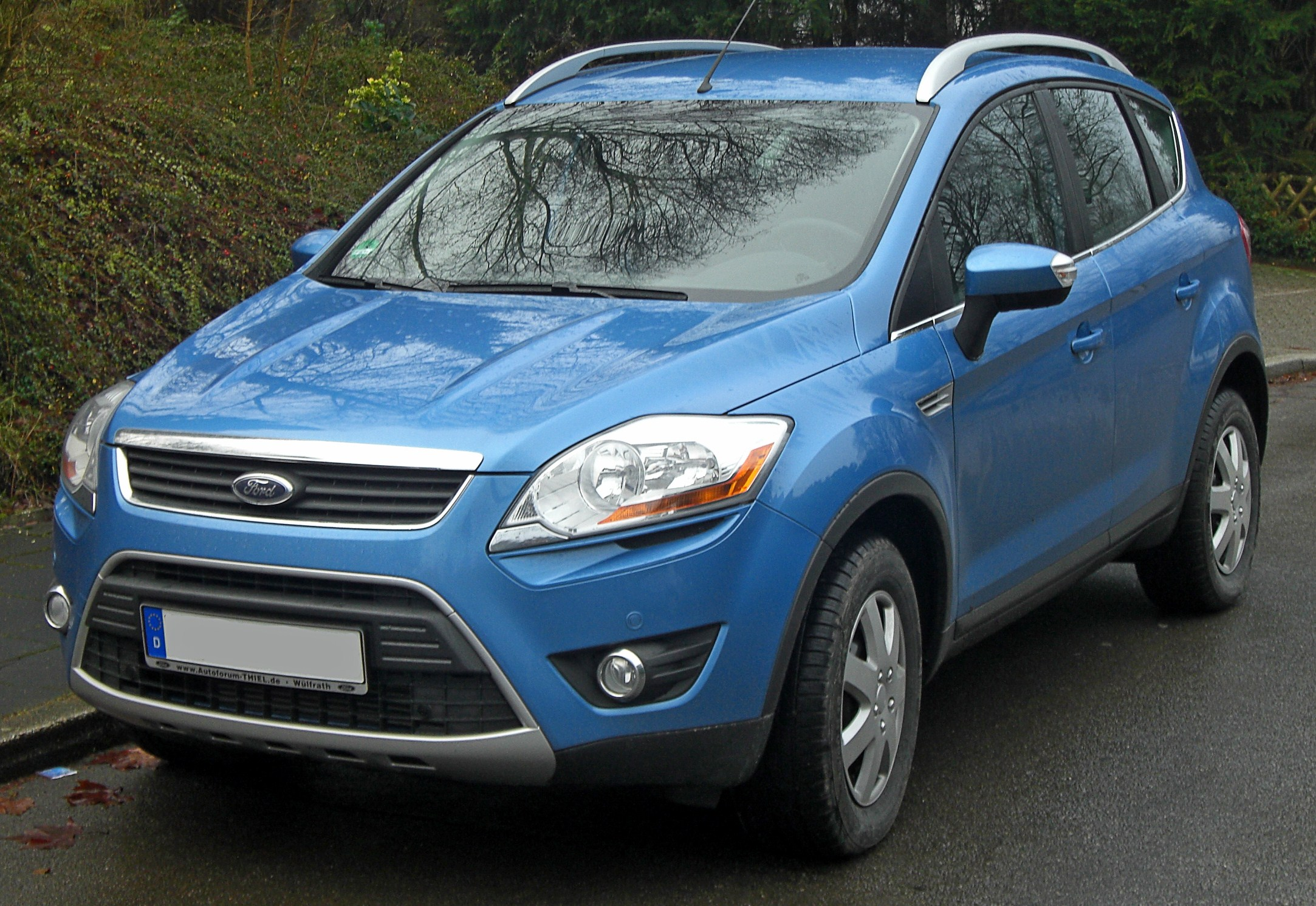
Kuga MkI

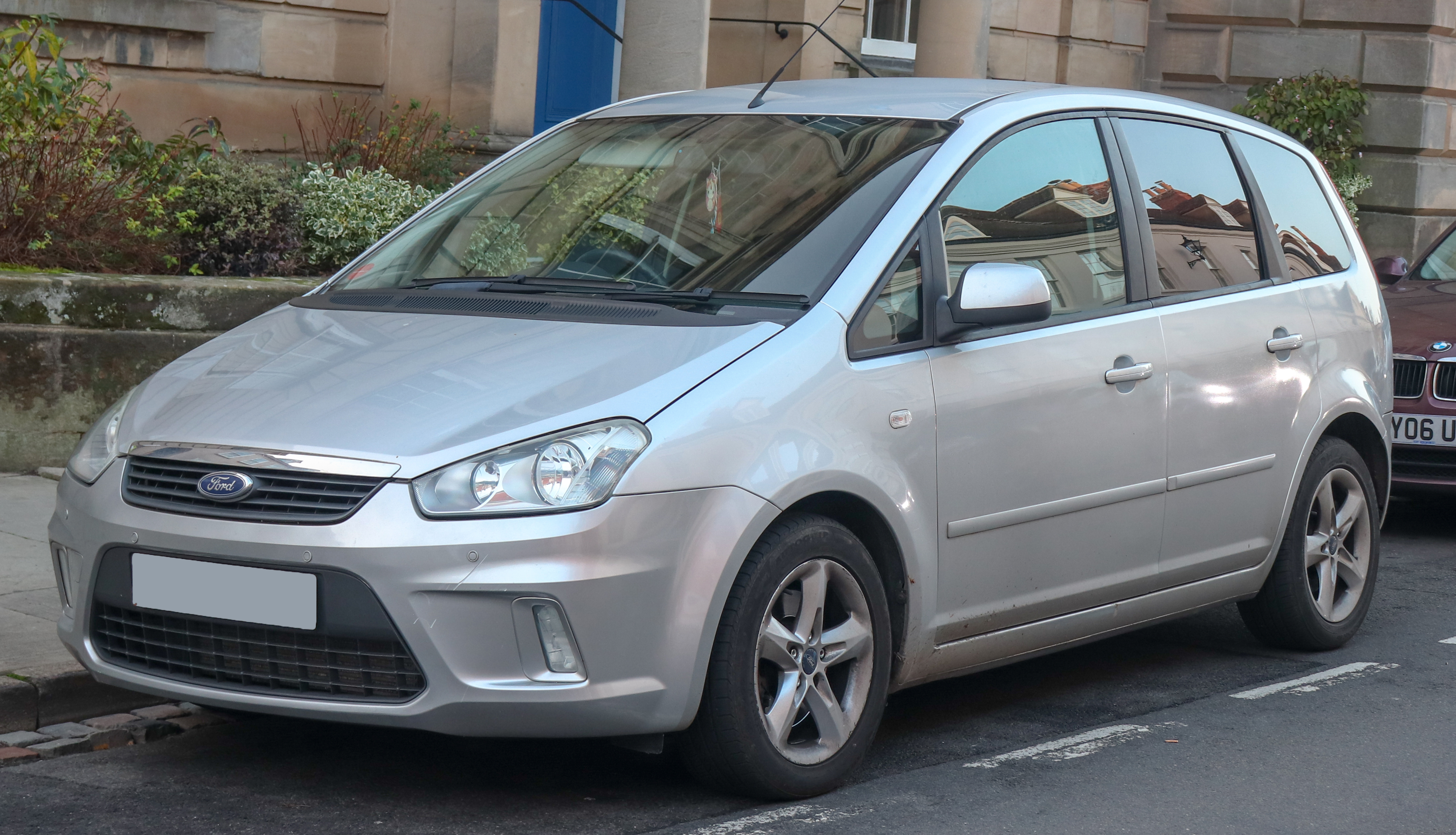
C-Max MkI

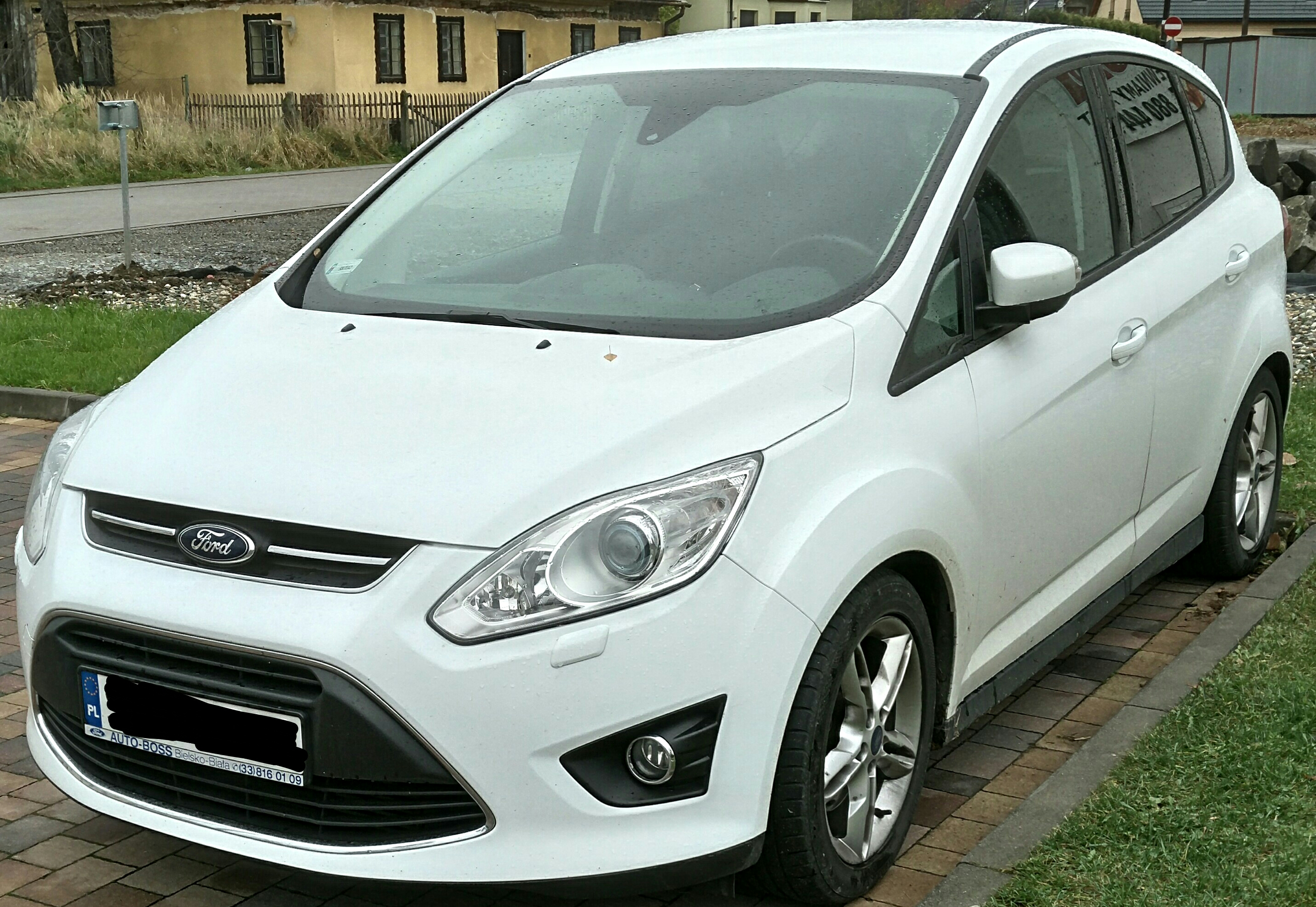
C-Max MkII

== Employment ==
Employee numbers reflecting both the changing fortunes of the small family cars produced there and the increasing automation of car production in Europe have evolved as follows:

Year	Employees
1971	5,600
1978	8,100
1996	5,600
1999	6,500
2002	7,200
2005	6,800
2015	6,199

In 2005 the plant employed 6,800 workers, organised into three teams. The plant is the largest employer in the Saarland. 79% of the employees were from Germany and 11% from France which is approximately 10 km (6.2 mi) away to the south. There were also significant numbers from Italy and Turkey. 7% of the workforce were female.

== Sources and further reading ==
This entry incorporates information from the equivalent entry in the French Wikipedia

https://uk.motor1.com/news/296339/ford-c-max-cancelled-europe/
