= TAT-14 =

Former transatlantic telephone cable

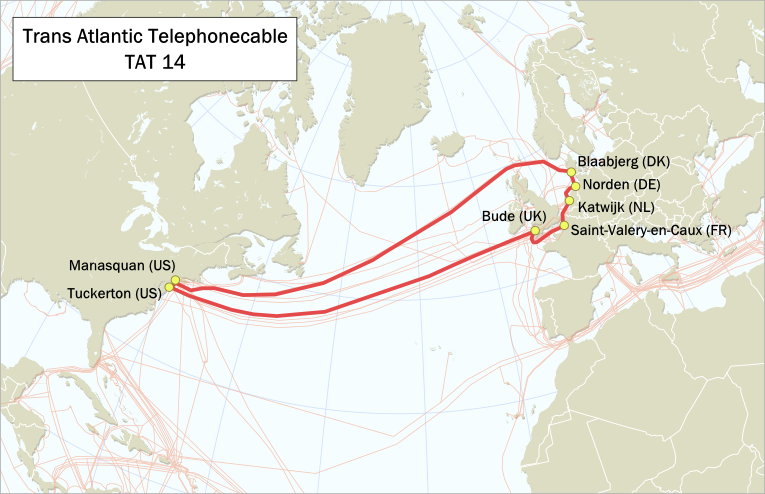
- Owners: BT Group; AT&T; Deutsche Telekom; Vodafone; Verizon Communications; Sprint Corporation; KPN; Orange S.A.; Telia Company; Telenor; Etisalat; Level 3 Communications; OTEGlobe; Singtel; KDDI; StarHub; SoftBank Group; Zayo Group; Telesur; Portugal Telecom; Slovak Telekom; Türk Telekom; TDC A/S; Tele2; Telus; Tata Communications; Telefónica; BICS; Elisa; CYTA; Rostelecom
- Landing points: Blaabjerg, Denmark; Norden, Germany; Katwijk, Netherlands; St-Valery-en-Caux, France; (United Kingdom) Widemouth Bay, UK; Tuckerton / Manasquan, New Jersey, United States
- Total length: 15,428 km (9,587 mi)
- Topology: Self-healing ring
- Design capacity: 9.38 Tbit/s
- Currently lit capacity: 3.15 Tbit/s
- Technology: Fiber optics with EDFA repeaters
- Date of first use: 21 March 2001
- Decommissioning date: 15 December 2020

TAT-14 was the 14th consortium transatlantic telecommunications cable system. In operation from 2001 to 2020, it used wavelength division multiplexing. The cable system was built from multiple pairs of fibres—one fibre in each pair was used for data carried in one direction and the other in the opposite direction. Although optical fibre can be used in both directions simultaneously, for reliability it is better not to require splitting equipment at the end of the individual fibre to separate transmit and receive signals—hence a fibre pair is used. TAT-14 used four pairs of fibres—two pairs as active and two as backup. Each fibre in each pair carried 16 wavelengths in one direction, and each wavelength carried up to an STM-256 (38,486,016 kbit/s as payload). The fibres were bundled into submarine cables connecting the United States and the European Union (United Kingdom, France, the Netherlands, Germany, and Denmark) in a ring topology.

By the time this cable went into operation, the expected long boom (term coined by Wired magazine) was already ending in the dot-com death. The overinvestment in transcontinental optical fiber capacity led to a financial crisis in private cable operators like Global Crossing.

In the diplomatic cables leak, it is revealed that the landing point in Katwijk, the Netherlands is included in a US Government list of critical infrastructure susceptible to terrorist attack.

Use of the cable was ceased on December 15, 2020, shortly after the Havfrue cable, whose main trunk also lands at Blaabjerg, was lit in November 2020. In 2021 the permanent dismantling of the system was begun.

== Cable failure ==
In November 2003, TAT-14 suffered two breaks within weeks of each other, first on the southern link between the US and UK, then on the link between France and the Netherlands which had been providing redundant service to the UK via the northern link through Denmark, resulting in disruption to Internet services in the United Kingdom.

On May 19, 2014, preliminary reports from hosting provider Digital Ocean suggested that TAT-14 was the cause for the disrupted services between the EU and the US.

== Decommissioning of the TAT-14 ==
Subsea Environmental Services has removed and recycled the cable shore-ends in the U.S., U.K., France, Denmark and The Netherlands as well as the deep-water segments in the North Atlantic.
