= Contents of the United States diplomatic cables leak =

List of classified material publicized by WikiLeaks in 2010

This is a list of notable content from the United States diplomatic cables leak that reveals the United States' political opinion towards a variety of international affairs. Beginning on November 28, 2010, WikiLeaks had been publishing classified documents of detailed correspondence—diplomatic cables—between the United States Department of State and its diplomatic missions around the world. On 1 September 2011, it released all of the Cablegate documents in its possession without redaction.

== By subject ==
The United States Department of State requires the reason for classification to be specified on all classified cables according to these classification categories:

- 1.4 a) military plans, weapons systems, or operations
- 1.4 b) foreign government information
- 1.4 c) intelligence activities, sources, or methods, or cryptology
- 1.4 d) foreign relations or foreign activities of the United States, including confidential sources
- 1.4 e) scientific, technological or economic matters relating to national security; which includes defense against transnational terrorism
- 1.4 f) United States government programs for safeguarding nuclear materials or facilities
- 1.4 g) vulnerabilities or capabilities of systems, installations, infrastructures, projects or plans, or protection services relating to the national security, which includes defense against transnational terrorism
- 1.4 h) weapons of mass destruction

Of the 3,420 cables published as of February 3, 2011, 2,647 are classified confidential or secret. Of these, the vast majority are labeled 1.4 (b) or 1.4 (d), or both, indicating that they contain information about foreign relations or governments. 107 of the cables are labeled 1.4 (c).

== By transnational organization ==
=== United Nations ===
In July 2009, a confidential cable originating from the United States Department of State, and under United States Secretary of State Hillary Clinton's name, ordered US diplomats to spy on Ban Ki-moon, Secretary-General of the United Nations, and other top UN officials. The intelligence information the diplomats were ordered to gather included biometric information (which apparently included DNA, fingerprints, and iris scans), passwords, and personal encryption keys used in private and commercial networks for official communications. It also included Internet and intranet usernames, e-mail addresses, web site URLs useful for identification, credit card numbers, frequent flyer account numbers, and work schedules. The targeted human intelligence was requested in a process known as the National Humint Collection Directive, and was aimed at foreign diplomats of US allies as well.

Further leaked material revealed that the guidance in the cables was actually written by the National Clandestine Service of the Central Intelligence Agency before being sent out under Clinton's name, as the CIA cannot directly instruct State Department personnel.

The disclosed cables on the more aggressive intelligence gathering went back to 2008, when they went out under Condoleezza Rice's name during her tenure as Secretary of State.

=== European Union ===
Herman Van Rompuy, President of the European Council, was quoted as saying to Howard Gutman, U.S. Ambassador to Belgium, that the "EU no longer believes in the success of the military mission in Afghanistan". He also added "Europe is doing it [the War in Afghanistan] and will go along out of deference to the United States, but not out of deference to Afghanistan".

In 2007, with reference to negotiations with the EU over the adoption of genetically modified crops, the U.S. Ambassador to France recommended that "we calibrate a target retaliation list that causes some pain across the EU".

=== Council of Europe ===
According to a cable from the US embassy in Strasbourg, European human rights standards are "an irritant", and their champion, the Council of Europe, "is an organisation with an inferiority complex and, simultaneously, an overambitious agenda".

=== NATO ===
NATO created plans to defend the Baltic states and Poland known as Operation Eagle Guardian. Nine British, German, U.S. and Polish divisions have been designated for combat operations in the event of a Russian attack. In 2011, NATO wanted to conduct exercises for this new plan. The U.S. also offered to Poland to station special naval forces in Gdańsk and Gdynia as well as stationing F-16 fighter aircraft and C-130 Hercules transport aircraft in Poland.

=== Catholic Church ===
After the election of Pope Benedict XVI, US diplomats recommended that the US Department of State seek to 'help shape his approach as he begins to grapple with the world beyond the Vatican's walls'.

== By region ==
Other information in the tranche of cables released by WikiLeaks on November 28, 2010, and subsequent days included the following:

=== Global ===
==== Copenhagen Accord on climate change ====
Diplomatic cables show how the U.S. "used spying, threats and promises of aid" to gain support for the Copenhagen Accord, under which commitments are made to reduce emissions. The emergent U.S. emissions pledge was the lowest by any leading nation.

==== List of infrastructure critical to U.S. national security ====
Perhaps the most sensitive of all releases as of 6 December was a cable from the U.S. State Department sent in February 2009 referencing the Critical Foreign Dependencies Initiative and listing installations and infrastructure worldwide that it considered critical to protect U.S. interests from terrorists. Before releasing this list WikiLeaks had deliberately removed details of names and locations, but much was still revealed. Ostensibly the list does not include any military facilities. Instead it includes key facilities that if attacked could disrupt the global supply chain and global communications, as well as goods and services important to the U.S. and its economy.

In the cable the U.S. State Department requests American diplomats to identify installations overseas "whose loss could critically impact the public health, economic security, and/or national and homeland security of the United States". The order was under the direction of the U.S. Department for Homeland Security in co-ordination with the U.S. Department of State.

These are noted excerpts from the list:

- Submarine communications cables
  - across the Pacific Ocean to New Zealand, Australia, China and other U.S. allies in Asia.
  - across the Atlantic Ocean, particularly those from the U.K. and Ireland northwards.
- Major port hubs, particularly in China, Japan and South Korea.
- Critical sea lanes, such as the Strait of Hormuz, the Panama Canal and the Strait of Malacca.
- The Baku–Tbilisi–Ceyhan pipeline as well as many other strategic pipelines criss-crossing Eurasia.
  - In connection to these pipelines also Georgia, Azerbaijan and Belarus are on the list.
- Mines that produce rare earths and other much-needed metals, especially in South Africa and Australia.
  - Several underwater pipelines are listed in Japan, China and Britain.
- A long list of pharmaceutical facilities in Europe.
- Dams close to the U.S. border.
- Ostensibly missing are also civil nuclear power plants outside of the United States.

The publishing of this particular cable, which had been classified secret and not for review by non-U.S. personnel, was followed by strong criticism. U.S. State Department spokesman Philip J. Crowley said the disclosure "gives a group like al-Qaeda a targeting list". British prime minister David Cameron stated that the list was damaging to the national security of both his country and the United States, "and elsewhere". WikiLeaks spokesman Kristinn Hrafnsson said with reference to the cable: "This further undermines claims made by the US Government that its embassy officials do not play an intelligence-gathering role." Part of the cable read: "Posts are not/not being asked to consult with host governments with respect to this request."

== By company ==
=== BAE Systems ===
In 2002, BAE Systems sold Tanzania an overpriced radar. Objections by the then British development secretary Clare Short were overruled by Prime Minister Tony Blair.

=== Boeing ===
A series of cables show how US diplomats and senior politicians intervene on behalf of Boeing to help boost the company's sales.

=== Bouygues ===
- According to a January 2010 cable, "Bouygues Batiment International, a major French construction company, has relocated large numbers of its staff to Turkmenistan from other international operations that have closed due to the international economic downturn." In the same cable, the author comments: "Repeated visits by the company's leadership to praise the president's economic policies and to stay in his good graces helps to guarantee a stream of 'grandiose' projects".

=== Chevron Corporation ===
- On the authority of the Iraqi prime minister, the Chevron Corporation has been involved in negotiations over investment in Iran, despite U.N. sanctions against Iran.

=== DynCorp ===
Employees of DynCorp, a US government contractor funded by U.S. tax dollars, in Afghanistan paid for the services of underage "dancing boys", apparently a euphemistic reference to Bacha bazi, which is considered child prostitution. The boys were auctioned off to be sexually abused by Afghan policemen, with some to be kept as sex slaves and participate in events funded by DynCorp.

=== Itera ===
Russian-based company Itera gifted Turkmen President Gurbanguly Berdimuhamedow with a yacht worth €60 million.

=== Lockheed Martin ===
Lobbying for a major Norwegian defense contract for the F-35, and with an eye on further contracts, the US Ambassador to Sweden urged that the export license for the rival fighter's radar be delayed until after the Norwegian decision, while the US Ambassador to Norway sought high-level political advocacy, warned that an adverse decision would "weaken one of the strongest pillars of our bilateral relationship" and damage Norway's long-term interests, and backed ways of "helping the GON (Government of Norway) recognise the seriousness of their decision". In the aftermath of the decision, the Norwegian Deputy Defense Minister said it would be 'very helpful' if the US government were to confirm there had been no political pressure to buy the plane.

=== McDonald's ===
McDonald's attempted to pressure the U.S. government to stall the implementation of the Dominican Republic–Central America Free Trade Agreement until El Salvador appointed "neutral judges" in a $24 million lawsuit against the company in 2006.

=== MasterCard and Visa ===
U.S. diplomats lobbied Russian politicians for U.S. credit-card companies MasterCard and Visa Inc. A law proposal currently undergoing discussion in the Russian State Duma proposes a National Payment Card System to collect all credit-card fees for domestic transactions. This would result in a revenue loss for MasterCard and Visa.

=== Monsanto ===
- In a 2007 cable, the US ambassador to France, Craig Roberts Stapleton, recommended "retaliation" against European "targets" in order to defend Monsanto sales of genetically modified organisms (GMOs) in Europe, where controversy over GMOs is strong. In the cable, the French decision to suspend Monsanto's MON 810 patented seed product line was described as "damaging" and not "science-based". The French government's "apparent recommitment" to the precautionary principle written in the French Constitution was also referred to as "damaging". In the cable, Stapleton stated, "Country team Paris recommends that we calibrate a target retaliation list that causes some pain across the EU since this is a collective responsibility, but that also focuses in part on the worst culprits. The list should be measured rather than vicious and must be sustainable over the long term, since we should not expect an early victory."
- A 2007 cable reports a meeting between several agricultural biotechnology companies (Dow Chemical Company, DuPont, Monsanto) where they raise concerns to the French governments stance on agricultural biotechnology. The concerns included the destruction of test fields by activists, whether French police will enforce vandalism laws, whether French farmers will have to be on a public list saying they are growing GMOs, and whether France will follow EU approval guidelines. Also the cable discussed an approval dispute about a genetically modified potato variety from BASF which the French government showed signs of approving, but later ruled against. No United States government representatives were involved.
- A 2009 cable reports the May 13 meeting of US diplomats report with Monsanto's Director for Biotechnology for Spain and Portugal. The representative voices concerns over increased "Anti-biotechnology activists in the EU" and their attempts to build support for a prohibition on cultivation of the MON810 corn variety. The cable concludes with an action request for continued support of "Spain's science-based agricultural biotechnology position" in response to the requests of Monsanto and Spanish Ministry of Environment and Rural and Marine Affairs State Secretary Josep Puxeu.

=== Pfizer ===
The drug company Pfizer hired private investigators to find evidence against the Nigerian attorney general Michael Aondoakaa to pressure him into dropping charges against the company. Pfizer was sued in Nigeria over the deaths of children in drug trials.

=== Petro-Canada ===
Libya's state oil company called in a senior Petro-Canada official with a threat to nationalize the firm's operations in Libya if the Canadian government refused to apologize to the Libyan government. Foreign Affairs Minister Lawrence Cannon had earlier promised a tongue-lashing for the hero's welcome that Libya extended to a man convicted in the 1988 Lockerbie bombing. While the Libyan government did not follow through on its threat, it did issue an order on September 30, 2009, for Petro-Canada to cut production by 50 percent.

=== Royal Dutch Shell ===
Ann Pickard, Royal Dutch Shell's then-vice-president for Sub-Saharan Africa, wrote that Shell had "seconded people to all the relevant ministries" of the Nigerian government, and therefore was informed about all important political decisions. She said the Nigerian government had ""forgotten" about the extent of Shell's infiltration and was unaware of how much the company knew about its deliberations". The cables showed that Shell shared and swapped intelligence with the US. After the release of the cables, Celestine AkpoBari, of Social Action Nigeria, said "Shell and the government of Nigeria are two sides of the same coin. Shell is everywhere. They have an eye and an ear in every ministry of Nigeria. They have people on the payroll in every community, which is why they get away with everything. They are more powerful than the Nigerian government." Ben Amunwa of the London-based oil watchdog Platform said "Shell claims to have nothing to do with Nigerian politics. In reality, Shell works deep inside the system, and has long exploited political channels in Nigeria to its own advantage".

== Diplomatic analysis of individual leaders ==
The leaked diplomatic cables provided criticism of varying degrees by U.S. embassy staff of their host governments: These details were quite embarrassing to both leaders as well as the U.S. officials who worked on these cables.

== See also ==
- List of public disclosures of classified information
- Foreign policy of the United States
