= Corumbá (mine) =

Iron ore mine

Coordinates: 19°10′14.25″S 57°38′10.81″W

- Interactive map of Corumbá

Location
- Location: Mato Grosso do Sul, Brazil

Production
- Products: Iron ore (2,000,000 tonnes per annum)

Owner
- Company: Vale S.A.

Corumbá is an iron ore mine located in the western Brazilian state of Mato Grosso do Sul, near the border with Bolivia. The mine is located east of highway 262 about 15 km south of the city of Corumbá. The mine is of open pit construction, producing approximately 2 million tonnes per year of iron ore which is partially processed on site before being moved by barge along the Paraguay and Paraná Rivers to shipping ports along the Atlantic coast. The mine currently employs approximately 650 persons. The mine is currently owned by Vale S.A., who acquired it from multinational mining giant Rio Tinto Group in 2009 for US$814M.
