= Vetter Pharma =

German pharmaceutical company

Coordinates: 47°47′40″N 9°37′15″E

Vetter Pharma-Fertigung GmbH & Co. KG
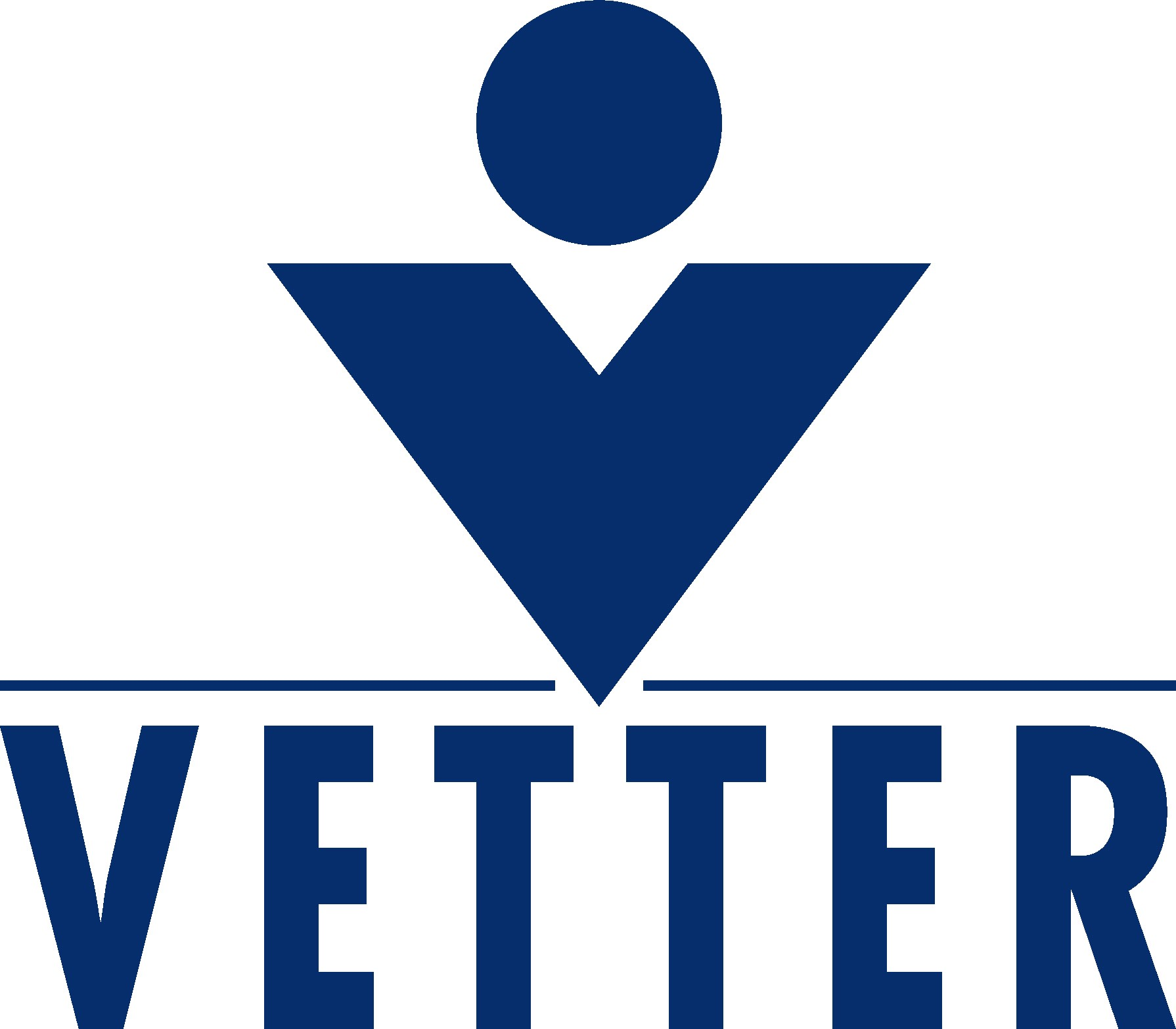
- Type: GmbH & Co. KG
- Founded: 1950
- Headquarters: Germany, Ravensburg
- Key people: Managing Directors: Henryk Badack; Titus Ottinger; Carsten Press
- Services: drug product development; clinical manufacturing; commercial manufacturing; life cycle management; device assembly and packaging; analytical services; regulatory support; logistic services
- Revenue: €1.259 billion (2025)
- Number of employees: 6,327 FTE (2025)
- Website: vetter-pharma.com

Vetter Pharma-Fertigung GmbH & Co. KG is a German privately owned Contract Development and Manufacturing Organization (CDMO) specializing in aseptic fill-and-finish manufacturing services for vials, syringes, and cartridges. It is headquartered in Ravensburg, Baden-Württemberg, and has manufacturing sites in Germany, Austria, the United States, as well as sales offices in Singapore, Japan, South Korea, and China. The company provides clinical and commercial manufacturing, device assembly and packaging, and lifecycle management services.

== History ==
=== Early years and expansion of main business ===
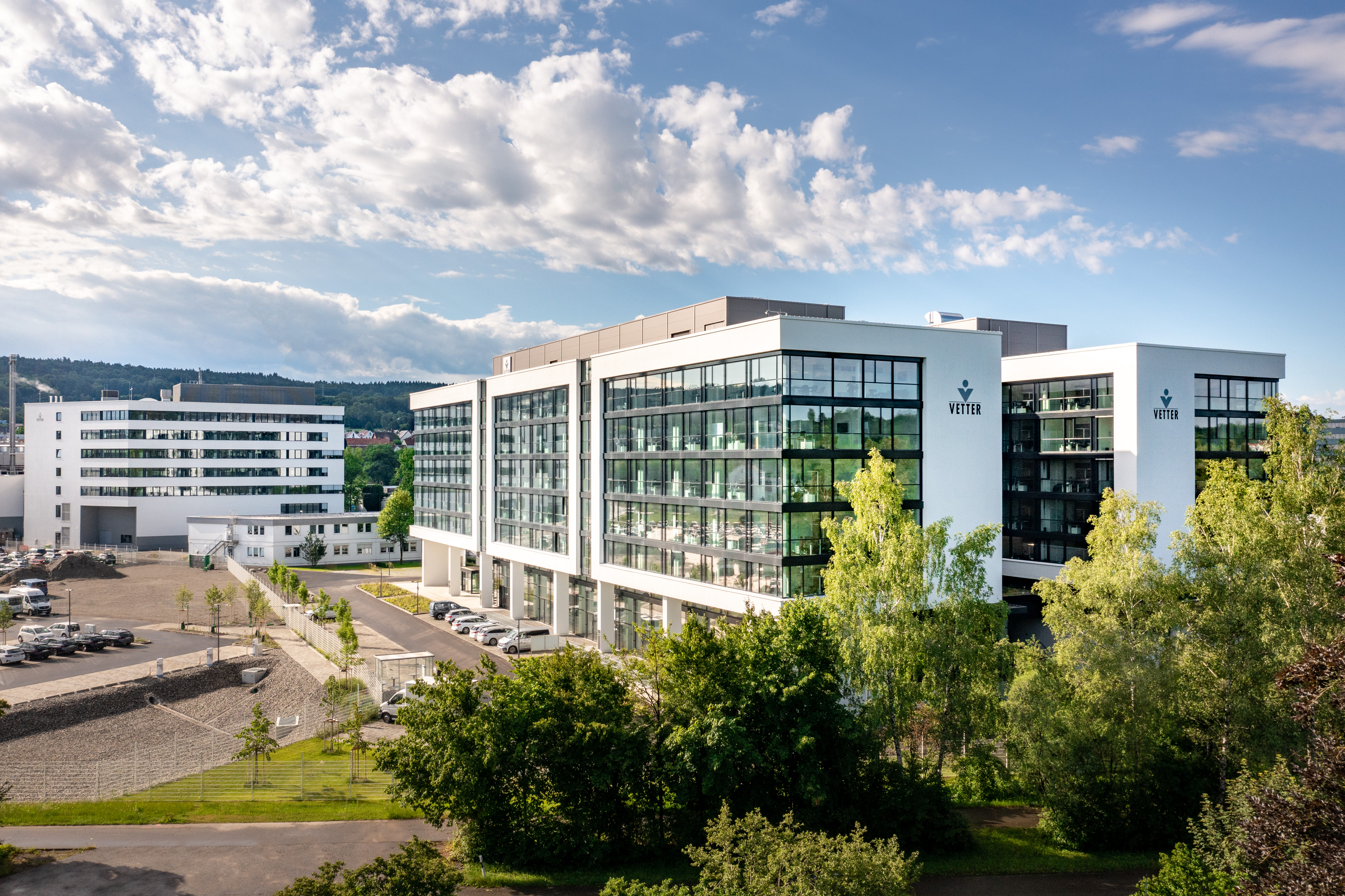
Headquarters at production site (2022)

The company was founded in 1950 by pharmacist Helmut Vetter (1920–1999) as "Apotheker Vetter & Co. Arzneimittel GmbH Ravensburg". Initially, the company manufactured mainly wafer capsules, specifically their stomachic "Ullus capsules". One year after its foundation, the company moved to the centre of Ravensburg. In 1958, Helmut Vetter opened a pharmacy ("Apotheke Vetter am Marienplatz"), including a perfumery and Reformhaus. During this time, Vetter began to look into airtight and watertight sealing for the medicines which he produced in his pharmacy.

From 1965, the company began contract manufacturing of solid and liquid medicines, including their packaging, such as contact lens solutions. Since 1975, aseptically prefilled syringes were increasingly produced and since the end of the 1980s, aseptic filling has been the company's main business.

=== Entry into the U.S. market ===
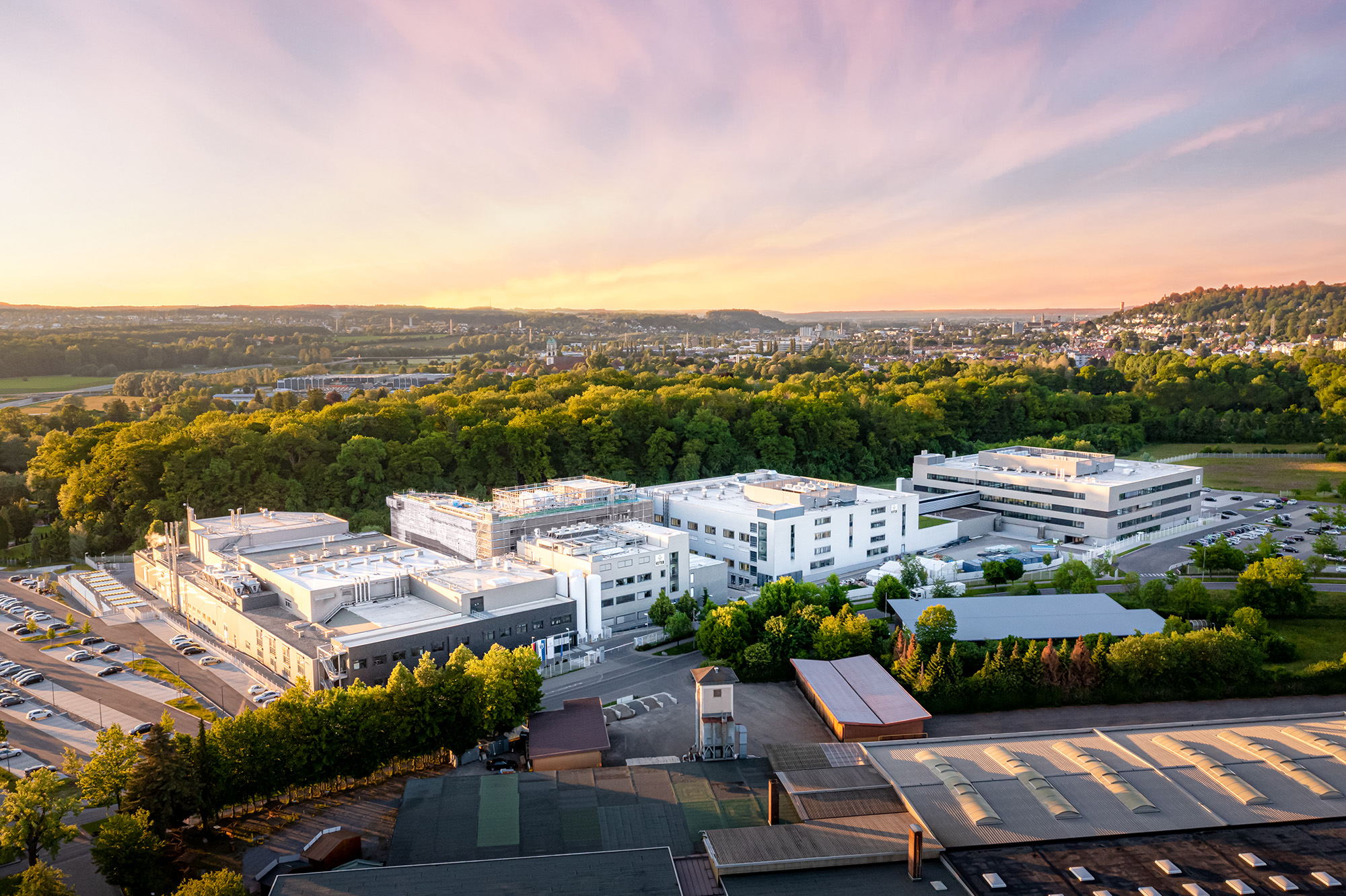
Production site Ravensburg South Mariatal (2022)

Vetter founded its first foreign subsidiary in the United States in 1983, "Vetter Pharma Turm Inc." (Yardley, Pennsylvania), to handle sales in the United States and Canada. The following year, the company was renamed "Vetter Pharma-Fertigung GmbH & Co. KG". In 1987, Udo Vetter took over management positions in the company.

In 1988, the U.S. Food and Drug Administration (FDA) granted Vetter's Ravensburg facility approval to operate, which opened the U.S. market. At that point, the pharmaceutical service provider employed around 350 people. Two years later, the company launched a dual-chamber syringe, which contains freeze-dried and thus long-lasting drugs in one chamber and a suitable solvent in the second chamber. The components are mixed during application.

=== Automation and global expansion ===
Over the following years, production was largely automated. A second German production facility was established in Langenargen in 1996, which also received FDA approval in 1998. In 2004, a second plant in Ravensburg-South (Mariatal industrial estate) started construction. The production facility was completed at the end of 2006 and received manufacturing approval from the Tübingen Regional Council in early 2007, followed by FDA approval one year later. At the end of 2007, Vetter began construction of a new plant for final packaging at the Ravensburg site, which was fully commissioned in May 2009.

Also in 2009, the company founded its sales subsidiary "Vetter Pharma International GmbH", and named its U.S. sales subsidiary "Vetter Pharma International USA Inc". In 2011, production began at the first U.S. clinical manufacturing facility in Chicago. Vetter entered the Asian market in 2014 with a sales office in Singapore. A year later, a branch office was opened in Tokyo, Japan, and another office in South Korea in 2018.

In 2017, Vetter laid the foundation for a new administration building at its Ravensburg Schuetzenstrasse site. In 2018 the demand for development projects within the early clinical phases grew and the U.S. site in Skokie, Chicago, was expanded from 3,500 square meters to approximately 4,700 square meters with additional extensions to the site in 2019.

In 2020, Vetter began a strategic collaboration with the family-run biotech company Rentschler Biopharma SE. In the same year, the company moved into new headquarters at its Ravensburg site.

In March 2021, Vetter opened a branch office in Shanghai, China. After Singapore, Japan, and South Korea, this represented the company's fourth branch office in the Asia-Pacific region. By September of the same year, all German, Austrian, U.S., and Asian production sites and sales offices were climate neutral. At the end of 2021, Vetter received operating approval for a new clinical manufacturing facility in Rankweil, Austria, following an inspection by the Austrian Agency for Health and Food Safety (AGES).

In March 2023, Vetter joined the United Nations Global Compact (UNGC), the world's largest corporate initiative for sustainable business practices. In 2023, the production capacities and range of services at the Rankweil site were expanded.

In early 2024, Vetter became a member of the Verband Forschender Arzneimittelhersteller due to its pharmaceutical services in the area of complex injectable drugs. In June 2024, Vetter announced plans for capacity expansions at its Ravensburg and Langenargen plants, as well as for a new site in Saarlouis. The Saarlouis location will focus on the commercial production of approved drugs and employ around 2,000 people. At the same time, it was announced that the company's U.S. development location would be relocated from Skokie, Illinois, to the nearby Des Plaines.

On November 18, 2024, Vetter opened an educational centre with a scientific training centre in Ravensburg, where the company trains pharmaceutical and lab technicians. It operates in addition to a technical training centre in Ravensburg that has been in operation since 2020.

As reported by Schwäbische Zeitung in August 2025, the company's US development site is relocating from Skokie to Des Plaines. Vetter invests around €250 million in a new clinical production facility there. Construction work began in late June 2025. At the end of 2025, managing director Thomas Otto retired from the company.

According to the Saarländischer Rundfunk, construction work for a new Vetter site in Saarlouis began on May 13, 2026. According to the broadcaster, Vetter plans to create 2,000 jobs.

== Corporate Structure ==
In the 2025 financial year, the company generated a revenue of €1,259 billion and employed 6,327 employees. As of 2023, the company generates more than half of its sales in the U.S. Vetter's managing directors are Henryk Badack, Titus Ottinger and Carsten Press. In addition to the Vetter management team, an independent advisory board chaired by Udo J. Vetter also assists the company.

Vetter has locations nationally and internationally. In Ravensburg and Langenargen, the company operates a total of three production facilities for manufacturing and final packaging. In the U.S. and Austria, small quantities of active ingredients are filled for clinical test series. Further sites are located in the Asia-Pacific region with sales subsidiaries in China, Singapore, Japan, and South Korea.

== Products ==
Vetter develops, manufactures and packages injectable drugs. The company sterilely fills active ingredients into syringes and other injection systems, for example, ingredients for diseases such as rheumatism, Crohn's disease or rare diseases such as Alzheimer's in children.

== Importance for the U.S. ==
In the United States, Vetter is listed at Critical Foreign Dependencies Initiative (CFDI), a strategy and list maintained by the United States Department of Homeland Security of foreign infrastructure, which, if attacked or destroyed, would critically impact the U.S.

== Awards ==
In 2022, Vetter won the Sustainable Impact Award in the category "Social Impact on Employees", which relates to employee satisfaction. The award is presented by the magazine Wirtschaftswoche, the Bundesverband mittelständische Wirtschaft and Generali Deutschland. In 2023, the Sustainable Impact Award was won for the second time, this time in the "Impact of Social Engagement" category.

In 2023, Vetter received the German Federal Ministry for the Environment's Environmental Management Award. Furthermore, in 2023, Vetter Pharma received Platinum status in the EcoVadis sustainability rating. In 2024, Vetter received the Best Managed Companies Award for the fifth consecutive time for outstanding corporate management, awarded by Deloitte, Frankfurter Allgemeine Zeitung, the Federation of German Industries (BDI), and UBS.
