= Atlantic Crossing 1 =

AC-1
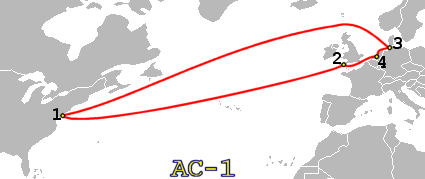
- Owners: Tyco / Level 3 Communications
- Landing points: 1. (United States) Shirley, New York (Brookhaven Cable Stn.); 2. (United Kingdom) Whitesand Bay, Cornwall, England (Land's End Cable Stn.); 3. (Germany) Westerland, Schleswig-Holstein; 4. (Netherlands) Beverwijk (KPN Telecom Cable Stn.)
- Total length: 14,000 km
- Topology: unknown
- Currently lit capacity: 4600 Gbit/s
- Technology: Fiber optics
- Date of first use: 1999

Atlantic Crossing 1 (AC-1) is an optical submarine telecommunications cable system linking the United States and three European countries.

It transports speech and data traffic between the U.S., the U.K., the Netherlands and Germany. It is one of several transatlantic communications cables. It was operated by American company Level 3 Communications and Irish company Tyco International, until their respective mergers in 2017 and 2016 with other companies.

It has landing points in:

1. Brookhaven Cable Station, Shirley, New York, United States
2. Land's End Cable Station, Cornwall, England, United Kingdom
3. Westerland Cable Station, Schleswig-Holstein, Germany
4. KPN Telecom cable station, Beverwijk, Netherlands

== Upgrades and renewal ==
During its lifetime, the design capacity of AC-1 has been upgraded over 100 times. As of 2025, the capacity of the southern path between Shirley and Cornwall, England has a design capacity of 5600 Gbps and operates at 4600 Gbps. The northern path between Brookhaven and Sylt, Germany has a design capacity of 4000 Gbps with 260 Gbps in use.

In 2025, the US FCC approved a 25-year renewal of the AC-1 cable landing license, extending its license to 2048.
