= Minerva (cable system) =

MINERVA is a submarine telecommunications cable system connecting Italy with Cyprus.

It has cable landing points at:

- Mazara del Vallo, Province of Trapani, Sicily, Italy
- Catania, Province of Catania, Sicily, Italy
- Yeroskipou/Geroskipou (Greek: Γεροσκήπου), Paphos District, Cyprus
- Pentaskhinos, Cyprus

Pentaskhinos connects to Catania by adding a submarine branching unit and a new segment to the existing MedNautilus system, and Yeroskipou connects to Mazara del Vallo by upgrading the relevant part of the LEV cable system.

The Minerva Subsystem is operated and managed by MedNautilus, a wholly owned subsidiary of Telecom Italia Sparkle
