= Cypriot cuisine =

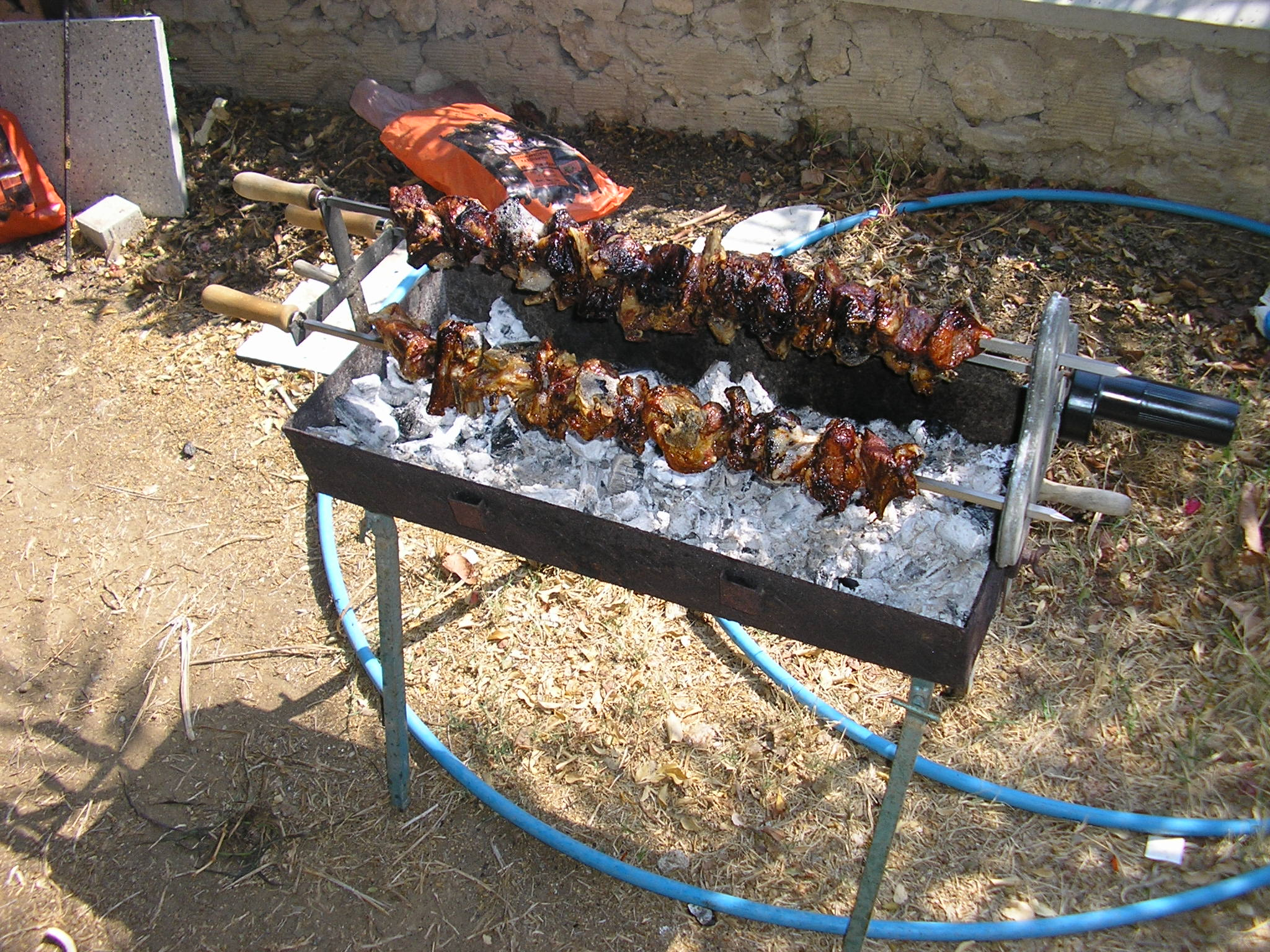
Souvla, a Cypriot grill to roast skewers of lamb, kid, or chicken

Cypriot cuisine is the cuisine of the island of Cyprus. The cuisine of Cyprus is heavily influenced by neighboring countries like Turkey and Greece. It also has Mediterranean influences because of its position in the Mediterranean Sea, including from countries in the Levant. Halloumi, a staple of the cuisine, traces its name to Arabic.

== Food preparation ==
Frequently used ingredients are fresh vegetables such as courgettes (zucchini), olives, okra, green beans, artichokes, carrots, tomatoes, cucumbers, lettuce and grape leaves, and pulses such as beans (for fasolada), broad beans, peas, black-eyed beans, chickpeas and lentils. Pears, apples, grapes, oranges, mandarin oranges, nectarines, mespila, blackberries, cherries, strawberries, figs, watermelon, melon, avocado, citrus, lemon, pistachio, almond, chestnut, walnut, and hazelnut are some of the most common fruits and nuts.

The best-known spices and herbs include pepper, parsley, rocket (arugula), celery, fresh coriander (cilantro), thyme, and oregano. Traditionally, cumin and coriander seeds make up the main cooking aromas of the island. Mint grows abundantly, and is used in many dishes, particularly those containing ground meat. For example, the Cypriot version of pastitsio (locally known as macaronia tou fournou or fırında makarna) contains very little tomato and large amounts of mint. The same is true of keftedes or köfte (meatballs), which are sometimes laced with mint to contrast with the meat. Potato is also often used in making keftedes. Coriander or cilantro is another commonly used herb, included in salads, olive breads, spinach pies (spanakopita or ispanak böreği) and other pastries. In some regions of the island it is also used to flavour hot dishes, particularly tomato-based ones such as yiachnista.

Meats grilled over charcoal are known as souvla, souvlaki or şiş, named after the skewers on which they are prepared. Most commonly these are pork, kid, beef, lamb or chicken and sheftalia (which can be lamb or pork sausage wrapped in caul fat), grilled halloumi cheese, mushrooms, and, uniquely to the Greek Cypriots, loukaniko (pork sausages) are also served. These typically stuffed into a pita or wrapped in a thin flatbread, along with a salad of cabbage, parsley, thinly sliced onions, tomatoes and sliced cucumber. Although less popular than souvlaki and sheftalia, gyros are also commonly eaten. Gyros (also known as döner) have grilled meat slices instead of chunks, and the taste differs from that of souvlaki due to the salad and dressings added. Gyros are made from various cuts of lamb, pork, or chicken, and sometimes but rarely beef.

Bulgur is the traditional carbohydrate other than bread. It is often steamed with tomato and onion; a few strands of vermicelli pasta are often added to provide a texture, fragrance, colour and flavour contrast. Along with bulgur, natural yogurt is a staple. Wheat and yogurt come together in the traditional peasant meal of tarhana (or trahanas), a way of preserving milk in which the cracked wheat is steamed, mixed with sour milk, dried, and stored. Small amounts are eaten reheated in water or broth, sometimes with the addition of cubed aged halloumi. Bulgur is also used to make koupes or içli/bulgur köfte, the Cypriot form of kibbeh, where the bulgur is mixed with flour and water to form a dough, which is formed into a cigar shape. A hollow is made through the cigar and a mixture of minced meat, onions, parsley and cinnamon is packed. After the meat mixture is sealed inside the cigars, they are deep-fried before being served with lemon juice.

For Greek Cypriots, there are many fasting days defined by the Orthodox Church, and though not everyone adheres, many do. On these days, effectively all animal products must not be consumed. Pulses are eaten instead, sometimes cooked in tomato sauce, but more usually simply prepared and dressed with olive oil and lemon. On some days, even olive oil is not allowed. These meals often consist of raw onion, raw garlic, and dried red chili which is eaten along with these austere dishes to add a variety of taste, though this practice is dying out.

== Dishes ==
=== Seafood ===
Common seafood dishes include calamari, octopus, cuttlefish, red mullet, sea bass, and gilt-head bream. Octopus is made into a stiffado, a stew with red wine, carrots, tomatoes, and onions. Calamari is either cut into rings and fried in batter or is stuffed whole with rice, cumin, and cloves, with mint sometimes added to the stuffing, and then baked or grilled. Cuttlefish may be cooked like calamari or like octopus in red wine with onions. It is sometimes prepared with spinach, but without adding garden peas, which are a common accompaniment for cuttlefish in Turkey (especially on the west and south coasts), some parts of Greece, and Italy. Calamari, octopus, and cuttlefish commonly feature in meze, a spread of small dishes served as an extensive set of entrées.

The most traditional fish is salt cod, which up until very recently was baked in outdoor beehive ovens with potatoes and tomatoes in season. Gilt-head bream is commonly served because it is relatively inexpensive and, like sea bass, extensively farmed. Until recently, salted herrings bought whole out of wooden barrels were a staple food. They are still eaten, but not as much now, as fresh fish and meat are regular alternatives.

Many fish restaurants also include in the fish meze a variety of foods which include fish, such as fish soufflé and fish croquettes.

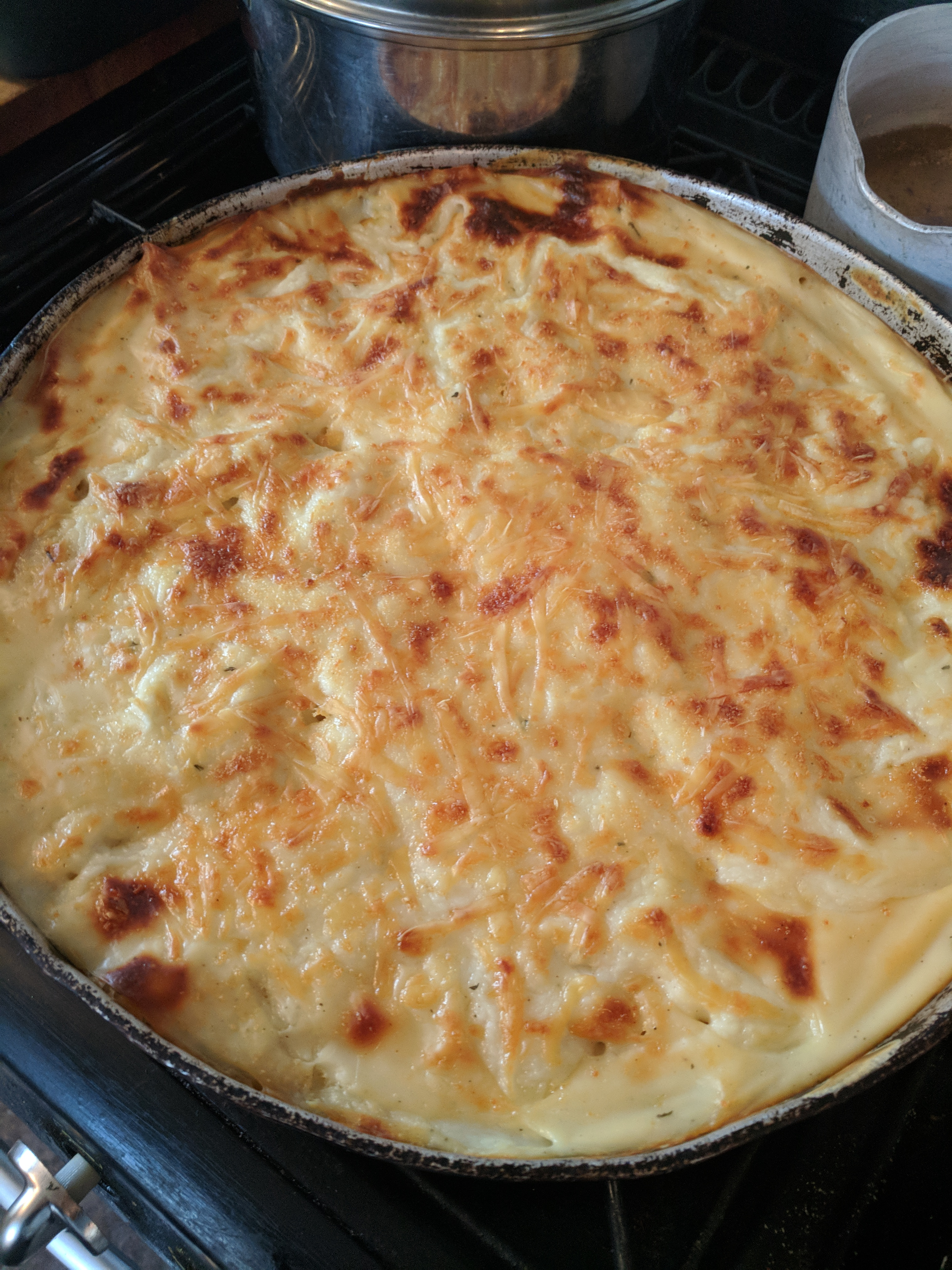
Makarónia tou foúrnou or fırında makarna: pasta cooked in the oven with white sauce and minced meat

=== Vegetables ===
Cyprus potatoes are long and waxy with a unique taste, exported internationally. Locals bake them in the oven, preferably the outdoor beehive fourni. Many Cypriots add salt, cumin, oregano, and some finely sliced onion. When they barbecue, some Cypriots put potatoes into foil and set them in the charcoal to make them like jacket potatoes, served with butter or as a side dish to salad and meat.

Salad vegetables are eaten at every meal, sometimes whole. More often, they are chopped, sliced, and dressed with lemon and olive oil. In the summer, the usual salad is of celery leaves and stalks, parsley, coriander leaves, tomatoes, and cucumbers. Summer purslane is often served, as are wild dandelion leaves.

In early spring, artichokes are in season. Cypriots eat the leaves by detaching and biting off the fleshy base. The stalks and the heart are commonly braised with garden peas, sometimes with onion, chopped tomato, or meat.

Okra and cauliflower are baked in the oven with tomato and oil. Cauliflower is also made into moungra, a sour pickle covered with a marinade of vinegar, yeast, and mustard seeds. It is also cooked in tomato sauce with onions and minced meat.

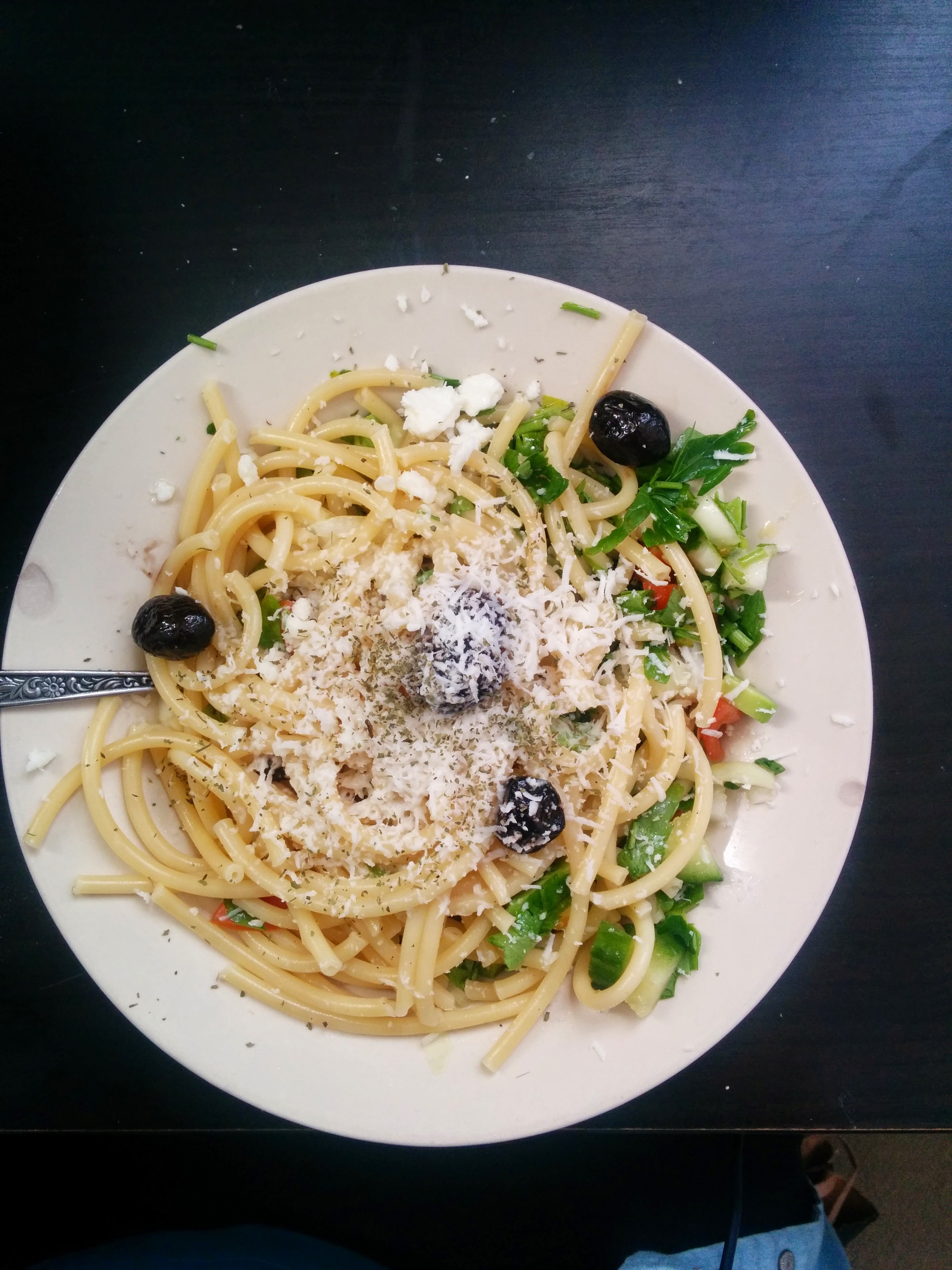
Magarina bulli served with salad and olives

Aubergines can be prepared in a variety of ways, including stuffed and in moussaka. They are commonly fried and stewed slowly in oil, where the cooking time brings out the flavour and also allows them to shed the oil they have absorbed. Turkish Cypriots hollow them, fry them, stuff them with tomatoes and garlic or minced meat and tomato paste, cook them in the oven and garnish them with parsley.

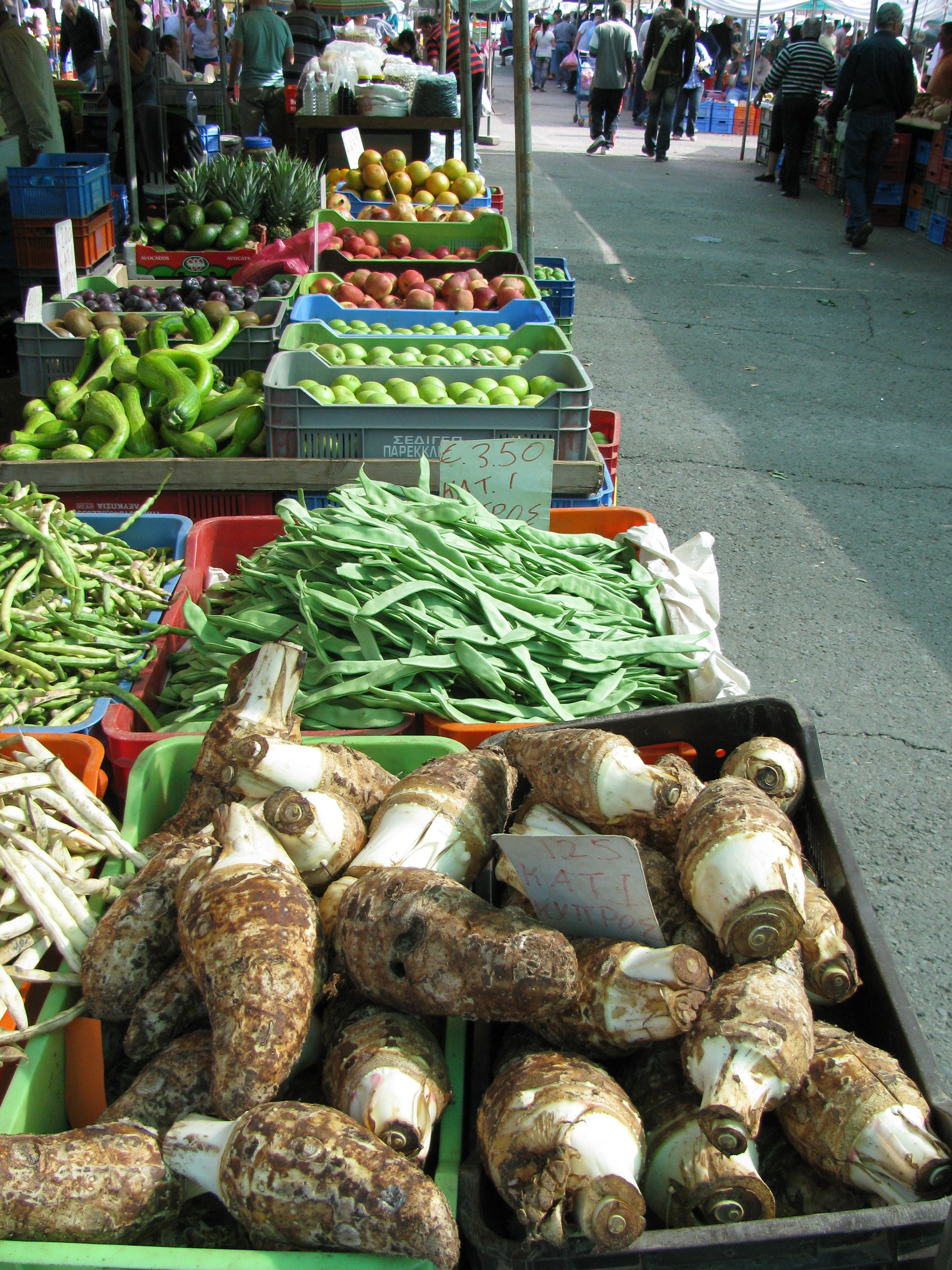
Wednesday vegetable market in Nicosia; the root vegetable in the foreground is kolokasi.

=== Pasta ===
Makarónia tou foúrnou (Greek: μακαρόνια του φούρνου, Turkish: fırında makarna, English: oven macaroni) recipes vary, but usually the meat sauce in the middle is made of pork, beef or lamb, tomatoes are only sometimes used, and it is flavoured with mint, parsley or cinnamon. The top is sprinkled with grated halloumi or anari cheese, though cheese is sometimes added only to the white sauce. The traditional pasta shape for this dish is bucatini. This dish is also referred to as pastitsio.

Magarına bulli is a traditional Cypriot meal made of bucatini pasta and chicken. This dish is widely known as one of the national dishes of Cyprus. Chicken is often boiled in water which is then used as the stock to cook the pasta. When the pasta and chicken are cooked, the pasta is often topped with lemon juice, grated halloumi cheese and dried mint.

=== Meat ===
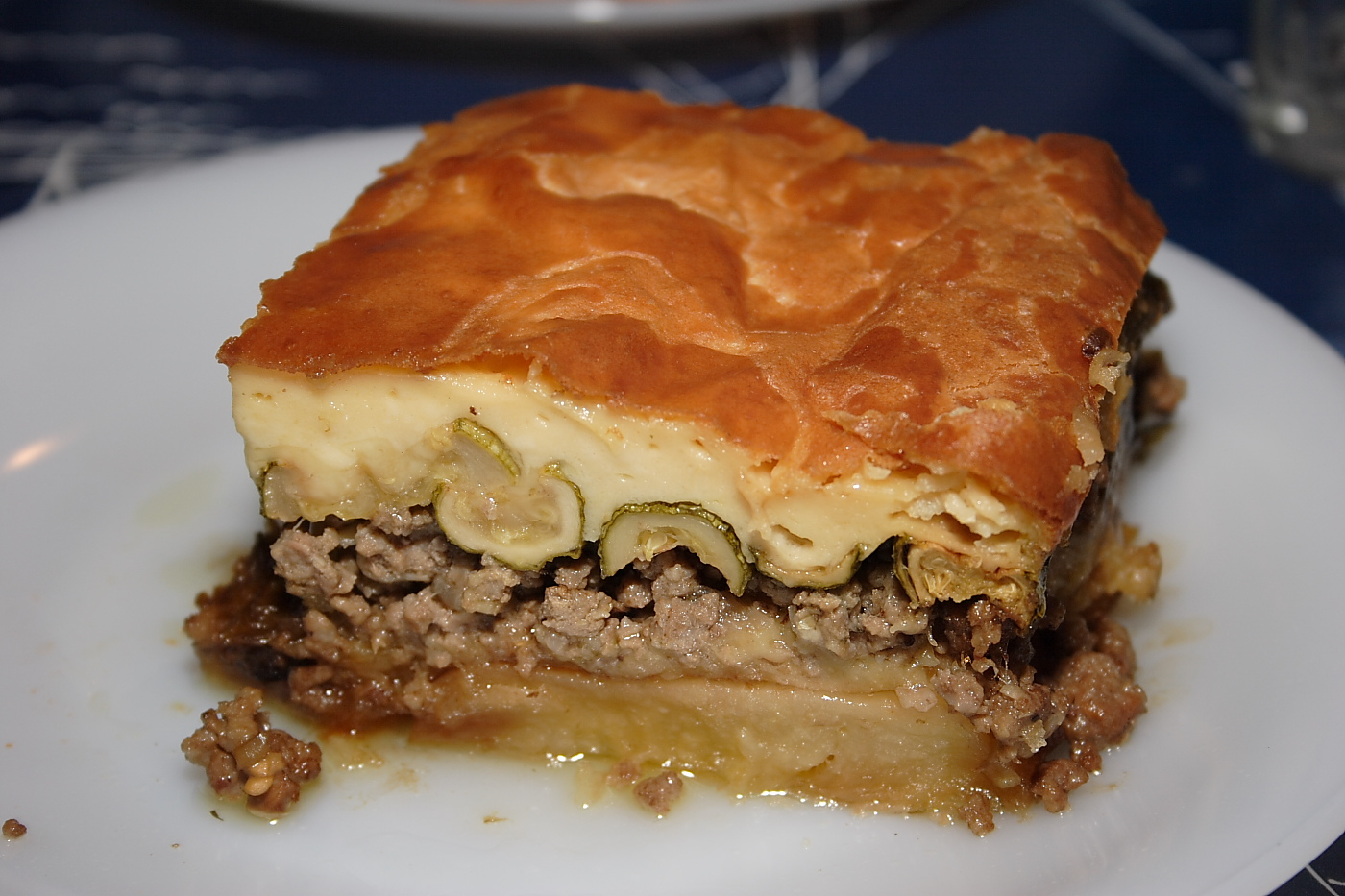
Moussaka

Prior to Cyprus' urbanisation, Cypriots traditionally ate fresh meat on weekends. This was usually a boiled chicken, served with a starch (usually pasta or bulgur) cooked in its juices. This would stretch the meat to enable the whole family to eat. Other fresh meat dishes were only enjoyed occasionally, sometimes en masse as a feast such as a wedding. Now, as people are better off and meat is widely available, traditional meat dishes are enjoyed frequently.

Afelia, when well prepared, is a saute of pork, red wine, and coriander seeds. Psito is large chunks of meat and potatoes cooked in the oven. Plenty of fat is used in its preparation; traditionally, this would have been rendered pig fat, but now sunflower oil is used. Olive oil is used as a dressing for salads, vegetables, and pulses but is not used to cook meat dishes.

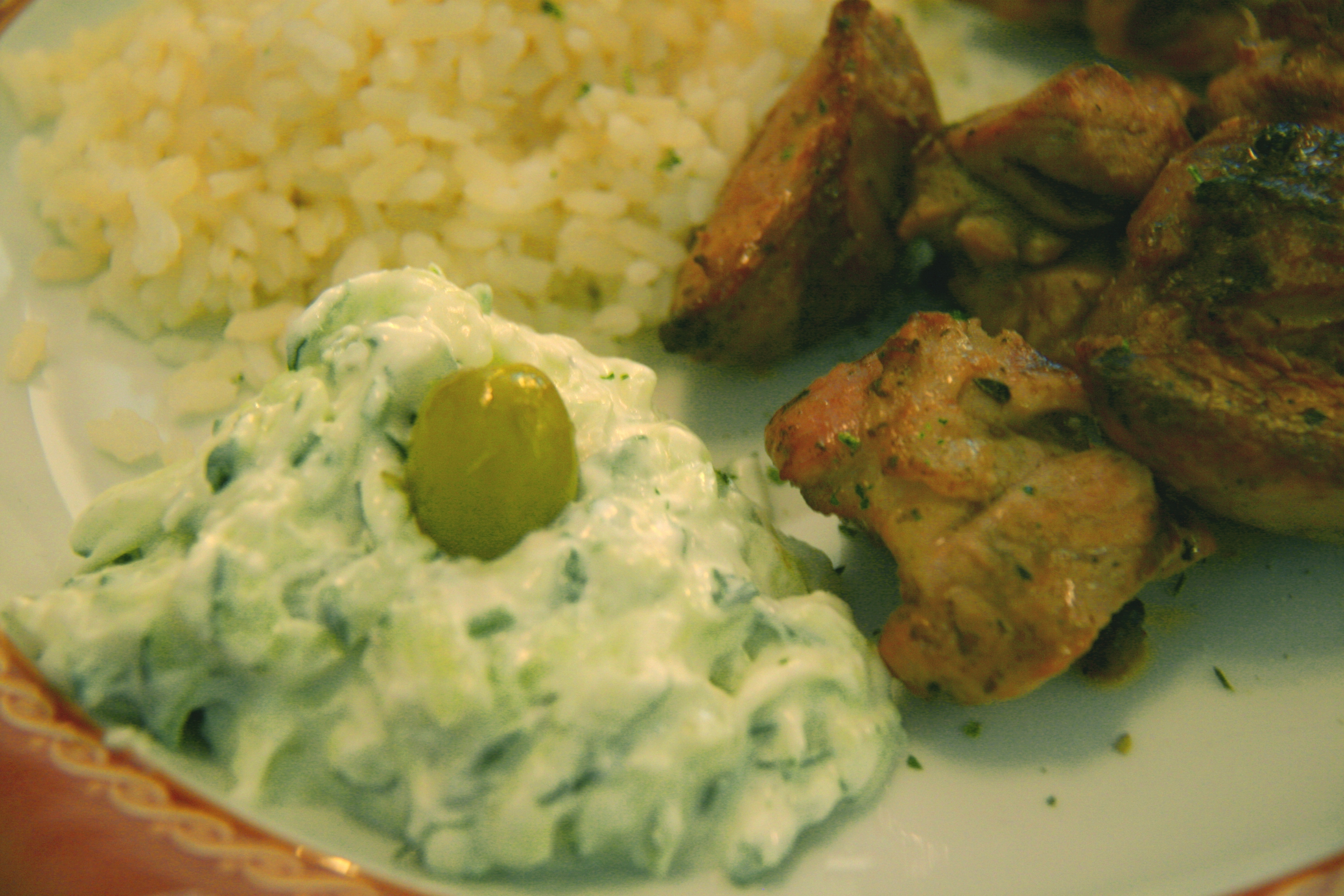
Souvlaki with tzatziki sauce and rice.

Preserved pork is very popular, and before refrigeration, it was the main source of red meat available to Cypriots. Before refrigeration became widespread in the 19th century it was tradition to throw away the preserved pork in summertime. Cypriots also add red wine; therefore, there is a characteristic flavour to most of the charcuterie from the island.

Lountza is made from the pork tenderloin. After the initial brining and marinading in wine, it is smoked. Although it can be aged, many prefer younger, milder lountza. It is often cooked over coals or fried with eggs to act as a sandwich filler or as part of a meze. Stronger than lountza and made from the leg, is chiromeri, which is similar to any smoked, air-dried ham from Southern Europe, although the wine flavour makes it characteristically Cypriot. In non-mountain areas, the same meat used for chiromeri is cut into strips along the muscle compartments and dried in the sun as basta. The shoulder of a freshly slaughtered animal is cut into chunks about the size of an almond along with a smaller quantity of chopped back fat, which are marinated in wine and brined, stuffed into intestines, and smoked as sausages (loukaniko).

A traditional practice that is dying out fast is to render pig fat for use as a cooking medium and a preservative. Loukaniko and also chunks of fried salted pork meat and fat can be stored in earthenware jars submerged in the lard for a long time, even in the heat of the island.

Lamb and goat meat is also preserved as tsamarella, made very salty to prevent the fatty lamb meat from going rancid. Very popular amongst both communities is preserved beef. The whole silversides and briskets are salted and spiced quite powerfully to make pastourma/bastirma. The Cypriot version of bastirma is more similar to Sujuk. The same meat and some fat is chopped finely and made into pastourma-loukaniko sausages.

Sheftalia, sometimes referred to as a kebab, is a lamb/pork sausage with parsley and onions, and is wrapped in caul fat and grilled/fried.

Many Cypriots consider snails a delicacy. Snails are in season in late autumn, when the first good rains arrive after the hot summer. The most popular way to prepare snails is to barbecue them. Another popular variation is to cook them with onions, garlic and tomatoes.

=== Meze ===
Mezedes is a large selection of dishes with small helpings of varied foods, brought to the table as a progression of tastes and textures. The meal begins with black and green olives, tahini, skordalia (potato and garlic dip), humus, taramosalata (fish roe dip), and tzatziki / cacık (ttalattouri in Cypriot), all served with chunks of fresh bread and a bowl of mixed salad. Some of the more unusual meze dishes include octopus in red wine, snails in tomato sauce, brains with pickled capers, samarella (salted dried meat), quails, pickled quail eggs, tongue, kappari pickles (capers), and moungra (pickled cauliflower). Bunches of greens, some raw, some dressed with lemon juice and salt, are a basic feature of the meze table. The meal continues with fish, grilled halloumi cheese, lountza (smoked pork tenderloin), keftedes (minced meatballs), sheftalia (pork rissoles), and loukaniko (pork sausages). Hot grilled meats – kebabs, lamb chops, chicken – may be served toward the end. The dessert is usually fresh fruit or glyka – traditional sugar-preserved fruits and nuts.

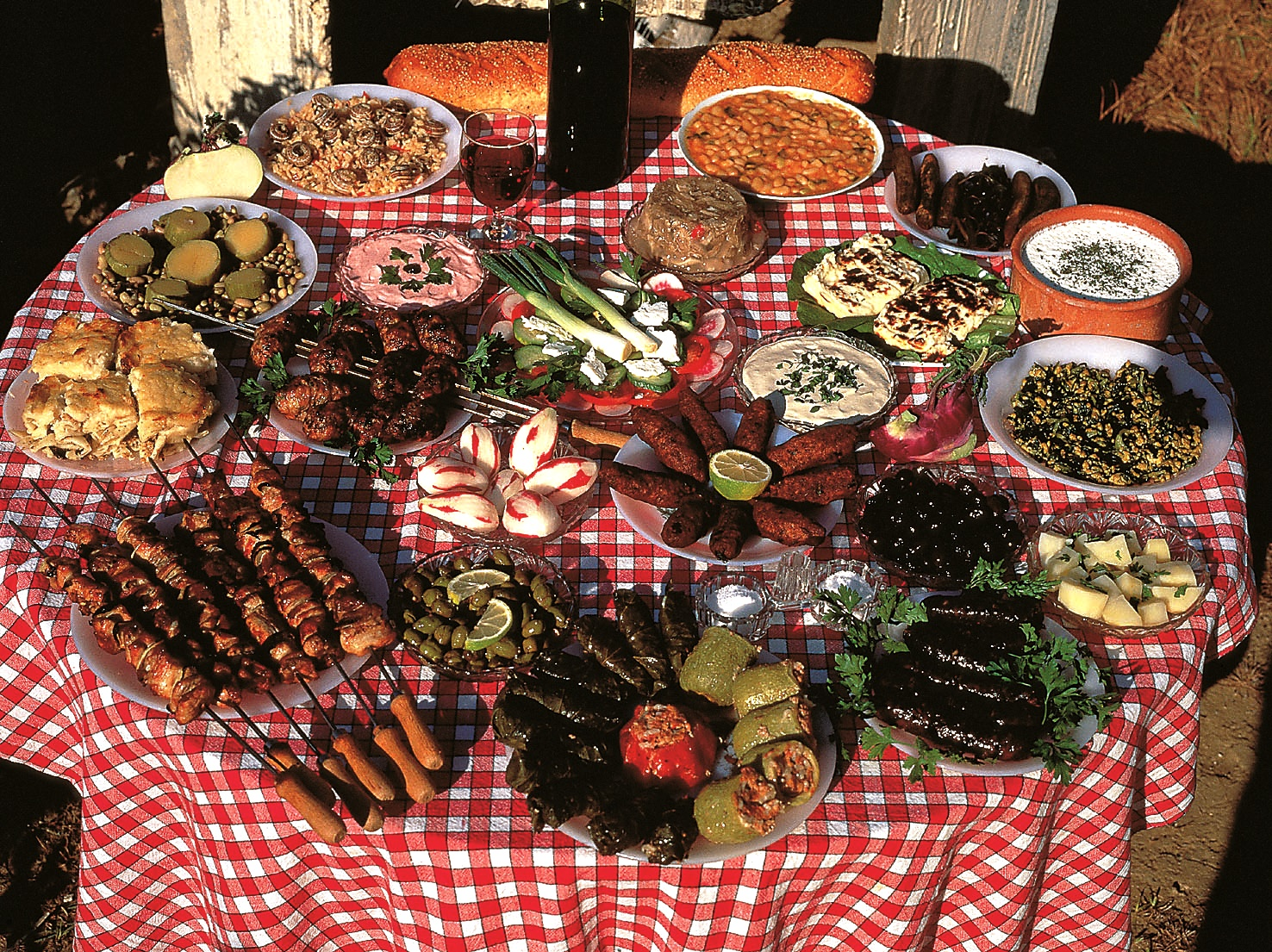
Cypriot meze

=== Desserts ===
Loukoumades (fried doughballs in syrup), loukoum, ravani (sweet semolina citrus cake), tulumba and baklava are well-known local desserts. There are also pastiș, cookies made of ground almonds, that are offered to guests at weddings.

Flaounes are savoury Easter pastries that contain goats cheese (or a variety of cheeses), eggs, spices and herbs all wrapped in a yeast pastry, then brushed with egg yolk and dipped into sesame seeds.

Cypriots also make many traditional spoon sweets that are usually made of turunch/bergamot, figs, tiny aubergines, fresh fleshy walnuts, watermelon or pumpkins processed akin to jam but without the over-cooking. The fruit is soaked for two weeks (depending upon the fruit) then boiled with sugar until the correct texture is obtained.

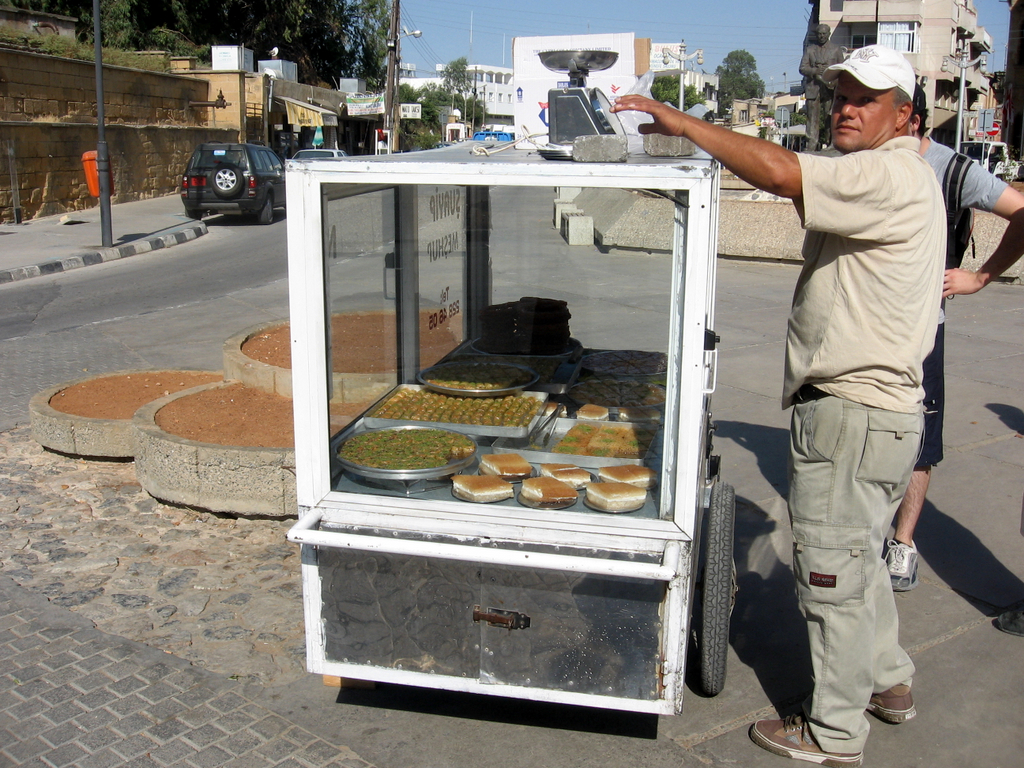
Turkish Cypriot man selling baklava in Nicosia/Lefkoşa.

Sweet syrups and spreads include soumada made from almonds. Soumada has a very ancient history in Cyprus, stretching back into the Roman period, and it was given as an exotic eastern delicacy by King Peter I of Cyprus to King Casimir the Great of Poland at the Congress of Kraków, held in Poland in 1364. Also popular is mahalepi, a kind of blancmange made from corn flour usually flavoured with rose water or mahlep.

Cyprus delights, or loukoumia, are one of Cyprus's protected geographical indication (PGI) by the European Union. It is a family of confections based on a gel of starch and sugar, flavored with lemon, rose water, mastic or other fruits with or without chopped dates, pistachios and hazelnuts or walnuts bound by the gel. The main centres for its production are Yeroskipou near Paphos and Pano Lefkara near Larnaca. A similar looking sweet is soujouk or shoushouko, although it is made very differently from loukoumia, being produced from boiled grape juice.

== Cheeses ==
Halloumi is a semi-hard white-brined cheese with elastic texture, made in a rectangular shape from a mixture of goat and sheep milk; it may be sliced and eaten fresh, grilled, or fried. Aged halloumi may be grated over pasta dishes. It is the national cheese of Cyprus.

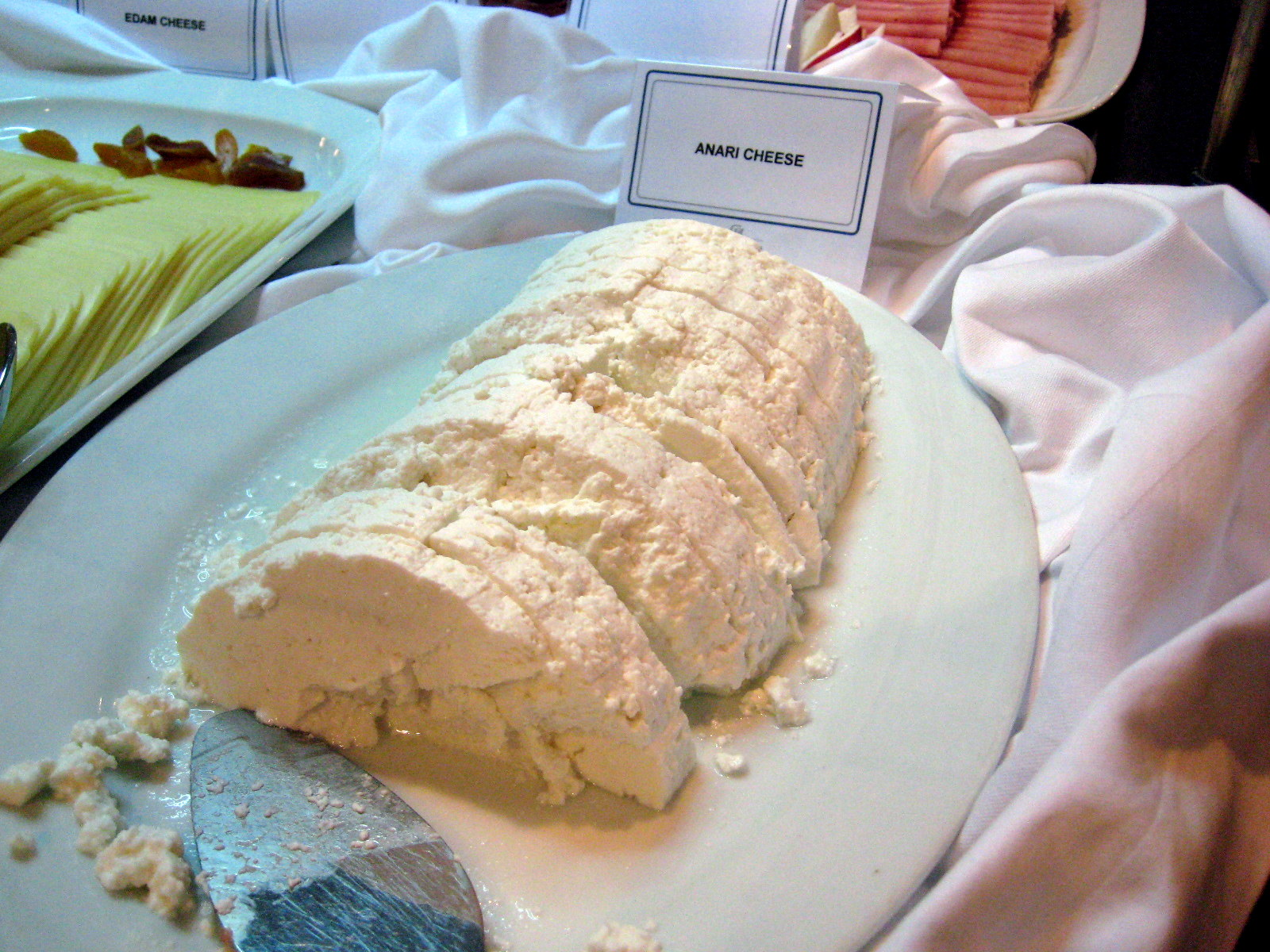
Anari cheese served for breakfast at a Limassol hotel

Anari is a crumbly fresh whey cheese, similar to ricotta, made from goat or sheep milk. Two varieties exist, dry and fresh anari. Dry anari is salted and is much harder than the fresh variety, and is served grated with pasta dishes and giouvetsi, while fresh anari is eaten in slices with honey or carob syrup.

Halitzia is a feta-like cheese made from goat or sheep milk. It is a slightly sour-flavored cheese, which is produced in the villages of the area of Tylliria. It can be enjoyed in salads.

== Drinks ==
=== Non-alcoholic ===
Ayran is a traditional drink made of yoghurt. Its recipe varies from region to region. Triantafyllo, a thick concentrated dark pink syrup (rose cordial) made from the extract of the Cyprus (Damascus) rose, has water or milk added to make a refreshing sweet cordial, especially in summer. It is distinct from rodostagma (literally "rose drops") (rose water) and anthonero (blossom water), which are used to sweeten mahallepi and other sweetmeats.

=== Alcoholic ===
Among Cypriots traditional brandy and zivania are of the most popular drinks on the island. The next most popular drink is beer. The local breweries of KEO and Carlsberg command the lion's share of the market. In Northern Cyprus, Efes is the most widely sold. Evidence of wine production on Cyprus goes back for millennia. Commandaria, the oldest wine in continuous production, is a popular dessert wine.

Cyprus brandy production is by various Limassol-based distilleries since 1871. Cypriot brandy is commonly drunk with meze dishes, and forms the base for the distinctive brandy sour cocktail, developed on the island in the late 1930s. Zivania, a grape distillate similar to Cretan raki, is another popular spirit.

== Gallery ==
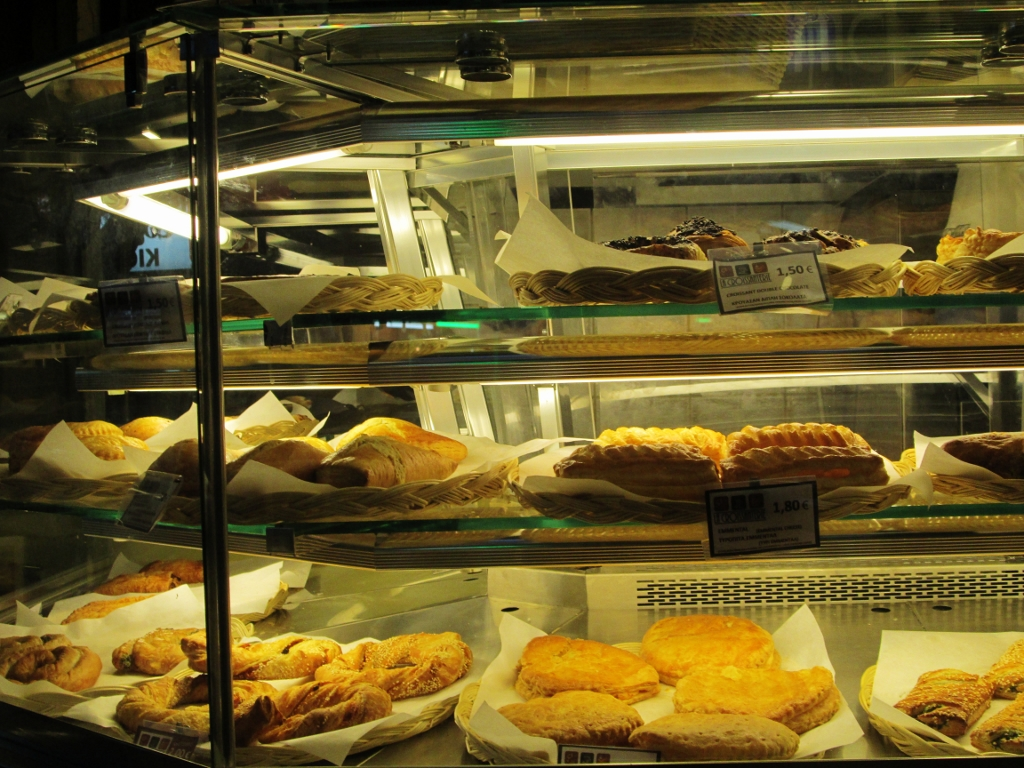
Typical bakery in Onasagorou Street

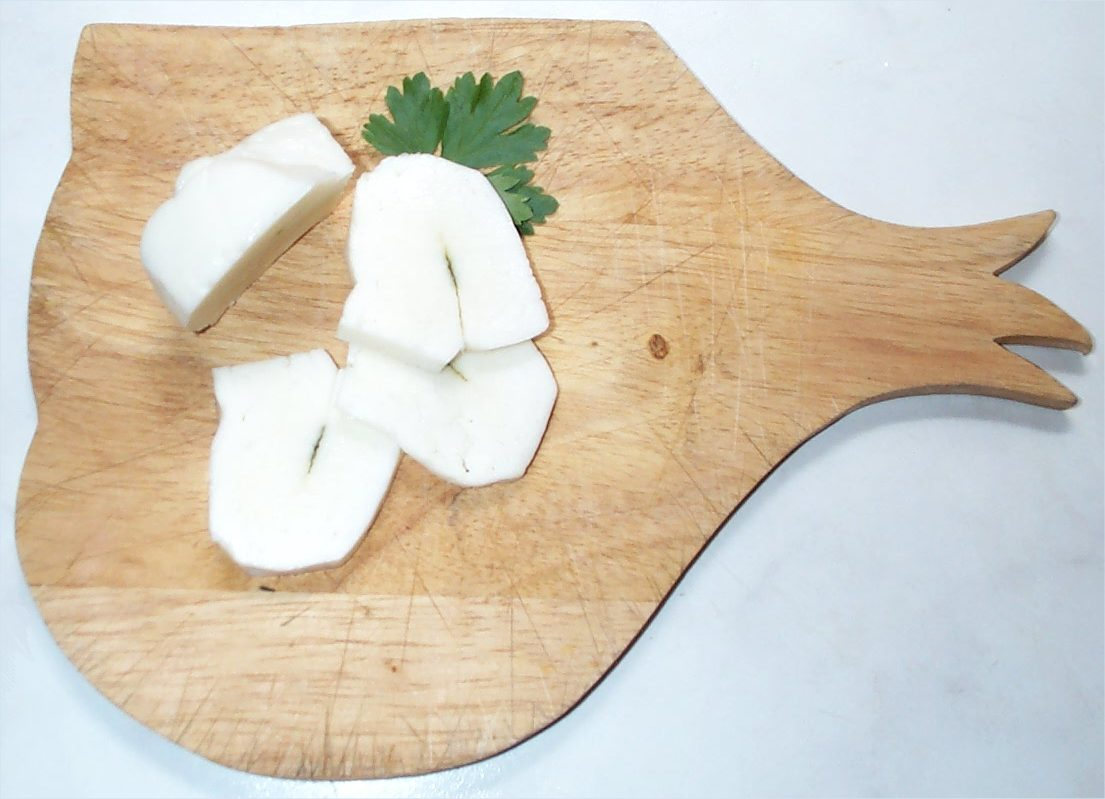
Halloumi cheese

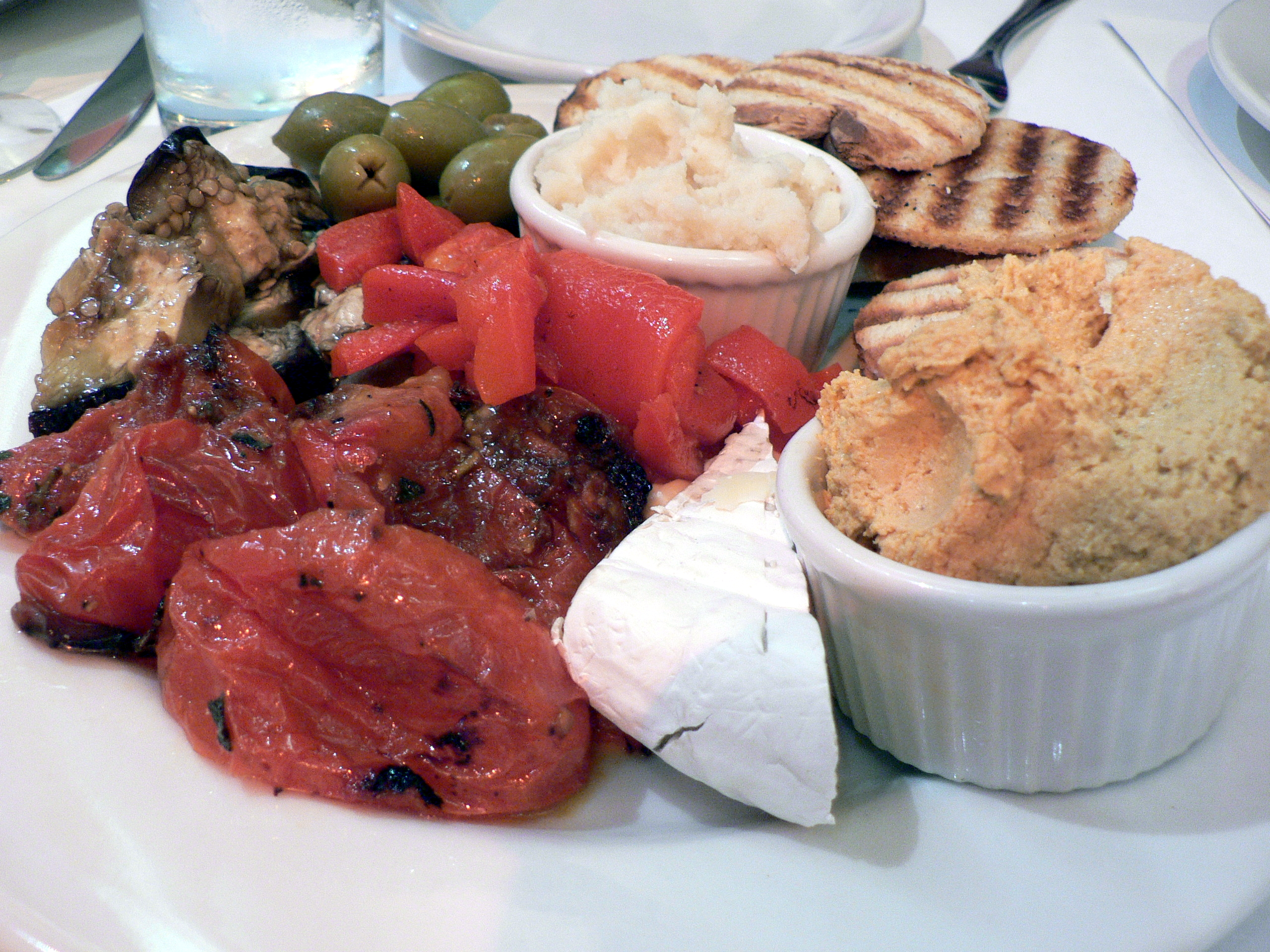
Skordalia sauce, hummus and grilled vegetables

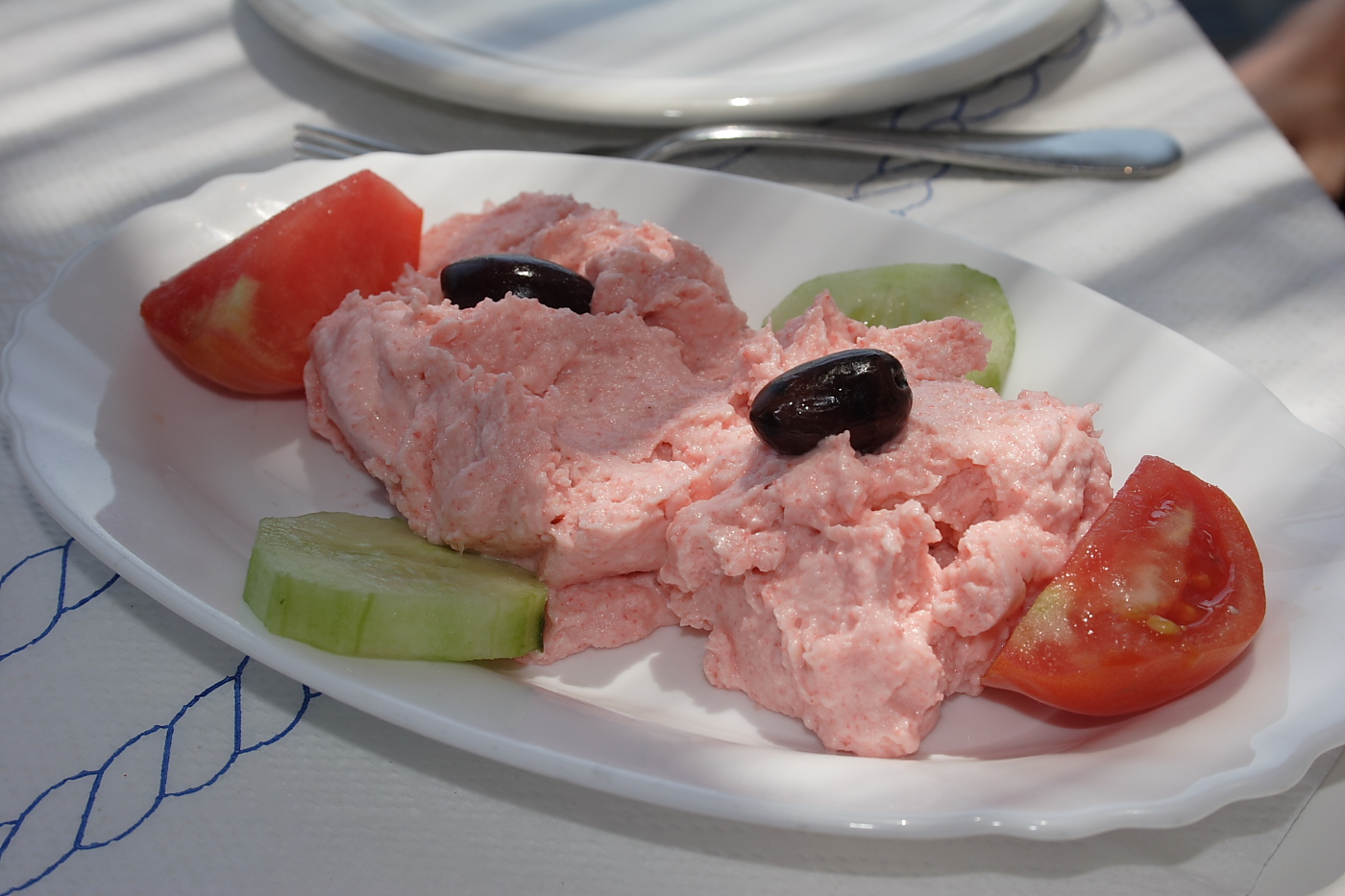
Taramosalata

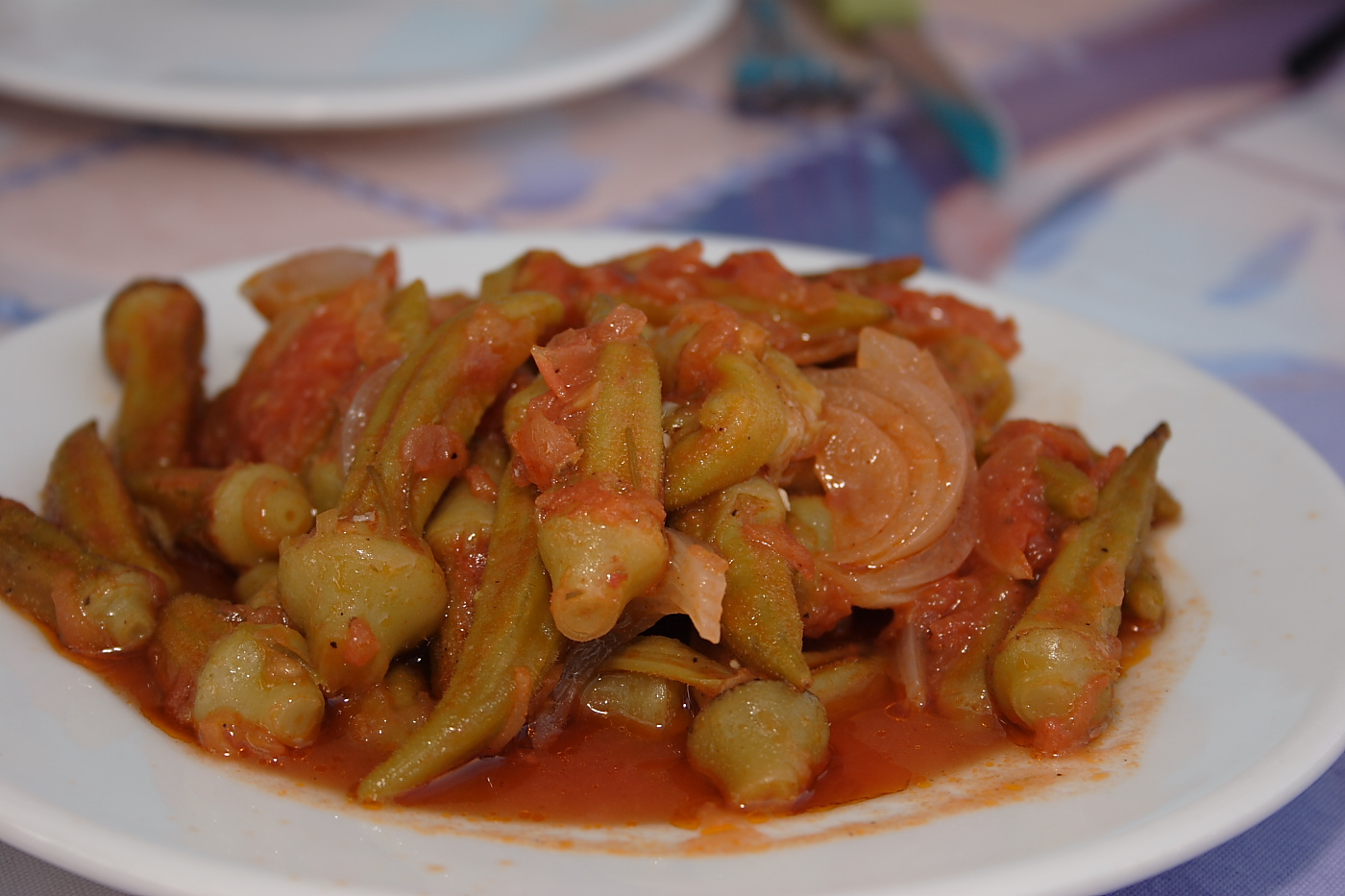
Bamies (okra with tomato and oil)

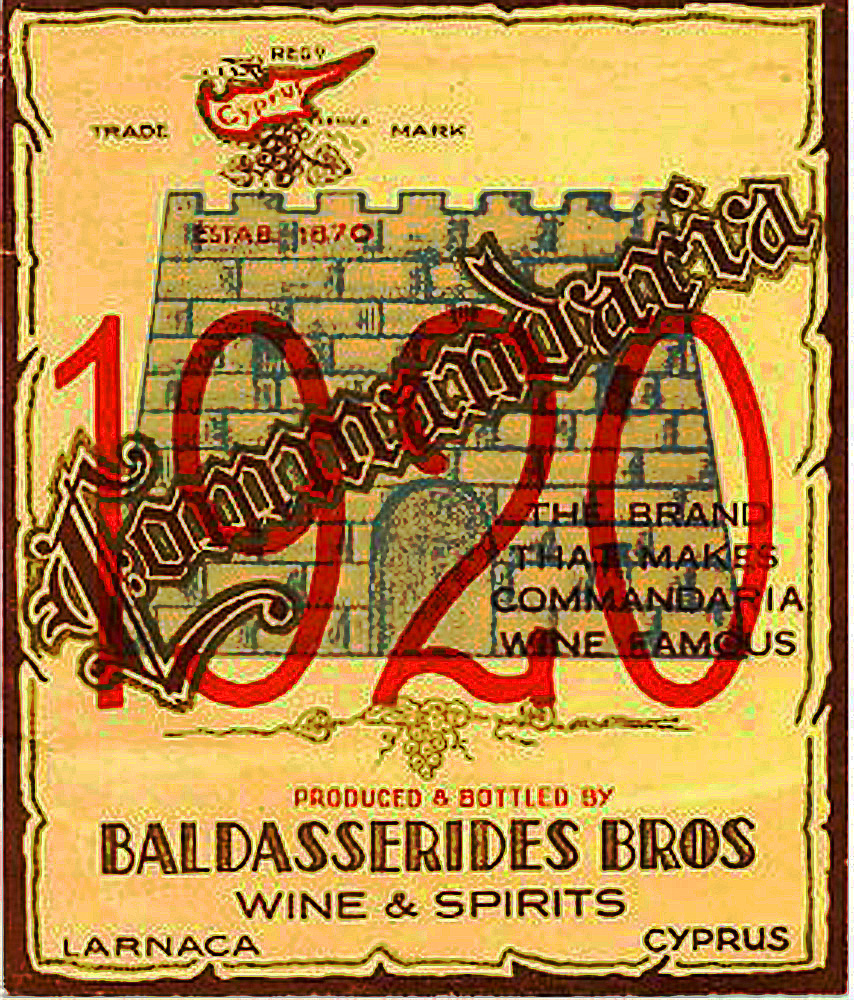
Drink, commandaria /south region of the island/

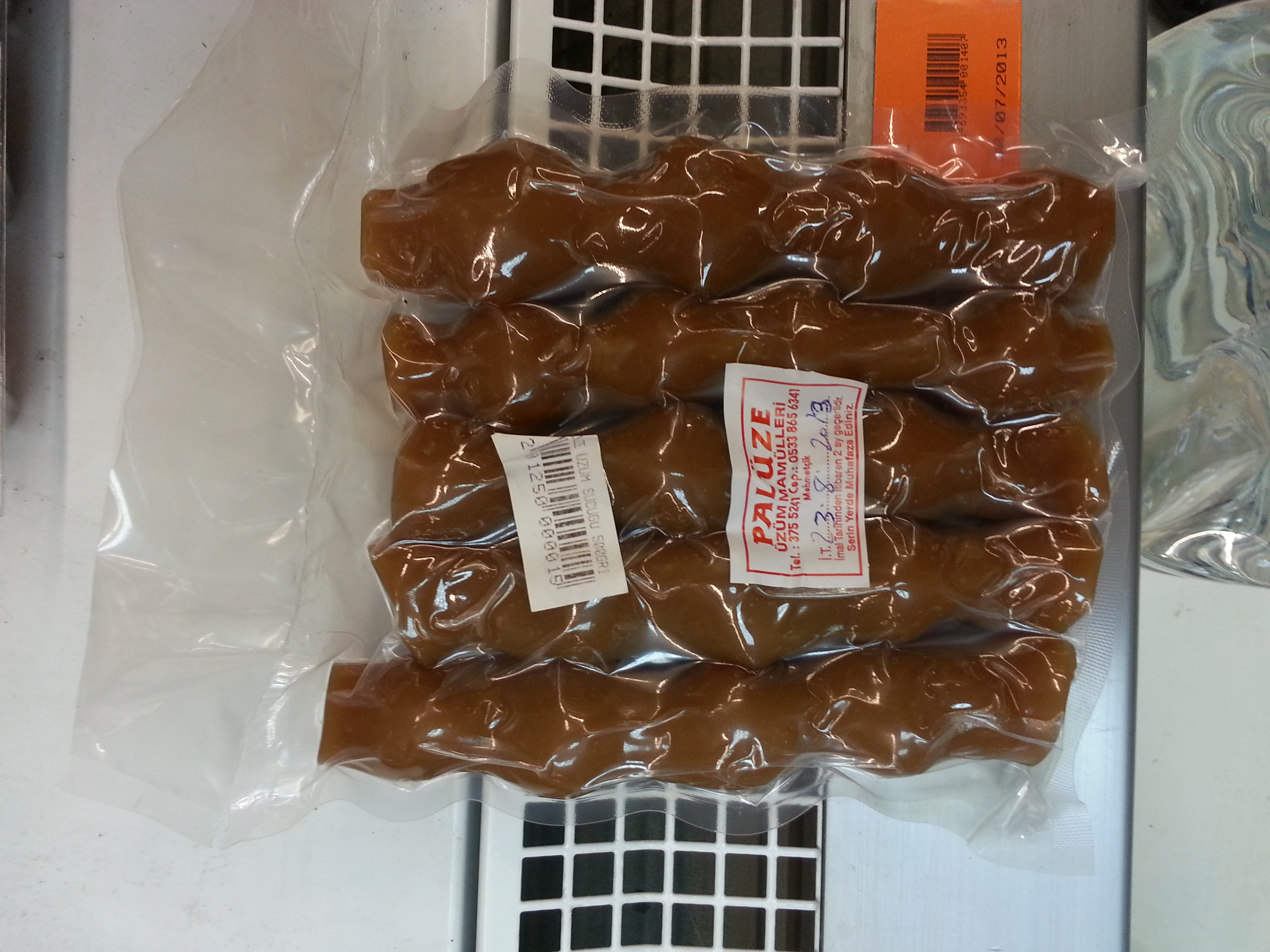
Shoushouko, a Cypriot dessert made from grape

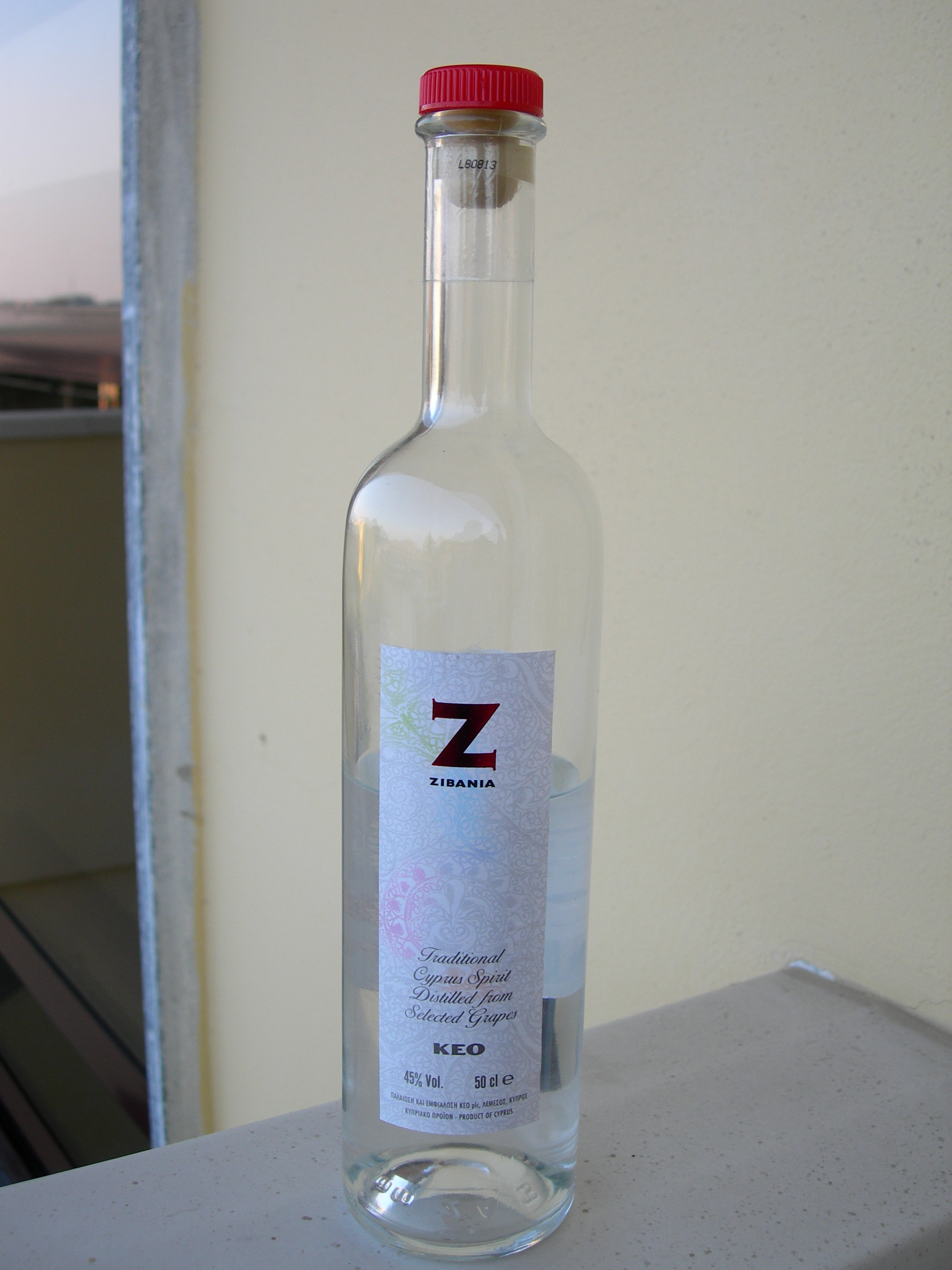
Cypriot Zivania

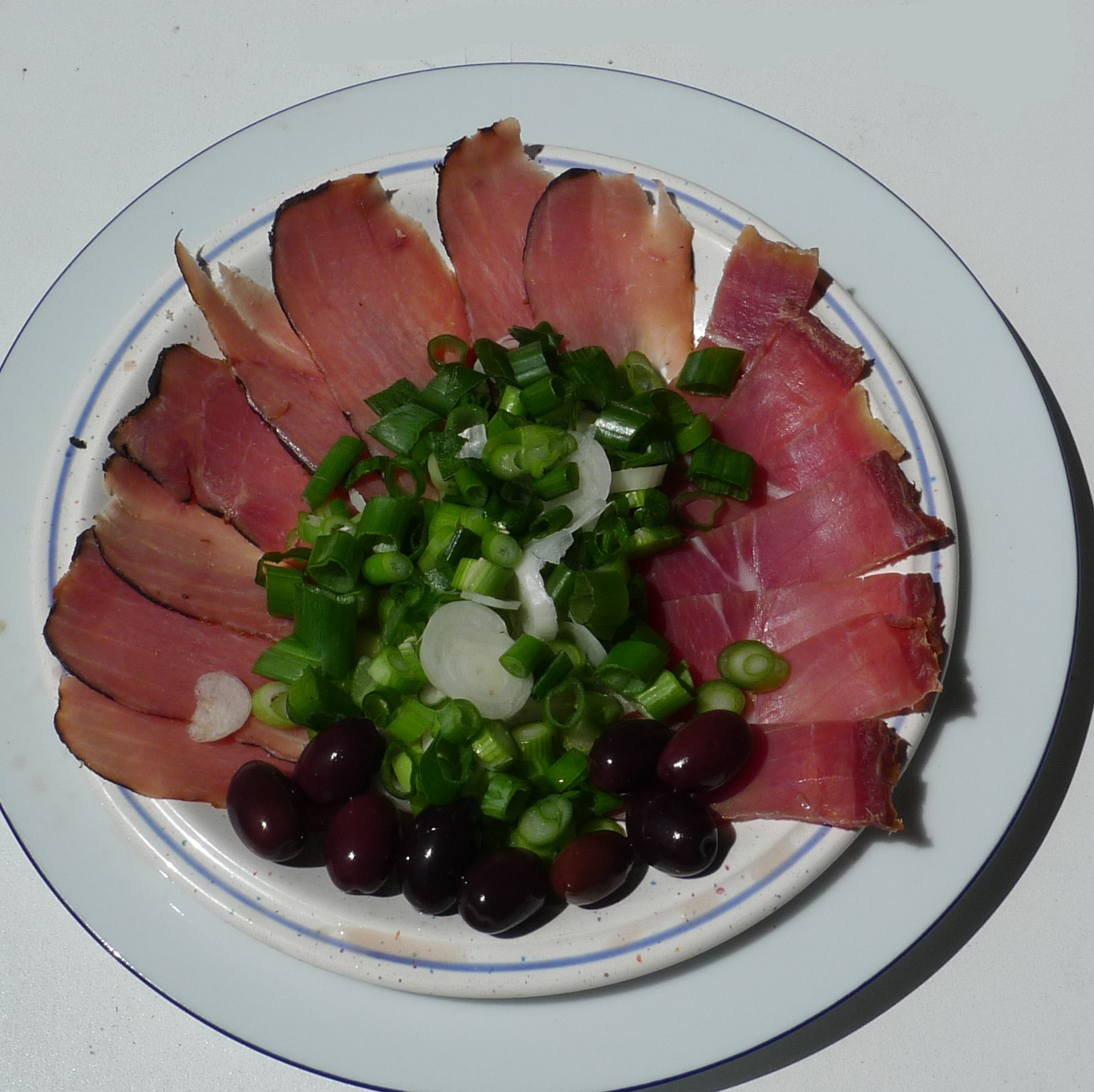
Meat meze with sliced lountza, chiromeri, onions and olives
