= Koloni, Cyprus =

Koloni Κολώνη
- Location in Cyprus
- Coordinates: 34°45′5″N 32°27′51″E
- Country: Cyprus
- District: Paphos District

Population (2001)
  - Total: 254
- Time zone: UTC+2 (EET)
  - Summer (DST): UTC+3 (EEST)
- Postal code: 6013

Koloni (Greek: Κολώνη) is a village in the Paphos District of Cyprus, located 5 km east of Paphos and east of Geroskipou Municipality.
