= Pentaskhinos =

Pentaskhinos is the location of a submarine communications cable system landing point on the island of Cyprus.

The following cable systems land at Pentaskhinos:

- MedNautilus
- MINERVA
- CADMOS
- UGARIT
