= UGARIT =

Transoceanic cable in the Mediterranean Sea

UGARIT is a submarine telecommunications cable system in the Mediterranean Sea linking Cyprus and Syria.

It has landing points in:

- Pentaskhinos, Cyprus
- Tartous, Syria

It has a design transmission capacity of 622 Mbit/s and a total cable length of 239 km. It started operation on 6 February 1995.

== Sources ==
- "Technical Information". Archived from the original on 2011-06-08.
