= Cured pork tenderloin =

Meat delicacy

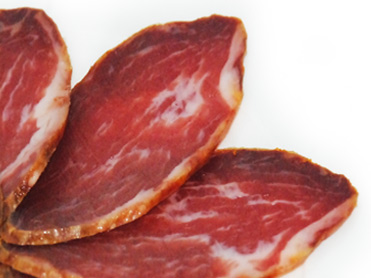
- Spanish lomo
- Main ingredients: Pork

Cured pork tenderloin is found in various cuisines in Mediterranean Europe and South America. It is typically salted or brined then dry-cured or smoked.

== In different countries ==
=== Spain ===
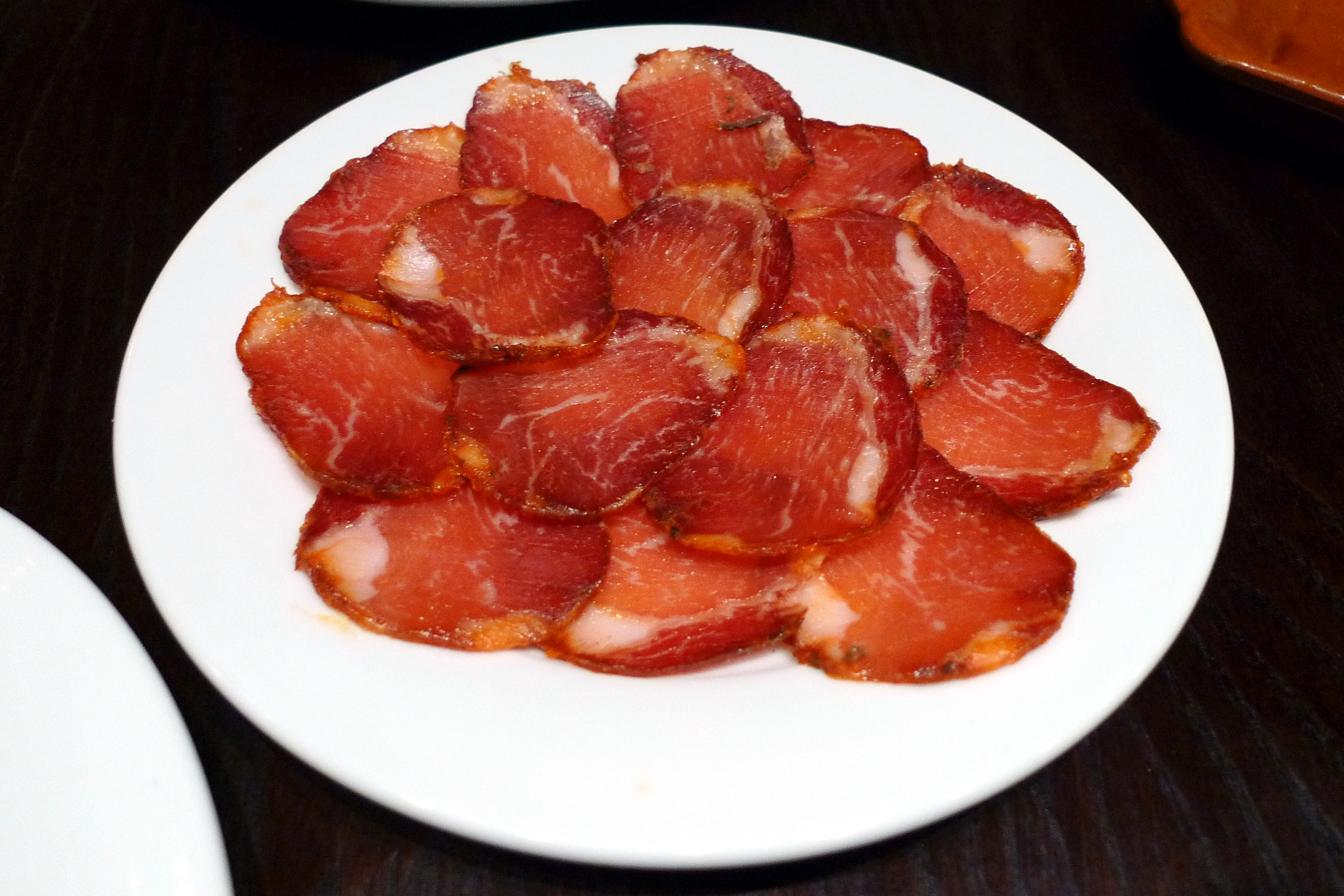
Spanish caña de lomo or lomo embuchado

In Spanish cuisine, lomo embuchado is a dry-cured meat made from pork tenderloin, sometimes called caña de lomo or just lomo. It is similar to cecina, but with pork instead of beef.

=== Italy ===
In Italian cuisine, there are many variants of lonza stagionata. Capocollo is very similar, but made from the neck muscle rather than the tenderloin, and often stuffed into a casing. In the northeastern border region of Trieste and surroundings as well as coastal Slovenia and Istria in Croatia (influenced by Venetian culture) it is also known as ombolo.

=== Corsica ===
In Corsican cuisine, lonzu is cured loin.

=== Cyprus ===
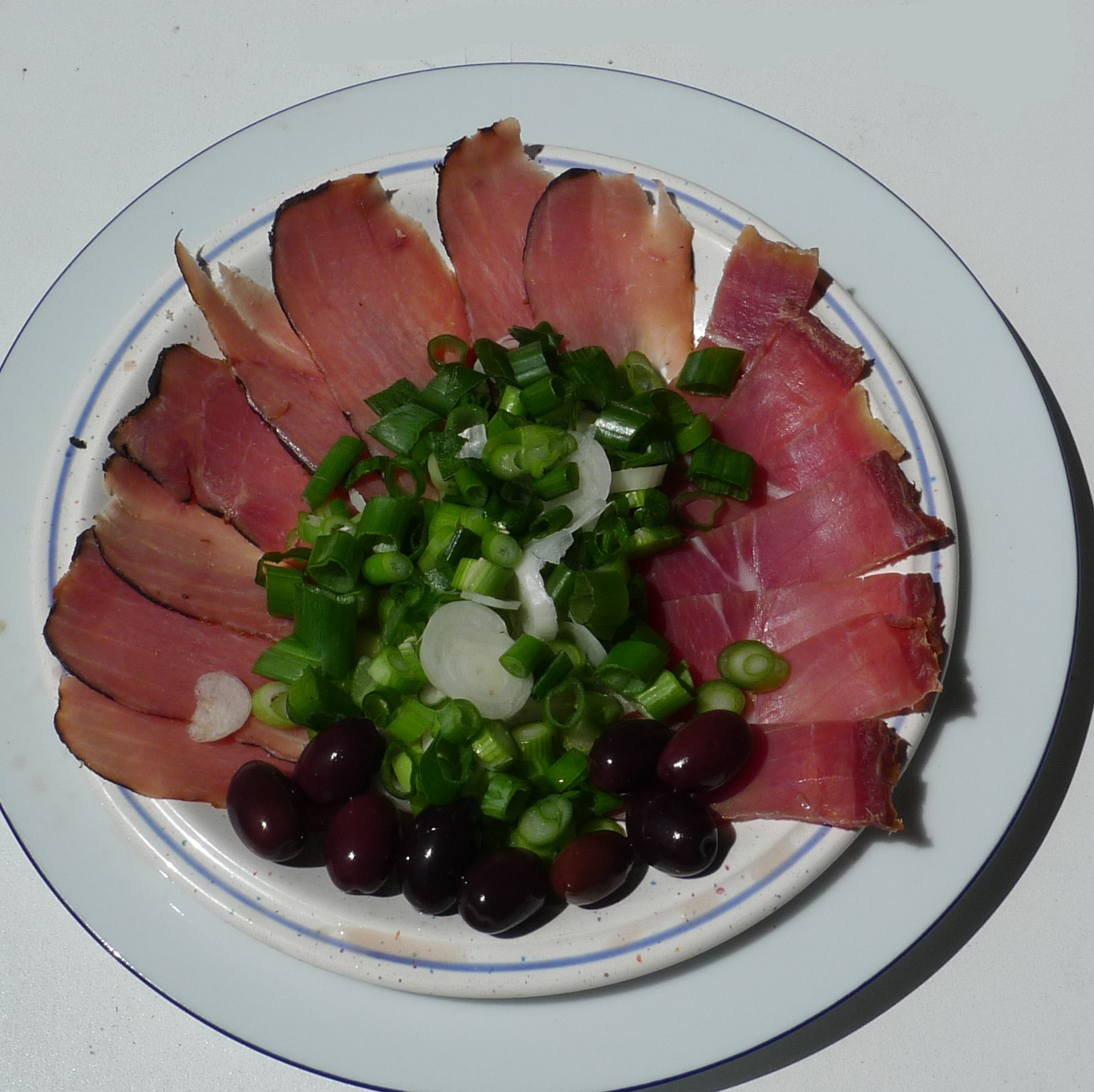
Sliced lountza (left) along with chiromer, onions and olives

In Cypriot cuisine, lountza (Greek: λούντζα) is made of pork tenderloin, which is first brined and marinated in red wine, then dried and smoked.

It may be sold immediately after smoking, or aged. As it ages, it becomes harder and more strongly flavored. It may be spiced with coriander.

Lountza may be served cooked or uncooked with alcoholic drinks such as zivania or wine. Grilled lountza served with other Cypriot foods such as halloumi and kefalotyri cheese often appears in meze platters. Sandwiches made of grilled lountza and halloumi are favorite fast food snacks in Cyprus.

=== Greece ===
In the northern Cyclades islands of Greece (Mykonos, Syros, Andros, Tinos), louza is preserved pork loin.

=== Bosnia and Herzegovina, Croatia, Montenegro and Serbia ===
In Bosnia and Herzegovina, Croatia, Montenegro and Serbia smoked, cured loins, tenderloins and shoulder blade are called pečenica (literally "that which is baked") or vješalica (literally "that which is hung"). They are commonly made of pork but beef varieties are also not uncommon. The terms (respectively) refer to the process of smoking over heat and being hung on hooks above the source of the smoke while they're left to cure. The cuts are universally prepared only during the winter and are considered winter food. The latter of two terms is more commonly used for the shoulder blade cut, whereas the tenderloin cut is sometimes also called slatka (sweet) pečenica.

Unlike Mediterranean-style cured meats like prosciutto, pancetta and buđola (capocolla) traditionally made in drier, littoral and near-littoral southern parts of these countries, smoke-cured loins are traditionally cured meats from the inner continental regions and harsh, freezing continental winters are a big part of curing specifics and flavor.

The cuts are first brined in solution of salt and garlic (locally salamura), to enhance flavor and help preservation, commonly together with continental-style bacon (slanina locally), lardon (also called slanina, sometimes white bacon or soap bacon) and ribs. Then they are cured by hanging them in freezing winter winds, over a smoldering lumber (smoke being essential part of the flavor) for typically up to two months, because the freezing continental temperatures and lack of insects in the winter help curing and preservation. The smolder is occasionally extinguished completely to expose the meat fully to the freezing wind.

The flavor is, as a consequence, much more intensely smoked and garlic tinged than is the case with Mediterranean-style cured meat and the cuts are typically drier and harder. They are typically served as cold cuts, as part of traditional meze, but are also used as flavoring for various cooked dishes.

=== Bulgaria ===
In Bulgaria, the cured pork loin is known as "Filet Elena" (Филе Елена).

== Etymology ==
All of the names above come directly or indirectly from Latin lumbus "loin", apart from the Slavic terms from Balkans region which are derived from the actual method of preparation.

== See also ==
- List of dried foods
- List of smoked foods
