= Souvlaki =

Greek fast food

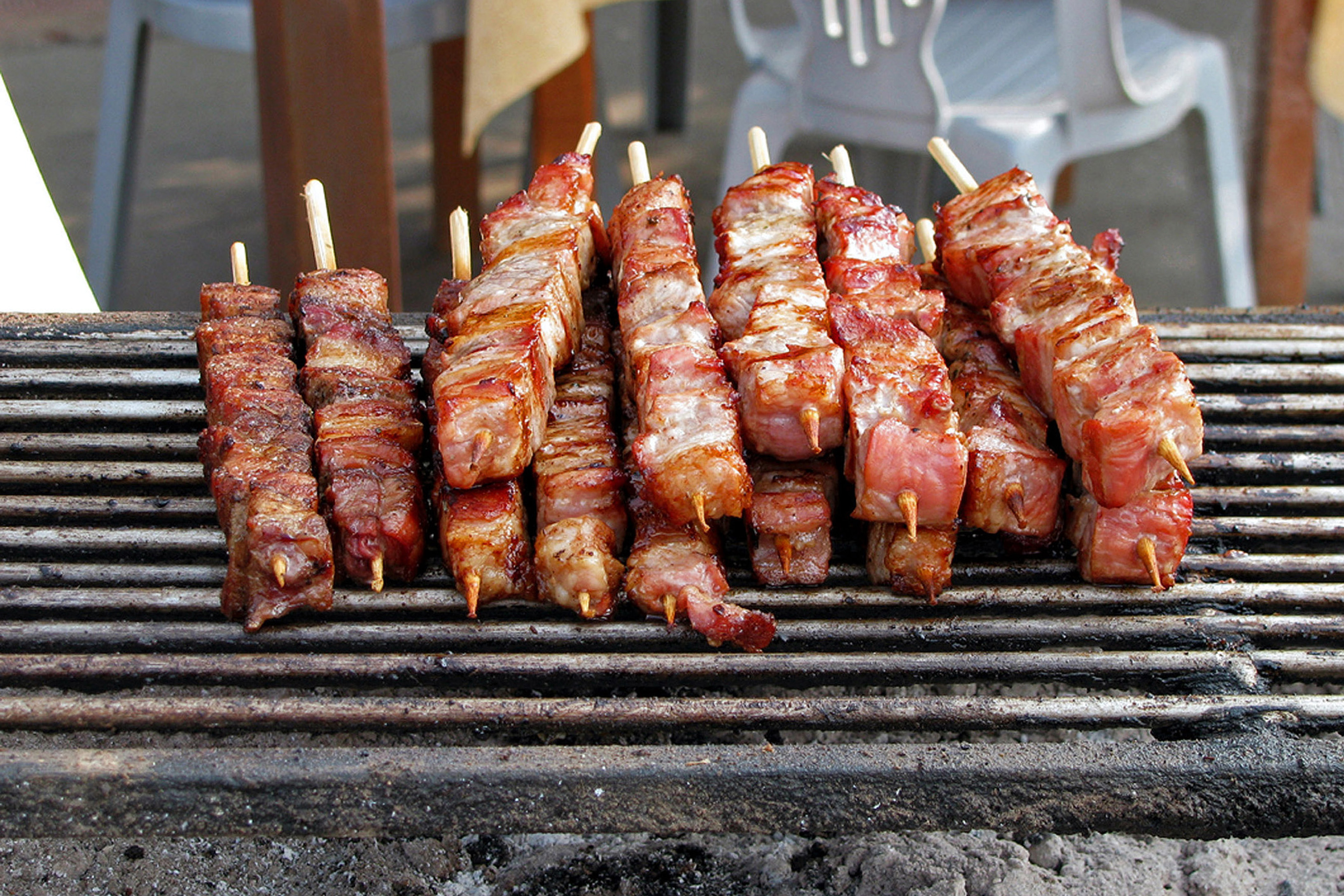
- Multiple Souvlaki on a grill
- Place of origin: Greece
- Region or state: Greece, Cyprus
- Associated cuisine: Greek cuisine, Cypriot cuisine
- Main ingredients: Various meats, herbs, spices and marinades

Souvlaki (Greek: σουβλάκι, romanized: souvláki, IPA: [suˈvlaci]; plural: σουβλάκια, romanized: souvlákia) is a Greek food consisting of small pieces of meat and sometimes vegetables grilled on a skewer. It is usually eaten straight off the skewer while still hot. It can be served with or inside a rolled pita, typically with lemon, sauces, vegetables such as sliced tomato and onion, and fried potatoes as a side. The meat usually used in Greece and Cyprus is pork.

== Etymology ==
The word souvlaki is a diminutive of the Medieval Greek soúvla (σούβλα, 'skewer') itself borrowed from Latin subula. Souvlaki is the common term in Macedonia and other regions of northern Greece, while in southern Greece and around Athens it is commonly known as kalamaki (καλαμάκι, 'small reed' or 'little straw').

== History ==
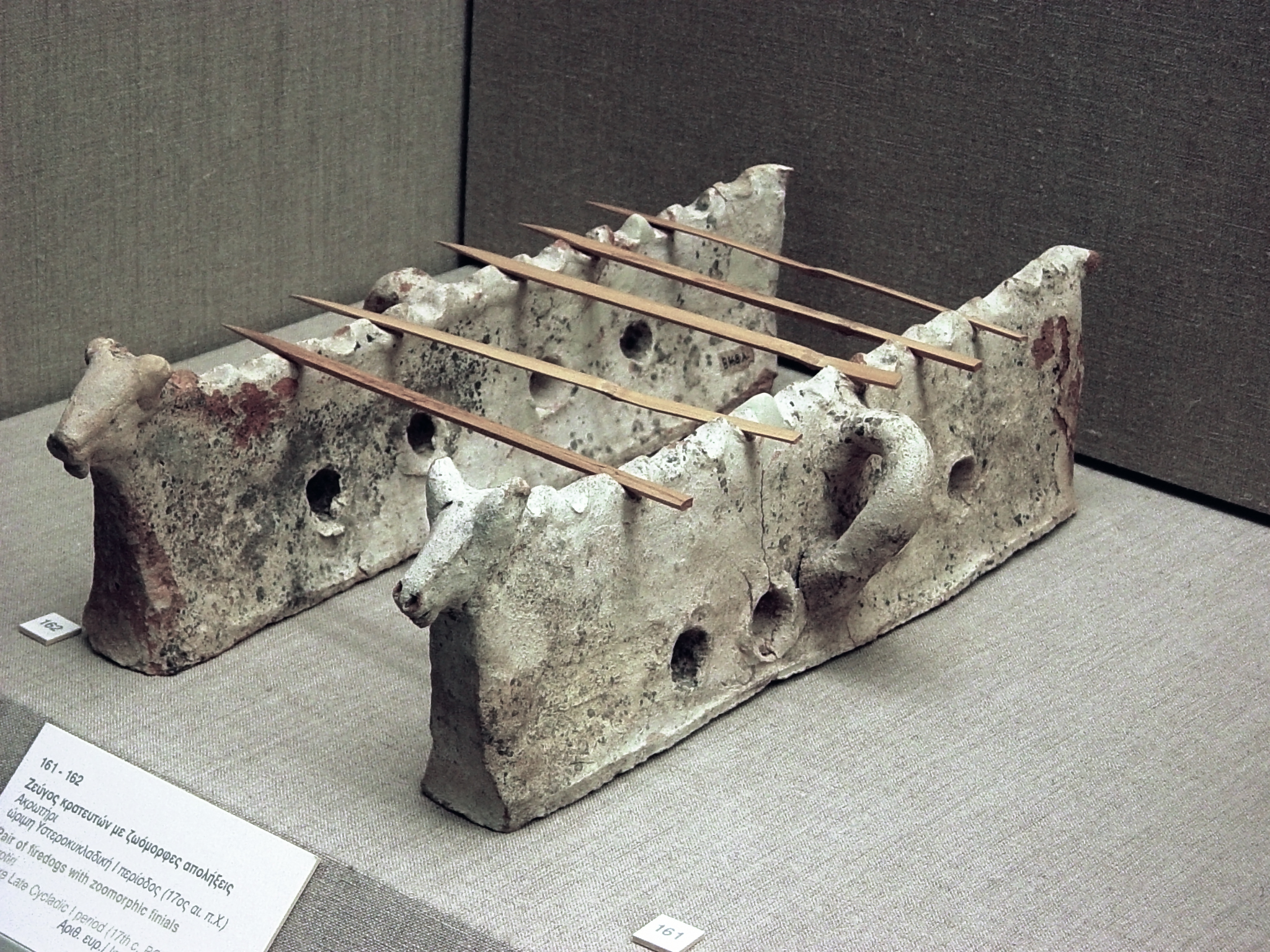
Pair of firedogs with slots for holding skewers, 17th century BC, Akrotiri

In Greek culture, the practice of cooking food on spits or skewers dates to the Bronze Age. Excavations in Santorini, Greece, unearthed sets of stone cooking supports used by the natives of the island before the Thera eruption of the 17th century BC; souvlaki was "a popular delicacy in Santorini back in 2000 BC". In the stone cooking supports, there are pairs of indentations that were likely used for holding skewers and the line of holes in the base allowed the coals to be supplied with air.

In Mycenaean Greece, "souvlaki trays" were discovered in Gla, Mycenae, and Pylos. The "souvlaki trays" (or portable grills) used by the Mycenaean Greeks were rectangular ceramic pans that sat underneath skewers of meat. It is not clear whether these trays would have been placed directly over a fire or if the pans would have held hot coals like a portable barbecue pit. Spit supports appear to "continue in use into the Early Iron Age at Nichoria". In Greek literature, Homer in the Iliad (1.465) mentions pieces of meat roasted on spits (ὀβελός); this is also mentioned in the works of Aristophanes, Xenophon, Aristotle, and others. In Classical Greece, a small spit or skewer was known as ὀβελίσκος (obelískos), and Aristophanes mentions such skewers being used to roast thrushes.

In the Byzantine Empire, the Greek author of the Prodromic Poems (4.231) mentions "the hot meat shops" of Constantinople providing clients with spit-roasted meat slices similar to souvlaki known as psenasis souglitarea.

Modern-day souvlaki was described by Gustave Flaubert, a French traveler, who observed Greeks "grilling pieces of meat on a bamboo stick" during his visit to the Boeotian countryside of southern Central Greece in 1850. However, modern-day souvlaki was not widely distributed in Greece until after World War II. Souvlaki skewers served as fast food started to be sold widely in the 1960s, after being introduced by vendors from Boeotia. The first known use of the word souvlaki in English was in 1942.

== Variations ==
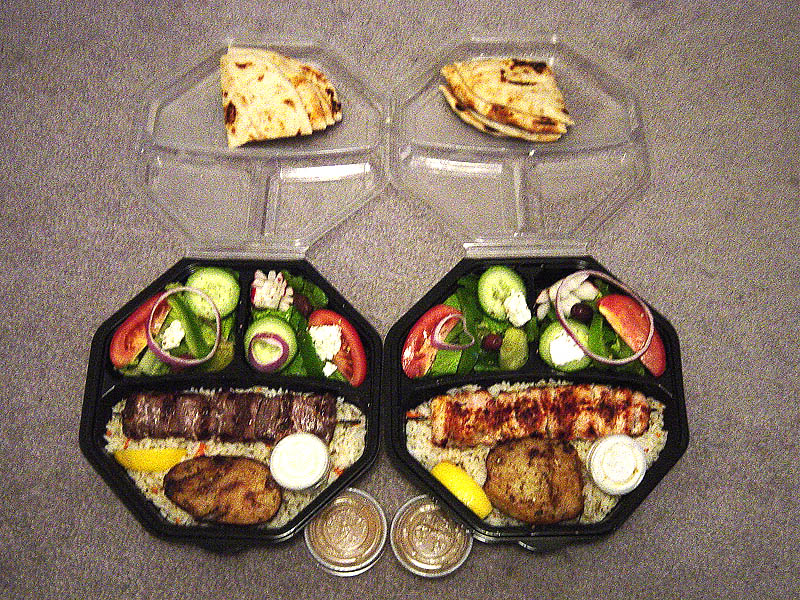
Souvlaki take-out platters

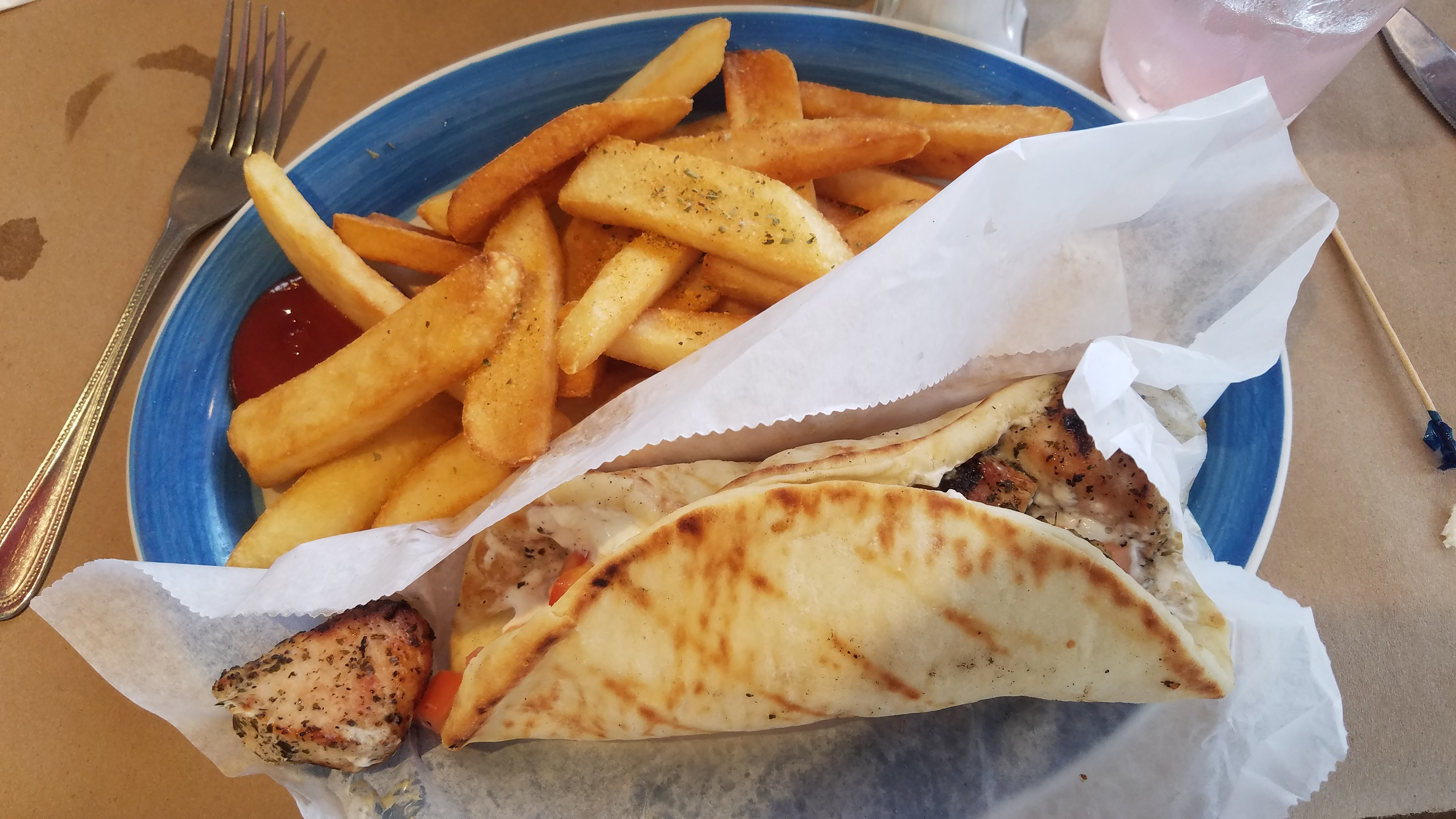
Chicken souvlaki pita served with a side of French fries in a restaurant in the United States

Gyros-style seasoned ground meat packed on a skewer and grilled like souvlaki in Athens

=== Kalamaki ===
Kalamaki (καλαμάκι meaning "small reed") is a synonym for souvlaki proper in Athens where the word souvlaki is used colloquially for any kind of pita wraps. Kalamaki can also be accompanied with vegetables such as tomato, peppers, and onions, and a sauce, with lemon wedges. There are some places in Greece where kalamaki is not connected in any way to souvlaki such as Thessaloniki; in these regions, souvlaki refers to the dish that in Athens is called kalamaki.

=== Souvlaki-merida ===
Merída (μερίδα) means portion in Greek. While souvlaki is eaten plain as a fast food, it is also served as a full plate, served with fried potatoes, vegetables, sauce, and quartered pita bread. Usually it consists of the ingredients of a souvlaki-pita (see below) laid out on a plate. Pork is mostly used, but others can be used, such as chicken or lamb.

=== Souvlaki pita ===
Souvlaki-pita consists of grilled souvlaki meat folded in a lightly grilled pita along with sliced tomatoes and onions, and tzatziki sauce, and fried potatoes on the side – though increasingly they may be added to the folded pita. This variation is prominent at outlets run by Melbourne's Greek-Australian community.

In some areas, when chicken is used instead of pork, tzatziki and onions are replaced with a special yellow mustard sauce and lettuce. Other garnishes and sauces include ktipiti, Russian salad, and melitzanosalata.

=== Corfu ===
In Corfu, a special tomato sauce is added to souvlaki, plainly called "red sauce" (κόκκινη σάλτσα).

=== Cyprus ===
In Cyprus, souvlaki can refer both to the small chunks of meat on a skewer, and to the dish. It is made with a large pita that has a pocket-style opening. Into this is placed the meat (traditionally lamb or pork, more recently sheftalia or chicken), which in Cypriot souvlaki is cut into slightly larger chunks. Tomatoes, cucumbers and shredded white cabbage are the usual salad additions. Onion, parsley, and pickled green chili peppers are common accompaniments, as are yogurt and tzatziki.
