= MedNautilus =

Mediterranean fiber optic submarine cable system

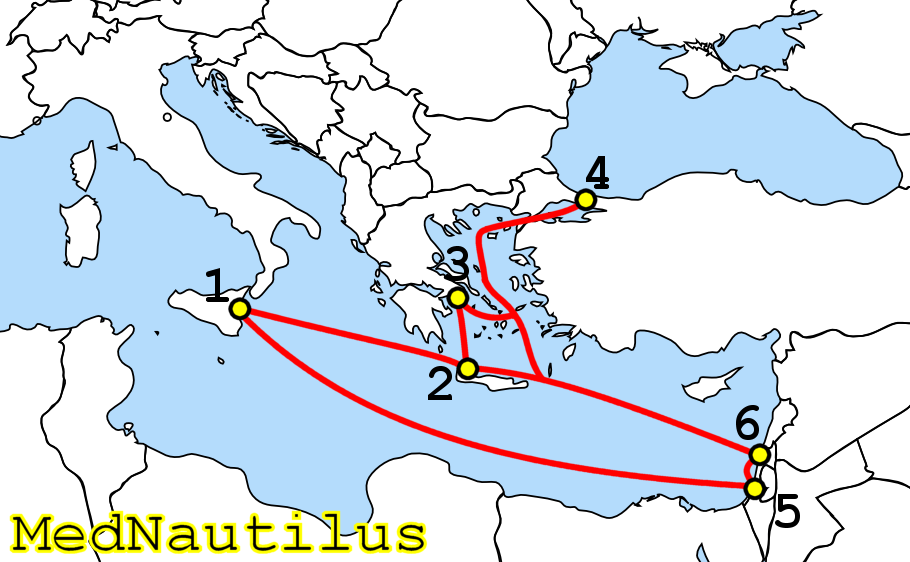
- Landing points: 1. Catania, Sicily, Italy; 2. Chania, Crete, Greece; 3. Koropi (Athens), Greece; 4. Istanbul, Turkey; 5. Tel Aviv, Israel; 6. Haifa, Israel; 7. Pentaskhinos, Cyprus
- Total length: 5,729 km
- Design capacity: 3.84Tb/s
- Technology: 6 fiber pairs
- Date of first use: 2001

MedNautilus is a submarine telecommunications cable system linking countries in the Central and Eastern Mediterranean Sea. It is a successor of the LEV system linking Cyprus, Israel, and Italy.

It has landing points in:

1. Catania, Sicily, Italy
2. Chania, Crete, Greece
3. Koropi (Athens), Greece
4. Istanbul, Turkey
5. Tel Aviv, Israel
6. Haifa, Israel
7. Pentaskhinos, Cyprus

The system comprises 5,729 km of cable. Its total design transmission capacity is 3.84Tb/s on 6 fiber pairs. All the landing points, except those in Turkey and Cyprus, are served by a cable ring which ensures uninterrupted service in case any single segment in the ring fails or has its cable severed.

Telecom Italia, which owns the MedNautilus and LEV systems held a virtual monopoly on international cable-based communications to and from Israel. This was changed in 2012 however, with Bezeq International completing a 12.8 Tbit/s submarine fiber optic cable to Italy and Tamares Telecom laying a 42 Tbit/s submarine fiber optic cable to Cyprus and France.

== See also ==
- LEV (cable system)
- Bezeq International Optical System (cable system)
- List of international submarine communications cables

== Sources ==
- http://www.mednautilus.com/UserFiles/File/map_big.jpg
