= LEV (cable system) =

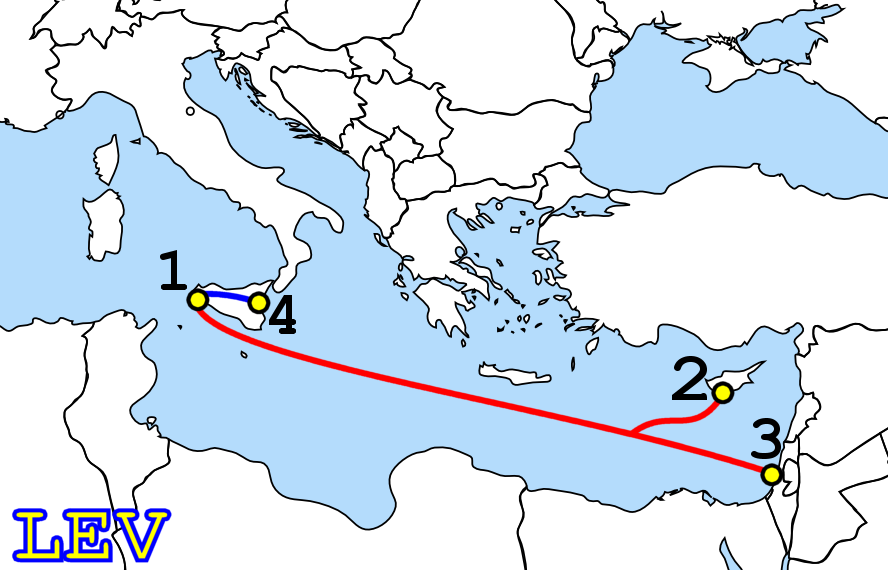
Route of the cable, Red is Submarine, Dark blue is terrestrial

LEV is a submarine telecommunications cable system in the Mediterranean Sea linking Italy, Cyprus and Israel.

It has landing points in:

1. Mazara del Vallo, Province of Trapani, Sicily, Italy
2. Yeroskipou near Paphos, Cyprus
3. Tel Aviv, Israel

Terrestrial section (Shown in blue) to:

4. Catania, Sicily, Italy

It has a design transmission capacity of 20 Gbit/s, starting operation at 5 Gbit/s and a total cable length of 2,600 km. It started operation in March 1999.

The cable consists of a cable with 2 fiber pairs. Each fiber pair has the initial design capacity of 8 wavelengths of around 1550 nm wavelength, which capable to carrying traffic at a data rate of 2.5 Gbit/s each.

The landing points are arranged in a ring, where each 2 landing points have exactly one fiber pair connecting them.

The system today serves mainly as a backup system to the newer and higher-capacity MedNautilus cable system.
