= CADMOS =

Submarine telecommunications cable system in the Mediterranean Sea

CADMOS is a submarine telecommunications cable system in the Mediterranean Sea linking Cyprus and the Lebanon.

It has landing points in:

- Pentaskhinos, Cyprus
- Beirut, Lebanon

It has a design transmission capacity of 622 Mbit/s and a total cable length of 230 km. It started operation on 8 September 1995. It was accidentally severed in july of 1998 by a commercial vessel which while anchoring destroyed the cable.
