= Bezeq International Optical System =

- Owners: Bezeq
- Landing points: Tel Aviv, Israel; Bari, Italy
- Total length: 2,300 km
- Design capacity: 12.8 Terabits per second
- Date of first use: 2012

Bezeq International Optical System – JONAH – is a submarine telecommunication cable linking Tel Aviv and Bari. The system, which is fully owned by Israeli communications company Bezeq, spans 2,300 km of cable, and extended terrestrially from Bari through Interoute's network to major European cities.

The system has been ready for commercial service since January 2012, currently operates using 40G channels and can support 100G channels in the future, increasing the ultimate capacity of the cable to over 12.8 terabits per second (Tbit/s), based on Alcatel-Lucent’s submarine communications networking technology.

== See also ==
- List of international submarine communications cables
- Bezeq
