= Sheftalia =

Cypriot sausage

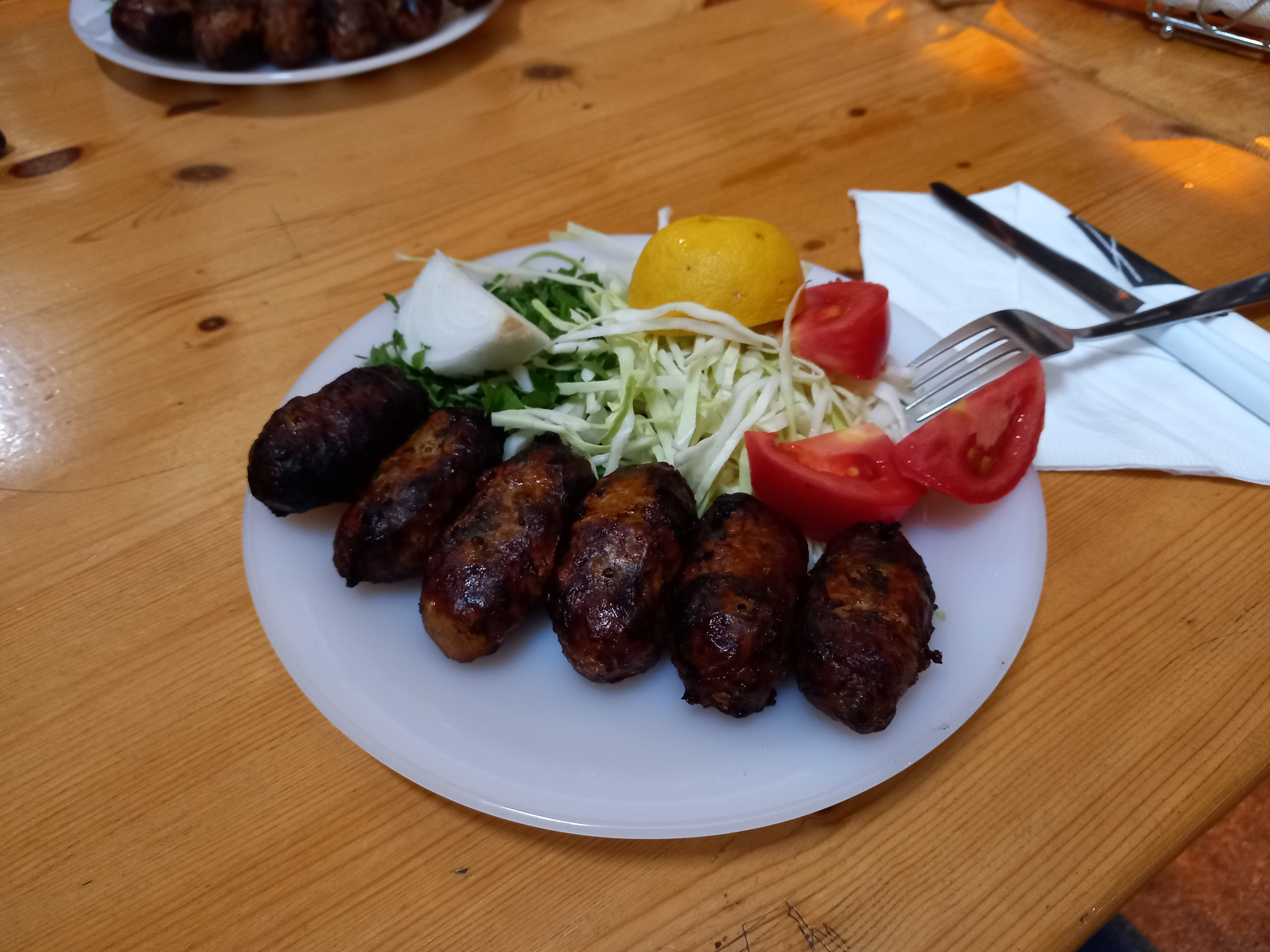
- Cypriot dish: Sheftalia
- Course: Main course
- Place of origin: Cyprus
- Serving temperature: Hot
- Main ingredients: Beef, lamb, or pork

Sheftalia (locally [ʃeftaˈʎa]; Greek: σεφταλιά; Turkish: Şeftali Kebabı) is a traditional sausage that originated in Cyprus. It is made from caul fat, or omentum, the membrane that surrounds the stomach of pig or lamb, to wrap the ingredients rather than sausage casing. It can be regarded as a type of crépinette.

Sheftalia is often regarded as one of the main staples in Cypriot cuisine.

The word sheftalia apparently originates from the Turkish word "Şeftali", meaning peach. This is likely due to the pinkish hue of the cooked meat. Another theory suggests the name came from a Turkish Cypriot street vendor called "Şef Ali" (Chef Ali), who sold a kebab called "Şef Ali kebabı,"(Chef Ali's Kebab), which eventually became "Şeftali kebabı" and then Sheftalia.
