= Geroskipou =

Geroskipou: Γεροσκήπου (Greek); Yeroşibu (Turkish)
- Village and municipal district
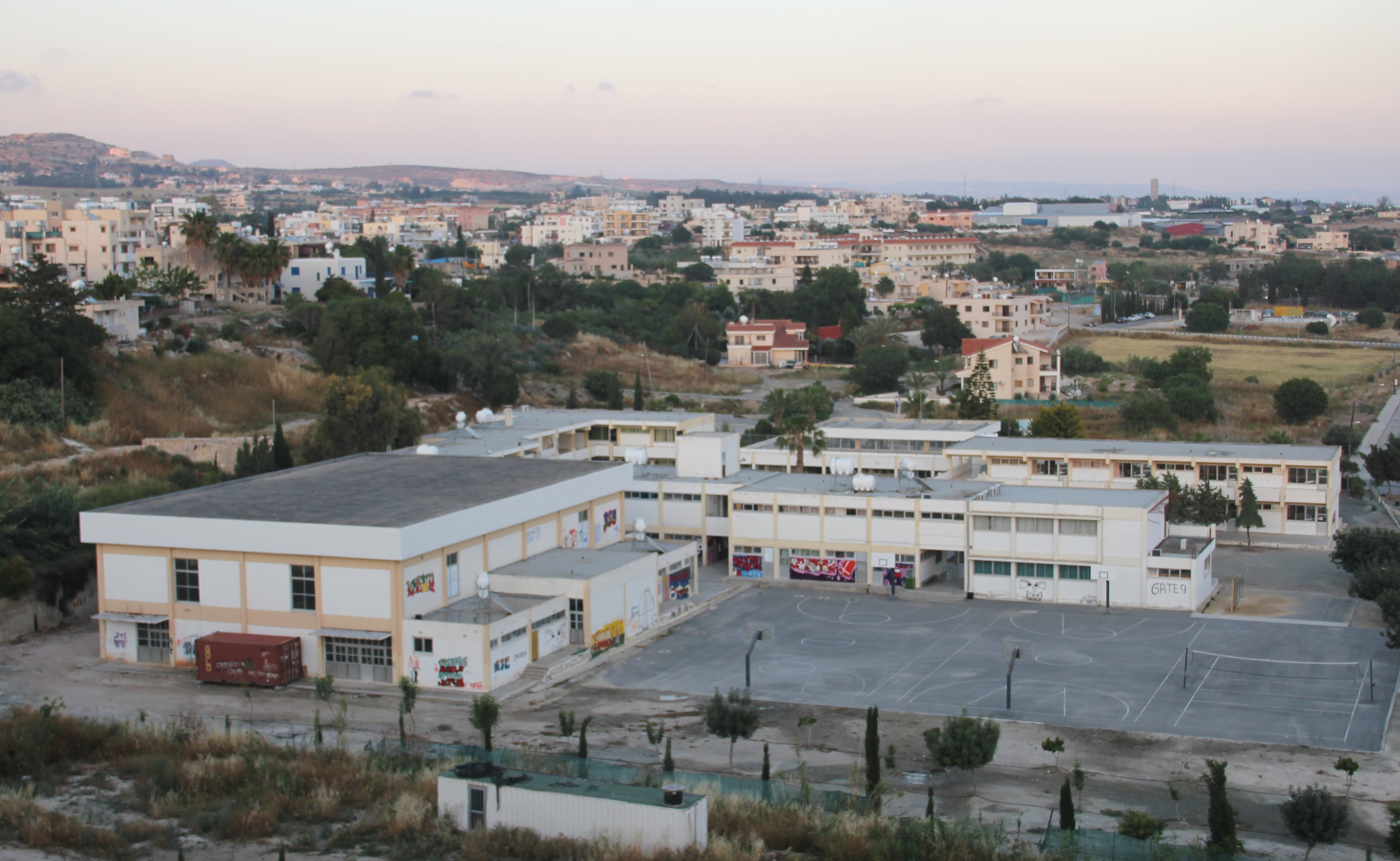

- Seal

- Location in Cyprus
- Coordinates: 34°46′N 32°28′E
- Country: Cyprus
- District: Paphos District
- Municipality: Ierokipia Municipality
- Elevation: 35 m (115 ft)

Population (2011)
  - Total: 8,313
- Time zone: UTC+2 (EET)
  - Summer (DST): UTC+3 (EEST)
- Postal code: 8200
- Website: https://geroskipou-municipality.com

Geroskipou (Greek: Γεροσκήπου; Turkish: Yeroşibu) is a coastal village and municipal district in the Paphos District of Cyprus. Its current population is approximately 7,000. It is noted for the production of lokum, a confectionery commonly known as Turkish delight in English, and is the only place in the world with protected geographical indication (essentially a trademark) for lokum.

== History ==
According to local tradition, and as is implied in the etymology of the town's name, Geroskipou was the site of the goddess Aphrodite's sacred gardens in Greek mythology. Its name, combining "yeros" (ιερός, holy) and "kipou" (κήπος, garden), means "holy garden". Ancient pilgrims from Nea Paphos passed through Geroskipou before reaching the temple of Aphrodite at Kouklia.

The Classical writer Strabo mentions Geroskipou, calling it Ἱεροκηπία (Hierokepía, Hierokepis). Many other travellers have written that in the coastal plain of Geroskipou, there were centuries-old olive and carob trees. In the 11th century, the five-domed Byzantine church of Agia Paraskevi was built in the middle of what is now Geroskipou. It is also mentioned that at Moulia, a coastal locality of the town, the miraculous icon of Panagia of Khrysorogiatissa was found by the monk Ignatios, who carried it to Rogia mountain from where the monastery took its name.

In 1811, Sir Sidney visited Geroskipou and met Andreas Zimboulakis, appointing him as a vice-consul of Britain. Zimboulaki, who was born in Kefalonia, settled in Geroskipou and his duties as vice-consul were to protect the interests of Britain. The house of Zimboulaki where many personalities were hosted, was bought in 1947 by the Department of Antiquities, to be converted into Folk Art Museum.

In 1821, the village had 30 adult male Turkish Cypriots and 76 adult male Greek Cypriots. By 1911, the village had a population of 602, with 477 Greek and 125 Turkish Cypriots. In the next decades, the Greek Cypriot population grew rapidly while the Turkish Cypriot population declined: in 1931, there were 751 Greek Cypriots and 105 Turkish Cypriots. In 1960, the village had a population of 1722, with 1552 Greek and 170 Turkish Cypriots. In 1925, a British company set up a silk factory in the village, which employed hundreds of workers both from Geroskipou and the surrounding villages until it closed in 1952. It is also mentioned that there was a linen-processing factory in Geroskipou.

Pre-1952, the small Turkish Cypriot population of the village mostly spoke Greek. The village lived off agriculture and Turkish Cypriots were mostly better off than their Greek Cypriot neighbours, though many villagers lacked titles to land and worked as day labourers. The village did not have a mosque, so the Turkish Cypriot villagers were allowed to use the church for their Muslim worship, and even practiced some Christian rituals at Easter. By 1952, efforts were underway to rebuild the roads of the village, Turkish language courses were scheduled for Turkish Cypriot children, and the school building was in ruinous condition.

In 1964, following the intercommunal violence and a battle in Paphos, the Turkish Cypriot villagers fled the village and sought refuge mostly in Koloni and Mandria. Some of these residents fled through the mountains to what would become Northern Cyprus following the Turkish invasion of 1974, whilst some were escorted there by UNFICYP in 1975. These 200 to 220 displaced people were resettled in Famagusta, North Nicosia, Kyrenia, Karavas, and Agios Georgios. The village was home to a camp for Turkish Cypriot prisoners of war in 1974. At least 329 people were held here; in their interviews with Turkish media, the POWs claimed that they were beaten and starved by their captors.

Geroskipou is known for producing lokum, a confectionery commonly known as Turkish delight in English. Although there is no definitive evidence of the origin of lokum, with multiple countries laying claim, Geroskipou is the only place in the world with protected geographical indication (essentially a trademark) for lokum.

== Gallery ==
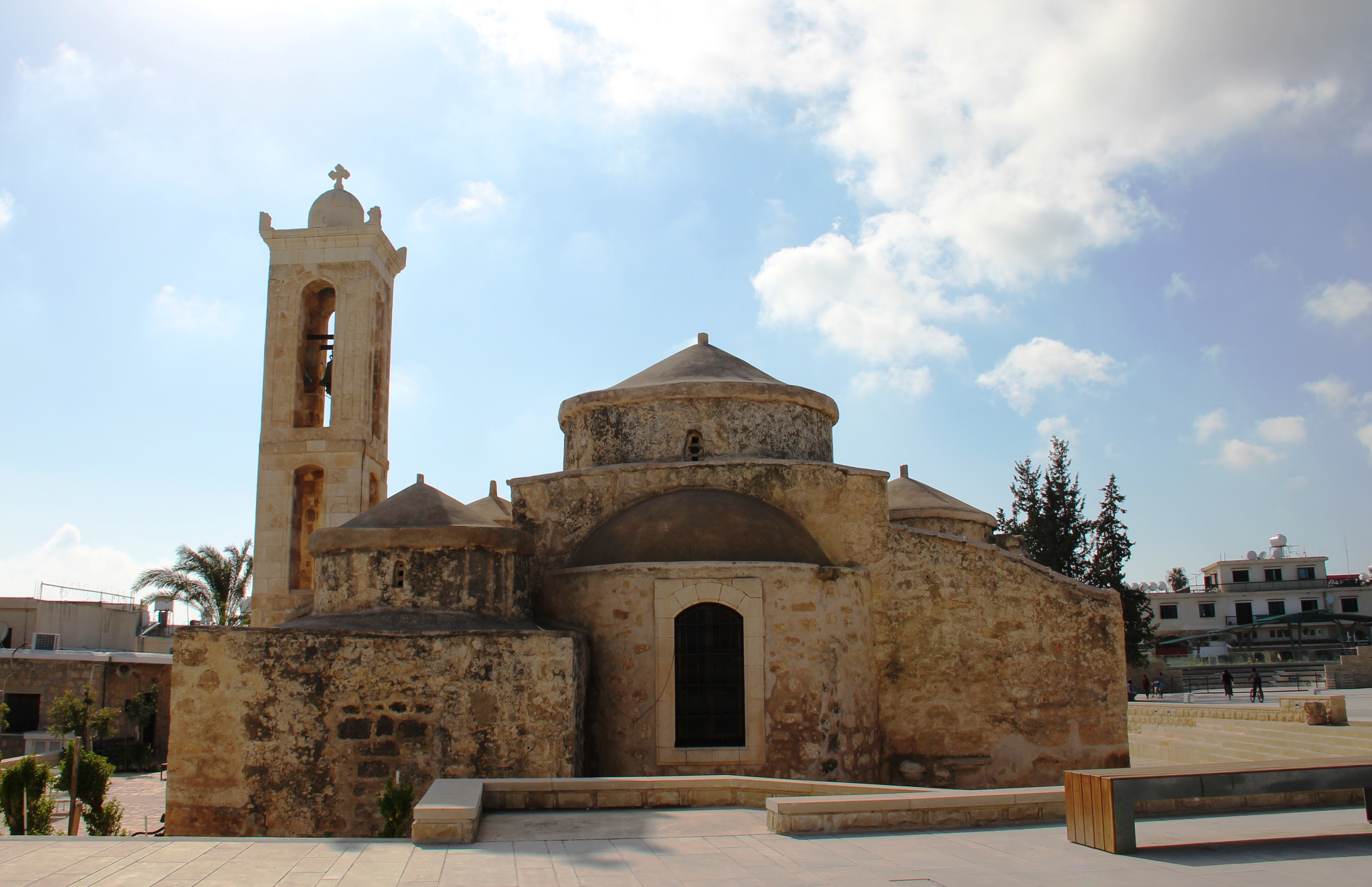
Agia Paraskevi church

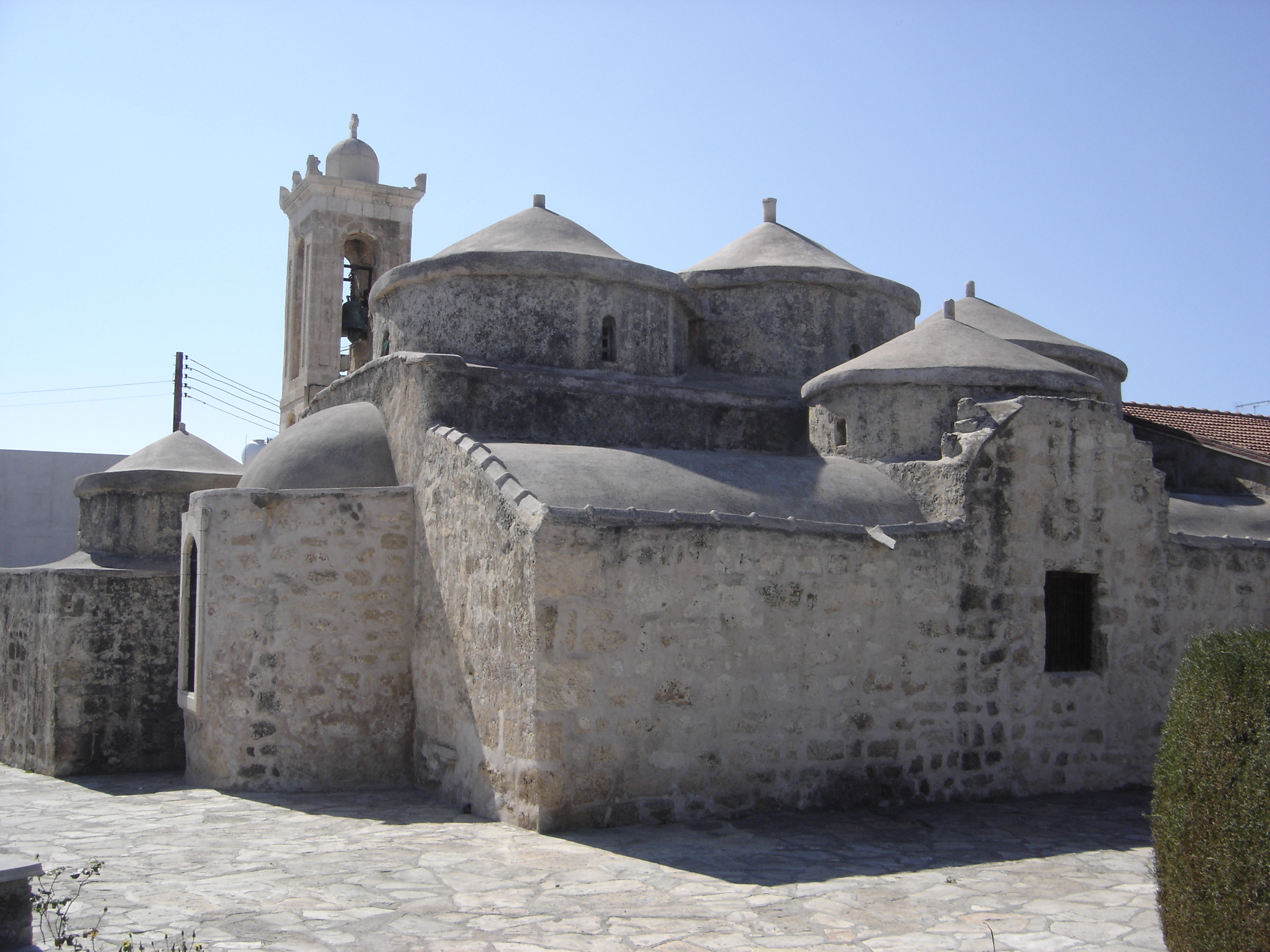
Agia Paraskevi church

== Twinnings ==
- Agia Paraskevi, Greece (2000)
- Fouras, France (date unknown)
