= CS Chamarel =

Cable layer ship owned by France Telecom Marine

History

Mauritius
- Name: Chamarel; Vercors
- Owner: France Telecom Marine
- Builder: Societé Nouvelle des Ateliers et Chantiers du Havre
- Completed: 1974–1975
- Renamed: 2002
- Identification: IMO number: 7347718; MMSI number: 645167000; callsign: 3BLV
- Fate: Wrecked after fire 8 August 2012
- Notes: Formerly Vercors

General characteristics
- Tonnage: 5,886 GT–8,575 GT
- Length: 135 m (442 ft 11 in)
- Beam: 18 m (59 ft 1 in)

The CS Chamarel, originally CS Vercors, was a cable layer owned by France Telecom Marine, laying submarine communications cables around the world. It was built in 1974 and destroyed by a fire in August 2012. As the Vercors, the ship laid cables on and between all continents except Antarctica, including numerous trans-Atlantic cables and the first ever Israeli-made cable, and set the record for the deepest submarine buried cable lay in 2000. The ship was badly damaged by a fire and driven aground on 8 August 2012.

== History ==
=== Service ===
The Vercors was built in 1974 by the Société Nouvelle des Ateliers et Chantiers du Havre. It started operation out of La Seyne-sur-Mer in 1975. In the 1970s it laid cables to and from France, including the now-decommissioned ANNIBAL, except ANTINEA, which stretched from Morocco to the Ivory Coast through Senegal.

In the 1980s the Vercors laid the ATLANTIS between Portugal and Senegal, TAT-7 and TAT-8, and others across most continents. In 1991 it deployed EMOS-1, the first Israeli-made submarine communications cable. Other projects in the 1990s included TASMAN 2 (1992; Australia – New Zealand), TAT-9 (1992; Trans-Atlantic), PacRimEast (1993; Hawaii – New Zealand), SEA ME WE 2 (1994; Southeast Asia – Middle East – Western Europe), Columbus II (1994; Trans-Atlantic), TAT-12 and TAT-13 (1995), SEA ME WE 3 (1995), ARIANE-2 (1995; France–Greece), ITUR (1996; Italy–Turkey–Ukraine), KAFOS (1996; Turkey–Bulgaria), TAGIDE-2 (1996; France–Portugal), ALETAR (1997; Egypt–Syria), BERYTAR (1997; Lebanon–Syria) and others.

In 2000, it set the world record for the deepest undersea buried communications cable while laying the Southern Cross Cable, at a depth of 1,610 meters (5,280 ft). It was also involved in TAT-14 and the East Asia Crossing projects in the early 2000s. After it was renamed to the Chamarel in 2002 and transferred to France Telecom Marine, it was assigned to maintenance on the SAT-3/WASC cable system and operated from Cape Town, South Africa.

=== Fire ===
The Chamarel caught fire off the shore of the Skeleton Coast, close to Walvis Bay, in Namibia on August 8, 2012, following a mission to repair the SAT-3/WASC cable system. It had a crew of 51 to 56 on board, which evacuated to the fishing vessel Moni. Six of them were lightly wounded and none died. The research ship Nathaniel Maxuilili helped put out the fire, which raged until August 9, before a salvage team was sent to retrieve the Chamarel.

== Technical specifications ==
The CS Chamarel was 135 meters (442 ft 11 in) long and 18 meters (59 ft 1 in) wide. It had a gross tonnage of 8,575 and deadweight tonnage of 5,900 tons. Its maximum speed was 12.9 knots (23.9 km/h) and the average speed was 11.2 knots (20.7 km/h).
