= Internet in Israel =

Broadband Internet in Israel has been available since the late 1990s in theory, but it only became practically accessible to most customers in 2001. By 2008, Israel had become one of the few countries with developed broadband capabilities across two types of infrastructure—cable and DSL—reaching over 95% of the population. Actual broadband market penetration stands at 77%, ranked 7th in the world. In 2010, Israel was ranked 26th in The Economist's Digital Economy Rankings. In 2022, Israel was ranked first for digital quality of life by Surfshark.

Internet in Israel is provided through the phone, cable and direct fiber to the home (FTTH) infrastructures, by Bezeq, Hot, IBC and Partner. Bezeq provides DSL and FTTH; IBC and Partner provide FTTH services, while HOT provides its own cable Internet services, as well as FTTH through IBC. Speeds range from 15 Mbit/s on ADSL to 5.0 Gbit/s on Bezeq's FTTH service.

== History ==
In November 1990, the undersea cable EMOS-1, connecting Israel with Turkey, Greece and Italy, was deployed. This was the first Israeli-built undersea cable, and was augmented by CIOS in April 1994. Since then, other cables have been laid which have provided large capacity links between Israel and abroad.

Until 1997, most domestic Internet traffic was routed either directly between ISPs, or through the Israeli universities' academic network operated by the IUCC. Since 1997, the Israel Internet Association has been responsible for operating the Israeli Internet Exchange (IIX) through which much of the domestic Internet traffic is routed.

Broadband Internet has been available in Israel via ADSL since the late 1990s in theory, but it only became practical to an average residential customer in 2001. This was enabled by a significant upgrade to the Internet infrastructure in 1999, at a cost of over a billion shekels. Since then prices have dropped considerably.

Also in 2001, the Communications Law of 1982 was amended to allow the provision of broadband Internet through the cable infrastructure.

Bezeq, the major local exchange carrier, began rolling out their Next Generation Network (NGN) in 2009 with theoretical speeds up to 100 Mbit/s by using a combination of fiber to the curb (FTTC) and ADSL2+/VDSL2 technologies. Initial product offerings of their NGN were 10 Mbit/s and 15 Mbit/s download and 800 kbit/s upload speeds over ADSL2+, with a best-effort package of up to 100 Mbit/s available starting October 2010. According to Bezeq, NGN will have reached 90 percent of the households in Israel by late 2011 and offerings of 100 Mbit/s would be provided by 2012. Bezeq's main competitor Hot started its UFI service on October 21, 2009, with DOCSIS 3.0 technology. This allowed up to 100 Mbit/s initially, subsequently rising to 500 Mbit/s.

In 2014, Israel Broadband Company (IBC) began laying the country's first FTTH infrastructure in Beersheba, through its Unlimited venture. It was joined by Partner in 2017, and Bezeq in 2021. The Ministry of Communications agreed that these infrastructure providers would not need to reach all Israeli households, but that they would contribute to a national fund to subsidize smaller companies that would deploy fiber to less economically viable areas. Noorcom is the first company to win a tender under this agreement, and it will deploy FTTH to certain Arab-majority areas. As of June 2021, 42% of Israel's total households were connected to FTTH infrastructure.

In 2022, the historical separation between infrastructure providers such as Bezeq and Hot, and service providers, imposed by the regulator, is set to expire.

== Connection specifications ==
=== Landline Internet ===
According to Ookla, as of May 2021 the average download speed in household broadband connections in Israel is 153 Mbit/s, while upload speeds average at 31 Mbit/s. According to data collected by M-Lab, as of May 2020 the average broadband download speed was 26 Mbit/s. Households connected to fiber to the home infrastructure can utilize lines of up to 2.5 Gbit/s. Others have access to up to 500 Mbit/s over cable, and up to 200 Mbit/s over DSL.

All DSL services require and use the PPPoE protocol, and cable modem connections generally operate over DHCP. For speed under 30 Mbit/sec, a cable user can select to use VPNs using the PPTP/L2TP protocol.

=== Mobile Internet ===
The three largest mobile phone carriers, Pelephone, Partner, and Cellcom, offer HSPDA service, typically 24 Mbit/s, over their respective 3G networks as well. Partner was the first provider to operate a consumer 4G (LTE) network, reaching a theoretical symmetrical speed of 100 Mbit/s. As of today, all major mobile carriers offer 4G LTE Advanced connectivity in the 1800 MHz and 2600 MHz frequencies, available in most populated regions in Israel, however these services are limited to about 20% of their maximum speeds since the Israeli Ministry of Communications has not completed allocating the full spectrum of the required frequencies. In September and October 2020, the three major carriers, plus Hot Mobile, received licenses and deployed their respective 5G networks.

=== ISP interconnectivity ===
Israel is connected abroad by three undersea cables: MedNautilus, owned by Telecom Italia, the Bezeq International Optical System, and Tamares Telecom's submarine cable. Domestic connectivity is provided by the Israel Internet eXchange (IIX), a central meeting point of the Internet Service Providers in Israel.

As of 2021, four additional submarine cables are planned: two as part of Cinturion's Trans European Asia System (TEAS), connecting India, the Middle East and Europe; and two by Google and Telecom Italia Sparkle: the Blue Submarine Cable System connecting Italy, France, Greece, and Israel, and the Raman Submarine Cable System connecting Jordan, Saudi Arabia, Djibouti, Oman and India. These projects are expected to be completed in 2024. The 160 tbps Quantum Cable will be added to the array of submarine communication cables that land in Israel, as part of the EuroAsia Interconnector.

== Internet service providers ==
Due to competition laws, every DSL or cable Internet user has to pay separately to the infrastructure provider and to the Internet service provider (ISP). Infrastructure is provided by Bezeq (via dial-up and DSL) and Hot (cable Internet). All cellular companies (Pelephone, Partner, Cellcom and HOT Mobile) provide wireless Internet infrastructure, and also serve as Internet service providers.

The three main Internet service providers are 012 Smile, 013 Netvision (including Internet Rimon) and Bezeq International. In 2006, the companies held market shares of 34, 33 and 30 percent, respectively, although these numbers include international phone calls. In all, as of August 2012, there were 43 companies with ISP licenses given by the Ministry of Communications.

=== Satellite ===
In Israel, Gilat Satellite Networks provides multi-gigabit per second broadband access to consumers and the defense industry by means of high throughput satellites.

== Internet censorship ==
In August 2009 no evidence of filtering was found by ONI in all areas.

Shas, a religious party in Israel, came up with an Internet filtering law, only making pornographic Internet site access permissive for users who identify themselves as adults and request not to be subject to filtering. In February 2008 the law passed in its first of three votes required, however, the government's law committee declined it.

In 2010 and 2011, Israel Police issued directives to all Internet service providers in Israel, including cellular providers, to block certain gambling websites. The ISPs complied with the order, even though its legality was unclear – both regarding the legality of using gambling sites in Israel, and the legality of the police ordering the blocking of websites. In 2012, the court ruled both that blocking websites, in principle, violated freedom of speech laws; and that the police directive itself was illegal.

In 2024 a law – aimed at Qatari news channel Al Jazeera – was implemented allowing minister of communications to order ISPs to block access to websites of foreign news networks.

== See also ==
- Communications in Israel
- Media of Israel
