= .il =

Top-level Internet domain for Israel

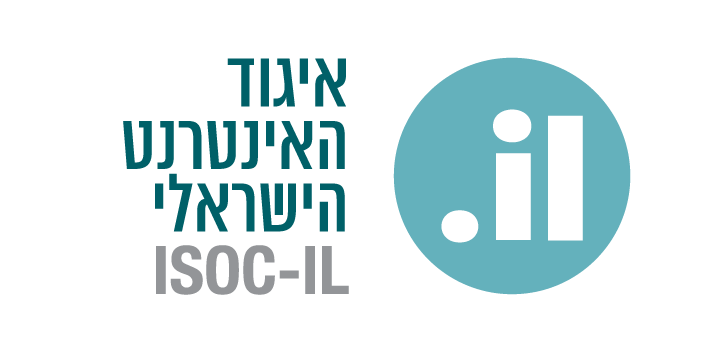
- Introduced: 24 October 1985; 40 years ago
- TLD type: Country code top-level domain
- Status: Active
- Registry: Israel Internet Association
- Sponsor: Internet Society of Israel
- Intended use: Entities connected with Israel
- Actual use: Popular in Israel
- Registered domains: 285,060 (2023-08-19)
- Registration restrictions: Limitations vary based on which 2nd-level domain registration is within; registry reserves right to screen and reject applications
- Structure: Names are registered at third-level within generic second-level categories; second-level name registry directly under .il not supported
- Documents: Registration rules
- Dispute policies: Optional dispute resolution via Advisory Committee
- DNSSEC: Yes
- Registry website: en.isoc.org.il

.ישראל
- Introduced: 22 November 2022; 3 years ago
- TLD type: Internationalized country code top-level domain
- Status: Active
- Registry: Israel Internet Association
- Sponsor: Internet Society of Israel
- Intended use: Entities connected with Israel with content in the Hebrew alphabet
- Registered domains: 22,186 (2023-08-19)
- Registration restrictions: Only Hebrew alphabet, digits, hyphens can be used.
- Structure: Names to be registered either at second-level directly under ישראל. or at third-level within generic second-level categories
- Documents: Registration rules
- DNS name: xn--4dbrk0ce
- Registry website: כולנו.ישראל

.il is the Internet country code top-level domain (ccTLD) of Israel, administered by the Israel Internet Association and managed by NIC - ISRAEL which hosts the DNS root server and manages the Israeli Internet Exchange, that supports IPv4 and IPv6.

The .il top-level domain is one of the earliest registered ccTLDs. When Israel registered it, on 24 October 1985, it was the third registration of any ccTLD, after .us and .uk, which were registered earlier that year.

As of 19 August 2023 there are 285,060 domain names registered under the .il ccTLD in Israel.

== Top-level domains in Hebrew script ==
On 19 May 2020, ICANN approved the use of the ישראל. domain, that was proposed in 2012. It was delegated on 11 February 2021, and since 22 November 2022 it is possible to register domain names in full Hebrew script.

Unlike the structure of .il, domain names registered under ישראל. may be either directly at second-level (for example: איגוד-האינטרנט.ישראל) or at third-level under one of these second-level domains:

- אקדמיה.ישראל.: Academic institutions; equivalent to .ac.il.
- ממשל.ישראל.: Government and Governmental System; equivalent to .gov.il.
- צהל.ישראל.: Israel Defense Forces; equivalent to .idf.il.
- ישוב.ישראל.: Municipal Government; equivalent to .muni.il.

There will not be a Hebrew-script equivalent to these second-level domains:

- .co.il
- .org.il
- .k12.il
- .net.il

As a more private initiative the top-level domain .קום ("com") was registered by VeriSign in 2016. It has as of 2020 many thousand second-level domains, mostly in Hebrew script, some in Latin script.

== Second-level domains ==
Domain names ending with .il will always be in the third level under one of these second-level domains:

- .ac.il: Academic Institutions; administration delegated to the Inter-University Computation Center.
- .co.il: Commercial Entities; administration delegated to five private registrars.
- .org.il: Non-commercial Organizations; administration delegated to five private registrars.
- .net.il: Israeli Internet service providers; available only to licensed providers by the Israel Internet Association.
- .k12.il: Schools and Kindergartens
- .gov.il: Government and Governmental System; administration delegated to Ministry of Finance.
- .muni.il: Municipal Government
- .idf.il: Israel Defense Forces; administration delegated to the army's Center of Computing and Information Systems.

Registration of other second-level domain names directly under .il is not supported.

Hebrew third level domains such as איגוד-האינטרנט.org.il are available since 2010.

== See also ==
- Country code top-level domain
