= CIOS =

CIOS may refer to:

- Cisco IOS, software used on routers and network switches
- Cyprus-Israel Optical System, a cable system linking Cyprus and Israel
- Channel Islands Occupation Society, a military history organisation
- Combined Intelligence Objectives Subcommittee, an organization gathering technical intelligence in Germany after WW2
- CIOS-FM 98.5 FM - A radio station licensed to Stephenville, NL
