= Léon Thévenin (ship) =

French cable-laying vessel

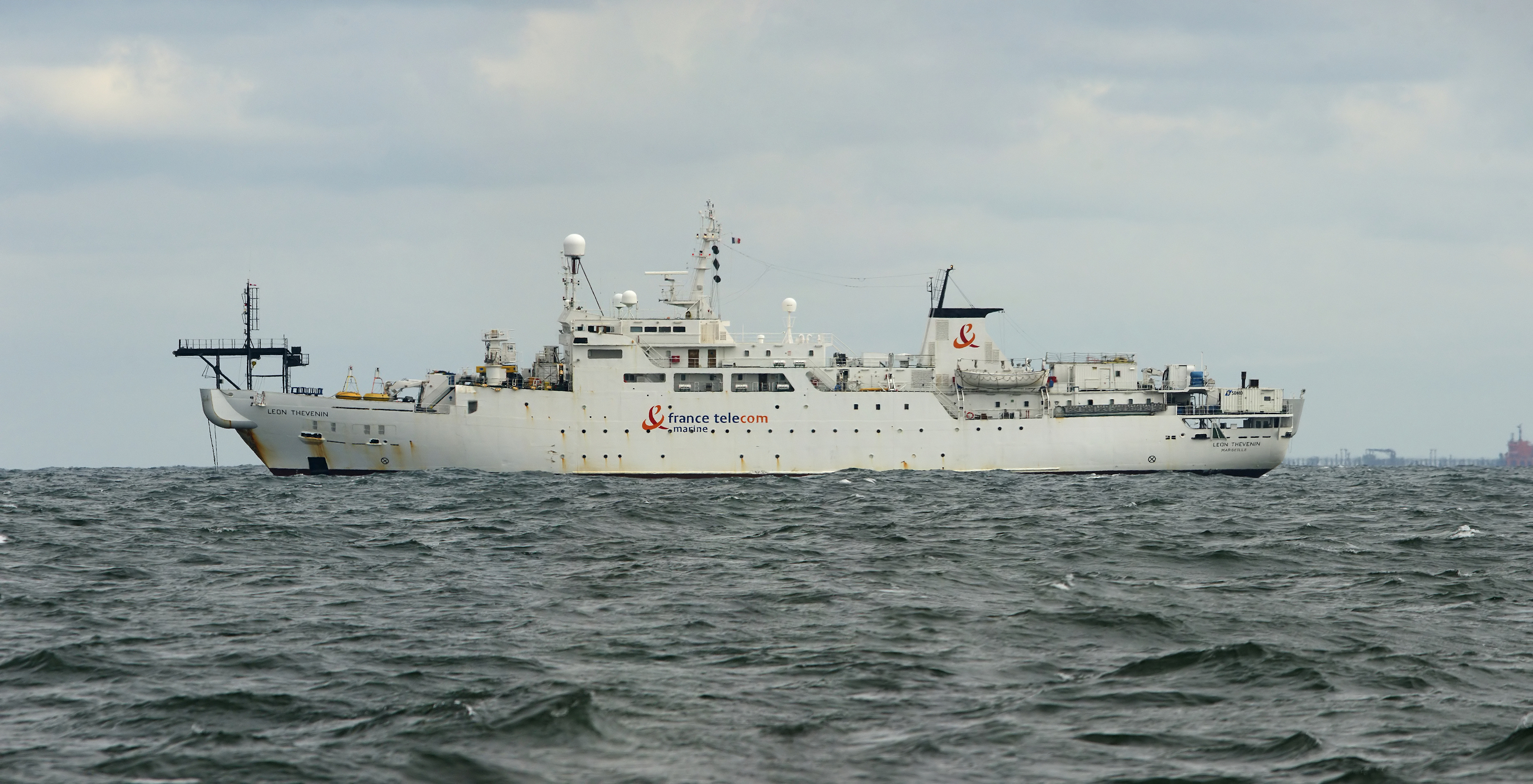

History

Mauritius
- Name: Léon Thévenin
- Owner: Orange Marine
- Completed: 1983
- Identification: IMO number: 8108676; MMSI number: 645400000; callsign: 3BSP

General characteristics
- Class & type: Cable Layer
- Tonnage: 5,887 GT
- Length: 107.82 m (353 ft 9 in)
- Beam: 17.8 m (58 ft 5 in)
- Draught: 5.7 m (18 ft 8 in)

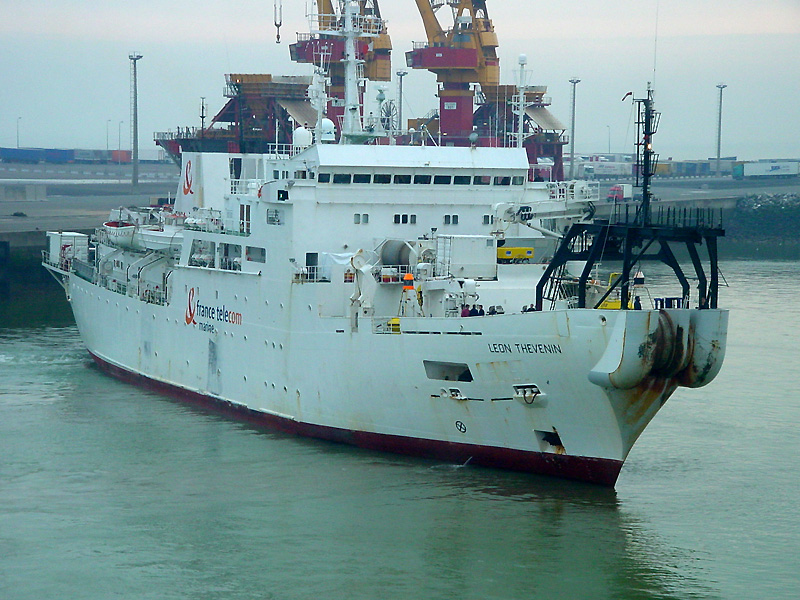

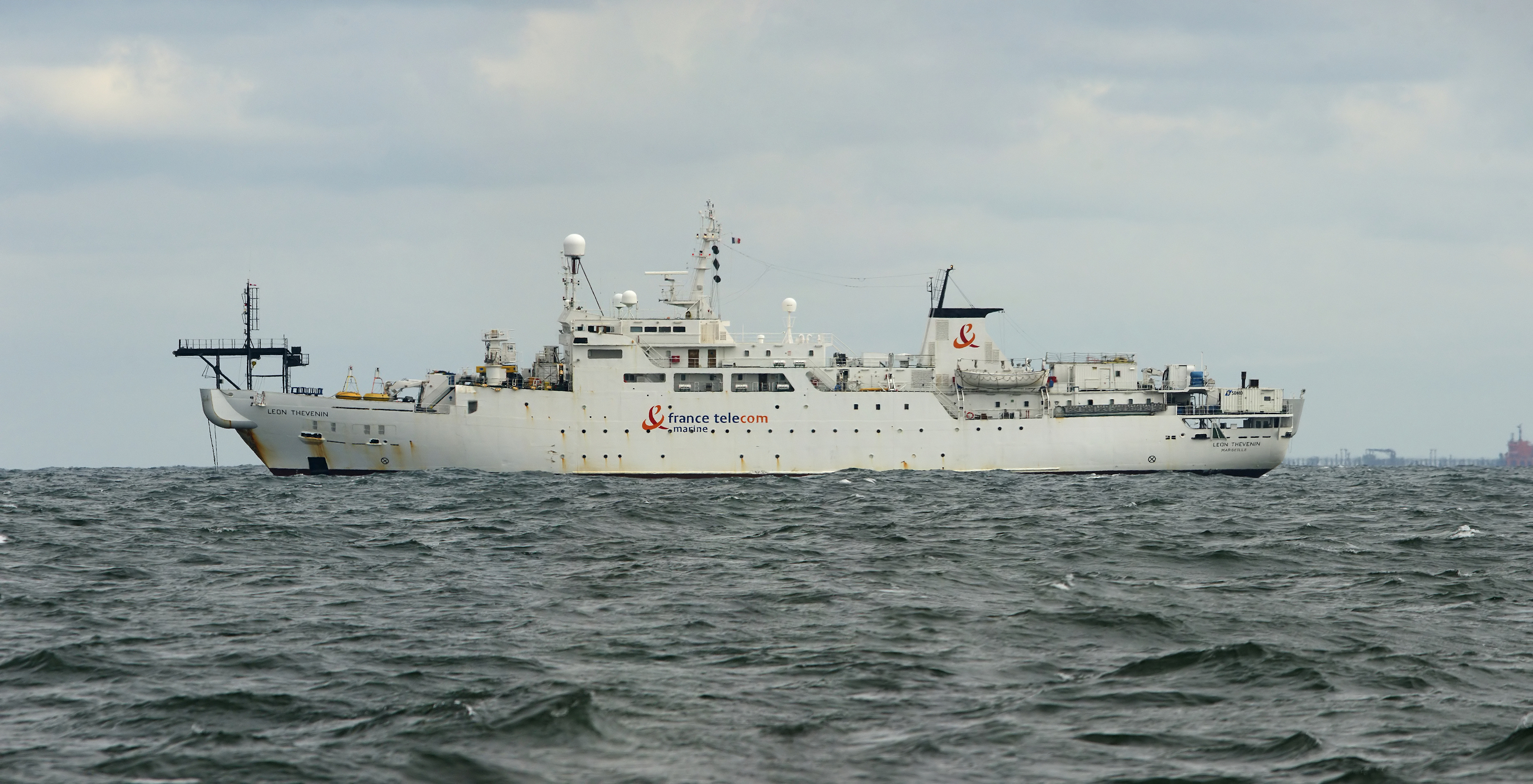

The Léon Thévenin is a French cable-laying vessel named in honour of French engineer Léon Charles Thévenin.

The Léon Thévenin was famously used in conjunction with a robot submarine named Scarab 1 for recovering the flight data recorder (FDR) and cockpit voice recorder (CVR) boxes from Air India Flight 182 that was destroyed in mid-air by a bomb as it was crossing Irish airspace, on 23 June 1985.

By 4 July, the sonar of the British ship Gardline Locater had detected signals on the seabed and on 9 July the CVR was pin-pointed and raised to the surface by the Scarab 1. The next day the FDR was located and recovered.

It is currently owned and operated by Orange Marine, operating out of the Port of Cape Town, and replacing the function of the CS Chamarel, which was previously stationed there to service African undersea fiber cables.
