= Orange Austria =

Austrian mobile network operator

Orange Austria Telecommunication GmbH
- Formerly: Connect Austria Gesellschaft für Telekommunikation GmbH (1998-2000); ONE GmbH (2000-2008)
- Type: Private company
- Industry: Telecommunications
- Founded: October 26, 1998; 27 years ago
- Founder: Mannesmann; TDC
- Defunct: August 19, 2013
- Fate: Merged into 3 Austria
- Successor: 3 Austria
- Headquarters: Vienna, Austria
- Area served: Austria
- Key people: Jan Trionow (CEO)
- Products: Mobile telephony
- Parent: Hutchison Whampoa
- Website: www.orange.at

Orange Austria (formerly ONE Austria) was an Austrian telecommunications company that provided mobile telephony services.

Founded in 1998 by Mannesmann and TDC, it was headquartered in Vienna.

With 1.9 million customers (including approximately 180,000 Tele2 customers) it is Austria's third largest provider with a market share of 20%. Orange cooperates with UPC Telekabel (a Liberty Global company) for landline and ISP offers.

In 2012, Hutchison Whampoa acquired the company, and in 2013 it merged into 3 Austria.

== History ==
ONE was founded on 26 October 1998 by Mannesmann and TDC as owner of the third GSM license of the country, and the first provider operating in the GSM-1800 band.

In 2000 Vodafone acquired Mannesmann and took his place in the shareholding of ONE.

Since 2004, the company successfully applied for a UMTS license and offers since 2005 also UMTS services.

In 2007 Vodafone sold its stake to Mid Europa Partners.

In 2008 France Télécom acquired TDC's stake, allowing the company to use the Orange brand. ONE was rebranded as Orange on 22 September 2008.

On 3 February 2012, Hutchison Whampoa announced that it would buy the company for US$1.7 billion. The deal closed on 3 January 2013. The combined business created a mobile carrier with 2.8 million customers and more than 20% market share in Austria. The Orange brand continued to operate in Austria until August 19, 2013, when its operations were merged into 3 Austria.
