= Orange Group =

French multinational telecommunications corporation

Orange S.A.
- Logo used since 2013

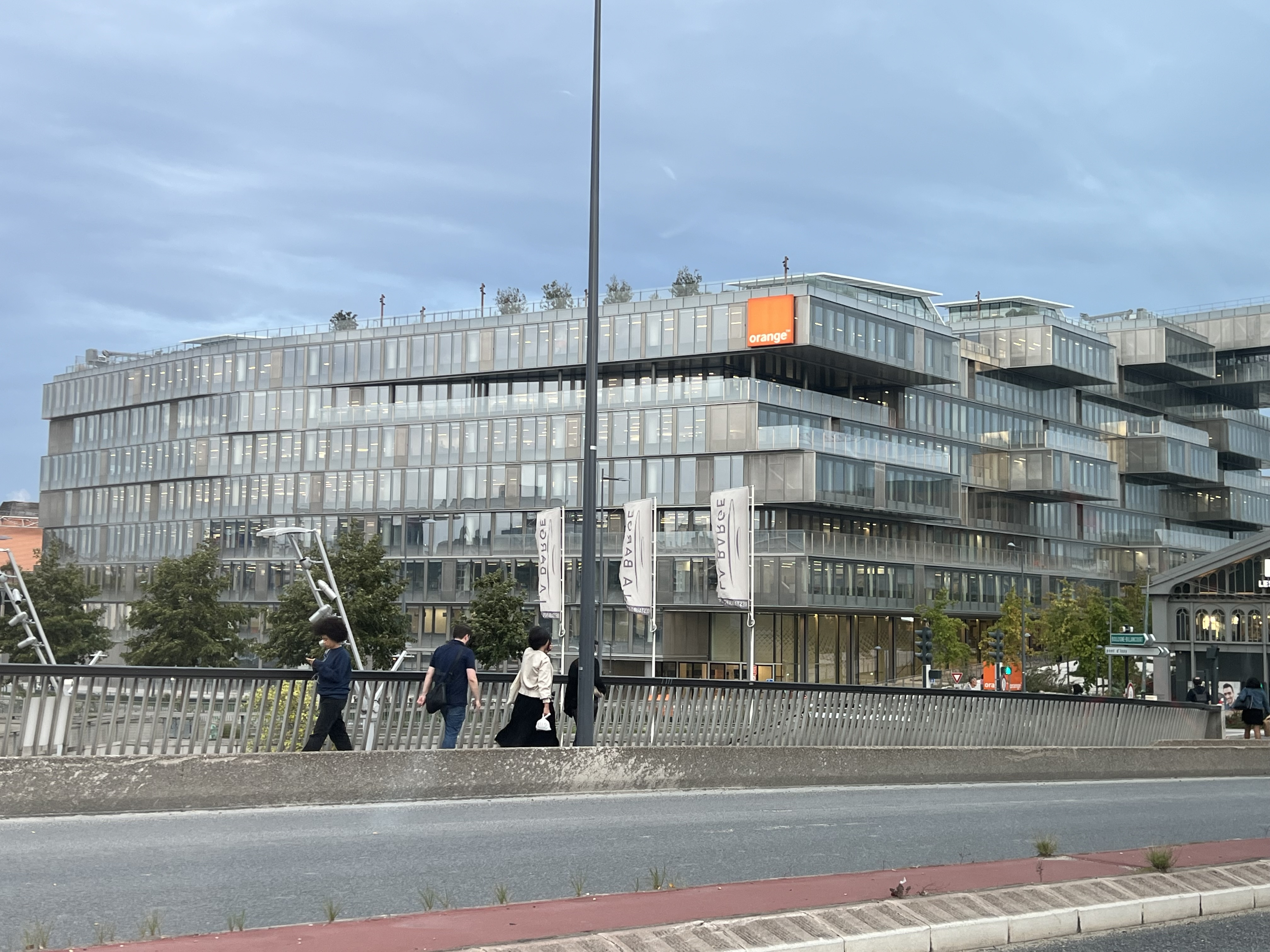
- Headquarters in Issy-les-Moulineaux, France
- Trade name: Orange S.A. (2013–present)
- Formerly: France Télécom S.A. (1988–2013)
- Type: Public
- Traded as: Euronext Paris: ORA; NYSE: ORAN (former); BIT: 1ORA (former); CAC 40 Component
- Industry: Telecommunications
- Predecessor: Postes, Télégraphes et Téléphones
- Founded: 1 January 1988; 38 years ago
- Headquarters: Issy-les-Moulineaux, Île-de-France, France
- Area served: Worldwide
- Key people: Christel Heydemann (CEO); Jacques Aschenbroich (chairman)
- Products: Fixed line telephone; Mobile phone; Broadband; IPTV; Internet; Banking
- Revenue: ▲€40.40 billion (2025)
- Operating income: ▼€3.42 billion (2025)
- Net income: ▼€1.14 billion (2025)
- Total assets: ▲€107.41 billion (2025)
- Total equity: ▼€33.15 billion (2025)
- Owners: APE (Government of France) (23%)
- Number of employees: 116,734 (2025)
- Subsidiaries: Orange Business; Orange Marine; Orange Labs; Orange Belgium (68.42%); Orange Luxembourg; Orange Slovensko; Orange Polska (50.67%); Orange Romania; Orange Moldova; Orange España; Orange Jordan; Orange Egypt; Orange Tunisie; Orange Maroc; Orange Mali; Orange Burkina Faso; Orange Côte d'Ivoire; Orange Liberia; Orange Sierra Leone; Orange Guinée; Orange Bissau; Orange SN (42.33%); Orange Cameroun; Orange RDC; Orange Centrafrique; Orange Réunion; Orange Madagascar; Orange Botswana; Globecast
- ASN: 5511
- Website: orange.com (group); orange.fr

Orange S.A. (French pronunciation: [ɔʁɑ̃ʒ]; formerly known as France Télécom S.A., stylised as france télécom) is a French multinational telecommunications corporation founded in 1988 and headquartered in Issy-les-Moulineaux, near Paris.

Orange has been the corporation's main brand for mobile, landline, internet and Internet Protocol television (IPTV) services since 2006. It traces its origins back to Hutchison Whampoa acquiring a controlling stake in Microtel Communications in 1994 in the United Kingdom. Microtel Communications became a subsidiary of Mannesmann in 1999 and then was acquired by France Télécom in 2000. The former French public telecoms monopoly thus became internationalized following this takeover and has pursued an expansionist policy since. The group now operates in many countries in Europe, Africa and in the French West Indies. Since February 2012, as a result of the company's decision to transfer its fixed-line telephony operations to its Orange brand, all offers marketed by France Télécom are Orange-branded; and on 1 July 2013, France Télécom itself was rebranded Orange S.A.. In 2019, Orange S.A. employed nearly 148,000 people worldwide, including 88,000 in France.

The corporation has throughout the years expanded its activities to include content sales (music, cinema, downloads, etc.), e-commerce, online advertising, M2M, home automation and remote assistance solutions. In 2023, it generated over €43 billion in revenue across all its businesses.

== History ==
=== Nationalised service (1878–1980s) ===
In 1792, under the French Revolution, the first communication network was developed to enable the rapid transmission of information in a warring and unsafe country. That was the optical telegraphy network of Claude Chappe.

In 1878, after the invention of the electrical telegraph and then the invention of the telephone, the French State created a Ministry of Posts and Telegraphs. Telephone services were nationalised and added to the ministry in 1889. However, it was not until 1923 that the second 'T' (for 'telephones') appeared and the department of P&T (Posts and Telegraphs) became PTT.

In 1941, a General Direction of Telecommunications was created within this ministry. Then, in 1944, the National Centre of Telecommunications Studies (CNET) was created to develop the telecommunications industry in France.

In the 1970s, France attempted to make up for its delay in developing communications infrastructure, compared to other countries, by launching the programme "Delta LP" (increasing the main lines). It was at that time that the majority of the local loop was built (that is all the cables linking the users to the operator). Moreover, with the help of French manufacturers, digital switching -- Minitel and the GSM standard—were invented by engineers and CNET researchers.

In 1982, Telecom introduced Minitel online ordering for its customers.

=== Creation of France Télécom (1988–1997) ===
Until 1988, France Télécom was known as the direction générale des Télécommunications, a division of the Ministry of Posts and Telecommunications. It became autonomous in 1990. This was in response to a European directive, aimed at making competition mandatory in public services from 1 January 1998. The 2 July 1990 Bill changed France Télécom into an operator of public law, with Marcel Roulet as the first chairman. Since then, the company has had a separate body corporate from the State and acquired financial autonomy. It was privatised by Lionel Jospin's Plural Left government starting on 1 January 1998. The French government, both directly and through its holding company ERAP, continues to hold a stake of almost 27% in the company. In addition, the French government has a role in naming the CEO. In September 1995, Michel Bon was appointed to run France Télécom Group.

=== 'Roaring Nineties' (1997–2000) ===
Logo as of 1998

Logo as of 1999

In 1997, the capital of the new public company was successfully floated whereas the dot-com bubble phenomenon made the stock exchanges bullish. A second share offering occurred in 1998. France Télécom got behind in the internationalisation launched by its international competitors such as Vodafone, thus, it started looking for targets at the highest speculation rate of the dot-com bubble. Moreover, its alliance with Deutsche Telekom based on a reciprocal capital contribution of 2% broke off when Deutsche Telekom announced that they were planning to do business with Telecom Italia without letting the French know; even if this project ended up failing.

=== Acquisition of Orange and privatisation ===
In July 1991, Hutchison Telecom, a UK subsidiary of the Hong Kong-based conglomerate Hutchison Whampoa, acquired a controlling stake in Microtel Communications Ltd, which by then had acquired a licence to develop a mobile network in the United Kingdom. Hutchison renamed Microtel to Orange Personal Communications Services Ltd, and on 28 April 1994 the Orange brand was launched in the UK mobile phone market. A holding company structure was adopted in 1995 with the establishment of Orange plc. In April 1996, Orange went public and floated on the London Stock Exchange and NASDAQ, majority-owned by Hutchison (48.22%), followed by BAe (21.1%). In June 1996, it became the youngest company to enter the FTSE 100, valued at £2.4 billion.

In October 1999, the German conglomerate Mannesmann AG acquired Orange for a price equivalent to €7,900 per customer, i.e. US$33 billion. Mannesmann's acquisition of Orange triggered Vodafone to make a hostile takeover bid for Mannesmann. Shortly thereafter, in February 2000, Vodafone acquired Mannesmann for US$183 billion, and decided to divest Orange because EU regulations would not allow it to hold two mobile licences.

In August 2000, France Télécom bought Orange plc from Vodafone for a total estimated cost of €39.7 billion. At the time, France Télécom also bought stakes in several other international firms (GlobalOne, Equant, Internet Telecom, Freeserve, EresMas, NTL and Mobilcom), of which some have since been sold back. Through this process, France Télécom became the fourth-biggest global operator. The mobile telephone operations of Orange plc were merged with the majority of the mobile operations of France Télécom, forming the new group Orange S.A.

On 13 February 2001, Orange S.A. was listed on the Euronext Paris stock exchange with an initial public offering of €95 per share, with a secondary listing in London. In May 2001, Orange S.A. was listed on the CAC 40, the benchmark stock market index of the top 40 French companies in terms of market capitalisation.

In June 2001, the France Telecom Mobile brands Itinéris, OLA, and Mobicarte were replaced by the Orange brand. On 21 November 2003, France Telecom withdrew the 13.7% of Orange's shares traded on the Paris stock exchange.

On 2 October 2002, the CEO, Thierry Breton was given the task of turning the company around after the company became crippled by debt following the drop of the company's stock price. On 30 September 2002, the company's stock price was €6.94, down from €219 on 2 March 2000. France Télécom was the second most indebted company worldwide in terms of short-term liabilities. The company obtained €15 billion of debt adjustment that needed to be borne by banks and investors, another €15 billion as a capital increase from the French State since it was still the majority shareholder, and an additional 15bn in cash from internal savings. On 25 February 2005, Thierry Breton was appointed Minister of Finance and Industry and Didier Lombard, who had been head of the firm's new technologies division, replaced him as CEO.

=== NeXT scheme and rebranding to Orange (2006–present) ===
Logo of France Télécom from 2006 until 2013

The NeXT scheme was the recovery plan for France Télécom which aimed at, among other things, reducing costs, especially wage costs, carrying on a converging policy for its products and services, and grouping together all the brands under a single brand, except for the activities dealing with fixed-line telephone which would stay under the designation 'France Télécom'. Consequently, this led to the disappearance of a number of brands.

From 1 June 2006, France Télécom tried to commercialise all its products under a single worldwide brand, becoming the sole brand of the France Telecom group for Internet, television and mobile services in the majority of countries in which Orange operated. Orange Business Services became the brand for all its business services offerings worldwide, replacing the Equant brand. In June 2007, Orange and Mid Europa Partners acquired Austrian mobile network company One, re-branding it as Orange Austria. In 2012, it was sold to Hutchison 3G and the Orange Austria brand was terminated.

In November 2008, Orange launched five Orange Cinema Series channels. To do so, Orange bought the exclusive rights from Warner Bros. for first runs of all new films, previously held by TPS Star (a subsidiary of the Canal+ Group), as well as all films in its catalogue and rights to the film catalogues of Gaumont, HBO and MGM. Orange also secured exclusive rights to broadcast Saturday evening Ligue 1 football matches from the French Football Federation. Free accused Orange of tied-selling as the Orange channels were only available to its subscribers. In June 2008, the firm abandoned a €27 billion bid for Swedish operator TeliaSonera after the two companies failed to agree terms.

In 2008, Orange was given permission from Apple to sell the iPhone in Austria, Belgium, the Dominican Republic, Egypt, Jordan, Poland, Portugal, Romania, Slovakia, Switzerland and Orange's African markets. On 8 September 2009, Orange and T-Mobile parent Deutsche Telekom announced they were in advanced talks to merge their UK operations to create the largest mobile operator with 37% of the market. Both T-Mobile and Orange brands were kept due to differences in their targeted markets. T-Mobile remained the budget-conscious offering and Orange the premium one, although there was some overlap as of February 2011.

On 5 April 2009, Orange won an Arbitration Court case against Orascom Telecom, forcing Orascom to transfer its stake in Mobinil to Orange at a price of E£441,658 per Mobinil share. On 28 October 2009, Orange changed the name of its Luxembourgish telecommunication company VOXMobile to Orange. On 5 November 2009, Orange Armenia launched telecommunication services in Armenia. On 11 December 2009, Egypt's regulator approved an offer from a unit of France Telecom (Orange) to buy Mobinil. In 2010, Orange's CEO, Didier Lombard, was replaced by Stéphane Richard. The company was also reorganised internally, most notably with the arrival of former Culture Minister Christine Albanel as head of communications for the group. In mid-April 2010, Orange UK announced that it would outsource the management of its broadband network to BT. This announcement was greeted positively by broadband commentators, who felt that the move was likely to improve Orange's broadband quality and customer services.

On 2 March 2012, Didier Lombard, who remained special advisor to Stéphane Richard, left the company. His departure was shadowed by controversy over his stock options: he was suspected of having stayed with the company longer to wait for the France Telecom share to recover and then exercise his stock option. The share was trading at around €16, whereas his stock options were at €23. On 3 February 2012, Hutchison Whampoa announced that it would buy Orange Austria for US$1.7 billion. The deal closed on 3 January 2013, and the Orange brand was phased out on 19 August 2013, when its operations were merged into 3. In March 2012, France Télécom bought 93.9% of Mobinil, an Egyptian mobile operator, from Naguib Sawiris's Orascom Telecom Media and Technology (OTMT) in an effort to double its revenue in MENA by 2015. On 28 May 2013 at the Annual Shareholders' Meeting, shareholders approved changing the name of the group to Orange S.A. This became effective on 1 July 2013. In September 2014, Orange agreed a deal to acquire Spanish firm Jazztel for a fee of around €3.4 billion.

As of October 2018, Orange has teamed up with Google in order to install a transatlantic undersea cable, Dunant, to share data between the United States and France at faster speeds. Planned to begin operation in 2020, the fibre-based cable has a design capacity of 250 terabits per second (Tbit/s) and will span approximately 6600 kilometres in length.

In July 2020, Orange launched a satellite-based home broadband service utilising the Eutelsat Konnect satellite.

== Shareholders ==
The major shareholders of Orange as of 31 December 2015 are the state of France through Agence des participations de l'État and Banque publique d'investissement (replacing Fonds stratégique d'investissement) for 23.04%. As of mid-2013, Orange employees owned 4.81%, and the company itself owned 0.58%.

== Operations ==
=== Mobile ===
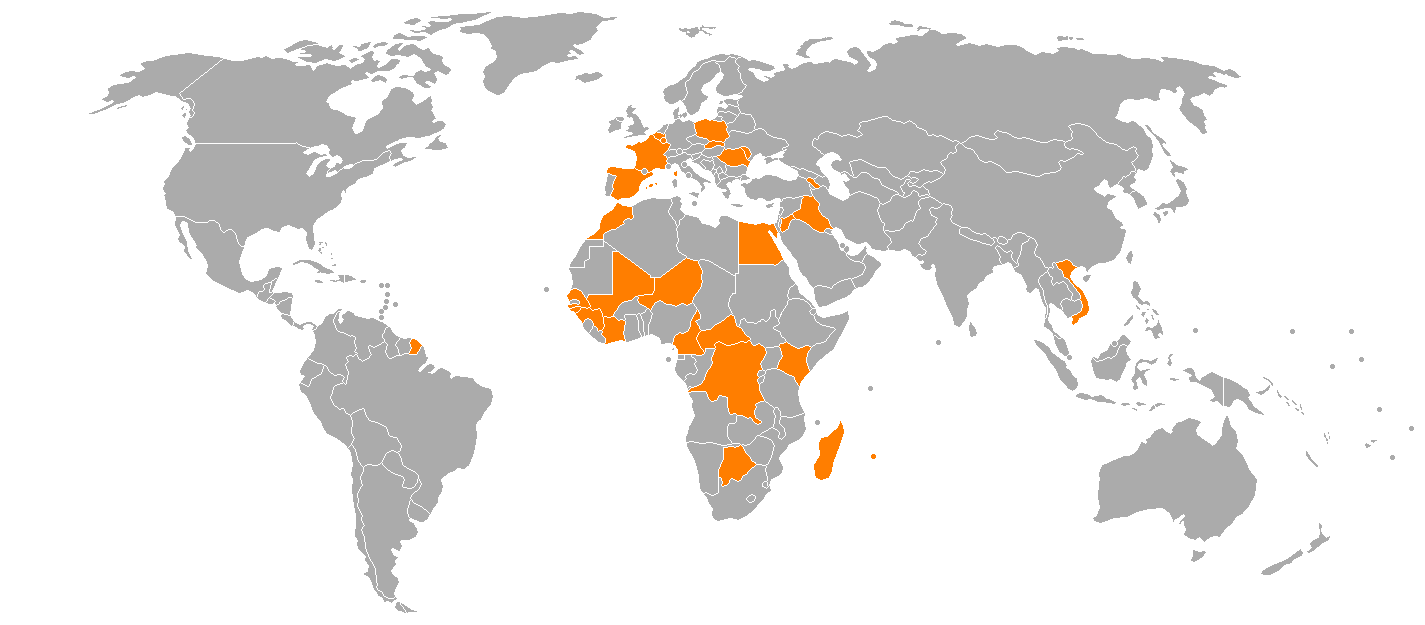
Orange world activities

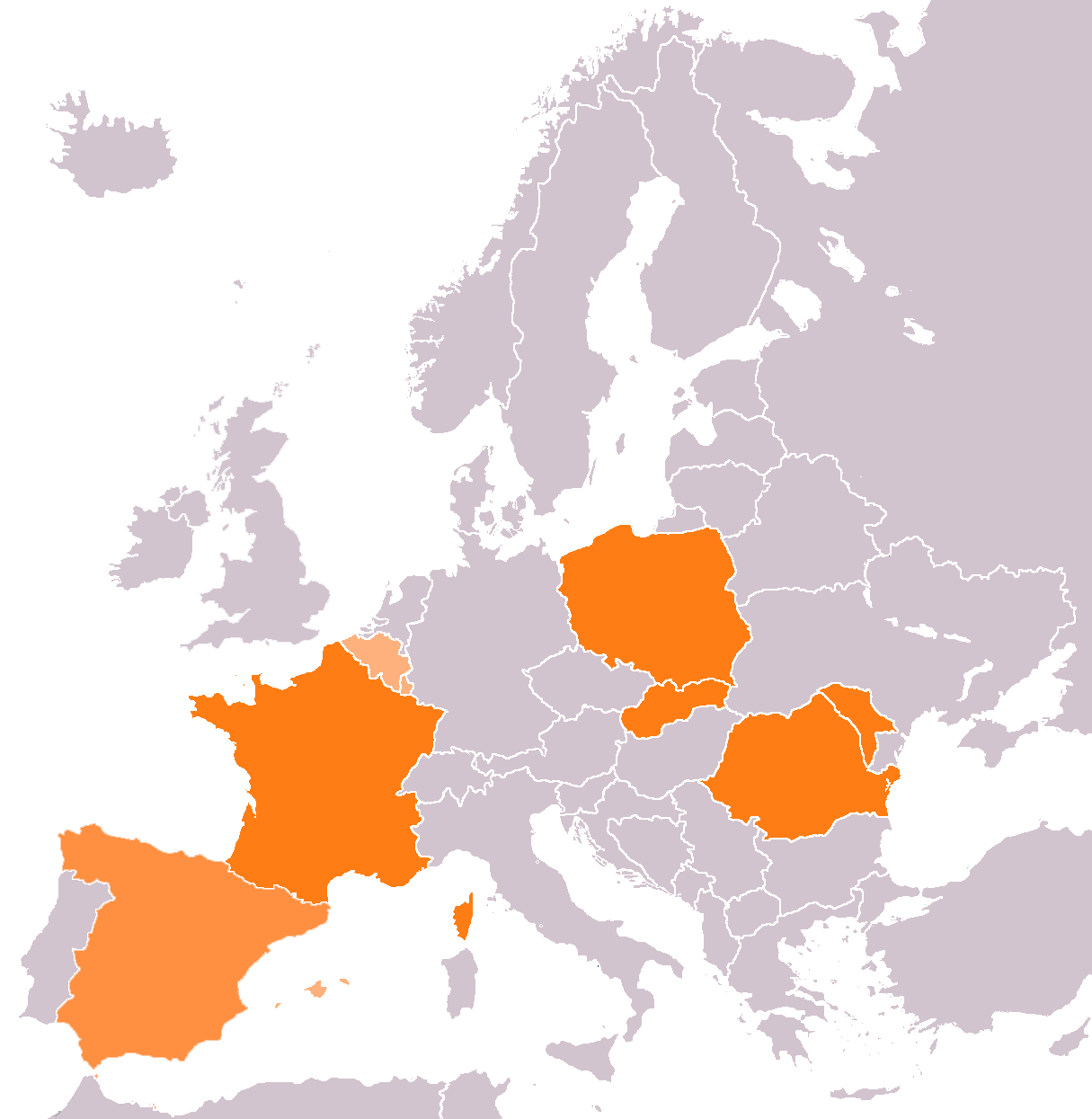
Mobile network locations in Europe: France, Moldova, Romania, Slovakia and Poland: leading mobile telephone business. Belgium, Luxembourg and Spain: ranked 2nd in mobile telephony.

Orange is the sole brand used in the marketing of the company's mobile offers; the Itineris, Ola and Mobicarte brands have been combined since 2001, and Mobicarte became a special prepaid calling offer. As of 31 December 2010, Orange has 150 million mobile customers worldwide, 17.9% of whom are in France. Orange France is the leading mobile telecommunications operator in France, with a market share of 45.38% as of 2 November 2009.

Country	Operator	Website
France (headquarters)	Orange	orange.fr
Belgium	Orange	orange.be
Botswana	Orange	orange.co.bw
Burkina Faso	Orange	orange.bf
Cameroon	Orange	orange.cm
Central African Republic	Orange	orange.cf
Democratic Republic of the Congo	Orange	orange.cd
Egypt	Orange	orange.eg
Guinea	Orange (Group Sonatel)	orange-guinee.com
Guinea-Bissau	Orange	orange-bissau.com
Ivory Coast	Orange	orange.ci
Jordan	Orange	orange.jo
Liberia	Orange	orange.com.lr
Luxembourg	Orange	orange.lu
Madagascar	Orange	orange.mg
Mali	Orange (Group Sonatel)	orange.ml
Moldova	Orange	orange.md
Morocco	Orange	orange.ma
Poland	Orange	orange.pl
Réunion	Orange	orange.re
Romania	Orange	orange.ro
Senegal	Orange (Group Sonatel)	orange.sn
Sierra Leone	Orange (Group Sonatel)	orange.sl
Slovakia	Orange	orange.sk
Spain	Orange	orange.es
Tunisia	Orange	orange.tn

The Orange brand name was previously licensed to a number of operators which Orange S.A. did not own. These include:

Country	Former operator	Rebranding/ License cancellation	Present operator	Website
Hong Kong	Orange	June 2004	3 Hong Kong	three.com.hk
Thailand	TA Orange	January 2006	TrueMove H	true.th
India	Orange	January 2006	Vodafone Idea	myvi.in
Austria	Orange	August 2013	3	drei.at
United Kingdom	Orange	February 2015	EE	ee.co.uk
Liechtenstein	Orange	April 2015	7acht	7acht.li
Switzerland	Orange	April 2015	Salt	salt.ch
Armenia	Orange	December 2015	Ucom	ucom.am
Israel	Orange	February 2016	Partner	partner.co.il
Mauritius	Orange	November 2017	My.T	myt.mu
Dominican Republic	Orange	November 2017	Altice	altice.com.do
Equatorial Guinea	Orange	October 2018	Getesa	getesa.gq

=== Landline and Internet ===
Orange took over the landline and Internet businesses of France Telecom and Wanadoo in 2006. Since then, Orange is the sole brand of France Telecom for landline and Internet services worldwide, with a few exceptions, such as Mobistar in Belgium and TPSA in Poland. Orange's triple-play broadband Internet offers are supplied through the Livebox. As of 31 December 2010, Orange has 13.7 million broadband ADSL customers worldwide, 67% of whom are in France40.

The Livebox is the ADSL modem supplied to Orange's ADSL and FTTH customers in France, the United Kingdom, the Netherlands, Switzerland, Spain and Tunisia, and to WiMAX customers in Cameroon. It serves as a bridge between the Internet access and the home network through several communication interfaces (Bluetooth, Ethernet, Wi-Fi). The Livebox has evolved over time. The Livebox 1.0 was replaced by version 1.1, the Mini Livebox, followed by the Livebox 2.0. The newest version was scheduled to be rolled out in 2012. The Livebox is offered on a monthly contract for €3 per month or for purchase for €59. The Number of Liveboxes rented in 2008,this statistic reflects Orange's significant market penetration and growth in the broadband internet sector. With 7.3 million Liveboxes rented out, Orange experienced a notable 12.3% increase in just one year.

=== Broadcasting ===
Beginning in 2003, Orange's strategy has centred on the acquisition, creation and diffusion of content. This starts with the creation of MaLigne.tv in 2003, later renamed Orange TV, an ADSL television access service and a video-on-demand service. In 2004, Orange organised a television access service for mobile phones. In 2007, Orange created Studio 37 and, in 2008, entered into a partnership with France Televisions to broadcast pre-recorded programming from the public national television and to roll out themed channels for sports, cinema and television series. Orange dubbed the strategy Content Everywhere in 2008, announcing it simultaneously with the launch of the Orange cinema series television channels and aimed to offer customers access to all content available through Orange's services, anywhere and from any device.

In Spain, Orange TV's football subscription packages include all matches from La Liga and the Segunda División for the 2026–27 season. Its separate Orange TV Libre streaming service offers a selection of one La Liga match and three Segunda División matches per matchweek.

==== OCS ====
Orange Cinema Series is launched 13 November 2008, along with Orange Sport; it comprises five channels devoted to movies (Orange Ciné Max, Ciné Happy, Ciné Choc, Ciné Novo, Ciné Géant). The channels primarily show films from the Warner Bros. and HBO catalogues. Orange installs additional VOD services on its channels, allowing viewers to watch programmes broadcast in the previous 30 days whenever they like, as well as supplementary programmes from the previous month.

==== Orange Sport ====
Orange Sport is launched 13 November 2008. Orange secures the broadcast rights for the Saturday evening line-up of Ligue 1 matches from season 2008/2009 to season 2011/2012, and the rights to home matches of eight Serie A clubs (Sampdoria, Atalanta, Chievo, Reggina, Siena, Palermo, Udinese and Napoli). The acquisition of these rights marks the start of competition for sports programs with the Canal+ group.

==== Video on demand ====
Orange offers services for video on demand access using the Orange decoder, a computer or a mobile phone. Orange offers free programming from the catalogues of available works of France Television, M6 and TF1 for one week after their initial broadcast.

==== Online entertainment ====
In 1997, France Telecom created Goa, an online entertainment subsidiary. The site is launched as a platform for players of massively multiplayer online games. In 2002, Goa acquires the operating license for Dark Age of Camelot. In 2007 Goa ceases to be a subsidiary and is merged into Orange. In 2009 Orange refocuses Goa.com on online entertainment and gradually ceases to operate massively multiplayer online games. In August 2010, goa.com disappears to become the Orange Jeux portal.

=== Music ===
Liveradio: Created by Orange in 2008, Liveradio is a free, live, on-demand IP radio streaming service. Users gain access through this service to more than 10,000 FM and web radio stations and 11,000 podcasts from 100 countries.

== Subsidiaries, joint ventures and holdings ==
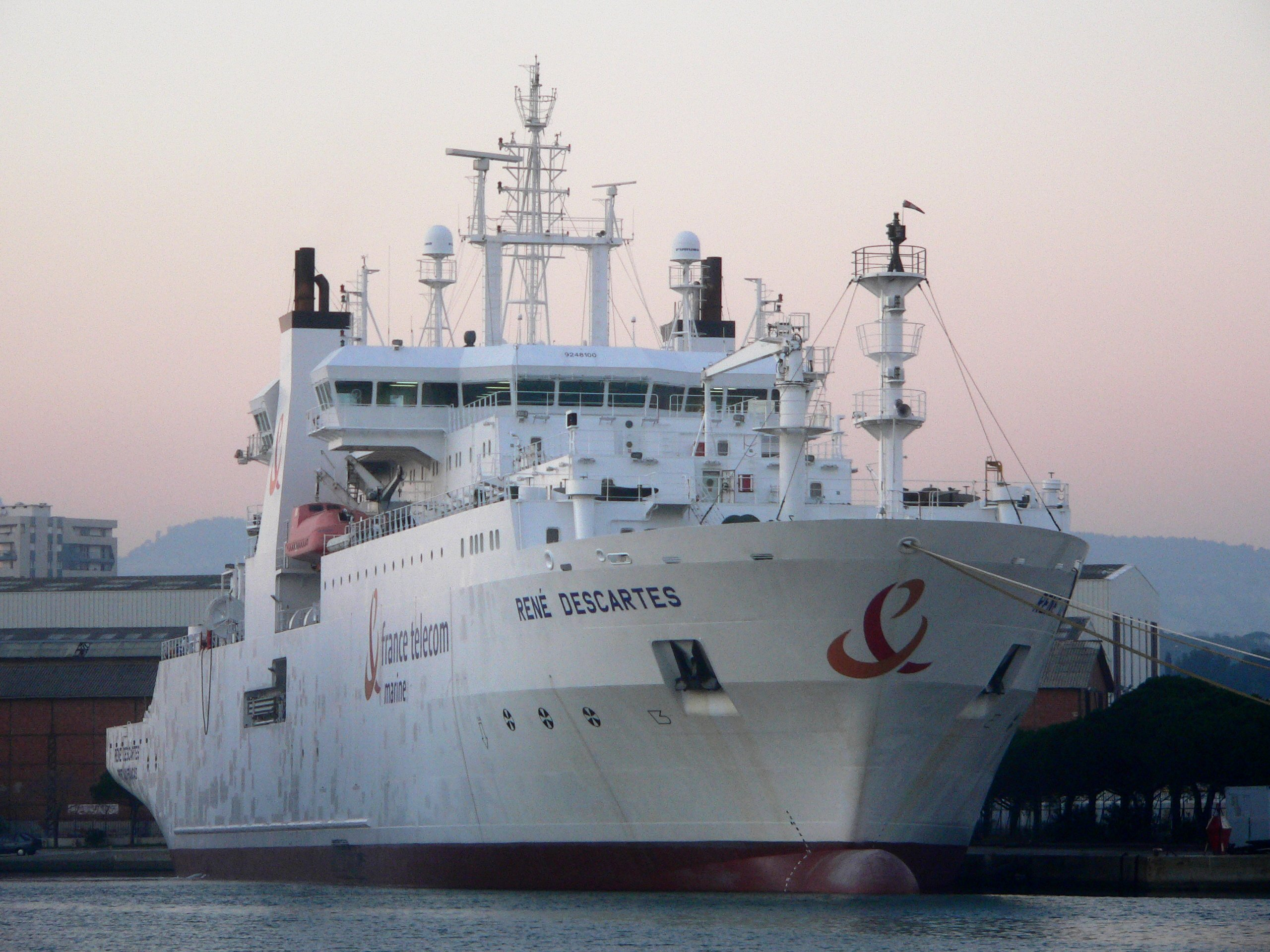
Orange Marine operates cable-laying ships.

Orange is a communications access provider offering customers access through multiple platforms. The four key platforms Orange operates are:

1. fixed line telephone, mainly in France and Poland.
2. broadband access.
3. mobile phone telephony.
4. most recently, IPTV, though currently only in France, Spain, Poland and Slovakia, known as Orange TV.

France Télécom merged the different internal divisions managing each platform and now all operate under the Orange brand.

=== Orange Business ===
Orange is present in the U.S. through its Orange Business division and its venture capital historical partner Innovacom as well as two R&D labs: one in Boston, Massachusetts and the other in South San Francisco, California.

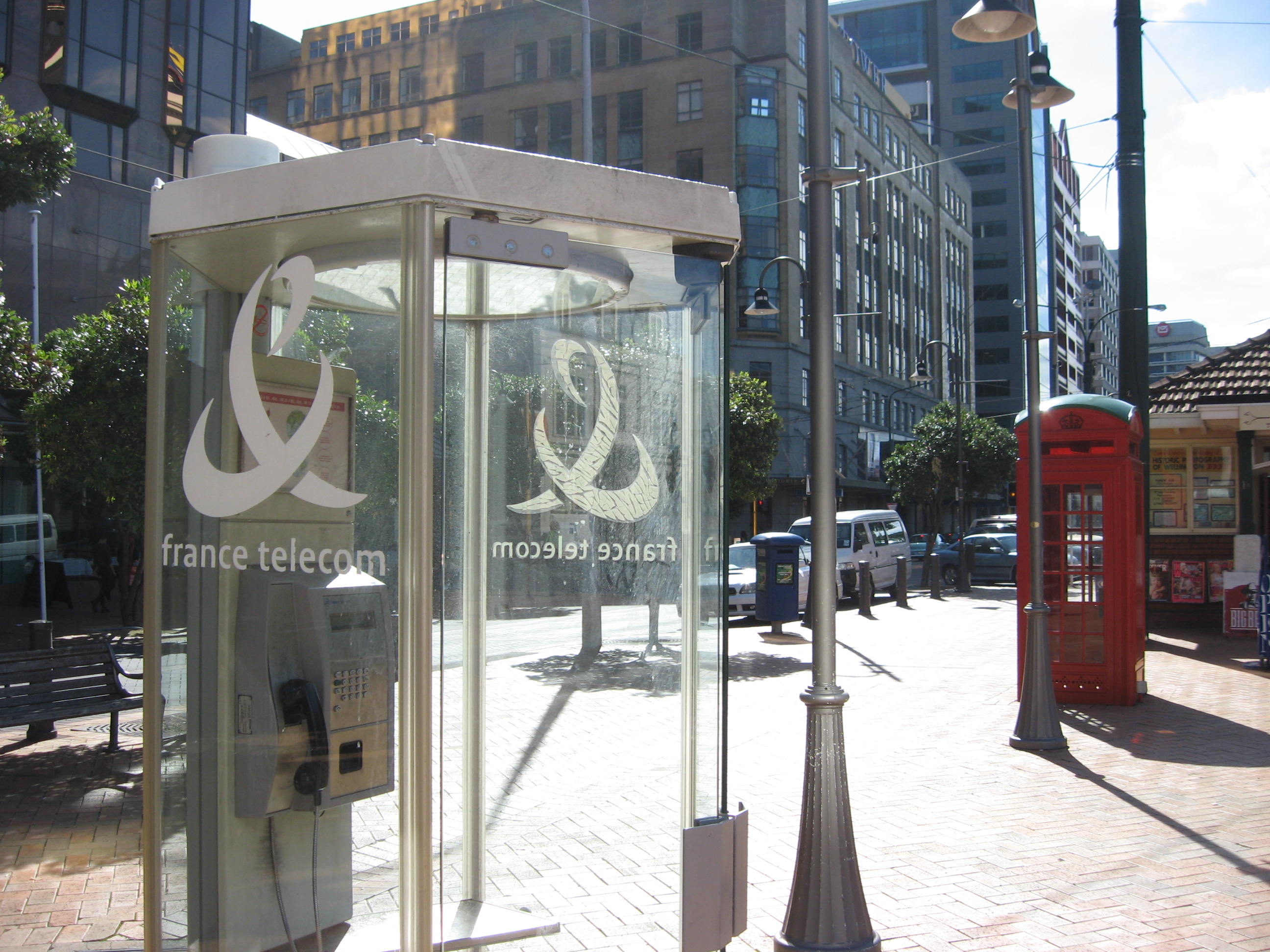
As a result of deregulation, Orange operates phone booths in Wellington, New Zealand.

OpenTransit is Orange's backbone network. It covers Europe, the United States, Japan, Hong Kong, and loops back to Paris.

=== BT Group ===
Orange and Deutsche Telekom merged their UK businesses in 2010 to form a joint venture branded as EE. In December 2014, Orange were in talks with BT Group regarding the acquisition of EE for an estimated £12.5 billion. On 5 February 2015, it was announced that BT would be acquiring EE in a £12.5 billion deal, in which Orange S.A would take a 4% stake in the BT Group. The acquisition of EE was completed on 29 January 2016.

=== Globecast ===
Globecast is a provider of managed services for the media and broadcast industry, such as TV channel distribution via satellite and Internet, live event production, contribution and distribution services, channel content preparation and playout. GlobeCast World TV was a brand by Globecast for its north-American direct-to-home satellite broadcast of international channels. In 2012, Globecast also began launching a direct-to-consumer OTT IPTV service called MyGlobeTV in the United States using NetGem set top boxes. The MyGlobeTV service was discontinued In December 2013.

=== Viaccess Orca ===
Viaccess Orca is a provider of IPTV and OTT TV service platforms and security services. It is headquartered in Paris La Defense. Viaccess-orca acquired Squadeo company in 2017 and is able to supply video secured player. Viaccess Orca is also involved in content tracking over internet, providing anti-piracy services.

=== Orange Labs ===
Orange Labs (formerly France Télécom R&D) is the research and development division of Orange. This division was derived from different previous entities, such as CNET (Centre national d'études des télécommunications) created in 1944, the CCETT created in 1972, as well as other entities. In 2007, France Télécom R&D became known as Orange Labs, a global network of R&D entities.

CCETT/France Télécom R&D contributed to various international standards, such as ISO/IEC MPEG and JPEG standards or DAB and DVB standards. CCETT, IRT and Philips developed a digital audio two-channel compression system known as Musicam or MPEG Audio Layer II (Emmy Award in Engineering 2000).

In 2010, Orange devoted 1.9% of its revenue, or €845 million, to research and development. Since January 2007 Orange has unified its research laboratories and technocentres in the Orange Labs network. As of 31 December 2010 Orange held a portfolio of 7,892 patents, 327 which were filed in 2010. Orange employs 3,700 people in research and development per year throughout the organisation, including more than 200 doctoral candidates and post-doctorates. Orange's research and development is based on partnerships with industry, suppliers and operators, universities and schools, academic institutes and research programs such as the following:

Partner	Type
China Telecom	Supplier and operator
Deutsche Telekom	Supplier and operator
Bibliothèque nationale de France	Academic institute
CNRS	Academic institute
INRIA	Academic institute
Supélec	University/School
IMT Atlantique	University/School
École Normale Supérieure	University/School
ESSEC - Chaire Media & Entertainment	University/School
École Normale Supérieure - chaire de cryptologie	University/School
Paris Descartes University - chaire pluridisciplinaire	University/School
École polytechnique - chaire Innovation et Régulation	University/School
Massachusetts Institute of Technology	University/School
Beijing University of Post and Telecom	University/School
Imperial College London	University/School
Agence Nationale de la Recherche	Research program

Two types of infrastructure coexist in Orange's research and development: the research laboratories and the technocentres. The latter are responsible for Orange innovations and consist of multidisciplinary teams of researchers, engineers, and marketing and sales personnel.

Type	City	Country
Technocentre	Chatillon	France
Technocentre	London	United Kingdom
Technocentre	Warsaw	Poland
Technocentre	Amman	Jordan
R&D	-	Spain
R&D	San Francisco	United States
R&D	Beijing	China
R&D	Cairo	Egypt
R&D	Tokyo	Japan
R&D	Issy les Moulineaux	France
R&D	Caen	France
R&D	Grenoble	France
R&D	Rennes	France
R&D	Lannion	France
R&D	Sophia Antipolis	France
R&D	La Turbie	France
R&D	Belfort	France

=== Cityvox ===
Cityvox is a network of websites with local content (restaurants, cultural happenings, etc.) created in 1999. Orange purchased the network site in 2008.

=== Deezer ===
In late August 2010 Orange acquired an 11% share in the streaming site Deezer. With this acquisition, the operator offered its subscribers a new "Deezer Premium" option: paid streaming music service with no advertising and 7 million titles. In 2016 Orange sold Deezer to Access Industries, the parent of Warner Music Group.

=== Dailymotion ===
On 25 January 2011 Orange announced the acquisition of 49% of Dailymotion, a French online video platform, at a cost of €58.8 million. The group also secured an option to acquire all of the shares in the platform in 2013. This is indicative of a new strategy by Orange, which seeks to offer a full range of multi-screen video to its subscribers. In 2015 Vivendi acquired 90% of Dailymotion.

=== Orange Studio ===
Created in 2007 under the name Studio 37, Orange Studio co-produces films, acquires film rights for sales abroad, and distributes select films in France. The producer Frédérique Dumas started the studio, which had an initial budget of 30 million Euros. For its growth, Orange negotiated exclusivity agreements with Warner, HBO, Fidélité Films and Gaumont, ensuring a stream of films for its TV Orange Cinema Series package. In 2011, Studio 37 co-produced The Artist which went on to win best picture and four further awards at the 84th Academy Awards. This makes it the first silent film to win an award since the original ceremony in 1929.

In 2013, Studio 37 was renamed Orange Studio.

=== Cloudwatt ===
Cloudwatt is a cloud services provider set up in 2012 by Orange (44%), the French government through Caisse des Dépôts (33%) and Thales (22%). In March 2015, Orange acquired all remaining shares of Cloudwatt to strengthen its enterprise cloud services offering.

=== Aire ===
In January 2019 Orange acquired a minority shareholding in Aire Labs, a credit data platform in the UK.

=== SecureData ===
In February 2019 Orange acquired UK cybersecurity provider SecureData for an undisclosed sum, merging it with Orange Cyberdefense Division.

=== SecureLink ===
Orange acquired SecureLink, a Netherlands-based cybersecurity company, in 2019 for €515 million.

=== SUMA Movil ===
In November 2019 Orange España, a subsidiary of Orange, acquired SUMA Móvil Spain from Grupo-Ingenium for an undisclosed sum.

=== Telekom Romania ===
In early August 2020 Orange reached an agreement with the Ministry of Communications and Information Society (MCSI) to purchase Telekom Romania and establish a new telecommunications entity. As part of this agreement, the Romanian government would own a 20% stake in the new entity, and Orange would take over fixed operations. The MCSI had first entered talks to sell Telekom Romania in September 2019, when Deutsche Telekom announced that it was prepared to sell its stake in Telekom Romania to Orange.

=== Future4care ===
In June 2021, Orange partners with Sanofi, Capgemini and Generali to launch Future4care. This all-European start-up accelerator will help develop upcoming companies focused on digital health.

=== OpenAI ===
In November 2024, Orange announced its multi-year partnership with OpenAI in Europe which will give the French Telecoms access to the pre-release AI models. Orange signed an agreement with both Meta and OpenAI for the purposes of translating regional African languages for the telecom groups.

== Controversies ==
=== Staff suicides ===
Between January 2008 and April 2011, more than 60 France Télécom employees died by suicide, some leaving notes blaming stress and misery at work. In October 2009, the wave of suicides led then Deputy CEO Louis-Pierre Wenes to resign under trade union pressure, to be replaced by Stéphane Richard. Faced with multiple suicides of employees, the company promoted Stéphane Richard to the chief executive officer on 1 February 2010, while Didier Lombard remained as chairman.

The suicide rate among France Télécom's 102,000 domestic employees was 15.3 per year in that year, compared with an average of 14.7 suicides per 100,000 in the overall French population.

Following an investigation, the Inspection du travail (Labour Inspection) told the labour union Sud-PTT that the work organisation at France Télécom "was conducive to generating suffering at work" and "health risks" for employees. An investigation was conducted by the audit firm Technologia at the request of France Télécom's management. Of the 102,843 employees in the group's parent company, 80,080 responded, i.e. a response rate of 77.9%. The fact-finding report revealed a "very poor general feeling", "strained physical and mental health", and a "tense and even violent working environment" for some categories of personnel. Working conditions were deemed difficult, mainly for personnel in charge of sales and customer interventions.

On 20 December 2019, former CEO Didier Lombard and Orange were found guilty of moral harassment towards their employees.

=== Access to some sites limited ===
In 2011, following complaints by Internet users, Megaupload accused Orange of not providing sufficient connectivity to its site, thus severely limiting throughput from France, an allegation Orange denied.

=== Accusations of false advertising in France ===
In November 2009, three users lodged a complaint against Orange for false advertising concerning its "Unlimited 3G Key" service. These customers criticised the operator for the misleading way in which this service is presented, since it isn't in fact unlimited. While it is true that there is no time limit, the user cannot download more than 1 gigabyte per month, thus limiting browsing. Unaware of this, the three plaintiffs browsed beyond plan limits and had to pay additional fees as a result.

=== Corruption in Tunisia ===
In March 2011, the information website OWNI uncovered a questionable financial deal that enabled the Orange group to acquire a 3G license.

=== Anticompetitive practices in French overseas departments ===
On 28 July 2011, the Competition Authority fined France Télécom €27.6 million for having improperly impeded the development of new competing operators in the French overseas departments (primarily Réunion).

France Télécom used its dominant position, resulting in particular from its former monopoly, to take unfair advantage of its competitors.

The practices identified by the Authority were:

- excessive rate levels
- as operators of the quasi-totality of the telecommunication infrastructure local loops, making use of the data which they have access to, France Télécom has targeted former subscribers who had switched to a competitor, in order to win them back, offering them specific deals.
- margin squeeze on broadband Internet offers
- maintaining call barring services inconsistent with the prior selection of an alternative operator

=== SMS and MMS propagation of 1 January 2011 in France ===
On 1 January 2011, Orange users' SMS and MMS were sent and billed multiple times. The operator agreed to reimburse the excess costs to consumers, explaining that the error came from a "third party operator" (which turned out to be Bouygues Telecom), said not to have sent acknowledgements, which caused the messages to be resent. A computer problem at the Bouygues platform was blamed. During the night of 31 December 2010 to 1 January 2011, more than 930 million text messages were exchanged in France (for the three operators combined), setting a new record compared with the peaks of the previous years.

=== Controversies in UK regarding the quality of service ===
On 21 March 2007 Watchdog, a BBC television series focusing on consumer protection, published the results of a broadband survey they carried out. According to the survey Orange was the worst ISP in the UK. 68% of Orange customers that took part in the survey said they were unsatisfied with Orange's customer service, it was voted as the most unreliable broadband provider, and it had the highest number of dissatisfied customers. Two thirds of Orange customers experienced problems cancelling their Orange broadband.

In response to the problems with Orange UK broadband and 3G broadband during March 2009 and April 2009 the 3G data network has been upgraded to 3.5G and increased signal coverage. 3G networks for all telecommunication suppliers still struggle to get the throughput that was originally advertised when these networks were announced. The UK Telecoms Regulator has reported on the challenges for all suppliers.

A consumer organisation forum web site known as OrangeProblems.co.uk focuses on the poor level of service provided by Orange Broadband in the UK. Initially set up as WanadooProblems.co.uk, the site focuses on the infamous Orange local loop unbundling and poor customer service but covers a wider range of Orange operations such as lost email, significantly delayed SMTP and outages, suspicions of eavesdropping, et al.

Orange Mobile was criticised during a Channel 4 News investigation for a lack of security, which potentially exposed customer records to fraud.

In August 2007 Orange was criticised for summarily deleting email accounts tied to old Freeserve and Wanadoo 'pay as you go' dial-up accounts with no warning.

In August 2008, after well-publicised problems with iPhone 3G performances, customers compared their download speed and discovered that Orange in France was capping 3G download bandwidth. Orange admitted capping to 384 kbit/s, well below the theoretical 7.2 Mbit/s provided by the iPhone. Orange uncapped 3G and 3G+ by mid-September 2008.

=== Accusations of antisemitism and calls for boycott ===
The French chairman and CEO of the Orange telecommunications company, Stéphane Richard said in Cairo regarding his company operations in Israel, "Believe me, I would cancel the contract tomorrow if I could. We want to end this and to fix this; we don't want it." Later, Orange announced its desire to discontinue use of its popular brand name by its Israeli operator Partner Communications Company. The president of the State of Israel Reuven Rivlin said in response "Just yesterday Israel faced attacks from anti-Israel and anti-Semitic bodies, who have chosen to delegitimise the state of Israel, and to launch rockets at us from the Gaza Strip. We must face these challenges together, right and left," Rivlin said.

Israeli culture minister Miri Regev said, "I call on Jews of France and the world to disconnect from Orange unless Stéphane Richard takes back his words. The time has come for them to understand that Jews in the world and sane voices that oppose anti-Semitism and racism also have power." The statement on the company's website announced in response that "The Orange Group is a telecoms operator and as such its primary concern is to defend and promote the value of its brand in markets in which it is present," the statement began. "The Group does not engage in any kind of political debate under any circumstance." Later, Richard visited Israel to clarify his remarks. He met Israeli PM Benyamin Netanyahu and former president, Shimon Peres. Richard told both Netanyahu and Peres that Orange has not and will not support anti-Israel boycott efforts, and said that its announced decision to abrogate its relationship with Partner was purely commercial and not political.

On 30 June 2015, Orange and Partner announced a change to their 10-year licensing agreement. Orange paid Partner €40 million to add an opt out clause to the contract, with which Partner conducted a market survey which is determine the best course of action moving forward. In the first year only Partner can opt out, with either party being able to opt out in the second year. Regardless of which party opts to exercise the out clause, Orange will pay Partner an additional €50 million to end the arrangement. Orange stated that the money paid to Partner was purely for re-branding purposes and affirmed their previous statement that their wish to leave Israel is based on desire to discontinue license agreements and maintain only subsidiaries that they control, rather than a boycott. Orange would make the relevant payments over the course of two years and charge it to their books as a mix of marketing, sales, customer services and related expenses. As part of the agreement Orange's research and development activities within Israel would transition to the Orange name, but would be restricted from entering the telecommunications services market.

In September 2015, Orange reaffirmed their commitment to Israel with an investment in Hola, a video distribution network.

In February 2016, Orange and Partner decided to terminate their agreement. As a result, Orange Israel has become part of Partner.

=== Conviction for infringement and violation of free licenses ===
In 2024, after twelve years of proceedings, Orange was fined €860,000 for infringement and violation of the GNU general public license, and therefore of the copyright of Entr'ouvert, the cooperative company that authored the free identity management library LASSO. The April association produced several text explanations to comment on the case.

== Governance ==
=== Overview of governance ===
Governance of the Orange group is centered in its board of directors, executive committee and three committees that steer Orange's strategy:

- Audit Committee: Created in 1997, the Audit Committee comprises three members appointed for indefinite terms by the board of directors on the recommendation of the Governance and Corporate Social Responsibility Committee.
- Governance and Corporate Social Responsibility Committee: Created in 2010, it comprises at least three members appointed by the board of directors on the recommendation of its chairman. Its remit is to examine the main risks and opportunities in relation with the environment, Orange's policies concerning industrial, the publication of societal and environmental information, and the main orientations of its corporate social responsibility policy.
- Strategy Committee: Created in 2003, the Strategy Committee comprises at least three members appointed by the board of directors on the recommendation of its chairman. The latter chairs the committee. It examines the group's international development strategic and the strategic mid-term guidelines.

=== Chairmen ===
- 2005: Didier Lombard
- 2010-2021: Stéphane Richard

=== Chief executive officers ===
The company is headed either by the chairman of the board of directors, whose title in that case is the chairman and chief executive officer, or by another person appointed by the board of directors and given the title of chief executive officer.

=== Board of directors ===
The Orange group is governed by a board of directors composed of a minimum of twelve members and a maximum of twenty-two members, divided as follows: three are appointed by the French State, three are elected by the employees, one is elected by the shareholders and represents employee shareholders, the fifteen other members are appointed by the shareholders. The board members serve for a term of four years. In 2011, the board of directors was composed of 15 members:

Name	Position
Christel Heydemann	Chairman and chief executive officer
Luc Marino	Director representing employee shareholders
Sébastien Crozier	Director representing the employees
Fabrice Jolys	Director representing the employees
René Ollier	Director representing the employees
Alexandre Bompard	Independent director
Christel Heydemann	Independent director
Charles-Henri Filippi	Independent director
Bernard Ramanantsoa	Independent director
Helle Kristoffersen	Independent director
Mouna Sepehri	Independent director
Jean-Michel Severino	Independent member
Lucie Muniesa	Director representing the public sector (French State)
Anne Lange	Director representing the public sector (French State)
Bpifrance Participations (representative)	Director representing the public sector (French State)

=== Executive committee ===
The executive committee reports to the chairman and CEO. Its purpose is to coordinate the implementation of Orange's strategic orientations and to oversee the achievement of operational, social, technical and financial resource allocation objectives. It comprises fifteen members.

Name	Title
Stéphane Richard	Chairman and chief executive officer
Ramon Fernandez	Delegate Chief Executive Officer, Finance, Performance and Europe
Gervais Pellissier	Delegate Chief Executive Officer, Group Transformation and Chairman of Orange Business Services
Fabienne Dulac	Deputy Chief Executive Officer, Chief Executive Director of Orange France
Mari-Noëlle Jégo-Laveissière	Deputy Chief Executive Officer, Chief Technology and Innovation Officer
Laurent Paillassot	Deputy Chief Executive Officer, chief executive officer of Orange Spain
Christine Albanel	Senior Executive Vice-president of CSR, Diversity, Partnerships and Philanthropy, Deputy Chair of the Orange Foundation
Jérôme Barré	Chief Executive Officer of Wholesale and International Networks
Hugues Foulon	Executive Director of Strategy and Cybersecurity activities
Nicolas Guérin	Secretary General, Secretary of the Board of Directors
Valérie Le Boulanger	Executive Director in charge of Human Resources
Béatrice Mandine	Executive Director Communications and Brand
Alioune Ndiaye	Chief Executive Officer of Orange Middle East and Africa
Helmut Reisinger	Chief Executive Officer of Orange Business Services
Paul de Leusse	Deputy Chief Executive Officer of Orange for mobile financial services, and chief executive officer of Orange Bank

=== Head office ===
Orange's former head office in Paris at 6, Place d'Alleray

Orange's head office, since 2012, is based at 78, Rue Olivier de Serres in the 15th arrondissement of Paris.

The company's former head office was based at 6, Place d'Alleray in the 15th arrondissement of Paris. The building was the head office from 1998 until 2012. Eight hundred employees worked at the site.

== Orange Foundation ==
In 1987 France Télécom established the France Télécom Foundation. On 16 January 2007, the foundation changed its name to Orange Foundation. In 1990 France Telecom Foundation received the top award for corporate philanthropy from ADMICAL. In 1995 France Telecom Foundation received the top award for solidarity from ADMICAL. The board of directors of Orange Foundation consists of representatives of Orange, independent personalities and employee representatives. Its purpose is to support projects related to health, particularly autism; education, particularly schooling for girls in developing countries; and culture, particularly group vocal music. Projects supported by Orange Foundation are chosen by committees of experts devoted to each major theme. The Foundation has been involved in 300 to 400 projects per year since 1987. The Foundation works with international NGOs and local associations involved in long-term projects in countries in which Orange is based for better follow-up of these projects.

== Sponsorship ==
From 2000 to 2002, Orange was a major sponsor of British Formula One team Arrows.

Orange was the major sponsor for the Essendon Football Club in the Australian Football League for the 2001 and 2002 premiership seasons.

Orange was the sponsor for UEFA Euro 2012 and UEFA Euro 2016.

The company was the official jersey sponsor of the national basketball teams of the Central African Republic and Senegal at the 2015 FIBA Africa Championship.

Orange was the kit sponsor of the French association football club Olympique de Marseille for the 2017/18 and 2018/19 seasons.

The company became a sponsor of esports organisation Team Vitality in 2018.

== Prizes and distinctions ==
In 2021, the application for Orange customers called My Orange was named winner of the "Janus of the digital experience" by the French Institute of Design. In the same year, this application won the "Red Dot" award. In 2023, the demo application of the "Orange Design System" also won this award in the "Brand and Communication Design" category.

== See also ==
- Centre commun d'études de télévision et télécommunications (CCETT), now part of Orange Labs
- Dirigisme
- Karoshi
- List of mobile network operators in Europe
- List of French companies
- Minitel
- The Orange S.A. suicides
