= Didier Lombard =

French businessman

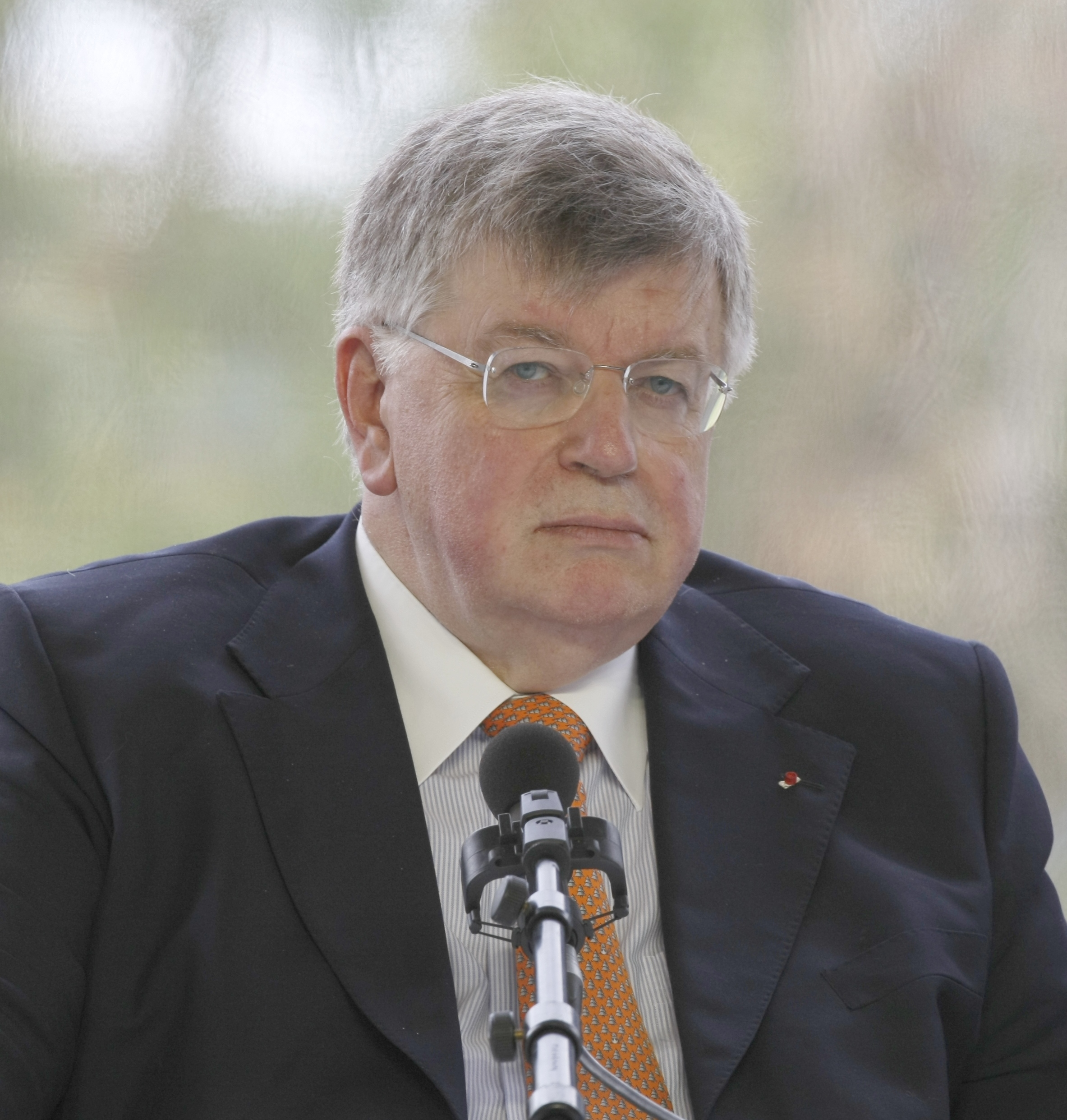
- Lombard in 2009
- Born: 27 February 1942 (age 84); Clermont-Ferrand, France
- Education: École Polytechnique; Télécom ParisTech
- Occupations: Former chairman and CEO of France Télécom

Didier Lombard (born 27 February 1942) is a French businessman. Between February 2005 and March 2010 he was chairman and CEO of France Télécom. In 2010 he resigned as CEO, retaining the chairmanship. Since 2012, he has been under indictment for criminal acts of "moral harassment" (harcèlement moral) for abusive human resource policies during his leadership at France Télécom alleged to have caused a number of suicides, leading to a criminal trial and his conviction in 2019.

== Early life ==
He is a graduate of the École Polytechnique (Promotion X1962) and the Télécom Paris. He is also a doctor of economics and a general engineer of telecommunications.

== Career ==
He began his career in 1967 at the National Center for Telecommunication Studies, where he worked on the development of new products related to satellite and mobile systems. From 1988 to 1990, he became Scientific and Technical Director at the Department of Research and Technology, and then General Director of Industrial Strategies at the Ministry of Economy, Finance and Industry. In 1993 he became director of Bull, in 1997 director of Thomson. At the same time, he holds the post of ambassador for international investment, president of the French Agency for International Investments until 2003, secretary general of the Strategic Council of information technology and vice-chair of the General Council of Information Technology from 2001 to 2003.

=== France Telecom's chairman ===
On 27 February 2005, Didier Lombard succeeded Thierry Breton at the head of France Telecom when Breton became Minister of the Economy. As France Telecom's chairman and chief executive officer, Didier Lombard continued the group reorganization policy initiated by Thierry Breton. The reorganization project presented and implemented by Lombard saw the suppression of 22,000 posts and the mobility of 10,000 workers over three years (2006–2008). This reorganization was done unilaterally, without consultation with the unions; it does not give rise to the conclusion and the implementation of an agreement for the provisional management of jobs and skills, nor to the establishment of a saving jobs plan.

Lombard was indicted in 2012 for his management during the suicide wave of France Télécom employees (more than 60 between 2006 and 2009).

Lombard quit the presidency of the group in February 2011, a few months before the planned end of his term, but he remained on the payroll at France Télécom as a special advisor until he left the firm entirely in March 2011 due to the controversy surrounding him—and his €500,000 annual salary as an advisor. His trial began in May 2019, and in December 2019, he was found guilty and sentenced to one year in prison, of which 8 months suspended and to a €15,000 fine.

=== After France Telecom ===
Lombard assumed the chairmanship of the supervisory board of ST Microelectronics, a French-Italian semiconductor group of which he has been a director since 2004. He also sits on the boards of Thales, Technicolor (formerly Thomson) and Radiall.
