= Orange Business =

French business services corporation

- Formerly: Orange Business Services
- Type: Subsidiary
- Industry: Information technology Consulting
- Predecessor: Equant (November 2000); Global One (January 2000)
- Founded: 1 June 2006; 20 years ago
- Key people: Aliette Mousnier-Lompre (CEO)
- Revenue: ▲€7.930 billion (2022)
- Operating income: ▲€317 million (2022)
- Number of employees: ▲30,000
- Parent: Orange S.A.
- Website: www.orange-business.com

Orange Business, the business services arm of Orange S.A., provides communications, technology, and services for multinational corporations.

On 16 February 2023, Orange Business Services was renamed as Orange Business.

Orange Business offers integrated communications products and services to global enterprises in cloud computing, unified communications, collaboration, big data, Internet of things, and artificial intelligence, which manage and integrate the complexity of international communications and software applications.

Orange Business was founded on 1 June 2006, through a rebranding and consolidation of the existing France Telecom businesses of Equant and Wanadoo. Orange Business also acquired the companies Business & Decision and Basefarm, which specialize in data analytics, data science, and cloud services.

Operating in over 220 countries and territories, the company employs over 21,000 employees in 166 countries. The company has invested €700 million in research and development, employing 8,000 people including scientists, engineers, developers, designers, sociologists, and marketers.

Orange Labs is made up of 12 research and development and innovation centers across four continents and has 7,000 patents. It's ranked the 19th most innovative company worldwide.

== History ==
=== Background of global ownership of Orange: Before May 2000 ===
In May 2000, the Orange brand, through a complex set of mergers and divisions, was acquired and eventually retained by Orange S.A., then a fully owned subsidiary of France Télécom. The chain of mergers that led to the May 2000 acquisition is as follows.

The inception of the Orange brand was in 1990 in the United Kingdom with the formation of "Microtel Communications Ltd" - a consortium initially formed by Pactel Corporation (American), British Aerospace (BAe, now BAE Systems), Millicom, and Matra (French); and later, to be wholly owned by BAe. In July 1991, the Hong Kong-based conglomerate - Hutchison Whampoa through a stock swap deal with BAe, acquired a controlling stake of 65% in Microtel, who by then had won a license to develop a Personal communications network (PCN) network in United Kingdom.

Subsequently, Hutchison renamed Microtel to Orange Personal Communications Services Ltd, and on 28 April 1994, Orange brand was launched in the UK mobile phone market . A holding company structure was adopted in 1995 with the establishment of Orange plc. In April 1996, Orange went public and floated on the London Stock Exchange and NASDAQ, majority owned by Hutchison (48.22%), followed by BAe (21.1%). In June 1996, it became the youngest company to enter the FTSE 100, valued at £2.4 billion. And by July 1997 Orange had gained one million customers.

The stint as a public company came to an end in October 1999, when it was acquired for US$33 Billion by the German conglomerate - Mannesmann AG. The Mannesmann's acquisition of Orange triggered Vodafone to make a hostile takeover bid for the German company. Shortly thereafter, in February 2000, Vodafone acquired Mannesmann for US$183 Billion and, decides to divest Orange as the EU regulations wouldn't allow it to hold two mobile licences. France Télécom in May 2000, announced the acquisition of the global operations of Orange from Vodafone for US$37 Billion and the transaction was completed in August 2000.

=== Evolution of business services arm of France Telecom: 2000–2006 ===
In January 2000, France Telecom bought out its partners Sprint Nextel and Deutsche Telekom in the Global One joint venture for US$3.88 billion to expand its managed data networks and IP-based communication services.

In November 2000, France Telecom acquired a controlling stake of 53% in Dutch-based network operator Equant, part of the SITA group of companies which provided network services to the air transport industry. France Telecom started the process of integrating Global One unit with Equant in 2001 and acquired all outstanding Equant stock by 2005.

=== Launch of Orange Business Services: 2006–present ===
On 1 June 2006, France Telecom announced the consolidation of the group's business services operations and rebranded the businesses of Equant and Wanadoo to a new single entity - 'Orange Business Services'. The rebranding exercise created France Telecom SA's global brand for mobile telephony, as well as all broadband and business connectivity services - Orange.

== Organisation and operations ==
It operates in over 220 countries and territories and employs over 30,000 employees in 166 countries. It is organised in the following geographical divisions:

- Europe (based in Paris, France)
- Middle East & Africa
- Russia
- Asia Pacific (based in Singapore, Hong Kong, Malaysia, Australia, Japan, India)
- North America (based in Atlanta, USA)
- Latin America (based in Petrópolis, Brazil)

It has five major services centers in Mauritius, Egypt, India, Brazil and France.

== Products and services ==
It offers integrated communication products and services to global enterprises in cloud computing, unified communications, collaboration, Big Data, Internet of things and Artificial Intelligence which manage and integrate the complexity of international communications and software applications.

The service and products portfolio include,

- End-to-end enterprise integration in Data Center Management, Server Management, Network Management, PC life-cycle Management, Security Management and Messaging Administration.
- Datavenue End-to-end single platform for Internet of Things (IoT), Artificial Intelligence, Cognitive Services, Analytics and specialized in Smart Cities
- Deliver and manage complex PBX, IP Voice based services, Unified Communications & Collaboration services
- ITIL-aligned methodology and processes
- Application management capabilities across verticals for CRM applications, IPT applications, Database Integration
- Remote Infrastructure Management services
- WAN-LAN integration, design and management expertise

== Case studies ==
The complex merger operations that led to ownership of Orange by France Telecom and its subsequent branding is a subject for numerous management case studies on topics like strategic management, brand management, PEST analysis, financing methods of merger and acquisitions and leveraged buyouts.

== See also ==
- Orange S.A.
