= Orange Armenia =

- Company type: Private
- Industry: Telecommunications
- Founded: 2009
- Defunct: December 21, 2015
- Area served: Armenia
- Revenue: ▲AMD 20 billion (2012)
- Number of employees: 800
- Parent: Orange S.A.

Orange Armenia (Armenian: Օրանժ Արմենիա) was the Armenian branch of telecommunications company Orange S.A. It was one of the three licensed mobile networking companies until 2015.

== History ==
Orange entered the Armenian telecommunication market with the mobile services delivery operating licence in fall of 2009, and had 501,000 subscribers by the end of 2014. The business employed 500 people by that date.

In July 2015, Orange decided to withdraw from the Armenian market since, as the leadership explained: "its Armenian unit did not have the scale to carry out the investments required to offer its own converged services in the country".

Orange announced its negotiations with local Armenian ISP Ucom Limited Liability Company in July 2015, stating that the deal would create a "strong Armenian player capable of offering its customers a broad range of fixed and mobile services."

In August 2015, talks were announced to be concluded successfully and the Armenian Public Services Regulatory Commission cleared the deal, admitting that "Orange Armenia lacks the resources required to justify investing in its network, in particular in offering converged fixed and mobile services in the country".

The final merger was officially announced to enter into force as of 21 December 2015. Since that time, Ucom became the only shareholder of Orange Armenia CJSC and legal successor of all its liabilities of Orange Armenia.
