= Orange S.A. suicides =

French employee harassment trial

The Orange S.A. suicides, or the France Telecom trial, was a French court case against the company France Telecom (which became Orange S.A. in 2013) regarding employee harassment. The cases, over the period 2006 to 2011, reached their climax in 2009 in a period nicknamed "the suicide crisis" – which amounted to 35 suicides in 2008 and 2009 according to the unions and management.

== NExT plan and new management methods ==
The NExT plan was a recovery plan for the company which aimed, among other things, at firing 22,000 of the 120,000 employees in three years. The NExT plan was rather drastic. In 2004, 4,000 employees were trained for ten days, in order to implement the NExT plan on the ground: reducing the workforce was a priority, new management techniques were introduced, and the method was to degrade working conditions in order to psychologically push some of the employees to leave voluntarily, thus reducing the amount of compensation which would have to be paid.

== The legal case ==
The SUD (Union syndicale Solidaires) and the CFE-CGC (Confédération française de l'encadrement - Confédération générale des cadres) trade unions filed a legal complaint on 15 December 2009 (which was registered in March 2010) against France Telecom and Didier Lombard, chairman and CEO, Olivier Barberot, Director of Human Relations and Louis-Pierre Wenès, Executive Vice President.

== The trial ==
This was the first trial of a CAC 40 company for employee harassment. The main defendant was Didier Lombard, chairman and CEO at the time. The case "became a symbol of suffering at work". On 6 January 2015, the investigation closed in on the wave of suicides, which paved the way for recognition, by the courts, of institutional harassment.

In July 2016, the Paris public prosecutor's office requested that the company Orange, as a legal entity, and six managers be referred to the criminal court for harassment: Didier Lombard, the group's former director, Louis-Pierre Wenes, its former number 2, Olivier Barberot, the former head of human resources, and four managers for complicity. The CFE-CGC, for its part, called for the qualification of manslaughter instead of harassment. This represented the first time that a large company was prosecuted in France for this offence.

In June 2018, the courts decided to bring France Telecom, its former CEO Didier Lombard and his second-in-command Louis-Pierre Wenès and Oliver Barberot to trial for harassment in 2019.

Thirty-nine individual cases (19 suicides, 12 attempted suicides, 8 depressions or work stoppages) were discussed at the trial in 2019.

== Verdict ==
In December 2019, Orange, formerly France Telecom, its former CEO Didier Lombard and six other managers and executives were convicted of "employee harassment", almost ten years after the crisis during which several dozen employees died by suicide.

In his trial on his human resources management policy at Orange, Didier Lombard was sentenced to one year in prison, eight months of which were suspended, and a fine of the Group, renamed Orange in 2013, must pay a fine of 75,000 euros. Didier Lombard decided to appeal.

In September 2022 the conviction of Lombard and three other executives was upheld by the Paris Court of Appeal.

== Cultural impact ==
Martin Ledun's book Les Visages écrasés (2011), and Vincent Farasse's play Un Incident, deal with similar fictional cases. Sandra Lucbert's novel Personne ne sorti les fusils (2020) attacks the "language of capitalism" used by France Telecom managers. Nicolas Silhol's film Corporate (2017) was imagined as a result of this case.

== See also ==
- Critique of work
- Karoshi
- Workaholism
