= Eastern Mediterranean Optical System 1 =

Submarine fibre optic cable system

The Eastern Mediterranean Optical System (EMOS-1) is a fiber optic cable linking Palermo, Italy with Lechaina, Greece; Marmaris, Turkey and Tel Aviv, Israel, which was created in Turkey in 1991. Consisting of three pairs which are split en route through branching units. The ship CS Vercors laid the cable. Each pair of fibres are capable of transmitting 1920 telephone calls in each direction.

== History ==
In November 1990, the undersea cable EMOS-1, connecting Israel with Turkey, Greece and Italy, was deployed. This was the first Israeli-built undersea cable, and was augmented by CIOS in April 1994. Since then, other cables have been laid which have provided large capacity links between Israel and abroad.

== See also ==
- CIOS (cable system)
- List of international submarine communications cables
