= HMS Blackburn (1944) =

Royal Navy aircraft transport

HMS Blackburn was the lead ship of the Blackburn-class aircraft transports built for the Royal Navy in World War II.

She was launched on 25 March 1944 at Blyth Shipbuilding & Dry Docks Company in Blyth, Northumberland, England. With a length of 172 feet (52 metres) and a beam of 30 feet (9 metres), she displaced 990 tons. Her propulsion consisted of two 8-cylinder diesel engines. The ship's purpose was to transport aircraft and spare parts along the coasts of the British Isles.

In 1950 she became a RNVR training ship.

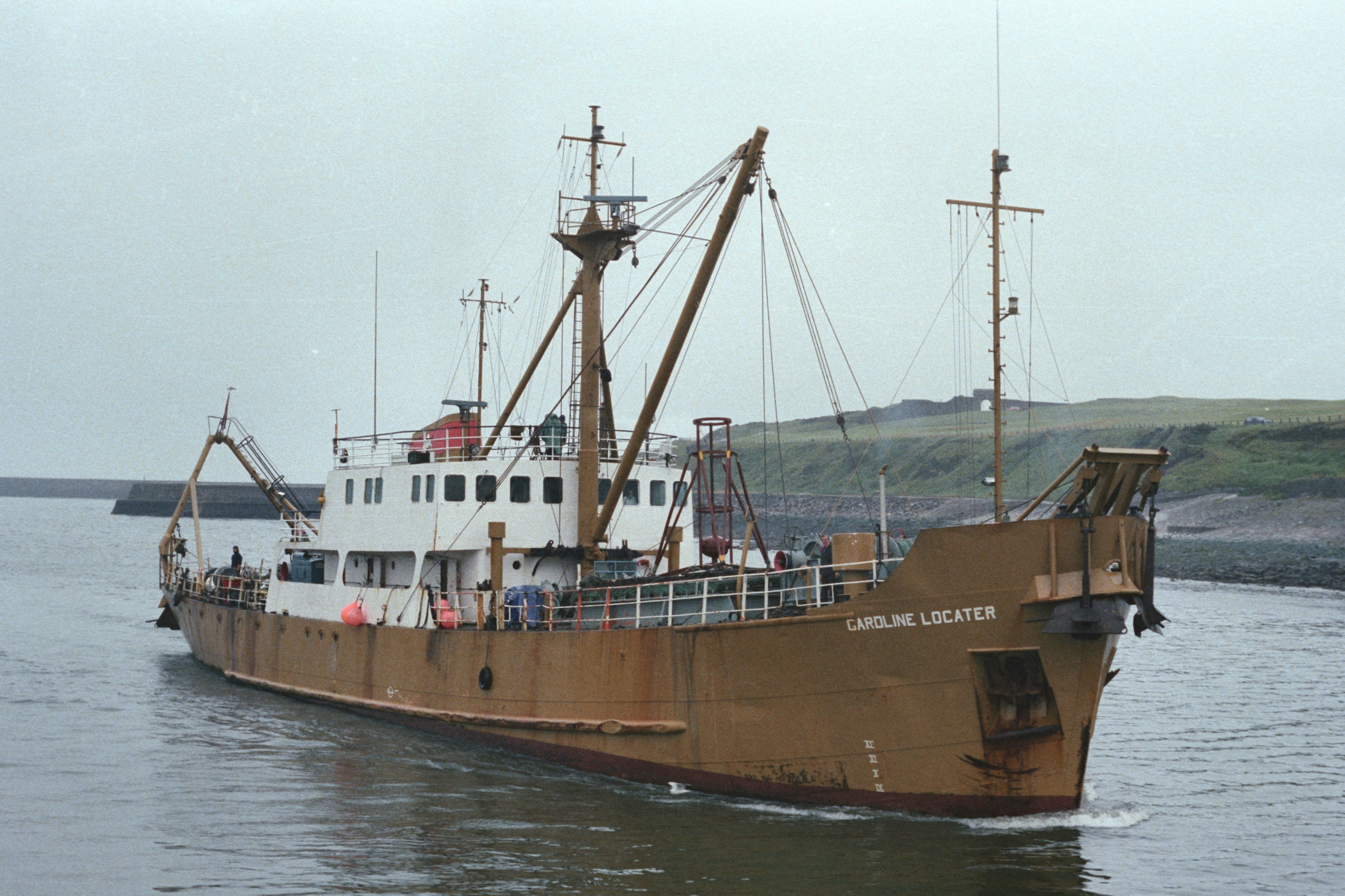
Gardline Locater entering Aberdeen

In July 1968 the ship was sold to Pounds Shipowners and Shipbreakers Ltd in Portsmouth, but was subsequently sold again to Gardline Shipping in Great Yarmouth, a company founded in 1969 to provide offshore services to the oil and gas industry in the North Sea. Gardline Shipping had the ship converted into a deep sea research vessel and renamed her Gardline Locater (IMO number 7048063, 747 GRT).

In July 1985 the ship played a key role in the recovery of the cockpit voice recorder (CVR) and the flight data recorder (FDR) of Air India Flight 182 that disintegrated in mid air after a bomb explosion on 23 June 1985 with 329 people on board off the southwest coast of Ireland. Gardline Locater, equipped with sophisticated sonar, and the French cable-laying vessel Léon Thévenin, with her robot submarine Scarab 1, were dispatched to locate the CVR and FDR boxes. They would be difficult to find and it was imperative that the search commence quickly. On 4 July, Gardline Locater detected the signals of these boxes on the sea bed at a depth of more than 2000 meters. On 9 July, Scarab 1 pinpointed the CVR and raised it to the surface; the next day, she also located and recovered the FDR.

In August 1997 the ship was sold to Singapore to be scrapped.

== Literature ==
- J. J. Colledge, Ben Warlow: Ships of the Royal Navy: The Complete Record of all Fighting Ships of the Royal Navy, Chatham Book, Casemate, Philadelphia & Newbury, 2010, ISBN 978-1-935149-07-1, pg. 45
- Maurice Cocker: Aircraft-carrying ships of the Royal Navy, History Press, Stroud (Gloucestershire), 2008, ISBN 0752446339, S. 125–126
