= Israeli Internet Exchange =

Internet exchange point in Israel

- Abbreviation: IIX
- Founded: 1996
- Location: Israel, Hod HaSharon (at Med-1)
- Website: isoc.org.il/iix
- Members: 15 as of August 2014

The Israeli Internet Exchange (IIX) is an Internet exchange point (IXP) that provides peering services for the Internet Service Providers in Israel, essentially routing all intra-Israel internet traffic. It is managed by the non-profit Israel Internet Association organization making it as well a not-for-profit operation.

Until June 1996 much of the Israeli Internet service providers were connected by and to ILAN (the Israeli Academic Network), by order of the Ministry of Communications these links had to be dismantled. This could have created a gap which would have caused intra-Israel traffic to be routed through North America. The Israel Internet Association decided to create IIX, to optimize Israeli routing.

== See also ==
- List of Internet exchange points
- Internet exchange points
- Internet in Israel
- Israel Internet Association
