= ALETAR =

ALETAR is a submarine telecommunications cable system in the Mediterranean Sea linking Egypt and Syria.

It has landing points in:

- Alexandria, Egypt.
- Tartus, Syria.

It has a design transmission capacity of 5 Gbit/s and a total cable length of 787 kilometres (489 mi). It started operation on April 7, 1997.
