= Orange Marine =

French telecommunications company

- Type: Subsidiary
- Industry: Telecommunications
- Founded: 1999; 27 years ago
- Headquarters: 16-18, rue Paul Lafargue 92800 Puteaux France
- Number of locations: 2 marine bases in Brest and La Seyne-sur-Mer
- Key people: Didier Dillard (CEO)
- Services: Installation and maintenance of submarine telecommunication systems
- Number of employees: 250
- Parent: Orange S.A.
- Website: marine.orange.com

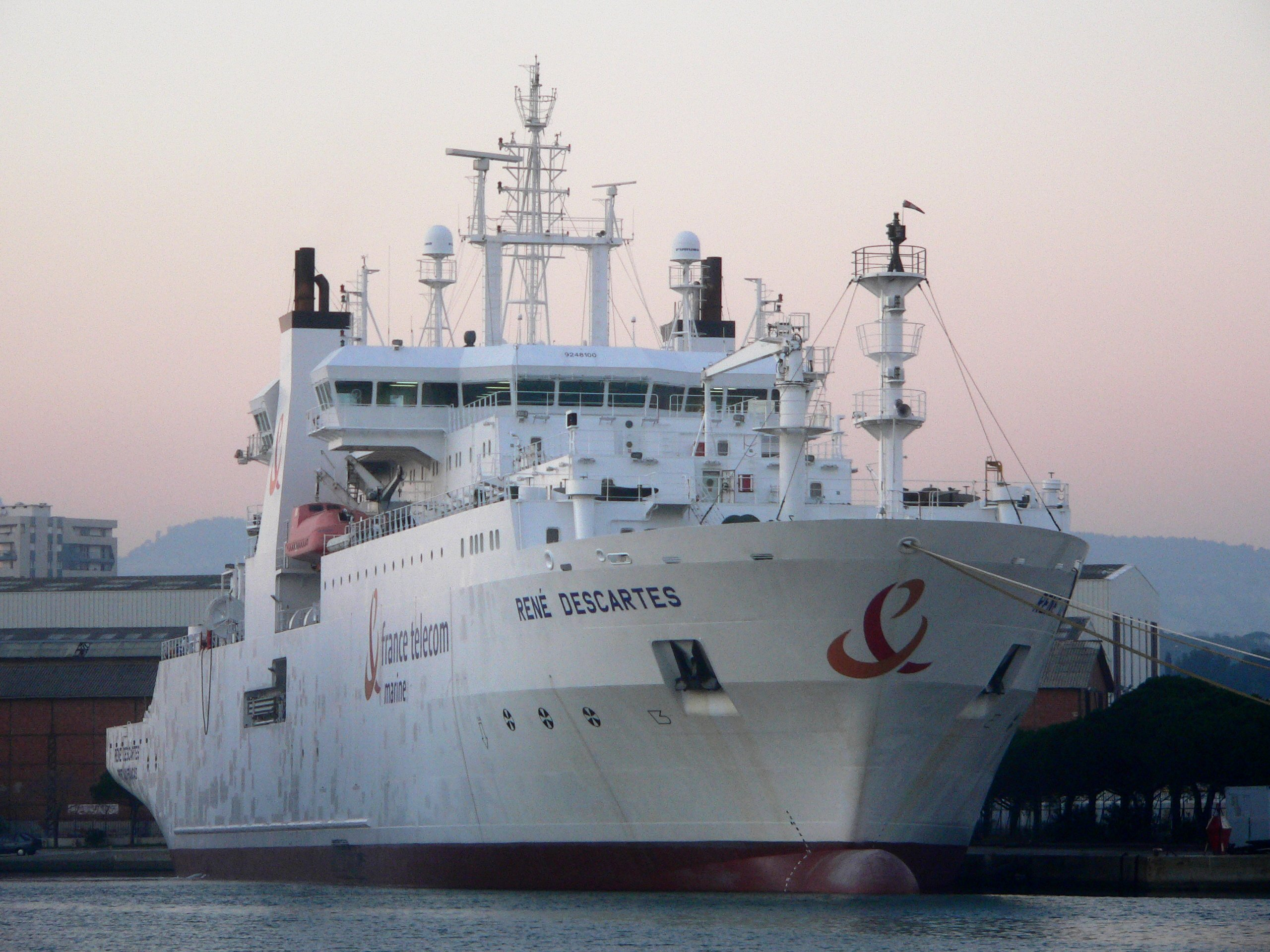
Orange Marine's cable ship René Descartes

Orange Marine (formerly France Télécom Marine) is a wholly owned subsidiary of Orange S.A. It is a major actor in the laying of new submarine communications cables and the maintenance of existing cables across the world's oceans. The company is active in all areas of these activities, including the study (survey) and the shore ends. Orange Marine took control of Elettra (previously owned by Telecom Italia) on 1 October 2010, and now operates six cable ships, which is 15% of the world fleet. The CEO of Orange Marine and Elettra is Didier Dillard.

== Installation and maintenance activities ==
Orange Marine lays new submarine cables and repairs broken links without any interruption of traffic. Orange Marine and Elettra fleets perform an average of 40 operations a year.

Orange Marine has laid more than 130,000 kilometres (81,000 mi) of submarine cable in all oceans, 15,000 km (9,300 mi) of which were buried with its ploughs. From 2001 through 2011, cable ships carried out nearly 300 repairs, some of which were at a depth of 5,000 metres (16,000 ft).

Orange Marine has completed the laying and maintenance of cables in West Africa in Senegal, Cameroon, Benin, Angola, Nigeria and South Africa, as well as in East Africa, Reunion Island, Madagascar and Mauritius, Asia and Indonesia. The company also laid a new cable in the Caribbean sea, linking U.S. Virgin Islands, the Dominican Republic and Jamaica.

== Cable ships fleet ==
The fleet covers all of the world's oceans, divided into four regions of operation: ACMA (Atlantic and Northern Europe), MECMA with Elettra (Mediterranean, Black Sea, Red Sea), Southern Hemisphere (West, South and East Africa) and the Indian Ocean. Submarine cables laid in the same area are covered by a maintenance agreement.

Orange Marine and Elettra own a fleet of six cable ships and a complete range of submarine engines, shipping from its marine bases or foreign harbours:

Locations of Orange Marine cable depots
- C/S Léon Thévenin, based in Brest at the AMB (Atlantic Marine Base), repairs the cables in the Atlantic zone and in Northern Europe.
- C/S René Descartes is dedicated to the installation of submarine cables on a worldwide range.
- C/S Teliri operates laying operations, mainly around the Mediterranean Basin.
- C/S Antonio Meucci conducts submarine systems inspections, ROV operations and maintenance of telecommunications cables.
- C/S Pierre de Fermat, operating since 2014, installs and maintains submarine cables in the Atlantic and Northern Europe zone.
- C/S Sophie Germain, the newest vessel launched in September 2023, based at La Seyne-sur-Mer, operates on maintenance agreements.

Elettra operates two of the cable ships, the Certamen and the Teliri, under the Italian flag, along with a survey vessel, the Urbano Monti, and owns a cable depot in Catania.

Orange Marine plan to construct two new cable ships by 2029, which will replace the C/S Antonio Meucci and C/S Léon Thévenin.

In order to protect, watch and repair intercontinental damaged links, Orange Marine, through its subsidiary SIMEC, designs, manufactures and operates submarine vehicles (ROV and ploughs) used to carry out assignments:

- The Hector ROV (Remotely Operated Vehicle), which is remotely controlled from the ship via its umbilical cable, can lift the cable, hold it and cut it using articulated arms.
- Elodie, the plough, is used to bury the cable at significant depths.

== See also ==
- Orange S.A.
- Submarine communications cable
- Cable layer

== Bibliography ==
- Du Morse à l'Internet - 150 ans de télécommunication par câbles sous-marins by Rene Salvador, Gérard Fouchard and Yves Rolland, 2006, ISBN 978-2952612104
