= Israel Internet Association =

Non-profit organization and .il domain registry

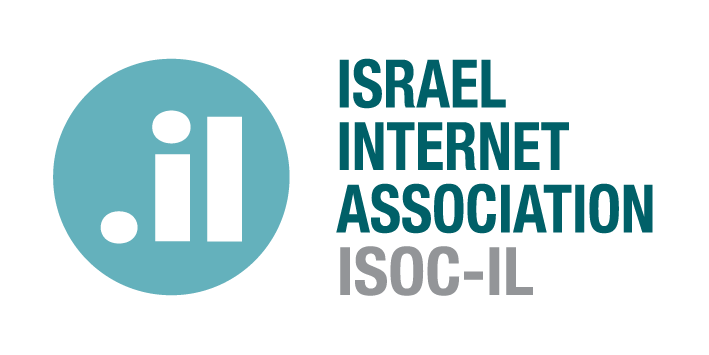
Israel Internet Association logo

Israel Internet Association (ISOC-IL; Hebrew: איגוד האינטרנט הישראלי) is a non-profit organization and .il country code top-level domains (ccTLD) registry managed by seven volunteer board members. It was the second organization in the world to be accepted as a chapter of the Internet Society. It is also a member of the RIPE NCC regional Internet registry.

In addition to managing .il (ccTLD) registry, the association is also responsible for managing the Israeli Internet Exchange (IIX), and hosts a DNS root server duplicate at its facilities.
