= TAT-12/13 =

Transatlantic telephone cable

TAT-12/13 is a ring cable system consisting of the 12th and 13th consortia transatlantic telephone cables, in operation from 1996, initially carrying 2 × 5 Gbit/s.

This was the first TAT cable to use a ring structure, involving two stretches of cable across the ocean floor, which explains why two numbers (12 and 13) were used. All later cables also use a ring structure, but only use one number (TAT-14 etc.). The cable connected between Long Island (at Shirley, New York), USA; Green Hill, Rhode Island, USA; Porthcurno, UK; Bude, UK; and Penmarch, France.

The cable was constructed for US$740 million and was supplied jointly by AT&T Submarine Systems, Inc (now TE Subcom owned by TE Connectivity), STC Submarine Systems (acquired by Alcatel-Lucent) and Alcatel Submarcom. Ring switching equipment was provided by the Toshiba Corporation in each of the four cable stations.

The cables in this system were the first on the trans-Atlantic route to make use of erbium-doped fiber amplifiers.

The TAT-12/13 consortia removed the cable from normal commercial service on 31 December 2008.

== Sources ==
- Trischitta, Patrick; Colas, Michel; Green, Mick; Wuzniak, George; Arena, John (February 1996). "The TAT-12/13 Cable Network". IEEE Communications Magazine. 34 (2): 24–28. doi:10.1109/35.481240.
