= ITUR =

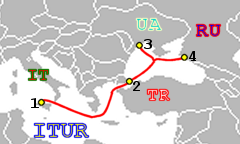

ITUR (Italy - Turkey - Ukraine - Russia) is a submarine communications cable system linking the aforementioned countries.

It has landing points in:

1. Palermo, Sicily, Italy
2. Istanbul, Turkey
3. Odesa, Ukraine
4. Novorossiysk, Russia
