= Berytar =

Submarine telecommunications cable

BERYTAR is a submarine telecommunications cable system in the Mediterranean Sea linking Syria and Lebanon.

It has landing points in:

- Beirut, Lebanon
- Saida, Lebanon
- Trablous, Lebanon
- Tartous, Syria

It has a design transmission capacity of 5 Gbit/s and a total cable length of 134 km. It started operation on 7 April 1997.

The owners are:

- Lebanese Ministry of Telecommunications
- Syrian Telecommunications Establishment
