= KAFOS =

KAFOS (Karadeniz Fiber Optik Sistemi - Black Sea Fibre Optic System) is a submarine telecommunications cable system in the Black Sea linking Romania, Bulgaria, and Turkey.

It has landing points in:

- Mangalia, Romania
- Varna, Bulgaria
- Istanbul, Turkey

it has a transmission capacity of 8 Tbit/s, and a total cable length of 504 km. It started operation on 13 June 1997.
