= CIOS (cable system) =

Submarine telecommunications cable system in the Mediterranean Sea

Cyprus-Israel Optical System (CIOS) is a submarine telecommunications cable system in the Mediterranean Sea linking Cyprus and Israel.

== Overview ==
CIOS has landing points in Ayia Napa (Greek: Αγία Νάπα), Cyprus and Nahariya (Hebrew: נַהֲרִיָּה), Israel].

It has a design transmission capacity of 622 Mbit/s and a total cable length of 250 km. The system was supplied by AT&T Submarine Systems and was the longest non-repeatered commercial system at the time.

Operations began on 11 April 1994.

== See also ==
- EuroAsia Interconnector
- Cyprus-Israel relations
