= GEC Plessey Telecommunications =

Company during 1988 to mid 1990s

GEC Plessey Telecommunications (GPT)
- Type: Joint Venture
- Industry: telecommunications
- Predecessor: GEC; Plessey
- Founded: 1988
- Defunct: 1998
- Fate: Merged into Marconi Communications (1998); Amalgamated into Siemens Communications (1998)
- Successor: Marconi Communications; Siemens Communications
- Owner: GEC / Plessey (50/50) (1988–1989); GEC / Siemens (60/40) (1989–1998); GEC (1998)
- Website: gpt.co.uk at the Wayback Machine (archived 1997-12-11)

GEC Plessey Telecommunications (GPT) was a British manufacturer of telecommunications equipment, notably the System X telephone exchange. The company was founded in 1988 as a joint venture between GEC and the British electronics, defence and telecommunications company Plessey. The next year, after a joint holding company of GEC and the German conglomerate Siemens acquired Plessey, GPT was converted into a 60/40 GEC/Siemens joint venture. The GPT name ceased to be used in the mid-1990s, and in 1998 the company was amalgamated into Siemens Communications.

== History ==
=== Formation ===
The evolution of GPT can be traced to 1986, when the General Electric Company (GEC) attempted a takeover of Plessey, a British-based international electronics, defence and telecommunications company founded in 1917; the takeover was barred by regulatory authorities. As an amicable solution, GEC and Plessey merged their telecommunications businesses (25,000 employees at the time) on 1 April 1988 as GEC Plessey Telecommunications. GPT was a world leader in many fields, for example Synchronous Digital Hierarchy (SDH) technology, and the merger brought the two companies responsible for developing and building the System X telephone exchange together, which was supposed to make selling System X simpler.

=== GEC/Siemens joint venture: 1989–1998 ===
In 1989, GEC and the German conglomerate Siemens made a hostile takeover of the Plessey Company through their joint holding company, GEC Siemens plc. While most of Plessey's assets were divided between the companies, GPT remained a joint venture with a 60/40 shareholding by GEC and Siemens respectively. In 1991, because Plessey no longer existed, GEC Plessey Telecommunications was renamed to just the initial letters GPT (or GPTel in France, since in French "GPT" sounds like "j'ai pété", "I have broken wind").

=== Merger into Siemens Communications ===
During the mid-1990s, the name GPT gradually disappeared in the UK, and by October 1997 the joint venture, through a series of Siemens mergers and acquisitions, evolved into Siemens GEC Communication Systems (SGCS), which later, in 1998, merged into Siemens Business Communication Systems (SBCS) to form the largest division of Siemens AG – Siemens Communications.

== Successors ==
In August 1998, GEC acquired Siemens' 40% stake in GPT (by now only existing as a legal entity) and merged GPT with the telecoms units of its other subsidiaries – Marconi SpA, GEC Hong Kong and ATC South Africa – to form Marconi Communications. In December 1999, GEC's defence arm Marconi Electronic Systems was amalgamated with British Aerospace to form BAE Systems. The remaining part of GEC was renamed to Marconi plc, and Marconi Communications became its principal subsidiary.

Marconi decided to focus on the then-booming telecoms sector, but acquisitions made during the dot-com bubble took a heavy toll on the company following the "burst of the dot-com bubble" in 2000/2001. On 19 May 2003, Marconi plc underwent a major restructuring into Marconi Corporation plc. In 2005, the company failed to secure any part of BT's 21st Century Network (21CN) programme, which sent the company's shares tumbling. The majority of Marconi Corporation's businesses (including Marconi Communications) were sold to Ericsson in 2005, and the remainder renamed Telent. On 27 October 2006, the company wound up voluntarily.

The part of GPT which evolved into Siemens Communications eventually merged into Siemens Enterprise Communications in 2008.
