= Telecom transformation =

Telecom transformation (or IP transformation) is the evolution of the telecommunications industry from a capital-intensive, technology-focused model to a user-centric service-delivery model. The reasons for this transformation vary in different parts of the world, but some concerns are common to most telecom service providers. Drivers for transformation include threats such as competitive pressures and the disruptive business models of players in other technologies affect the traditional business of the service providers. (E.g. As this page is written, the traditional voice-service business of PSTN service providers is facing threats from the disruptive business models of Internet based service providers such as Google and Skype when they already were battling to fend off new competitors such as multi-service operators.)

In order to maintain their market, the service providers are introducing new attractive services to the end-users, which require modifications to their current infrastructure (aka legacy infrastructure) into what is typically termed a next-generation infrastructure. The process of converting or modifying the network elements, end-user services and business-processes of the service provider to achieve the competitive advantages offered by the newer technologies is known as transformation. This transformation is enabled by Internet protocol (IP)-based technology. The introduction of the new infrastructure, services and business-processes may or may not be accompanied by the dismantling of the legacy setup.

In cases where service providers are looking to reduce operating expenses in addition to creating new end-user services, elimination of the legacy network becomes a requirement. In these transformation scenarios, carriers replace aging legacy network elements and systems in favor of more efficient technologies. These types of transformation programs may require carriers to transition subscribers and commercial services from the legacy to the new networks.

== Transformation sub-processes ==
The telecom transformation process is a combination of the following three sub-processes.

- Telecom network transformation
- End-user service transformation
- IT systems transformation

While these are the three main categories of network and systems change within the carrier environment, there are additional fundamental changes that service providers will undertake to adapt their business and organization to a new operating model.

== Telecom network transformation ==
The network transformation sub-process refers to the activities adding new elements in the core network, backbone network and access network. The typical activities include the following:

- Network planning and design
- Equipment and vendor selection
- Verification of equipment through lab-demos, simulations and interoperability testing
- Devising and using network configuration data transfer mechanisms and tools
- Migration planning and implementation
- Network deployment
- Cut-over plans along with fall-back and roll-back plans

== End-user services transformation ==
This sub-process is aimed at ensuring that the services offered in the legacy network and availed by the end-users continue to be available during the transition phase and up to a planned future. This sub-process is also concerned with introduction of new end-user services into the next-generation network. Typical activities include:

- Identifying mechanisms to glue legacy services to the new network
- Designing and developing network abstraction layers for implementing new service applications
- Developing proof-of-concept to validate new services in labs
- Developing and executing migration services to transition subscribers from legacy to the new network

== IT systems transformation ==
This refers to the sub-process that is involved in aligning the operations support system and business support system infrastructure with the transformed network. The typical set of activities that characterize this sub-process include:

- Streamlining fulfillment, assurance and billing processes
- Rationalizing existing applications to merge, consolidate or retire systems
- Designing and implementing end-to-end solution

== See also ==
- BT 21CN: Transformation in British Telecom's network
- U-Verse: Transformation in AT&T's network
