= 1997 Special Honours =

British government recognitions

As part of the British honours system, Special Honours are issued at the Monarch's pleasure at any given time. The Special Honours refer to the awards made within royal prerogative, operational honours and other honours awarded outside the New Years Honours and Birthday Honours

== Life Peer ==
- Terence James Thomas, Esquire, C.B:E., to be Baron Thomas of Macclesfield, of Prestbury in the County of Cheshire.
- George Simpson to be Baron Simpson of Dunkeld, of Dunkeld in Perth and Kinross.

== Order of the Thistle ==
- The Right Honourable James Peter Hymers Mackay, Lord Mackay of Clashfern, PC

== Royal Victorian Order ==
=== Knight Commander (KCVO) ===
- David John Michael Dain, C.M.G
- The Honourable Sir David Alwyn Gore-Booth, K.C.M.G.

=== Commander (CVO) ===
- Gregory John Dorey.
- Brigadier Robin Anthony Draper, O.B.E.
- Colin William Perchard, O.B.E.
- James Wilfrid Watt.

=== Lieutenant (LVO) ===
- Miss May Fyfe Gibson.
- Timothy Mark Kitchens.
- Sidney Hodgson Palmer.
- Richard James Wildash.

=== Member (MVO) ===
- Jacinta Mary Catharine, Mrs. Banks.
- Miss Joanna Fowler.
- Philip John Hickson.
- Elizabeth Jane, Mrs. Wildash.
