= System Y =

Digital switching system

System Y is the terminology used by BT, the main operator of the telephone network in the United Kingdom, to refer to the Ericsson AXE digital switching system.

In the mid-1980s, British Telecom chose the well established AXE10 digital switch to provide competition for System X developed by a consortium of Plessey, General Electric Company (GEC) (companies later combined as GPT), STC and BT's state owned predecessor, the GPO. The newly privatised BT brought in Ericsson as a competitive alternative supplier ending Plessey/GEC's monopoly on the provision of switching systems.

Initially, the AXE systems installed in the UK were partially locally manufactured in partnership with Thorn EMI and later directly by Ericsson. While System X exchanges were more widespread in BT's network, AXE10 (and subsequent versions) remain common in the classic BT PSTN until their eventual replacement when the network is closed, which at the time of the writing is expected to be in 2027

AXE10 covers two main types of digital telephony switching equipment: the remote subscriber switch (RSS) and the AXE10 local switch. RSS acts as a remote concentrator and deals with the conversion of analogue telephony signals used in the access network, which is the copper pairs between exchange buildings and customer premises, also called local loop, and the multiplexing of customer lines over cabling to the AXE10 local switching unit. The AXE10 local switch uses a processor-controlled switch to route calls and data depending on the destination of the telephony transmission.

BT's AXE10 network, which has been in service since 1986, is maintained in house by its own engineers although Ericsson still provide high-level support, software upgrades and repairs at component level.

AXE/System Y, System X and other TDM technologies are already being be phased out as BT, in common with many networks around the world, implements its next generation access network, which will ultimately be based predominantly on fibre to premises (FTTP), with voice services provided using VoIP technology.
