= Optilan =

British communications equipment company

- Company type: Private
- Industry: Communications equipment, security
- Founded: 24 January 1990
- Founder: Tim Allen; Richard Buckland; Eamonn McFadden
- Headquarters: Coventry, United Kingdom
- Key people: Jason Keith, CEO; Dennis O’Leary Board Chair
- Services: System design, integration, installation and maintenance, cable and fibre optic installation, product build and Ttest
- Number of employees: 110 (2022)
- Website: www.optilan.com

Founded in 1990, Optilan operates across a multitude of industries including energy, critical national infrastructure, pipeline, telecommunications and rail projects.

Its head office is located in the United Kingdom, with additional offices in Azerbaijan, United Arab Emirates, Turkey, India, and the United States. It is a privately owned business employing around 200 people on a full-time basis in addition to a number of field experts brought in for specific projects.

Optilan's business operations have evolved since starting off as a communications and fibre optic specialist in 1990. Optilan has expanded into a supplier of communications and security systems, providing design through to site commissioning and support.

== History ==
=== Early years ===
Optilan was formed in 1990 by friends and co-apprentices from GEC Telecommunications (now Telent); Tim Allen, Richard Buckland and Eamonn McFadden.

Prior to forming the company, Buckland and Allen had been working at Walmore Electronics- a fibre optics company in Central London. They left as the company moved into other areas. After discovering that Walmore was no longer continuing in the field of the contracts they had been working on; Allen and Buckland gained their blessing to secure work with a number of the clients including; The BBC, Royal Albert Hall, Honeywell in Taiwan and Dubal Aluminium in Dubai. McFadden, who had been working for GEC in Thailand, then joined the pair to become the third member of the team.

From 1991, Optilan had started taking orders over £100,000, the first of which being in the Isle of Wight for Plessey Radar, where Optilan installed a fibre optic transmission system.

As the company grew in size, Bal Kler and Chris Yarwood joined the three original company founders on the board of directors and more staff were employed on a full-time basis.

=== Channel Tunnel Rail Link ===
In 2001, Optilan was given the contract to work on the Channel Tunnel Rail Link, providing the CCTV, Data Transmission Network (DTN) and the Local Area Network (LAN). Optilan was also offered the maintenance contract for the support of these systems.

=== Coventry Citywide Network ===
Coventry City Council's own network was the first of its kind to be installed in the UK in 2007. With over 87 miles of fibre optic cables being laid around Coventry by Optilan, the system now reaches all of the council buildings and schools to meet the demands of the city's 300,000 residents and enable local schools to get faster broadband access. This was also Optilan's first contract for over £10 million.

=== Strategic Venture With BlueWaterEnergy ===
In 2017, Optilan announced the arrangement of a strategic venture with BlueWaterEnergy Group (BWE), focusing on increasing and developing service offerings on a global scale.

=== Acquisition by DarkPulse Inc ===
In 2021 Optilan was acquired by DarkPulse Inc, a US public company. DarkPulse is an infrastructure monitoring company focused on Critical Infrastructure/Key Resources monitoring utilizing their patented dark-pulse BOTDA systems worldwide. The company is traded under symbol: DPLS

== Head office locations ==
Optilan's Head Office is located in the United Kingdom. The company was previously located in Kenilworth; however had to move due to an increase in company size.

Optilan's equipment build and test areas are located at their Workshop and Manufacturing facility in Leamington Spa. Products from here are distributed worldwide to be fitted within communication and security systems.

Optilan also operates from offices in Baku, Azerbaijan, Ankara, Turkey and the company's US subsidiary Optilan Inc. operates out of Houston, Texas, United States.

== Projects ==
- Channel Tunnel Rail Link – providing telecommunications, station communication and security systems.
- Scottish telecoms operator 'Thus' (previously Scottish Telecom) – Principal Contractor for OHL (Overhead Line) Fiber Wrap Replacement projects over Scottish Power's infrastructure
- University of Hertfordshire – providing optical fiber based telecommunications network and CCTV security systems for their de Havilland campus.
- Russian Permafrost Projects – Design and supply of communications infrastructure for the South Shapkino Project, encompassing wellheads, process plant and export pipeline.
- Coventry Wide Area Network (CovWAN)- A£10million upgrade of Coventry City Council's ICT network, called the wide area network (WAN) connecting all council buildings and schools to meet the needs of 300,000 residents and enabling local schools to benefit from improved broadband access and faster internet services.
