= Marconi Instruments =

Marconi Instruments Limited
- Company type: Public limited company
- Industry: Engineering
- Founded: 1936
- Defunct: 1998
- Fate: Sold to IFR Systems Inc. in 1998, which was then acquired by Aeroflex in 2002.
- Successor: IFR Systems; Aeroflex
- Headquarters: St Albans, England, UK
- Key people: R. E. Burnett (managing director)
- Products: Electronics

Marconi Instruments Limited (MI) was a British company, one of the Marconi group of companies, formerly part of GEC. Originally formed in 1936, there was a buyout of Marconi-Ekco Instruments to form the company Marconi Instruments in 1941.

The company was based in St Albans, Colchester, and Stevenage (where it eventually consolidated), all in southern England. Prior to the consolidation in Stevenage, its main site was at Longacres on the eastern outskirts of St Albans, where it was the largest employer. There were four other sites, one at Hedley Road, one on Hatfield Road, St Albans (Fleetville Works), one on the Donibristle Industrial Estate in Fife, Scotland and one at Luton Airport, Luton.

The company produced electronic test and measurement equipment and systems, including automatic test equipment. It was known for its extensive range of signal generators, from audio up to microwave frequencies. It also made oscilloscopes, voltmeters, spectrum analysers, frequency counters, function generators, component (LCR) bridges, impedance analysers, power supplies, distortion analysers, moisture meters and logic analysers. The company operated an approved calibration and metrology laboratory for the electronics industry.

Marconi Instruments was sold to IFR Systems Inc. in 1998, itself acquired by Aeroflex in 2002. The name is no longer used.

Companies with "Marconi" in their name can trace their ultimate origins, through mergers and takeovers, to The Marconi Company Ltd., founded by Guglielmo Marconi in 1897 as The Wireless Telegraph & Signal Company.
