= GEC-Marconi scientist deaths conspiracy theory =

Deaths of British scientists, linked

The GEC-Marconi scientist deaths theory looks at when between 1982 and 1990, 25 British-based GEC-Marconi scientists and engineers who worked on the Sting Ray torpedo project and United States Strategic Defense Initiative-related projects died under mysterious circumstances.

== History ==
The first death attributed to the conspiracy was that of Keith Bowden, a computer scientist, University of Essex professor, and Marconi employee, in March 1982, after his car drove off the A12 road in Witham and plunged 30 feet. The first deaths to gain widespread attention and be linked to the theory came in 1986–1987. In just about a year, six scientists died, three of whom had worked for the Marconi company, a subsidiary of the defence group General Electric Company. Most deaths were ruled suicides or accidents. One died after driving his car, which had been packed full of petrol containers, into a building. Another tied a rope to his neck and to a tree and then drove off in a car. A third died of carbon monoxide poisoning in his garage. No links were found between them. At the time, some opposition lawmakers in the British parliament called for an investigation into the deaths. Professor Colin Pritchard, an expert in mental illness and suicide, noticed that some of the men whose deaths had been ruled as suicides had neither shown signs of mental illness nor other kinds of disturbance, but had complained to people around them that their employers had asked them to partake in "strange" and "unscientific" tasks.

Proponents of the conspiracy theory link the deaths like a James Bond-esque set of assassinations, variably blaming the Soviet spy agency KGB, American spies, or even British spies. Proponents of the theory claim that the deaths were linked because of the scientists working on the same few classified projects, although most of the scientists had not been working closely together and were working on separate, mostly unclassified, projects.

The West German far-left terrorist organization Red Army Faction justified the assassination of German physicist and Siemens manager Karl Heinz Beckurts in 1986 with his involvement in nuclear and military technology research, which also included SDI research. The murders of Gerold Braunmühl by the RAF in 1986 and Licio Giorgieri by the Brigate Rosse in 1987 have also been linked to their involvement with SDI.

== Notable cases ==
The following cases and incidents have been alleged to have happened in relation to GEC-Marconi:

Name	Role	Date and cause of death	Notes
Dr. Keith Bowden	Computer scientist, SDI-Contractor and Professor at University of Essex	March 1982; Death from car accident	Fell from a bridge on the A12 road in Witham 30 feet to his death; Police ruled it a drunk driving incident; Family claims Bowden didn't drink
Lt. Colonel Anthony Godley	Part of the Royal Military College of Science in Shrivenham	April 1983; Disappeared	Abandoned his car; A revolver was found in his car's boot
Roger Hill	Radar designer for Marconi Avionics	March 1985; Suicide by gunshot	Shot himself with a shotgun
Jonathan Wash	Digital communications engineer	November 1985; Suicide by defenestration	Fell from a hotel window in Abidjan, Ivory Coast; Had expressed fears for his life
Vimal Dajibhai	Computer control engineer, part of the Sting Ray project	August 1986; Death from a high fall	Leaped from the Clifton Suspension Bridge in Bristol; Body was recovered with pants around his ankles and a puncture wound on his buttock; Open verdict
Arshad Sharif	Satellite detection scientist	October 1986; Suicide by decapitation	Tied a rope around his neck and a tree, then sat in his car and accelerated, decapitating him; Coroner raised possibility of connection to Dajibhais death
Avtar Singh-Gida	Researcher for the Ministry of Defense at Loughborough University	January 1987; Disappeared but found alive	Disappeared in 1987 and was found alive in Paris four months later; Said he tried to escape family troubles
Richard Pugh	Computer expert and consultant to the Ministry of Defense	January 1987; Death from suffocation	Found with his feet bound, a plastic bag over his head and a coiled rope around his neck; Ruled as caused by erotic asphixiation
Peter Peapell	Department head at the Royal Military College of Science	February 1987; Death from carbon monoxide poisoning	Found in his garage lying under the exhaust pipe; Police reconstruction showed it was impossible for Peapell to act alone; Open verdict
Victor Moore	Marconi engineer; part of the Zircon satellite programme	February 1987; Death from drug overdose	Told his wife he disagreed with Marconis practices
David Sands	Computer scientist at a Marconi sister company; Worked on a computer-controlled radar	March 1987; Death from car accident	Drove his car into a restaurant; Car contained extra containers of petrol; Driving conditions were reportedly good, a police officer described the road as “straight as an arrow”
Shani Warren	Personal assistant for a company that was shortly before her death taken over by Marconi	April 1987; Murdered (drowning)	Was found gagged, tied up with a noose around her head in Taplow Lake; First ruled suicide; 2021 DNA analysis proved that serial rapist Donald Robertson killed her
Mark Wisner	Software engineer for the Ministry of Defense	April 1987; Death from suffocation	Found with a plastic bag over his head and clingfilm wrapped around his face; Ruled as caused by erotic asphixiation
Russell Smith	Lab technician	January 1988; Suicide by jumping	Jumped off a cliff in Cornwall
Trevor Knight	Computer engineer for Marconi Defense Systems	March 1988; Suicide by carbon monoxide poisoning	Rigged a hose from the tailpipe into his car
Alistair Beckham	Software engineer for Marconi acquired Plessey Defense Systems	August 1988; Death from electrocution	Was found in his tool shed with wires wrapped around his body and a handkerchief in his mouth; According to his wife hours after his death men from the Ministry of Defence collected files from their house; Open verdict
Brigadier Peter Ferry	Involved with secret work on a revolutionary new gun; Member of the NATO Industrial Advisory Group	August 1988; Suicide by electrocution	Died by attaching wires to his metal tooth fillings and plugging them in the socket; Wife said he tried to drown himself weeks prior

== See also ==
- Missing scientists conspiracy theory
