= VI Technology =

- Company type: Private
- Founded: 1991
- Defunct: 2009
- Fate: Acquired by Aeroflex, Inc.
- Headquarters: Austin, Texas, United States
- Website: www.vi-tech.com

VI Technology was a privately owned company based in Austin, Texas, that provided enterprise test solutions and services. These solutions ranged from benchtop test systems to enterprise-wide test solutions. VI Technology's main product, Arendar, was used by engineering teams in design, characterization, validation, and manufacturing. Working together with key partners, Microsoft and National Instruments, VI Technology had worked with companies from the semiconductor, communications, high-tech electronics, defense, biomedical, and automotive industries. VI Technology original corporate headquarters was located in Austin, Texas, with branch locations in Dallas, Texas, and Mountain View, California.

VI Technology was bought by Aeroflex in 2009.

== History ==
VI Technology was founded in Austin, Texas, in 1991 by an electrical engineer and a computer scientist from the University of Texas. Founded to develop software instrument drivers for measurement instruments, the company expanded to develop automated test systems and enterprise test data management solutions for industry.

== Enterprise Test ==
Enterprise test is a concept that combines automated test systems and information technology to solve company-wide test problems. This concept extends the main goal of traditional test instrumentation and software which solve the problems related to individual test stations.

The idea of enterprise test encompasses multiple aspects such as enterprise test software, enterprise software platforms, engineering and business intelligence consulting services, data management, collaboration, workflow, reporting capabilities, and asset management all focused on solving the enterprise-wide testing needs.

== Arendar ==
Arendar is Enterprise test software which enables users to make reports and share test data throughout the organization through drag-and-drop report creation and Web-based accessibility. The enterprise test solution consists of a server module built on Microsoft SQL Server database with extensions for SQL Server Reporting Services and interfaces to standard automated test software including National Instruments LabVIEW, TestStand, LabWindows/CVI, and Microsoft Visual Studio .NET. Arendar uses a Web dashboard that enables users to display test results over the Web in advanced reports which automatically update with the latest data acquired from all test systems. Authorized users can access test results from anywhere on the network using a Microsoft Internet Explorer or Mozilla Firefox Web browser. Arendar was a Test and Measurement World Award Winner for Best in Test in 2004 and an Honorable Mention for Best in Test in 2006.
