= CMC Electronics =

Canadian avionics manufacturer

CMC Electronics Inc.
- Type: Public
- Industry: Avionics
- Founded: 1903; 123 years ago, in Montreal, Quebec
- Founder: Guglielmo Marconi
- Headquarters: Montreal/Saint-Laurent, Quebec, Canada
- Products: FMS, EFB, Enhanced Vision System, GPS, Mission computer, Satcom antenna
- Services: System integration, human factors
- Number of employees: ≈ 800 worldwide
- Website: cmcelectronics.ca

CMC Electronics Inc. (French: CMC Électronique) is a Canadian avionics manufacturer. The company's main manufacturing facility is located in Montreal, Quebec with additional facilities located in Sugar Grove, Illinois and Reston, Virginia.

== History ==
The company was founded in 1903 as Canadian Wireless Telegraph Company of Canada by Guglielmo Marconi. In 1925, the company was renamed Canadian Marconi Company. In 1948, English Electric purchased the UK based Marconi Company and in 1953 acquired 50.6% of Canadian Marconi Company.

In 1968, English Electric was itself purchased by General Electric Company (GEC), which took control of the 50.6% share of CMC.

On November 30, 1999, British Aerospace completed its purchase of GEC's Canadian Electronic Systems to form BAE Systems. In December 1999, BAE Systems purchased GEC's 51.6% share of CMC in a separate transaction. In February 2000 the company changed its name to BAE Systems Canada. In April 2001, ONCAP (an investment group comprising Onex Corporation and other investors) completed its purchase of BAE Systems Canada. The company was then renamed CMC Electronics since it had previously sold its rights for the Marconi name to Marconi plc. In 2007, CMC Electronics was sold to Esterline Corporation. Transdigm bought Esterline in 2019.

== Company structure ==
CMC has three primary operating business units: Navigation Systems, Cockpit System Integration, Panels and Sensors. It has an approximate 50/50 split between commercial and military sales.

== See also ==
- Bombardier Aerospace
- COM DEV International
- Héroux-Devtek
- MacDonald, Dettwiler and Associates
- Spar Aerospace
- Viking Air
