= Marconi Communications =

Telecommunications technology company

- Type: Subsidiary
- Industry: Telecommunications
- Predecessor: GEC Plessey Telecommunications (GPT)
- Founded: 1998; 28 years ago
- Defunct: 2005
- Fate: Acquired
- Successor: Ericsson; Telent
- Owner: GEC (1998–1999); Marconi plc (1999–2003); Marconi Corporation plc (2003–2006)
- Website: marconi.com at the Wayback Machine (archived 2005-06-02)

Marconi Communications was the telecommunications arm of Britain's General Electric Company plc (GEC) between 1998 and 2005.

It was founded in August 1998 through the amalgamation of GEC Plessey Telecommunications (GPT) with other GEC subsidiaries: Marconi SpA, GEC Hong Kong, and ATC South Africa. One year later, it became the principal subsidiary of Marconi plc, formed by renaming the remainder of GEC when GEC's defence arm, Marconi Electronic Systems, was sold to British Aerospace to form BAE Systems. Shortly thereafter, Marconi used the cash raised by selling its defence arm to purchase the US telecoms companies RELTEC Corporation and FORE Systems with the aim of becoming a major telecommunications systems provider. To this end, it entered into a series of deals and partnerships, including with the British railway infrastructure company Railtrack, to provide telecoms infrastructure. However, Marconi was perceived as slow to recognise the end of the dot-com bubble, and was compelled to implement cutbacks, which included 4,000 job cuts, as a result of fiscal underperformance while carrying a high debt burden. In June 2001, Marconi sold its Ipsaris network backbone business to Easynet via an all-share deal worth in excess of £300 million.

During May 2003, Marconi was restructured to Marconi Corporation plc and undertook a debt-for-equity swap. Months later, it sold its sizeable stake in Easynet to reduce corporate debts. During 2005, despite having been widely viewed as a strong candidate for BT's 21st Century Network (21CN) programme, Marconi Corporation failed to secure any work. Shortly thereafter, the Swedish telecommunications company Ericsson acquired much of the firm, while the remainder of Marconi Corporation was renamed Telent.

== History ==
Companies with "Marconi" in their name can trace their origins through a complex history of mergers, takeovers and divisions, to the 1963-established Marconi Company Ltd, founded in 1897 as the Wireless Telegraph & Signal Company by Guglielmo Marconi. The operations of Marconi were amalgamated into GEC in 1968, when GEC acquired the parent company of Marconi, English Electric.

=== Background: GEC acquisition of Plessey and GPT (1986–1998) ===
The evolution of Marconi Communications began in 1986, when the General Electric Company (GEC) attempted a takeover of Plessey, a British-based international electronics, defence and telecommunications company founded in 1917. The takeover bid was barred by regulatory authorities. As an amicable solution, GEC and Plessey merged their telecommunications businesses on 1 April 1988 as GEC Plessey Telecommunications (GPT). GPT was a world leader in many fields, for example synchronous digital hierarchy technology, and this brought together the two companies responsible for developing and building the System X telephone exchange, which was supposed to make selling System X simpler.

In 1989, GEC and the German conglomerate Siemens AG acquired the Plessey Company through their joint holding company, GEC Siemens plc. While most of Plessey's assets were divided between the companies (see: Plessey § Break-up of the business), GPT remained a joint venture, with a 60/40 shareholding by GEC and Siemens, respectively. GEC Plessey Telecommunications was renamed to "GPT", which would continue to exist merely as a legal entity.

During the mid-1990s, the name GPT gradually disappeared in the UK. By October 1997, the joint venture, through a series of Siemens mergers and acquisitions in the UK, evolved into Siemens GEC Communication Systems, which in 1998 merged with Siemens Business Communication Systems to form the largest division of Siemens AG: Siemens Communications.

In August 1998, GEC acquired Siemens' 40% stake in GPT (at this point only existing as a legal entity) in exchange for £700 million, after which it merged GPT with the telecoms units of its other subsidiaries – Marconi SpA, GEC Hong Kong, and ATC South Africa – to form Marconi Communications.

=== Marconi Communications (1999–2003) ===
In December 1999, GEC's defence arm, Marconi Electronic Systems, was sold to British Aerospace, forming BAE Systems. The remainder of GEC was renamed Marconi, and Marconi Communications became its principal subsidiary.

Following the announcement of the Marconi Electronic Systems demerger on 19 January 1999, GEC focused on the booming telecoms sector. It purchased two American equipment-makers to complement its existing telecommunications businesses: RELTEC Corporation (March 1999) and FORE Systems (April 1999). Both acquisitions occurred during the peak of the dot-com bubble. The £2.8 billion price for FORE Systems and the £1.3n spent on RELTEC took a heavy toll on Marconi following the bursting of the bubble in 2000/2001; particularly as both companies were loss-making and had less than £300 million in assets between them.

In September 2000, Marconi and Nortel Networks announced the formation of Enterprise Technology Centres in San Jose, California; Vienna, Virginia; and Israel.

During October 1999, it was announced that Marconi had been awarded a contract to supply a GSM-based communications network for Britain's West Coast Main Line railway; this telecommunications package was reportedly intended to be compatible with the European Rail Traffic Management System. In December 2000, it was announced that Marconi and British railway infrastructure company Railtrack had partnered up to develop a mobile phone network via a newly-formed joint venture called Euromast; it reportedly planned to deploy around five thousand 3G-compatible masts across railway-adjacent land owned by Railtrack, which would receive a 15 percent stake in Ipsaris, Mariconi's high-capacity optical network subsidiary.

In the first half of 2001, some of Marconi's major competitors such as Lucent Technologies and Alcatel had issued profit warnings, citing a large drop in orders from large telecoms groups. Marconi executives meanwhile reassured investors; the Financial Times judged they were "either failing to see the warning signs, or ignoring them." However, during late June and early July, it became evident that group sales had suffered a steep decline and, by 3 July, it was clear that a profits warning was inevitable. This was complicated by the fact that Marconi was to announce the sale of its medical unit to Philips in exchange for $1.1 billion. The company's shares would have to be suspended so that investors could not trade its shares without full information. At 7.26am on Wednesday 4 July, the Philips transaction was announced, and Marconi announced the suspension of its shares 15 minutes later. Following a contentious board meeting that evening, Marconi announced 4,000 job cuts, a 15 percent drop in sales forecasts, and a 50 percent fall in operating profit to March 2002. When trading resumed the following day, the share price dropped 54 percent, reducing the company's valuation to £2.8 billion, compared to £35.5 billion in September 2000. John Mayo, the deputy chief executive, was dismissed as a result. A second profits warning in September 2001 led to the dismissal of Lord Simpson (the CEO) and Sir Roger Hurn (chairman).

In June 2001, Marconi sold its Ipsaris business to Easynet in an all-share deal worth over £300 million. At the time, Ipsaris owned one of the largest backbones in the UK, comprising 3,500 kilometres of optical fibre that mainly ran alongside the canal network. As a result of this transaction, Marconi owned a 72 percent stake in Easynet. However, by March 2002, demand for space on the Easynet network had slumped and Easynet opted to effectively mothball the Ipsaris fibre optic network, writing down its value from £350 million to £15 million. One month later, Marconi was ordered by the High Court to deposit more than £20 million with the court to cover a claim against it by Railtrack over a contractual 'put' option that could compel Marconi to purchase its stake in Easynet Group for that amount. In December 2002, following a countersuit by Marconi, the lengthy legal dispute with Railtrack was resolved by Marconi withdrawing from the Ultramast joint venture and receiving £45 million in cash.

=== Marconi Corporation (2003–2005) ===
On 19 May 2003, Marconi underwent a major restructuring, being rebranded as Marconi Corporation around this time. Through a debt-for-equity swap, the firm's creditors received 99.5 percent of the new company's shares, while Marconi shareholders received one Marconi Corporation share for every 559 Marconi shares.

In July 2003, Marconi sold 32 percent of its stake in Easynet for £40.5 million and, during September 2003, the firm sold its remaining 40 percent stake in exchange for £56.7 million, in order to reduce Marconi's debts and increase liquidity. In October 2003, the company announced that it intended to pursue listing on the Nasdaq.

The company was a major supplier of asynchronous transfer mode, gigabit Ethernet, and Internet Protocol products. As such, it was viewed as a strong candidate to receive work on BT's 21st Century Network (21CN) programme; prior to the announcement of the winners of contracts, analyst Dresdner Kleinwort Wasserstein stated that: "[Marconi is] so advanced with its products and so entrenched with BT Group that its selection looks certain." However, during 2005, the firm failed to secure any part of the 21CN programme, a major surprise to suppliers and the market, sending the company's shares tumbling by 40 percent.

During early-to-mid 2005, various bids were reportedly being made for Marconi, including one by the Chinese firm Huawei Technologies, with whom Marconi already had a joint venture. Other parties were speculated to include the French telecommunications firm Alcatel and the German engineering company Siemens. Ultimately, in October 2005, the majority of Marconi Corporation's businesses, including Marconi Communications, were sold to the Swedish telecommunications company Ericsson in exchange for £1.2 billion; the remainder of the firm was renamed Telent.

== Sponsorship ==
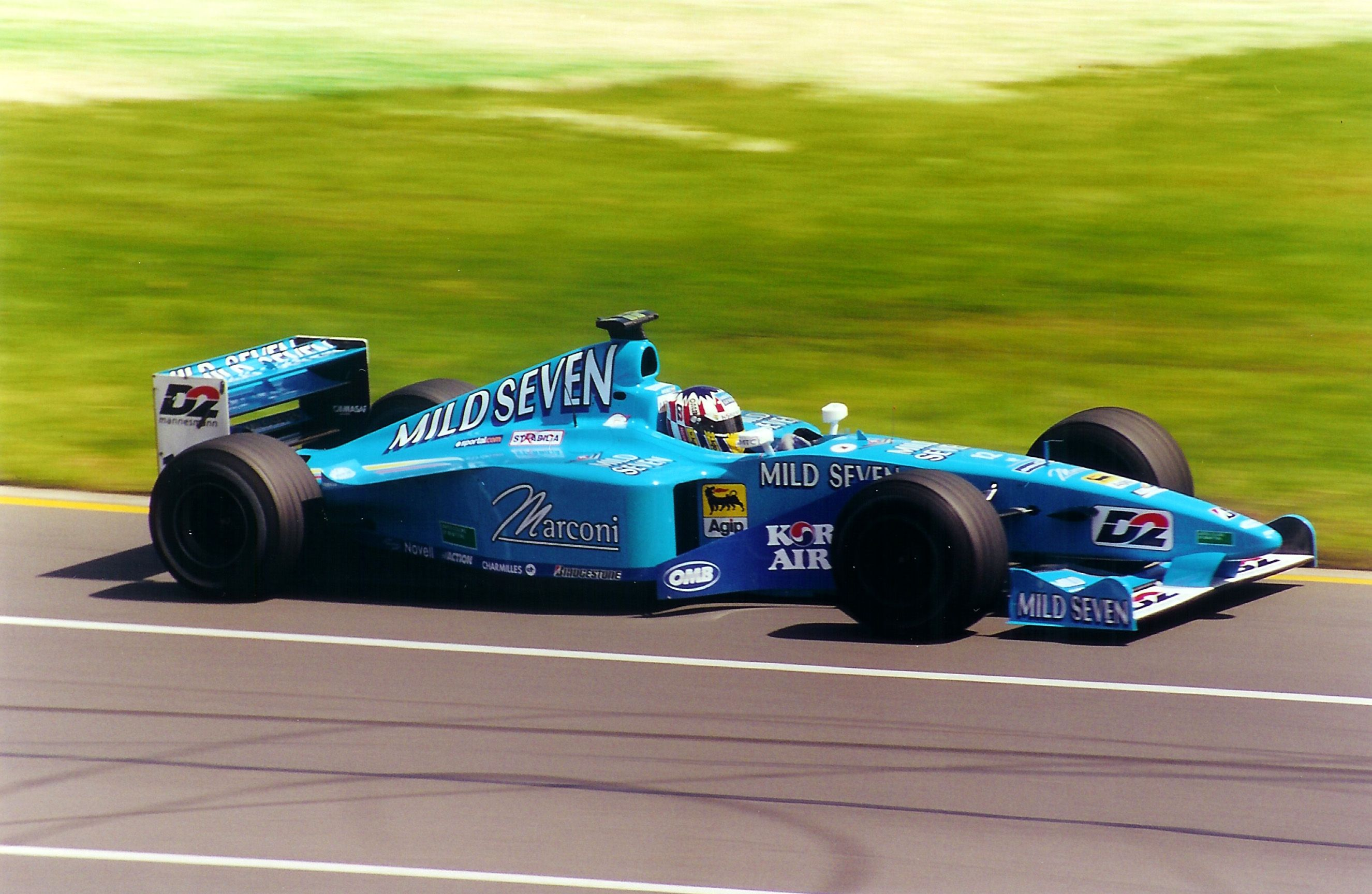
Marconi sponsorship on Alex Wurz's Benetton B200

In early 2000, Marconi launched a multimillion-pound sponsorship agreement with the Benetton Formula One team. Marconi's logos were featured prominently on the B200 and B201 cars, and driver suits. The sponsorship agreement was for three years, but ended after two years due to lack of funds.
