= Esterline =

Aerospace company

Esterline Technologies
- Type: Subsidiary
- Traded as: NYSE: ESL
- Industry: Aerospace; Defense; Gaming; Medical
- Founded: Indianapolis, Indiana, 1906
- Founder: John Esterline
- Headquarters: Bellevue, Washington
- Number of locations: Over 50 locations
- Area served: Worldwide
- Key people: Curtis Reusser, CEO
- Revenue: $2.035 billion (2018) $2.035 billion (2017)
- Number of employees: Over 12,000
- Parent: TransDigm Group
- Divisions: Avionics & Controls; Sensors & Systems; Advanced Materials
- Website: esterline.com

Esterline Technologies Corporation was a publicly traded company that designs, manufactures, and markets specialty products primarily for aerospace and defense customers. The company is best known as a supplier of products and equipment for aerospace companies such as Boeing and Airbus; and for American and allied military forces.

Esterline is based in Bellevue, Washington. Curtis Reusser serves as company chairman, president, and CEO.

On March 14, 2019, TransDigm successfully completed the acquisition of Esterline Technologies Corporation (formerly NYSE:ESL).

== History ==
=== Early history ===
Esterline was founded in 1906 by John Esterline, an electrical engineer and former head of the electrical engineering department at Purdue University. Esterline originally made magnets and recording devices. The company was renamed the Esterline-Angus Company when Esterline began working with Donald J. Angus.

Esterline-Angus merged with Boyar-Schultz, Inc., a manufacturer of surface grinding materials, in 1967. The newly merged company was renamed Esterline Corporation. Esterline went public in 1968. Later that year, the company entered the aerospace and defense sectors with its acquisition of Babcock Electronics.

The company began acquiring medical supply and equipment companies in 1969. By the early 1970s, the company held businesses specializing in ophthalmic goods and hearing aids. The company had sold the majority of its healthcare businesses and subsidiaries by 1978 when Esterline sold its hearing aid manufacturing business. After exiting the healthcare sector, Esterline had acquired 20 additional companies by 1986.

=== Aerospace and defense ===
In 1987, after releasing poor financial reports, the Esterline board dismissed the company's entire executive team including then-chief executive officer Thomas Howes. Later that year, Esterline appointed seven new senior officers, all of whom were affiliated with Criton Technologies, an aerospace manufacturer. Criton Technologies was wholly owned by Dyson-Kissner-Moran (DKM), a New York City-based investment firm that had also been Esterline's largest shareholder since the firm bought Esterline in 1967 and took it public in 1968. Carroll Martenson, Criton's chairman, was appointed chairman and CEO of Esterline. Esterline also relocated from Darien, Connecticut, to Bellevue, Washington, in order to share its headquarters with Criton Technologies. The company had been located in Darien, Connecticut since 1975.

The new management team reorganized the company and sold underperforming businesses and subsidiaries. In 1989, Esterline purchased DKM's remaining 23% share in the company and Criton Technologies' aerospace and defense businesses for a collective $147.5 million. The company was then renamed Esterline Technologies.

By the early 1990s Esterline operated in ten separate industries and the company refocused itself on the defense and aerospace sectors. Esterline also changed chief executives in 1992, with company president and COO Wendell Hurlbut succeeding the retiring Carroll Martenson. Robert Cremin succeeded Hurlbut in January 1999. Cremin had served in executive positions for the company for 22 years, and had most recently served as company president and COO.

From 1997 to 2003, Esterline acquired 22 companies while selling businesses that did not fit the company's new focus. Esterline's acquisitions included Fluid Regulators Corporation, a manufacturer of hydrologic controls for the commercial aviation and defense industries; Kai R. Kuhl Company, a manufacturer of seals for the aerospace industry; Kirkhill Rubber, a manufacturer of custom molded engineered elastomers for the aerospace industry; and Advanced Input Devices, a manufacturer of custom keyboards and multifunction data-input subsystems. The company also expanded its European business with acquisitions of Muirhead Vactric and Norcroft Dynamics, two United Kingdom-based manufacturers of aerospace parts.

Esterline continued its acquisition push into the defense and aerospace industries throughout the 2000s. In 2002, the company acquired the BAE Systems' North American electronic warfare countermeasures business. The deal consisted of two facilities, which manufactured anti-radar chaff and aircraft-dispensable flares designed to thwart infrared homing missiles. The company purchased Leach International in 2004 for $145 million. Esterline had been attempting to acquire Leach since 1994 and the deal was Esterline's largest acquisition at the time. Leach was a manufacturer of controls and analytical instruments for aerospace and medical diagnostics.

Esterline acquired Darchem Holdings, a British manufacturer of thermally engineered aerospace and defense products including ducting systems and heat shields, in 2005. That year, 80% of Esterline's revenue came from the company's aerospace and defense business, up from 17% in 1995. In 2006, Esterline purchased Wallop Defence, a British manufacturer of electronic warfare countermeasures, including flares. The company then acquired CMC Electronics, a Canadian aerospace and defense avionics manufacturer in 2007 for $335 million (USD).

In 2009, Esterline acquired Racal Acoustics, a British manufacturer of combat communications equipment ranging from noise-canceling communication headsets to secure telephone networks for use in active battlefields. R. Bradley "Brad" Lawrence succeeded Robert Cremin as Esterline CEO in November of that year. Lawrence had worked at Esterline since 2002, most recently serving as company president and COO since June 2009. Cremin stepped aside to take on the Chairmanship of Dover Corporation.

Esterline continued its expansion into the military communications and intelligence, surveillance and reconnaissance (ISR) markets with its purchase of Eclipse Electronic Systems, a manufacturer of signal and communication intelligence hardware for aerospace applications in 2011. Later that year, Esterline acquired the Souriau Group, a French aerospace and defense connector company, for $715 million.

In September 2013, Esterline appointed Curtis Reusser to succeed Brad Lawrence as the company's CEO. Reusser had formerly served as president of United Technologies Corporation's aircraft systems business. Esterline then acquired Joslyn Sunbank Company, an aerospace connector accessory supplier, a few months later in December 2013. In February 2015, Esterline acquired the defense and aerospace division of the Belgium-based display manufacturer, Barco. In February 2017, the company announced a new advanced displays engineering and manufacturing facility in Kortrjik, Belgium called the "Spidle" site.

Esterline is the producer of the well known Korry switches and control devices used in most airliners and flight simulators on the market, including Airbus, Boeing and others.

== Corporate structure ==
Esterline manufactures products for the aerospace, defense and general industry sectors. The company is organized into three segments: Avionics & Controls; Sensors & Systems; and Advanced Materials.

The Avionics & Controls segment manufactures avionics equipment and communication systems for both commercial and military applications. The Sensors & Systems segment manufactures connectors, sensors and power management systems, which are primarily used in the aerospace industry. The Advanced Materials segment manufactures elastomer products and thermal components for commercial and military applications; and military ordnance and electronic warfare countermeasures.

== Acquisitions ==
- 2003 - Weston Group
- 2003 - AVISTA, Incorporated
- 2004 - Leach International
- 2005 - Palomar Products, Inc.
- 2005 - Darchem Engineering Limited
- 2006 - Wallop Defence Systems Ltd.
- 2007 - CMC Electronics Inc.
- 2008 - NMC Aerospace (Nylon Molding Corporation)
- 2009 - Racal Acoustics
- 2010 - Eclipse Electronic System
- 2011 - Souriau
- 2013 - Gamesman
- 2013 - Sunbank
- 2015 - Barco Defense and Aerospace
