= AXE telephone exchange =

Telephone exchange systems by Ericsson

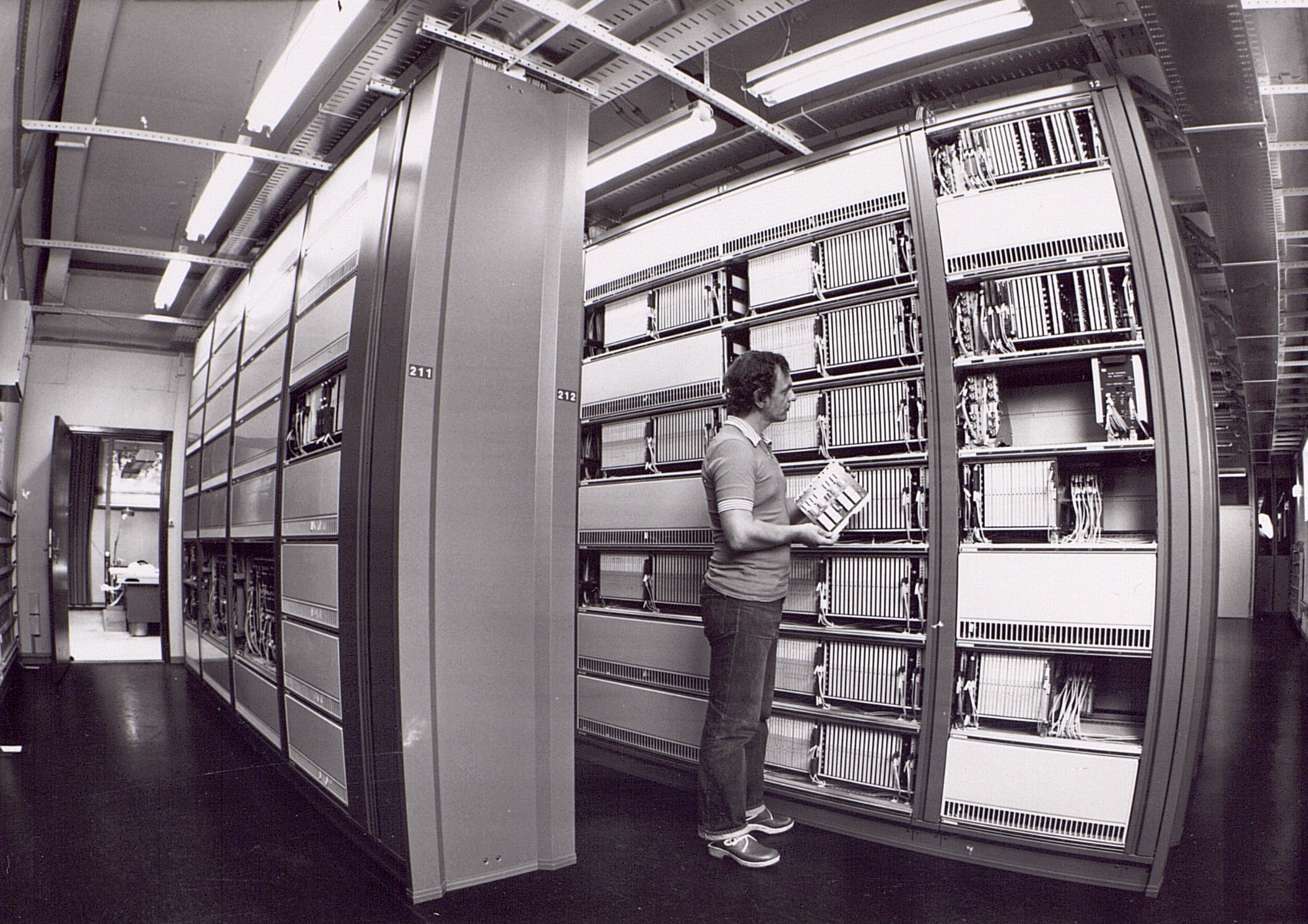
Ericsson digital AXE telephone exchange in the 1980s

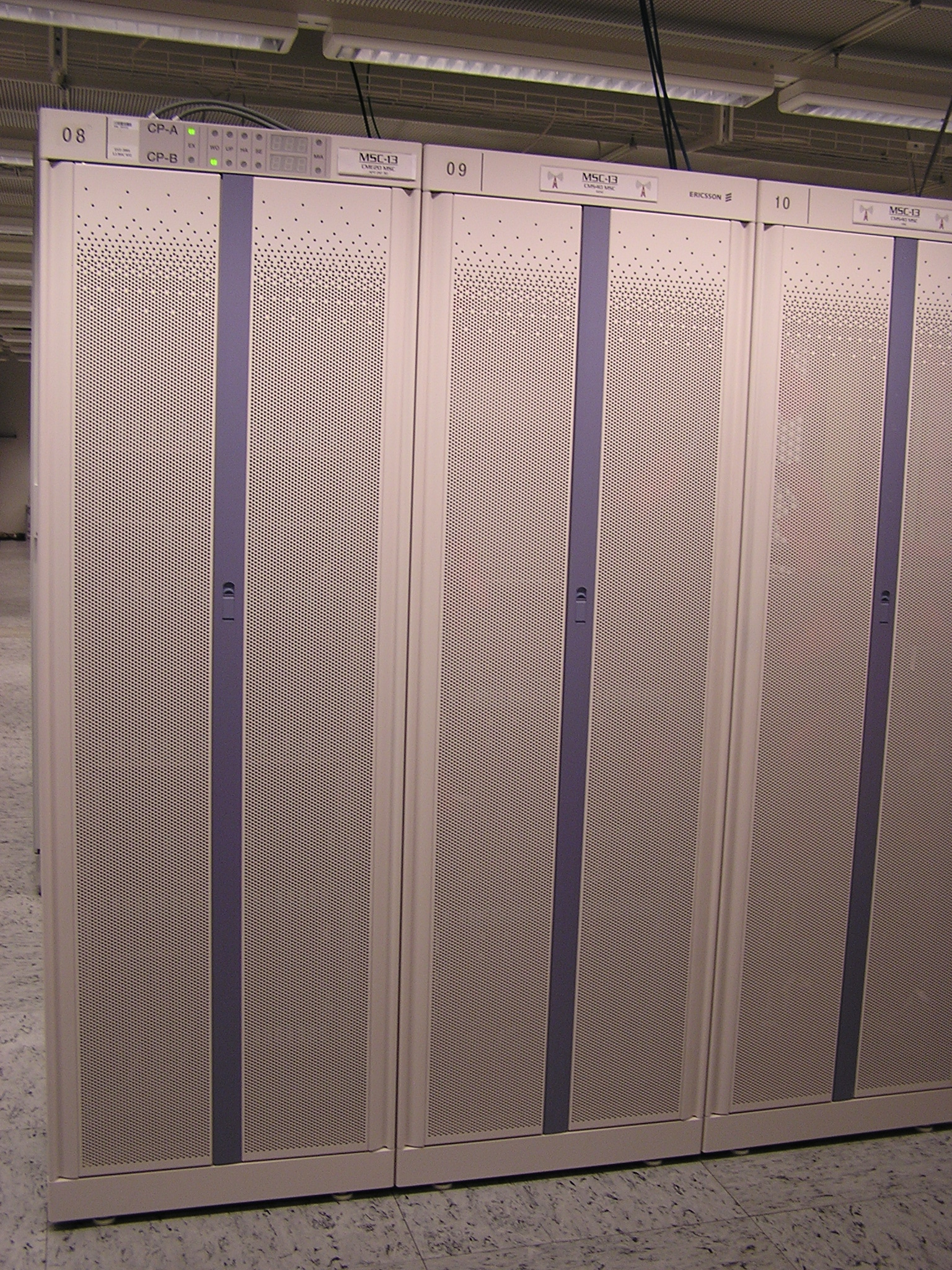
Ericsson AXE cabinets

The AXE telephone exchange is a product line of electronic switching systems for digital circuit switching telephone exchanges developed by the Swedish telecom company Ericsson. It was designed in 1974 by Ellemtel, a research and development subsidiary of Ericsson and Televerket. The first system was deployed in 1976. It is used for connecting local landlines, operating mobile networks (TDMA, GSM, CDMA, W-CDMA, PDC), international telephony traffic and signaling.

AXE is the Ericsson product code for the digital successor to the AKE analogue central office and the ARF/ARM family of crossbar switches. The design is modular with an APZ dual processor running in sync mode, an APT switching part and an APG I/O part. AXE-based systems are used as BSC/TRC, MSC, HLR, SCP, FNR, TSC, STP and wireline nodes.

The central comtrol of an AXE system is a dual processor system, called APZ. It runs in parallel sync mode making it fault redundant. The family of APZs started with APZ 210 03 in 1976; the latest one is APZ 214 03. The parallel sync mode was partly abandoned in the APZ 212 40 and subsequent models and has been replaced with a warm standby scheme.

The latest APZ type is 214 03 which is used as MSC, TSC and HLR Blade in AXE. The latest implementation of AXE is on a blade cluster system capable of handling up to 8 million subscribers.

The core of the switching part was the Group Switch, initially a time-space-time multiplexer capable of switching up to 64K positions or connections. This Group Switch later evolved to a Distributed Group Switch using Time-Space switching technique with a maximum capacity of 512K.

AXE nodes have evolved as a traffic controller, having the new Media Gateway node running on CPP platform handle the payload traffic.

Ericsson AXE telephone exchanges support lawful intercepts via the remote-control equipment subsystem (RES), which carries out the tap, and the interception management system (IMS), software used for initiating the tap, which adds the tap to the RES database. In a fully operating lawful interception system the RES and IMS both create logs of all numbers being tapped so that system administrators can perform audits to find unauthorized taps.

Code is written in PLEX (a proprietary programming language tied to the AXE hardware, designed by Göran Hemdahl), SDL and ASA210C programming languages. Code for Regional Processors (controlling hardware Extension Modules) is written in ASA210R.

AXE switches used in the United Kingdom are sometimes referred to as System Y as they were the first competitive alternative to the domestically developed System X digital switching system.

== See also ==
- Greek telephone tapping case 2004-2005
