= Marconi Electronic Systems =

Defence arm of the defunct General Electric Company (1897-1999)

Marconi Electronic Systems Limited
- Founded: 20 July 1897; 129 years ago (as Marconi Company)
- Defunct: November 30, 1999
- Fate: Merged with British Aerospace
- Successor: BAE Systems
- Headquarters: Chelmsford, England
- Key people: Guglielmo Marconi; Arnold Weinstock
- Parent: General Electric Company

Marconi Electronic Systems Limited (MES), or GEC-Marconi as it was until 1998, was the defence arm of General Electric Company (GEC). It was split off from GEC and bought by British Aerospace (BAe) on 30 November 1999 to form BAE Systems. GEC then renamed itself Marconi plc.

MES exists today as BAE Systems Electronics Limited, a subsidiary of BAE Systems, but the assets were rearranged elsewhere within that company. MES-related businesses include BAE Systems Submarine Solutions, BAE Systems Surface Ships, BAE Systems Insyte and Selex ES (now a part of Leonardo).

== History ==
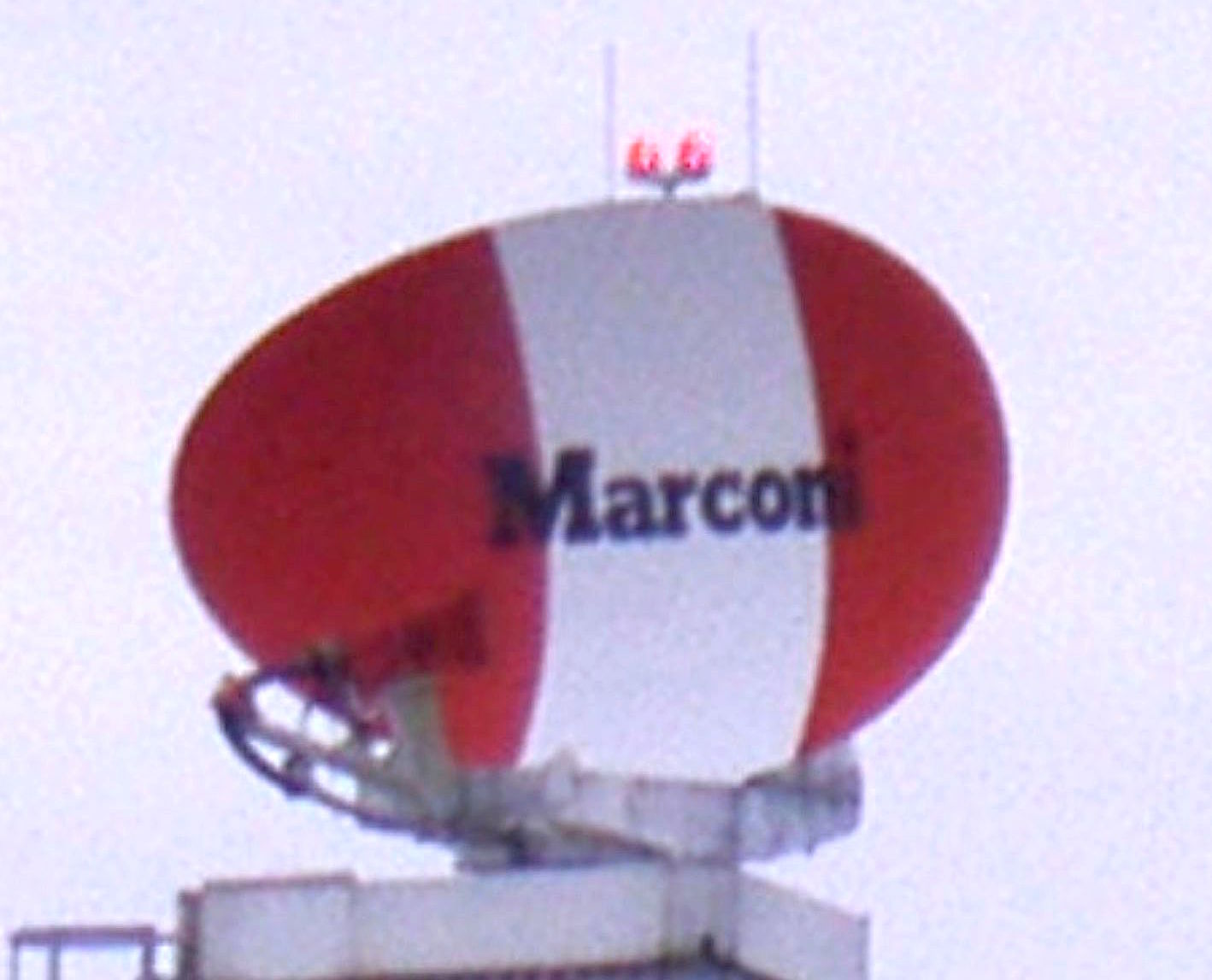
Marconi S511 radar located at Norwich International Airport

The Marconi Company had been formed by Guglielmo Marconi in 1897 in Britain, originally under the name of The Wireless Telegraph & Signal Company. Following GEC's acquisition of Marconi as part of English Electric in 1968, the Marconi brand was used for its defence businesses, e.g. Marconi Space & Defence Systems (MSDS), Marconi Underwater Systems Ltd (MUSL).

When it was acquired by GEC, MES represented the pinnacle of the company's defence businesses, which had a heritage of almost 100 years. GEC's history of military products dates back to World War I with its contribution to the war effort then including radios and bulbs. World War II consolidated this position with the company involved in many important technological advances, most notably radar.

Between 1945 and GEC's demerger of its defence business in 1999, the company became a major defence contractor. GEC's major defence related acquisitions included Associated Electrical Industries in 1967, English Electric Company (including Marconi as a subsidiary) in 1968, Yarrow Shipbuilders in 1985, parts of Ferranti's defence business in 1990, Vickers Shipbuilding and Engineering in 1995 and Kvaerner Govan in 1999. In June 1998, MES acquired Tracor, a major American defence contractor, for US$1.4 billion.

=== Demerger ===
The 1997 merger of American corporations Boeing and McDonnell Douglas, which followed the forming of Lockheed Martin, the world's largest defence contractor in 1995, increased the pressure on European defence companies to consolidate. In June 1997, British Aerospace Defence managing director John Weston commented "Europe... is supporting three times the number of contractors on less than half the budget of the U.S.". European governments wished to see the merger of their defence manufacturers into a single entity, a European Aerospace and Defence Company.

As early as 1995, British Aerospace and the German aerospace and defence company DaimlerChrysler Aerospace (DASA) were said to be keen to create a transnational aerospace and defence company. Merger discussions began between British Aerospace and DASA in July 1998. A merger was agreed between British Aerospace chairman Richard Evans and DASA CEO Jürgen Schrempp in December 1998.

GEC was also under pressure to participate in defence industry consolidation. Reporting the appointment of George Simpson as GEC managing director in 1996, The Independent had said "some analysts believe that Mr Simpson's inside knowledge of BAe, a long-rumoured GEC bid target, was a key to his appointment. GEC favours forging a national "champion" defence group with BAe to compete with the giant US organisations". When GEC put MES up for sale on 22 December 1998, BAE abandoned the DASA merger in favour of purchasing its British rival. The merger of British Aerospace and MES was announced on 19 January 1999. Evans stated that in 2004 that his fear was that an American defence contractor would acquire MES and challenge both British Aerospace and DASA. The merger created a vertically integrated company which The Scotsman described as "[a combination of British Aerospace's] contracting and platform-building skills with Marconi's coveted electronics systems capability". for example combining the manufacturer of the Eurofighter with the company that provided many of the aircraft's electronic systems; British Aerospace was MES' largest customer. In contrast, DASA's response to the breakdown of the merger discussion was to merge with Aérospatiale to create the European Aeronautic Defence and Space Company (EADS), a horizontal integration. EADS has since considered a merger with Thales to create a "fully rounded" company.

While MES was responsible for the majority of GEC's defence sales other GEC companies achieved defence related sales, principally GEC Alsthom, GEC-Plessey Telecommunications (GPT) and GEC Plessey Semiconductors.

== Organisation ==
- Marconi Avionics
- Marconi North America
- Marconi Naval Systems
- Alenia Marconi Systems (AMS)
- Matra Marconi Space
- Thomson Marconi Sonar
- Marconi Research Centre
- Marconi Radar Systems
- Marconi Communications Systems

== Major projects ==
This is a partial list:

- Produced 12 of the class of 16 Type 23 frigates. Also the major electronics and equipment supplier for the class.
- Civil avionics, e.g. Boeing 777 fly-by-wire systems
- UK prime contractor on the Horizon CNGF programme until 1999. Following the withdrawal of the UK from the programme, MES was awarded the subsequent Type 45 destroyer prime contractor position several days before merging with BAe.
- Part of Raytheon ASTOR bid team
- Royal Navy Astute-class fleet submarines
- Brimstone Anti-Armour Missile
- TIALD laser designator pod
- AI.24 Foxhunter, radar for the Tornado
- ECR-90, radar for the Eurofighter Typhoon.
- Member of Boeing X-32 JSF development team
- Battlefield Artillery Target Engagement System (BATES) for use with MLRS and AS-90

=== Naval weapons ===
- Spearfish torpedo
- Sting Ray torpedo

=== Spacecraft ===
- Ariel 6
- Prospero X-3
- Zircon (satellite)

== See also ==
- Aerospace industry in the United Kingdom
- GEC-Marconi scientist deaths conspiracy theory – Article about the 25+ defence employees who have died in mysterious circumstances since the early 1980s
- CMC Electronics – formerly the Canadian Marconi Company, once part of EE/GEC & BAe
