= General Electric Company =

British engineering company (1886–1999)

General Electric Company plc
- Type: Public
- Industry: Engineering
- Founded: 1886; 140 years ago
- Defunct: 1999; 27 years ago
- Fate: Defence arm bought by British Aerospace to form BAE Systems (1999); GEC renamed Marconi (1999)
- Successor: BAE Systems plc; Marconi plc; Otis Worldwide Corporation; Alstom SA; Osram
- Headquarters: United Kingdom
- Key people: Hugo Hirst (founder); Lord Weinstock (managing director)
- Products: Electronics

The General Electric Company (GEC) was a major British industrial conglomerate involved in consumer and defence electronics, communications, and engineering.

It was founded in London in 1886 as an electrical goods wholesaler named G. Binswanger and Company, which quickly adopted a then-unorthodox business model of supplying electrical components over the counter. In 1889, the business was incorporated as the General Electric Company Ltd, and became a public limited company 11 years later. During the 1890s and 1900s, the company heavily invested into electric lighting, a sector that proved to be immensely profitable in the long term. The GEC was heavily impacted by the outbreak of the First World War, supplying various goods to the military, and thus becoming a major player in the electrical industry. In 1921, a new purpose-built company headquarters (Magnet House) was opened in Kingsway, London; two years later, GEC's industrial research laboratories at Wembley (later named the Hirst Research Centre) also opened. In the 1920s, the company was heavily involved in the creation and roll-out of Britain's National Grid.

During the Second World War, GEC made several significant contributions to the Allied war effort, such as the development of the cavity magnetron for radar, various advances in communications technology, and the mass production of valves, lamps, and lighting equipment. In 1961, GEC merged with Radio & Allied Industries. Throughout the mid-to-late 1960s, GEC's new managing director, Arnold Weinstock, sought to rationalise the British electrical industry and boost efficiency via a series of cut-backs and mergers that returned the company to profit. GEC acquired Associated Electrical Industries (AEI) in 1967, and merged with English Electric one year later. The company continued to expand via acquisitions; between 1979 and 1981, GEC acquired W & T Avery, Cincinnati Electronics, and Picker Corporation.

During the 1980s, the company was Britain's largest private employer with over 250,000 employees; becoming one of the first companies in the new FTSE 100 Index in 1984. It made profits in excess of £1 billion per year at its peak in the 1990s. In June 1998, GEC sold its share of the joint venture GEC-Alsthom on the Paris stock exchange. In December 1999, GEC's defence arm, Marconi Electronic Systems (MES), was sold to British Aerospace, forming BAE Systems. The rest of GEC, mainly telecommunications equipment manufacturing, continued as Marconi Communications. After buying several US telecoms manufacturers at the top of the market, losses following the bursting of the dot-com bubble in 2001 led to the restructuring in 2003 of Marconi plc into Marconi Corporation plc. In 2005, the company failed to secure any part of BT's 21st Century Network (21CN) programme; that same year, Ericsson acquired the bulk of the company, and what was left of the business was renamed Telent.

== History ==
=== Early years (1886–88) ===
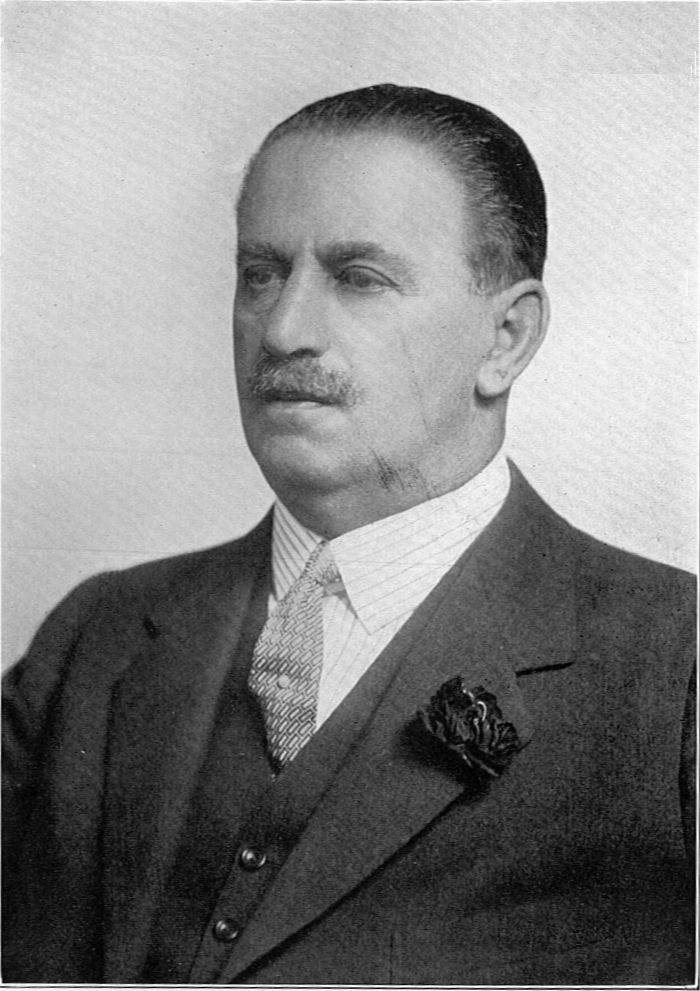
Hugo Hirst, c. 1930

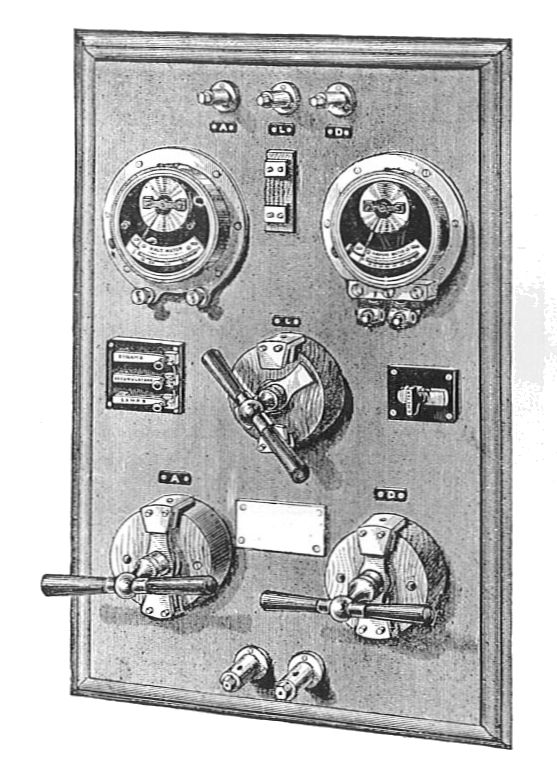
Early switchboard, c. 1888

GEC had its origins in the G. Binswanger and Company, an electrical goods wholesaler established in London in the 1880s by a German-Jewish immigrant, Gustav Binswanger (later Gustav Byng). In 1886, regarded as the year GEC was founded, Hugo Hirst – a fellow immigrant – joined Byng, and the company changed its name to The General Electric Apparatus Company (G. Binswanger).

Their small business found early success with its unorthodox method of supplying electrical components over the counter. Hirst was an entrepreneurial salesman who saw the potential of electricity and was able to direct the standardisation of an industry in its infancy. He travelled across Europe with an eye for the latest products, and in 1887 the company published the first electrical catalogue of its kind. The following year, the company acquired its first factory in Salford, where electric bells, telephones, ceiling roses and switches were manufactured.

=== Incorporation and expansion (1889–1913) ===
In 1889, the business was incorporated as a private company known as the General Electric Company Ltd. The company was expanding rapidly, opening new branches and factories and trading in 'everything electrical', a phrase that was to become synonymous with GEC.

In 1893, it decided to invest in the manufacture of lamps. The resulting company (to become Osram in 1909) was to lead the way in lamp design, and the burgeoning demand for electric lighting was to make GEC's fortune.

In 1900, GEC was incorporated as a public limited company, The General Electric Company (1900) Ltd (the '1900' was dropped three years later). In 1902, its first purpose-built factory, the Witton Engineering Works, was opened near Birmingham.

In 1907, GEC set up the Peel-Conner Telephone Works to manufacture telephone exchanges and telephones for the GPO; GEC supplied a large CB manual exchange for Glasgow in 1910. The British telephone system had been taken over and was operated by the General Post Office (GPO or BPO, a government department). The telephone manufacturing section moved from Manchester to Coventry in 1919, and GEC was one of the "ring" of four (later five) companies supplying the GPO with Strowger automatic telephone exchanges (called "Step-by-Step" or SXS) in use from the 1920s to the 1960s. In 1910, the meter department, also based at Peel Works, was incorporated separately as Salford Electrical Instruments.

On the death of Byng in 1910, Hirst became the chairman as well as managing director, a position he had assumed in 1906. Hirst's shrewd investment in lamp manufacture was proving extremely profitable. In 1909, Osram began production of the most successful tungsten filament lamps in the industry. Rapidly growing private and commercial use of electricity created huge demand. The company expanded both at home and overseas, with the establishment of agencies in Europe, Japan, Australia, South Africa, and India. It also did substantial trade with South America.

=== World Wars and post-WWII (1914–60) ===
The outbreak of the First World War transformed GEC into a major player in the electrical industry. The company was heavily involved in the war effort, supplying products such as radios, signal lamps, and the arc-lamp carbons used in searchlights.

During the interwar period, GEC expanded to become a global corporation and national institution. The takeover of Fraser and Chalmers in 1918 took GEC into heavy engineering and bolstered their claim to supply 'everything electrical'. In the same year, the maker of electricity meters, Chamberlain and Hookham, was also acquired by GEC.

In 1919, GEC merged its radio valve manufacturing interests with those of the Marconi Company to form the Marconi-Osram Valve Company.

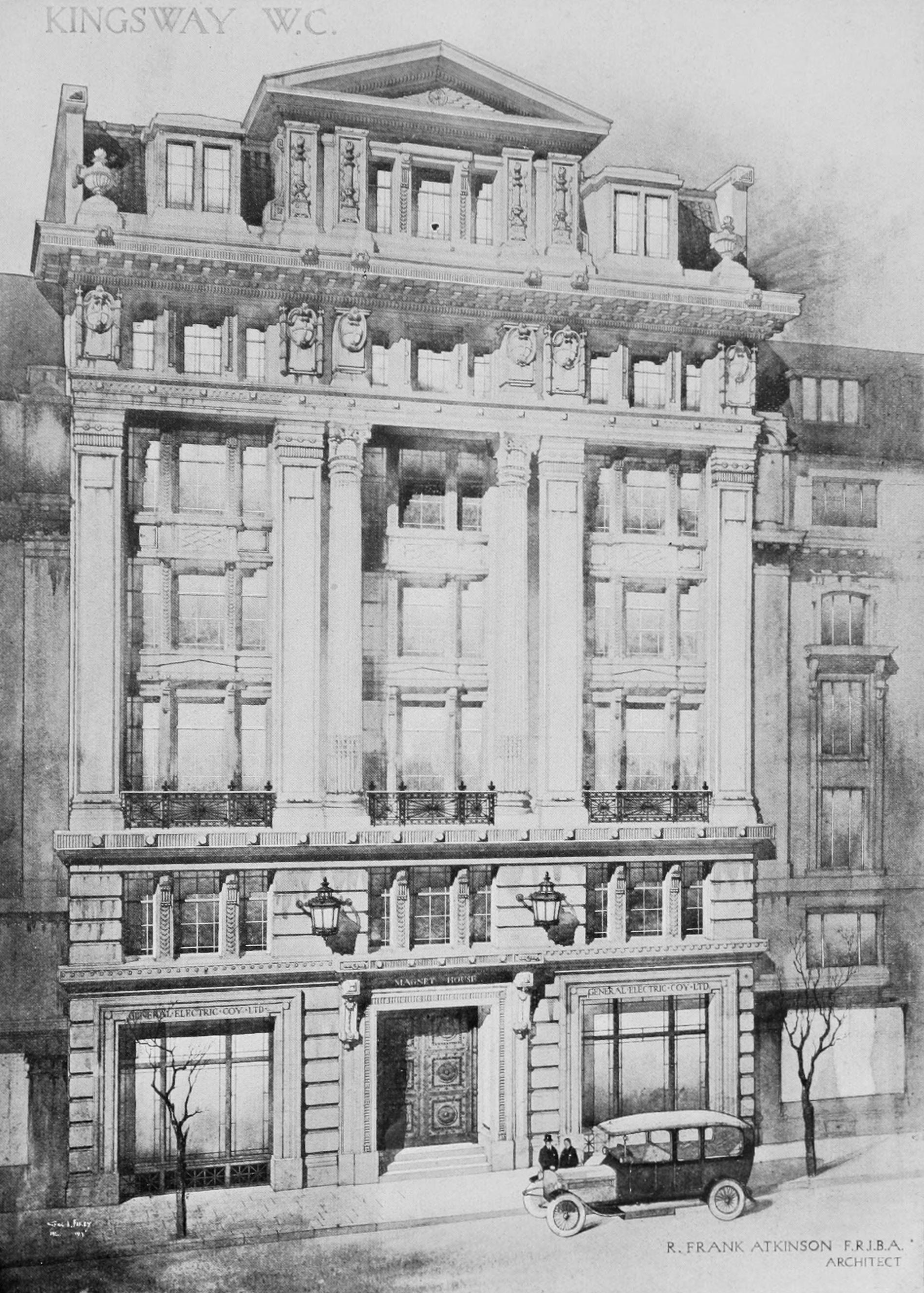
Magnet House, the company's 1920 headquarters at 45 Kingsway, designed by R. Frank Atkinson. It was demolished in 1964 to make way for Space House.

In the 1920s, the company was heavily involved in the creation of the UK-wide National Grid. The opening of a new purpose-built company headquarters (Magnet House) in Kingsway, London in 1921, and the pioneering industrial research laboratories at Wembley in 1923 (later named the Hirst Research Centre) were symbolic of the continuing expansion of both GEC and the electrical industry.

By 1927, GEC had acquired the Express Lift Company of Westminster. In 1930 another lift manufacturer – Smith, Major and Stevens – was merged into Express Lifts and production was moved to their Northampton factory, where a disused lift testing tower still stands.

During the Second World War, GEC was a major manufacturer of electrical and engineering products for the British armed forces. Significant contributions to the war effort included the development in 1940 of the cavity magnetron, the concept of which was established by Randall and Boot working at Birmingham University. Specifically, GEC engineers were able to dramatically increase the power output, reaching in excess of 100 kW by 1941 and close to one megawatt by 1943. These high power pulses, generated from a relatively compact device and transmitted from an antenna only centimeters long, substantially reduced the size of practical radar systems by orders of magnitude, permitting their installation in fighter aircraft. More generally, GEC also made advances in communications technology and the ongoing mass production of valves, lamps and lighting equipment.

The post-war years saw slower expansion. After the death of Hugo Hirst in 1943, his son-in-law Leslie Gamage (elder son of the founder of Gamages), along with Harry Railing, took over as joint managing directors. Despite the huge demand for electrical consumer goods, and large investments in heavy engineering and nuclear power, profits began to fall in the face of competition and internal disorganisation.

=== Further expansion (1961–83) ===
In 1961, GEC merged with Sir Michael Sobell's Radio & Allied Industries, and with it emerged the new power behind GEC, Sobell's son-in-law Arnold Weinstock, who became the managing director of GEC in 1963, and moved its headquarters from Kingsway to a new building at 1 Stanhope Gate in Mayfair.

Weinstock embarked on a programme to rationalise the entire British electrical industry, beginning with the internal rejuvenation of GEC. In a drive for efficiency, Weinstock made cut-backs and instigated mergers, resulting in new growth for the company. GEC returned to profit and the financial markets' confidence was restored.

During the late 1960s, the electrical industry was revolutionised as GEC acquired Associated Electrical Industries (AEI) in 1967, which encompassed Metropolitan-Vickers, British Thomson-Houston, Edison Swan, Siemens Brothers & Co, Hotpoint, William Thomas Henley and Birlec.

In 1968, GEC merged with English Electric, incorporating Elliott Brothers, the Marconi Company, Ruston & Hornsby, Robert Stephenson & Hawthorns, the Vulcan Foundry, Willans & Robinson and Dick, Kerr & Co. The Elliot computer company became GEC Computers, whose products were successful in academic computing and real-time process control in the 1970s and 1980s.

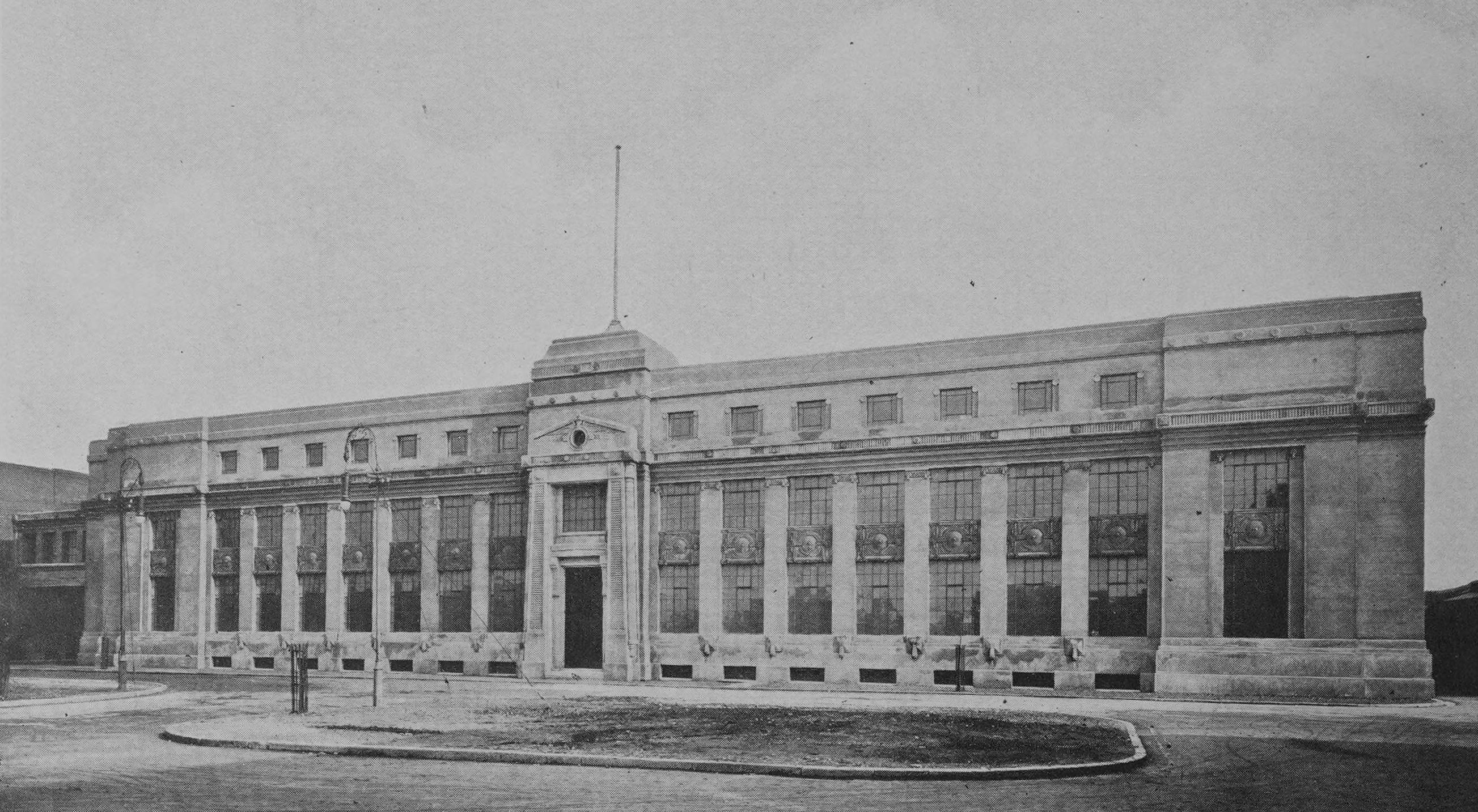
The 1922 administration at Witton, designed by Wallis, Gilbert and Partners

The Birmingham Witton works remained one of the company's biggest sites, producing high-voltage switchgear and transformers, large generators, small motors, mercury arc rectifiers and traction components, until the plant was gradually sold off by Weinstock in 1969.

In 1969, a new subsidiary company was born, English Electric-AEI Traction Ltd. This new organisation slowly integrated together the traction divisions of both AEI and EE, culminating in 1972 when the company was renamed GEC Traction Ltd. Also added to the company was the industrial locomotive division of the former English Electric which was based at Vulcan Works, Newton-le-Willows (this later became a separate company, GEC Industrial Locomotives Ltd). The company had manufacturing sites at Manchester, Preston and Sheffield.

The company continued to expand with the acquisition in 1979 of weighing machine maker W & T Avery, renamed GEC Avery.

In April 1981, GEC acquired Cincinnati Electronics (CE), in Cincinnati, Ohio, at the time owned by George J Mealey. CE was a leader in military radios and infrared technology, space electronics, and other high-security products, doing business throughout the world. (Now owned by L-3 Cincinnati Electronics.)

In 1981, GEC acquired Picker Corporation, an American manufacturer of medical imaging equipment. GEC merged Picker with Cambridge Instruments, GEC Medical, and American Optical to form Picker International (PI). GEC Medical was itself an amalgamation of Watson & Sons Ltd, formed in the early 20th century in London and long a part of GEC, and A E Dean & Co of Croydon. In 1982, PI introduced the first 1.0T magnetic resonance imaging (MRI) unit. In 1998, it acquired the CT division of Elscint In 1999, the company changed its name to Marconi Medical Systems. In 2001, Philips bought Marconi Medical Systems for $1.1 billion.

=== Acquisitions and mergers (1984–97) ===
In 1984, it became one of the first companies in the new FTSE 100 Index, ranking third in value behind British Petroleum and Shell Transport and Trading.

In 1985, GEC acquired Yarrow Shipbuilders from British Shipbuilders. In 1988, GEC Plessey Telecommunications (GPT) was created when GEC bought Plessey. The following year, GEC and Siemens formed a joint company, GEC Siemens plc, to take over Plessey. As part of the deal, GEC took control of Plessey's avionics and naval systems businesses.

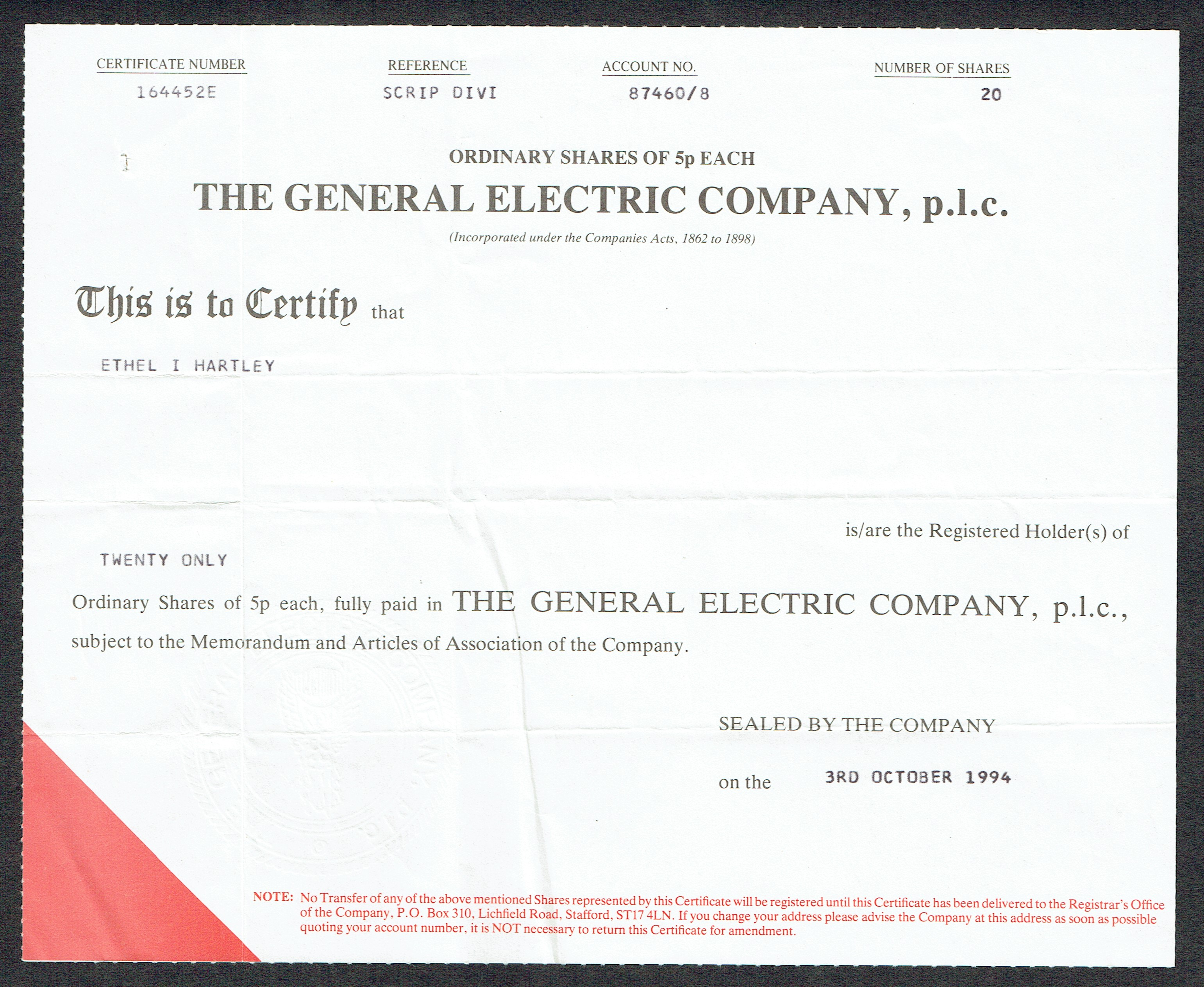
General Electric Company share certificate, issued in 1994

In early 1989, GEC and French company Alsthom merged their power generation and transport businesses in a new joint venture, GEC-Alsthom. In May 1989, GEC-Alsthom bought British rail vehicle manufacturer Metro-Cammell.

In early 1996, the Otis Elevator Company acquired The Express Lift Company from GEC. By the mid-1990s, GEC was making profits of £1 billion, had cash reserves of £3 billion, and was valued at £10 billion.

The move towards electronics and modern technology, particularly in the defence sector, was a departure from the domestic electrical goods market. GEC acquired the Edinburgh based Ferranti Defence Systems Group in 1990 as well as part of Ferranti International's assets in Italy. It also bought Vickers Shipbuilding & Engineering (VSE) in 1995. VSE was willing to participate in a merger with a larger company to reduce its exposure to cycles in warship production, particularly in light of the post-Cold War "Options for Change" defence review. Following GEC's purchase, VSE became Marconi Marine.

During 1996, Lord Weinstock retired as GEC's managing director and was replaced by George Simpson. In July 1997, the company announced the outcomes of a major review: it would move away from its joint ventures and focus on moving toward "global leadership" in defence and aerospace (Marconi Electronic Systems), industrial electronics (GEC Industrial Electronics), and communications (GEC Communications). Simpson, along with finance director John Mayo, decided to pursue a risky strategy of pursuing fast growth via rapid acquisition of numerous other companies, particularly within the United States.

In February 1998, Marconi Instruments, the test equipment arm of GEC, was sold to IFR Systems.

In March 1998, GEC announced the merger of its radar and avionics business with Alenia Difesa to form Alenia Marconi Systems.

In June 1998, it completed the $1.4bn acquisition of major American defence contractor Tracor, which became part of MES. The same month, GEC sold its share of the joint venture GEC-Alsthom on the Paris stock exchange.

After most of its US acquisitions failed, GEC began to make a loss. The cash reserves that Lord Weinstock had built up during the 1980s and early 1990s had been all but depleted, and the company was heavily in debt.

=== Marconi Electronic Systems sale (1998–99) ===
In July 1998, reports began linking British Aerospace (BAe) with the German aerospace group DASA to create a new European Aerospace and Defence Company. GEC was also seen as a potential partner in a three-way merger with BAe and DASA.

In December 1998, reports emerged that GEC was seeking a partner for MES, the value of which was greatly increased by the Tracor acquisition. Prospective partners included Thomson-CSF (by 1998 on the path to privatisation) and various American defence contractors (e.g. Lockheed Martin and TRW). GEC had already been active in pursuing consolidation in the defence business. In 1997, it made an ultimately unsuccessful bid to the French government to privatise Thomson-CSF and merge it with MES.

A merger of UK companies soon became the most likely development. In mid-January 1999, GEC and British Aerospace confirmed they were holding talks. On 19 January, it was announced British Aerospace was to acquire Marconi Electronic Systems for £7.7bn ($12.75bn).

=== Marconi plc (1999–2002) ===
While the deal was yet to be completed, GEC used much of the anticipated proceeds of the MES sale to buy companies in 1999. This move was part of a major realignment of the firm to focus on the burgeoning telecoms sector, and it became a radio, telecommunications and internet equipment manufacturer. At the time, financial markets approved of the strategy; GEC's share value set new all-time highs during early 1999.

In 1999, Marconi plc purchased two American equipment-makers: RELTEC Corporation in March for £1.3bn, and FORE Systems in April for £2.8bn, to complement the telecommunication business of its subsidiary Marconi Communications. Later that year, GEC acquired Kvaerner's Govan shipyard. In April 2000, it acquired Mobile Systems International in exchange for £391m. Consolidating and monitoring the finances of these acquisitions soon added to the future difficulties encountered by Marconi.

These acquisitions were made at the height of the dot-com bubble, and the bursting of the bubble in 2001 took a heavy toll on Marconi. While the company initially chose to deny any impact to sales, the delayed issue of a profit warning spooked investors. In July 2001, Marconi plc suffered a 54% drop in its share price following the suspension of trading of its shares, profit warning, and redundancies. Having accumulated a sizeable debt pile that was continuing to mount due to heavy losses, Marconi was facing bankruptcy.

In September 2001, Simpson was forced to resign from Marconi and a new management team was brought in under Mike Parton, the new chief executive. Shares that had been worth £12.50 at GEC's peak had fallen to £0.04. Lord Weinstock's stake, once worth £480 million, was reduced to £2 million.

=== Marconi Corporation plc and break-up (2002–05) ===
On 19 May 2003, Marconi plc underwent a restructuring and became Marconi Corporation plc, advised by Lazard and Morgan Stanley. Marconi shareholders received one Marconi Corporation share for every 559 Marconi shares. In a debt-for-equity swap, the firm's creditors received 99.5% of the new company's shares. In October 2003, the company announced that it intended to pursue listing on the Nasdaq.

In 2005, the company failed to secure any part of BT's 21st Century Network (21CN) programme, surprising commentators and sending the company's shares tumbling. Before the announcement, the investment bank Dresdner Kleinwort had said, "[Marconi is] so advanced with its products and so entrenched with BT Group plc that its selection looks certain." Various bids were received for the business, including one from Huawei Technologies, with whom Marconi already had a joint venture.

Prior to the collapse of the Marconi group in 2005 and 2006, the company was a major supplier of Asynchronous Transfer Mode, Gigabit Ethernet, and Internet Protocol products. The majority of Marconi Corporation's businesses (including Marconi Communications and the rights to the Marconi name) were sold to Ericsson in 2005, and the remainder was renamed Telent plc.

On 27 October 2006, the company folded voluntarily.

== See also ==
- Aerospace industry in the United Kingdom
- GEC-Marconi scientist deaths conspiracy theory
- National Lift Tower – a lift test tower built by The Express Lift Company
