= Aeroflex =

Defunct American corporation

Aeroflex Inc.
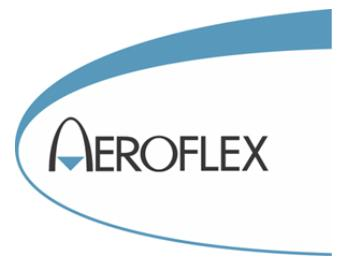
- Type: Public
- Traded as: NYSE: ARX
- Industry: Wireless test and measurement Hi-rel semiconductors
- Founded: 1937
- Defunct: May 2014
- Fate: Acquired by Cobham plc
- Headquarters: 35 South Service Road, Plainview, New York, United States
- Number of locations: 21
- Area served: Worldwide
- Key people: Jordie Jordan (CEO); Harvey R. Blau (Chairman and CEO, 2002–2007)
- Revenue: ▲$655 million (FY 2010)
- Net income: ▲$-12.2 million (FY 2010)
- Total assets: $1.36 billion (FY 2010)
- Total equity: $150 million (FY 2010)
- Number of employees: 10,692 (2016)
- Website: aeroflex.com

Aeroflex Inc. was an American company which produced test equipment, RF and microwave integrated circuits, components and systems used for wireless communications. Its headquarters were located in Plainview, New York. In May 2014, Aeroflex was acquired by the UK aerospace company Cobham for $1.46 billion.

== Overview ==
Aeroflex consisted of Aeroflex Microelectronic Solutions (AMS), a fabless manufacturer of radiation hardening (rad-hard) and high reliability semiconductor devices, and Aeroflex Test Solutions (ATS), which produced electronic test equipment.

== History ==
In 2002, Aeroflex acquired IFR Systems Inc, a test equipment manufacturer from Wichita, Kansas, originally founded in 1937. In 1998, IFR previously acquired Marconi Instruments, a British test equipment manufacturer.

In 2007, Aeroflex was taken private by a group of private equity firms including Veritas Capital, Golden Gate Capital, GS Direct.

In 2008, Aeroflex acquired Gaisler Research, a designer of rad-hard IP for space applications, including the open source LEON processor.

In 2009, Aeroflex acquired VI Technology, a test automation company.

In 2010, Aeroflex acquired Willtek, a test equipment manufacturer from San Diego, California. Willtek was split from another company which previously acquired Wavetek.

In 2010, Aeroflex acquired Radiation Assured Devices of Colorado Springs, Colorado and changes its name to Aeroflex RAD.

In 2010, Aeroflex acquired Advanced Control Components for $20 Million.

In 2010, Aeroflex announced an initial public offering of 17.25 million shares.

In FY 2010, AMS and ATS contributed almost equally to net sales. The majority of sales, particularly for AMS, are in the space, avionics, and defense markets.

In May 2014, Aeroflex was acquired by the UK aerospace company Cobham for $1.46 billion.

In March 2018, Viavi Solutions purchased Cobham AvComm and Wireless Test and Measurement, which were previously part of Aeroflex, for $455 million. These business units will continue using the name Aeroflex until March 2021.

== Aeroflex Colorado Springs ==

Aeroflex Colorado Springs was a division which manufactured integrated circuits for the aerospace, defense, medical, industrial, and security markets. It was located in Colorado Springs, Colorado. Aeroflex mixed-signal ASICs and standard products containing data acquisition, communication, and processing circuits are supplied for uses such as medical imaging, safety-critical industrial, point-of-sale, and secure data processing systems. Circuit card assembly was also available.

== Legal actions ==
In 2013, the US State Department settled with Aeroflex Incorporated over alleged violations of the Arms Export Control Act ("AECA")(22 U.S.C. § 2778) and the International Traffic in Arms Regulations ("ITAR")(22 C.F.R. parts 120-130). The settlement was reached relative to ITAR Section 128.11 wherein Aeroflex entered into a consent agreement with the State Department. Based on this settlement, Aeroflex paid a civil penalty of $4 million, and the State Department waived an additional $4 million penalty on the “condition the Department approves expenditures for self-initiated, pre-Consent Agreement remedial compliance measures and Consent Agreement-authorized remedial compliance costs.” Aeroflex voluntarily disclosed most of the ITAR violations resolved in this settlement, “acknowledged their serious nature, cooperated with Department reviews, and since 2008 has implemented or has planned extensive remedial measures, including the restructuring of its compliance organization, the institution of a new testing protocol of its commodities, and a revised company-wide ITAR compliance program,” according to the State Department. According to a Reuters special report, while the State Department’s investigation was underway, Aeroflex exported more than 7,000 high-tech rad-chips to China, between 2003 and 2008, after US officials had directed the company to stop the exports.

== Products ==
AMS Group

- Hi-rel MSI integrated circuits
- RF and microwave discretes
- Mixed signal and digital application-specific integrated circuits (ASICs)
- Motion control

ATS Group

- Wireless communications test (the TM500 LTE test system was Aeroflex's top-selling product in FY 2010)
- Avionics test
- Signal generators
- Spectrum/signal analyzers

ATE Group

- In-circuit test systems
- AOI
- Functional Test platform

== See also ==
- Harvey R. Blau
