= Taplow Lake =

Lake in Buckinghamshire, England

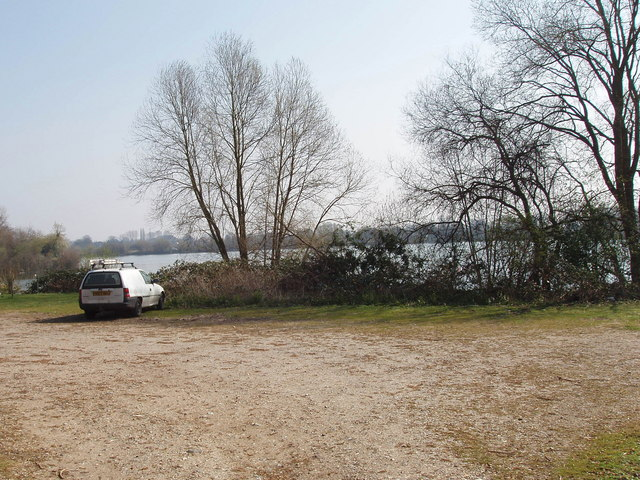
- Interactive map of Taplow Lake
- Location: Amerden Lane, Buckinghamshire, England
- Coordinates: 51.5203°N 0.6892°W
- Surface area: 30 acres (12 ha)

Taplow Lake is a 30-acre (120,000 m^{2}) lake just south of the A4 between Maidenhead and Slough in Amerden Lane, Buckinghamshire. Recreational activities on the lake include swimming, wakeboarding and waterskiing. A café is also located here serving breakfast and lunch.
