= BT 21CN =

The 21st Century Network (21CN) programme is the data and voice network transformation project, under way since 2004, of the UK telecommunications company BT Group plc. It was intended to move BT's telephone network from the AXE/System X Public Switched Telephone Network (PSTN) to an Internet Protocol (IP) system. As well as switching over the PSTN, BT planned to deliver many additional services over their new data network, such as on-demand interactive TV services.

BT originally stated that it would accrue annual savings of £1 billion when the transition to the new network was completed, and hoped to have over 50% of its customers transferred by 2008 (see External links below for current progress on the roll-out of optical fibre by Openreach). Capital expenditure was put at £10 billion over five years, this being 75% of BT's total capital spending plans in that period.

== Architecture ==
The new network is based on an architectural model of five classes of network nodes. These are:

- Premises
- Access (MSAN)
- Metro
- Core
- iNode

=== Premises ===
Premises nodes includes residential, small-medium enterprise (SME) and enterprise. The presumption is that all these will have high speed connections to the network, delivered over copper (in the form of ADSL or other DSL technologies) or over fibre, as either PON or direct fibre in the case of large enterprises. The sole exception to this presumption is for legacy PSTN, where provision will continue to be made for analogue voice.

=== Access node ===
21CN introduced the concept of the multi-service access node (MSAN). This logical node takes the various access technologies (mentioned above) and, where possible, aggregates these onto a single backhaul network technology. This includes converting analogue voice into voice over IP (VoIP) using the MSAN as a media gateway (MGW). The aim is to implement a few hundred access nodes. Note that these will not have any IP routing capability, but will essentially be layer 2 Ethernet devices.

=== Metro node ===
The backhaul network will terminate on the metro nodes. At this point the IP-based services will be implemented, and the metro nodes are the first location where IP traffic is routed. Call control (via a softswitch or an IMS CSCF) will be implemented here, although the softswitches and the IMS components won't be described as a part of the metro node – they are parts of the iNode. The metro nodes are also provider edge (PE) routers in MPLS terminology, encapsulating the IP traffic in MPLS tunnels for transmission over the core. The aim is to implement around 100 metro nodes.

=== Core node ===
The core nodes are MPLS switches, with the MPLS traffic carried over optical (DWDM) transport. They are completely unaware of customer IP traffic, and only switch based on MPLS tags (all customer IP traffic is encapsulated with an MPLS header by the metro node PEs). Native IP is only used by the core nodes for protocols such as MP-BGP, an IGP, LDP, and RSVP to exchange routing and label information between all core and metro nodes. The aim is to have approximately 10 core nodes.

=== iNode ===
iNodes are the logical nodes that provide the control for the services implemented using the other four types of node. BT has announced that it intends to create an IMS based iNode capability, although its initial PSTN replacement will not be an IMS implementation. The iNode will implement a set of standardized functions – common capabilities – that deliver layered services. Common capabilities include session management, authentication, profile, address book, presence and location. Combinations of these capability primitives will be used to deliver different service types and functionality.

The iNode is built upon the AXE telephone exchange TSS (Telephony Softswitch Server) and is currently using HP Alpha processors (APZ 212 50) as well as the IS-Blade in the APZ logic. After extensive field testing in the South Wales Pathfinder area, all current logical and intelligent network services now operate in conjunction with the existing PSTN and the MPLS network.

== Differences ==
The most significant differences between the legacy 20th century network (20CN) and 21CN are:

- The use of VoIP landline telephone services served digitally, rather than the previous analogue PSTN system. This does not mean telephone services are provided over the Internet with 21CN. In reality this will make no difference to the end user.
- The availability of ADSL2+ (including ADSL2+ Annex M) broadband services. The 20CN allows services up to ADSL Max with a maximum download throughput of 8 Mbit/s whereas ADSL2+ allows a maximum theoretical download throughput of 24 Mbit/s.
- The retirement of legacy IPstream data services previously available with 20CN.

== Evolution towards FTTC ==
Any chain is only as strong as its weakest link, and in the case of 21CN, its weakest link – the access network – is also its most valuable. Although the architecture of 21CN simplifies the network plant, it does not look to solve the problem which will have the greatest effect on data rate, that is loop length i.e. the length of cable from the exchange to the customer. Unlike the active core network, the access network is a passive network and has no capability for self-discovery. Reasonable consumer expectations can be established based upon the length and characteristics of these wires. A more global model would require precise knowledge of wire material (e.g. copper or aluminium), where the wires are routed, and the direction in which traffic flows around the circuit. This information is not held at present, and would need significant effort to obtain.

By moving the MSANs deeper into the network, i.e. to street side cabinets, length issues are more likely to be reduced; however, line transmission characteristics are still highly variable since lines may be bridged with materials other than copper (such as aluminium) which have a degrading effect on conductivity and hence signal strength. In addition changes in wire gauge (thickness) are common and introduce signal reflection due to changes in impedance.

The original 21CN design did not look to drive MSANs deeper into the network; instead it locates them in each exchange. Without detailed information on the critical local routings, it is difficult to ascertain what capacity remains in the duct network and which connections run through it. This makes planning of future upgrades or fibre additions difficult. Openreach considered integrating MSANs into the access network, although this was originally deemed unlikely to happen because there are only 5,600 exchange buildings and over 85,000 'primary connection points', usually in the form of street cabinets.

However, in July 2007, Sir Christopher Bland, chairman of BT, stated that BT was considering fibre to the kerb and that VDSL2 was a 'likely development going forward'. In October 2007, Ofcom launched a consultation into Next Generation Access Networks in the UK after pressure from the government.

Subsequently, Openreach began a rollout of VDSL2 FTTC technology over 21CN, deploying DSLAMs in thousands of new street-side cabinets. BT Retail launched their BT Infinity service in 2010 and expected to continue expanding availability by installing new cabinets until at least 2014. The FTTC deployment essentially installs a small (96-288 line) DSLAM into thousands of street cabinets, each backhauled using direct fibre to a larger exchange or metro node, removing much of the local-loop length limitations and allowing end-user speeds exceeding 100 Mbit/s following future upgrades.

== Suppliers ==
In April 2005, BT announced that it had selected eight suppliers for its 21CN roll-out. These were:

- Fujitsu – MSAN
- Huawei – MSAN and core optical
- Alcatel – metro
- Lucent – core MPLS, using Juniper components
- Cisco – metro and core MPLS
- Siemens – metro, using Juniper components
- Ciena – core optical
- Ericsson – iNode

Alcatel and Lucent merged in December 2006 to form Alcatel-Lucent.

The fact that Britain's Marconi received no major 21CN contract was a surprise to commentators and sent the company's shares tumbling. An example of analysis before BT's announcement is Dresdner Kleinwort Wasserstein's: "[Marconi is] so advanced with its products and so entrenched with BT Group plc that its selection looks certain."

== See also ==
- Next generation network
