= Telent =

British technology company

Telent Technology Services Limited
- Type: Private
- Industry: Digital infrastructure
- Founded: January 24, 2006; 20 years ago
- Headquarters: Warwick, England, United Kingdom
- Key people: Steve Dalton (Managing Director, Telent)
- Products: Communication and I.T. systems services
- Revenue: £568 million (2020)
- Owner: M Group Services
- Number of employees: Approximately 2,257 (2019)
- Website: telent.com

Telent Technology Services Limited is a British radio, telecommunications, and digital infrastructure systems installation and services provision company, formed in 2006 on completion of the break-up of the GEC conglomerate. Since 2025 it has been a subsidiary of M Group Services.

The Telent name has been used since 2006 for those parts of the United Kingdom and German services businesses of Marconi Corporation (formerly General Electric Company, GEC) which had not been acquired by Ericsson in that year. Companies with Marconi in their name can trace their ultimate origins, through mergers and takeovers, to The Marconi Company Ltd., founded by Guglielmo Marconi in 1897 as The Wireless Telegraph & Signal Company.

The firm was acquired by the Pension Insurance Corporation in 2007. Between 2008 and 2013, Telent secured contracts from large British companies, including Network Rail and Openreach, and completed several acquisitions in the telecoms services sector. In September 2017, Edmund Truell purchased Telent; two years later, J.C. Flowers obtained a sizeable stake in the business. In August 2025, Telent was acquired by M Group Services (a business of CVC Capital Partners).

== History ==
The company's predecessor was formed in September 1961 as GEC Telecommunications Limited, a division of the GEC conglomerate. In 1988, the division became part of the GEC Plessey Telecommunications joint venture, and following the breakup of GPT during the 1990s it was renamed Marconi Communications Limited in 1998, when GEC decided to switch to use the better known Marconi brand name which it had owned for some time.

In January 2006, following the Swedish telecommunications firm Ericsson's acquisition of most Marconi assets, including the rights to the Marconi name, the remaining UK and German services business of Marconi Corporation which was not acquired and no longer had the rights to use the Marconi name was renamed Telent. That same year, an attempted £346 million acquisition of the company by US private equity fund Fortress was blocked by the shareholding hedge fund Polygon. In May 2007, Telent announced its move from Coventry to Warwick's Opus 40 business park.

In November 2007, Telent, which had inherited GEC's £2.5 billion pension scheme with several tens of thousands of members, was purchased by the Pension Insurance Corporation in exchange for £400 million; during the following month, its shares were delisted and Telent became a private company.

During 2008, Telent completed various acquisitions, including the intelligent traffic systems specialist TSEU Group in March, communications infrastructure provider the Alan Campbell Group in July, and telecoms service provider Premises Networks in September.

In 2009, via a joint venture with the services outsourcing firm Carillion, Telent signed a contract with Openreach to provide support services over a seven-year period valued at roughly £1 billion. In February 2017, a three-year extension to the joint venture's framework agreement with Openreach was agreed, which was reportedly worth up to £1.5 billion; months later, following the collapse of Carillion, Telent took sole responsibility for service delivery. In September 2020, it was announced that Telent had been awarded a contract by Openreach to support a £12 billion project for the UK's largest ultrafast broadband build, which would bring 'full fibre' broadband to thousands of homes and businesses.

In summer 2013, it was announced that Telent had been awarded a contract by the national rail infrastructure owner Network Rail to deliver a new nationwide Supervisory Control and Data Acquisition (SCADA) system, to enable safer working conditions for trackside workers. Under this contract, 16 separate legacy electrical control systems, some of them dating back to the 1950s and using electromechanical control panels, would be replaced by the new SCADA implementation. In June 2025, it was reported that several sites had gone live and that the UK's first remote securing of electrical infrastructure had been completed.

In 2017, Telent secured a £450 million contract for the next generation National Roads Telecommunications Service (NRTS) on behalf of Highways England; this connects the organisation's seven regional control centres and the national traffic operations centre with roughly 30,000 roadside technology assets (including message signs, CCTV cameras and emergency roadside telephones) that help manage traffic, reduce congestion, and provide emergency assistance to motorists. Following contract extensions, this arrangement will run until at least 2028.

In September 2017, the pension scheme buyout vehicle Edmund Truell acquired Telent and its £3 billion retirement fund in exchange for £398 million; at the time, it was the largest takeover in the UK's market for the purchase of retirement liabilities. Two years later, the company's pension scheme, which was described by Telent as being a "disproportionately large liability", was bought out by the insurer Rothesay Life. Around this time, a controlling stake in Telent was held by the American private equity investment firm J.C. Flowers.

In 2021, Telent announced the launch of its first 5G private network service. That same year, it also acquired the Harlequin Group; the purchase enhanced its professional services offering to mobile network providers as well as its fibre network design and planning capabilities.

In December 2023, the firm was contracted to complete upgrade works on the West Coast Main Line as part of a wider telecommunications transition in the region. During April 2025, Telent was appointed to deliver a railway telecoms renewal programme throughout the Wales and Western Region, delivering upgrades to key telecoms systems and renewing station information and security systems at various Network Rail-managed stations. That same year, via a joint venture with the Japanese-based vendor Hitachi Rail, Telent secured a separate contract to deliver the communications infrastructure for High Speed 2 (HS2).

In August 2024, Telent reported that, under an arrangement with HM Coastguard, it had connected 163 remote radio sites along 11,000 miles of UK coastline with full fibre for use in emergency response efforts.

In early 2025, it was reported that the British engineering company Amey plc was among several firms bidding to acquire Telent. In August 2025, it was announced that Telent had been acquired for an undisclosed sum by M Group services, an infrastructure services provider operating across the British Isles. At that time, Telent was recording around £500 million in annual revenues, and the acquisition increased M Group's pro-forma revenue to over £3 billion.

In January 2026, Telent signed a deal with the Royal Air Force to operate and improve the Site Co-ordination, Installation and Design Authority (SCIDA) service at 244 locations.

== Operations ==
The company provides a range of network and communications services to industries including Rail, Traffic, Public Safety, Defence, Service Providers, Enterprise and Public Sector. Products include enterprise software systems, emergency services communications and logistics, integrated warehouse logistics systems and rail and metro systems. Customers include BAE Systems, BT, National Highways, HM Coastguard, Interoute, London Ambulance Service, Merseyside Fire & Rescue, Metropolitan Police, Network Rail, RNLI, Sky, Transport for London, Virgin Media and Vodafone.

The company has many operational sites within the UK and Ireland, including at Chorley in Lancashire, Warwick, Camberley in Surrey, Harbour Exchange in London, and Dublin. A team of telecommunications technicians and engineers provide support and new features development for the TDM System X network used by BT, Virgin Media, Kingston Communications, Vodafone, and Gibtelecom.

== People ==
From its formation in 2006, Telent's CEO was Mark Plato. He died in a motorcycle accident in September 2019. Non-executive director Frank McKay, former CEO of Travis Perkins and Brakes Group, was appointed as his temporary replacement and was succeeded in July 2020 by Jo Gretton, a Telent executive since 2006. From October 2025, Steve Dalton stepped into the role of Managing Director for Telent.

== See also ==
- Marconi Electronic Systems
