= Ferranti =

British electrical engineering company (1882–1993)

Ferranti International PLC
- Type: Public
- Industry: Electronics & Defence
- Founded: 1882; 144 years ago (as Ferranti, Thompson and Ince); 1885 (as S. Z. de Ferranti); 1901 (as Ferranti Ltd)
- Defunct: 1993; 33 years ago (the Belgian subsidiary lives on as Ferranti Computer Systems and as of 1994 is part of the Nijkerk Holding)
- Fate: Bankrupt & broken up
- Successor: GEC-Marconi, Matra Marconi Space
- Headquarters: Hollinwood, Greater Manchester, United Kingdom
- Key people: Sebastian Ziani de Ferranti

Ferranti International PLC or simply Ferranti was a UK-based electrical engineering and equipment firm that operated for over a century, from 1885 until its bankruptcy in 1993. At its peak, Ferranti was a significant player in power grid systems, defence electronics, and computing, and was once a constituent of the FTSE 100 Index.

It was founded by the pioneering electrical engineer Sebastian Ziani de Ferranti during 1885, and soon became a key supplier of electricity meters to numerous electric utility firms and power distribution companies. The firm branched into other electrical apparatus, such as transformers, while also establishing overseas subsidiaries, such as the Canada-based Ferranti Electric in 1912, to access further opportunities. Starting in the 1910s, Ferranti entered the defence sector, producing shells and fuzes during the First World War. In the Second World War, it played a key role in the development of both radar and the Identification Friend or Foe (IFF) system. During the Cold War, the company produced an extensive range of defense products, including advanced cockpit displays, radar transmitters, inertial navigation systems, and avionics for military aircraft, including the Tornado fighter jet. It was a pioneer in computer technology, launching the Ferranti Mark 1 in 1951, one of the world's first commercially available computers. Ferranti's global footprint extended beyond the UK, with factories and branch plants in Australia, Canada, Singapore, Germany, and the United States. The company had a strong presence in Edinburgh, including numerous branch-plants as well as an aviation facility.

During the mid 1970s, Ferranti received a bailout from the British government, and was partly-owned by the state until the early 1980s. In 1987, the company purchased the American defence contractor International Signal and Control (ISC); two years later, Ferranti announced that it had discovered irregularities in ISC, which turned out to have been allegedly heavily involved in illegal arms sales directed by US clandestine organizations. While ISG's CEO was jailed, the debt burden from the ill-advised ISG investment compelled Ferranti to divest divisions and declare bankruptcy in late 1993. Despite its eventual collapse, some parts of Ferranti's legacy continue today. The Belgian subsidiary survives as Ferranti Computer Systems, now part of Nijkerk Holding since 1994. Other divisions were acquired by major corporations, including BAE Systems, Leonardo (formerly Finmeccanica), Ultra Electronics, Thales, and Elbit Systems, with some still operating under different names. Even outside of business, Ferranti left a cultural mark. The Ferranti Edinburgh Recreation Club, the Ferranti Mountaineering Club, and the Ferranti Ten-Pin Bowling League continue to exist. Additionally, Ferranti Thistle F.C., originally founded in 1943, evolved into Livingston F.C., a team competing in the Scottish Professional Football League.

== History ==
=== Beginnings ===
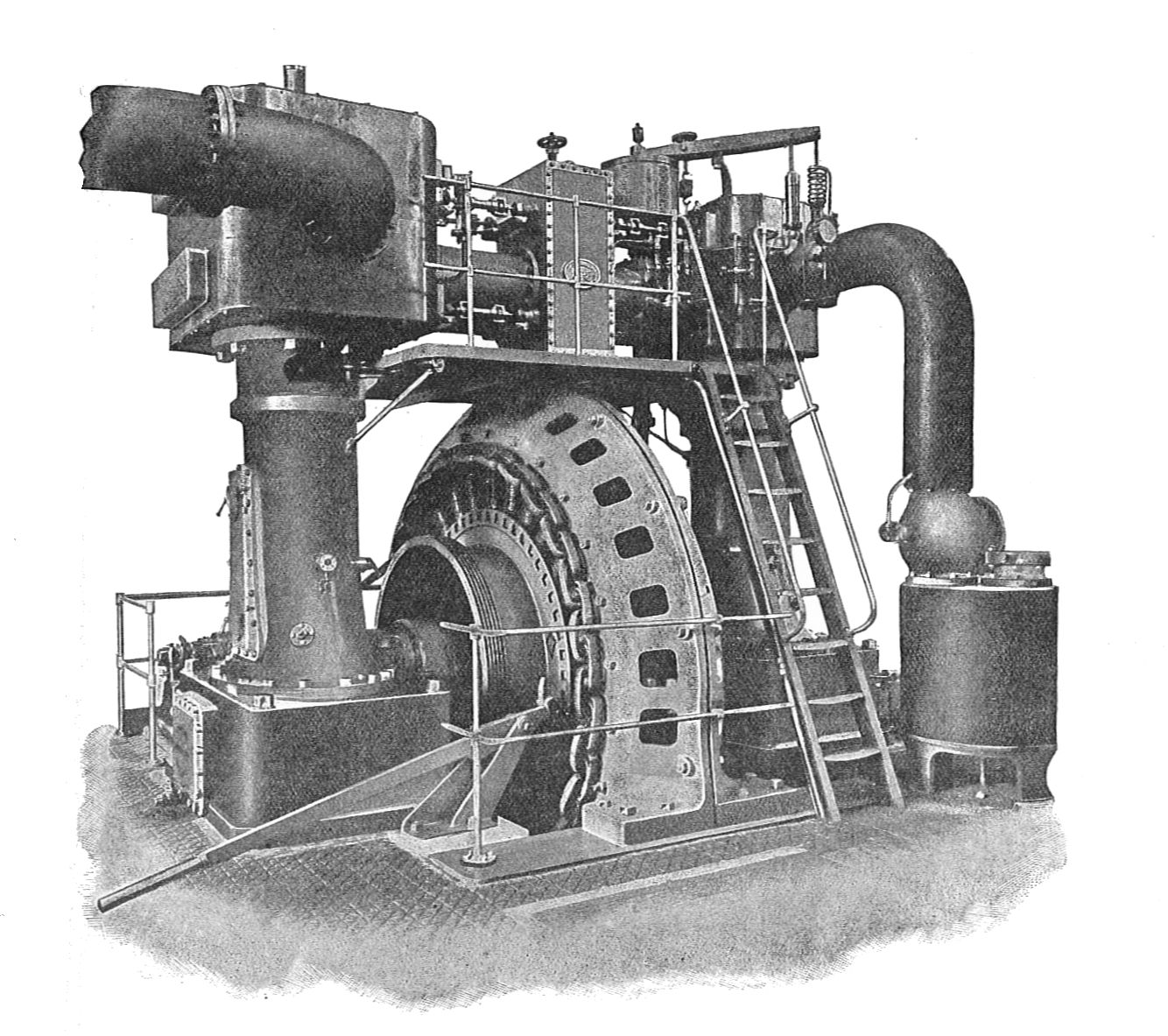
Ferranti steam generating set, c. 1900

The British electrical engineer and inventor Sebastian Ziani de Ferranti established his first business Ferranti, Thompson and Ince in 1882. The company developed the Ferranti-Thompson Alternator. Ferranti focused on alternating current power distribution early on, and was one of the few UK experts. In 1885 Dr. Ferranti established a new business, with Francis Ince and Charles Sparks as partners, known as S.Z. de Ferranti. According to J.F. Wilson, Dr. Ferranti's association with the electricity meter persuaded Ince to partner him in this new venture, and meter development was fundamental to the survival and growth of his business for several decades to come.

Despite being a prime exponent of alternating current, Ferranti became an important supplier to many electric utility firms and power distribution companies for both AC and DC meters. In 1887, the London Electric Supply Corporation (LESCo) hired Dr. Ferranti for the design of their power station at Deptford. He designed the building, the generating plant and the distribution system and on its completion in October 1890, it was the first truly modern power station. It supplied high-voltage AC power at 10,000 volts, which was transformed to a lower voltage for consumer use where required.

Success followed and Ferranti started producing electrical equipment (especially transformers) for sale. Soon the company was looking for considerably more manufacturing space. Land prices in the London area were too high, so the company moved to Hollinwood in Oldham in 1896. In July 1901, Ferranti Limited was formed, specifically to take over the assets of S.Z. de Ferranti Ltd and raise equity, but failed to impress potential new investors as it was still dominated by family ownership. Over-optimistic market projections in the boom of 1896–1903, declining revenues and liquidity problems, forced the company bankers Parrs to send the company into receivership in 1903.

The business was restructured in 1905, Dr. Ferranti's shareholding being reduced to less than 10 percent. For the next eleven years the company was run by receiver managers and Dr. Ferranti was effectively excluded from commercial financial strategies. He spent much of this period working in partnership with the likes of J.P. Coats of Paisley on cotton spinning machinery and Vickers on re-superheating turbines.

=== Expansion ===
Through the early part of the 20th century, electrical power was supplied by small companies, typically as an offshoot of plant set up to provide power to local industry. Each plant supplied a different standard, which made the mass production of domestic electrical equipment inefficient. In 1910, Dr. Ferranti made a presidential speech to the IEE addressing this issue, but it would be another sixteen years before the commencement of the National Grid in 1926.

In 1912, in a move driven by A.B. Anderson, the Ferranti Managing Director, Ferranti formed a company in Canada, Ferranti Electric, to exploit the overseas meter market. However, in 1914, two significant events happened, Anderson drowned on his return from Canada in the Empress of Ireland sinking and the outbreak of the First World War signalled an opportunity for Dr. Ferranti to once again get involved in day-to-day events in the company. He wanted to get involved in the manufacture of shells and fuzes, but it wasn't until 1915 that he finally convinced the board to accept this. As a result of this work, Ferranti were in a healthier financial position at the end of the conflict.

High voltage power transformers became an important product for Ferranti; some of the largest types weighed over one hundred tons. Dr. Ferranti's son Vincent joined the transformer department as manager in 1921 and was instrumental in expanding the work started by his father. After the death of Dr. Ferranti in 1930, he became the chairman and chief executive. In 1935, Ferranti purchased a disused wire drawing mill at Moston: from here it manufactured many "brown goods" such as televisions, radios, and electric clocks. The company later sold its radio and television interests to EKCO in 1957. Production of clocks ended in 1957 and other product lines phased out in 1960 Ferranti Instruments, based at Moston, developed various items for scientific measurements, including one of the first cone and plate viscometers. Ferranti built a new power transformer works at Hollinwood in the mid-1950s at a time when there was growth in the power supply distribution industry.

By 1974, Ferranti had become an important supplier to the defence industry, but its power transformer division was making losses, creating acute financial problems. This led to the company being bailed out by the UK government's National Enterprise Board, which took a 65 percent share of the company in return. After restructuring, it was returned to the private sector in 1980 as a profitable company.

=== Defence electronics ===
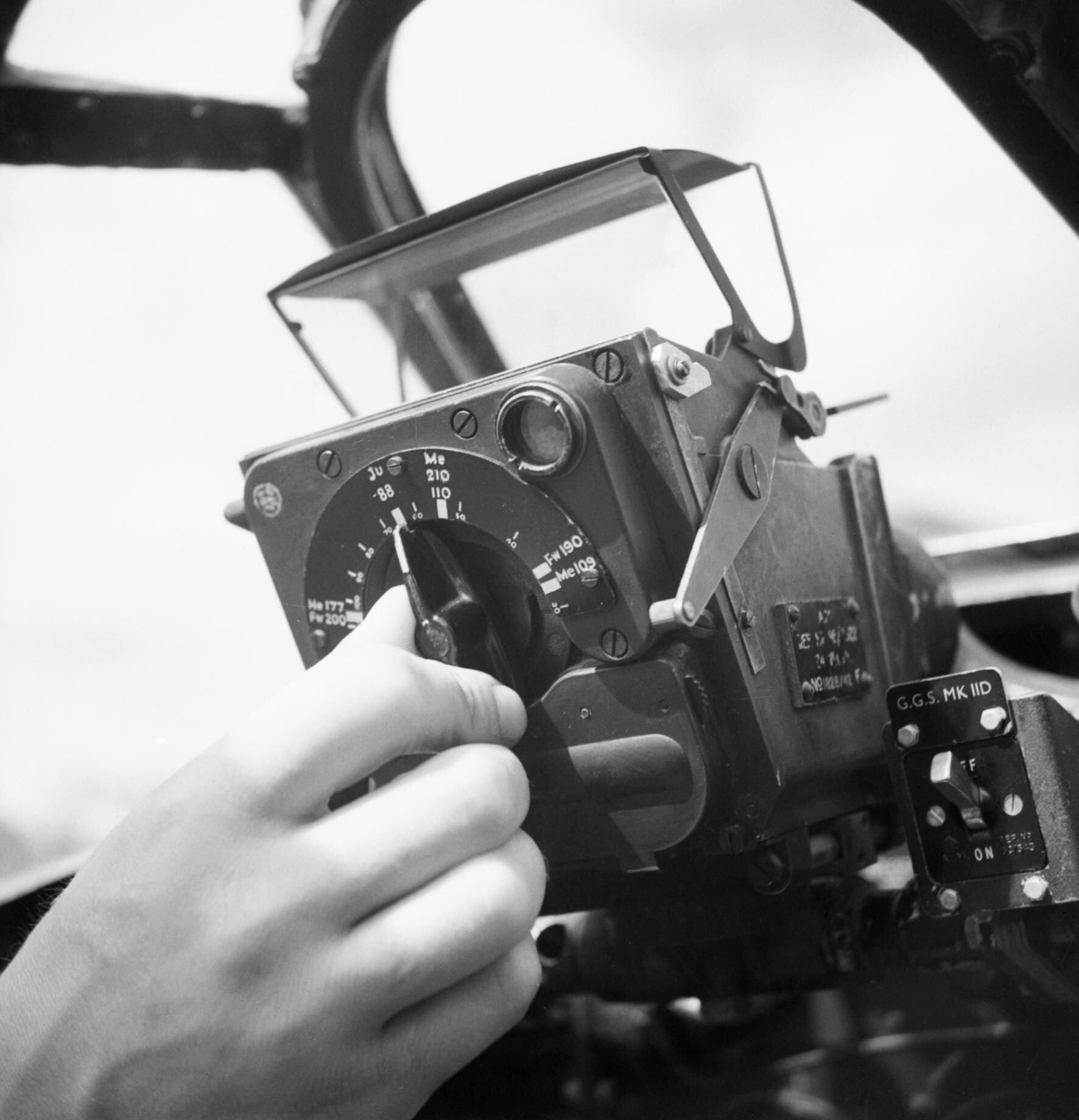
Spitfire gyro gunsight

During the Second World War, Ferranti became a major supplier of electronics, fuzes, valves, and was, through development of the Identification Friend or Foe (IFF) system, heavily involved in the early development of radar in the United Kingdom. In the post-war era, this became a large segment of the company, with various branches supplying radar sets, avionics and other military electronics, both in the UK and the various international offices.

In 1943, Ferranti opened a factory at Crewe Toll in Edinburgh to manufacture gyro gunsights for the Spitfire aircraft. After the conflict, the senior managers were reluctant to return to Manchester having settled into the Edinburgh area. They were given the ultimatum of coming up with new products to replace the war time equipment that was no longer required. They embarked on designing airborne Radar and Inertial Navigation equipment. The firm set up Ferranti (Scotland) to complement this business which grew to employ 8,000 staff in 8 locations, becoming the birthplace of the Scottish electronics industry, and a major contributor to company profitability. Later products included solid state ring laser gyroscope.

From 1949, Ferranti-Packard assisted the Royal Canadian Navy develop DATAR (Digital Automated Tracking and Resolving). DATAR was a pioneering computerized battlefield information system that combined radar and sonar information to provide commanders with an "overall view" of a battlefield, allowing them to coordinate attacks on submarines and aircraft.

In the 1950s, work focused on the development of airborne radar, with the company subsequently supplying radars to most of the UK's fast jet and helicopter fleets. Today the Crewe Toll site (now part of Leonardo S.p.A.) leads the consortium providing the Euroradar CAPTOR radar for the Eurofighter Typhoon.

In the 1960s and 1970s, inertial navigation systems became an important product line for the company with systems designed for fast jet (Harrier, Phantom, Tornado), space and land applications. The electro-mechanical inertial navigation systems were constructed at the Silverknowes site in Edinburgh. In addition to their other military and civil applications, they were used in the ESA Ariane 4 and first Ariane 5 launches. Ferranti also produced the PADS (Position and Azimuth Determining System), an inertial navigation system which could be mounted in a vehicle and was used by the British Army.

With the invention of the laser in the 1960s, the company quickly established itself in the electro-optics arena. From the early 1970s, it was delivering the Laser Rangefinder and Marked Target Seeker (LRMTS) for the Jaguar and Harrier fleets, and later for Tornado. It supplied the world's first man-portable laser rangefinder/designator (Laser Target Marker, or LTM) to the British Army in 1974, and had notable successes in the US market, establishing Ferranti Electro-optics Inc in Huntington Beach, California. Its TIALD Pod (Thermal Imaging Airborne Laser Designator) has been in almost constant combat operation on the Tornado since it was rushed into service during the first Gulf War.

From the 1960s through to the late 1980s, the Bristol Ferranti Bloodhound SAM, for which Ferranti developed radar systems, was a key money earner.

In 1970, Ferranti became involved in the sonar field through its involvement with Plessey in a new series of sonars, for which it designed and built the computer subsystems. This work later expanded when it won a contract for the complete Sonar 2050. The work was originally carried out at the Wythenshawe factory and then at Cheadle Heath. Takeovers of other companies gave it expertise in sonar arrays. This business later became Ferranti Thomson Sonar Systems.

The selection of the radar for the project that became the Eurofighter Typhoon became a major international issue in the early 1990s. Britain, Italy, and Spain supported the Ferranti-led ECR-90, while Germany preferred the MSD2000 (a collaboration between Hughes, AEG and GEC). An agreement was reached after UK Defence Secretary Tom King assured his German counterpart Gerhard Stoltenberg that the British government would underwrite the project and allow GEC to acquire Ferranti Defence Systems from its troubled parent. Hughes sued GEC for $600 million for its role in the selection of the EFA and alleged that it used Hughes technology in the ECR-90 when it took over Ferranti. It later dropped this allegation and was awarded $23 million; the court judged that the MSD-2000 "had a real or substantial chance of succeeding had GEC not tortuously intervened ... and had the companies, which were bound by the Collaboration Agreement, faithfully and diligently performed their continuing obligations thereunder to press and promote the case for MSD-2000."

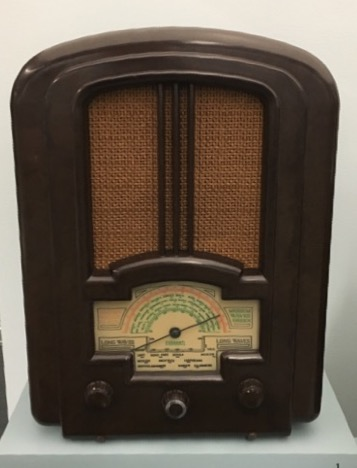
Ferranti 837 All-Wave Superhet radio (1937), made of Bakelite

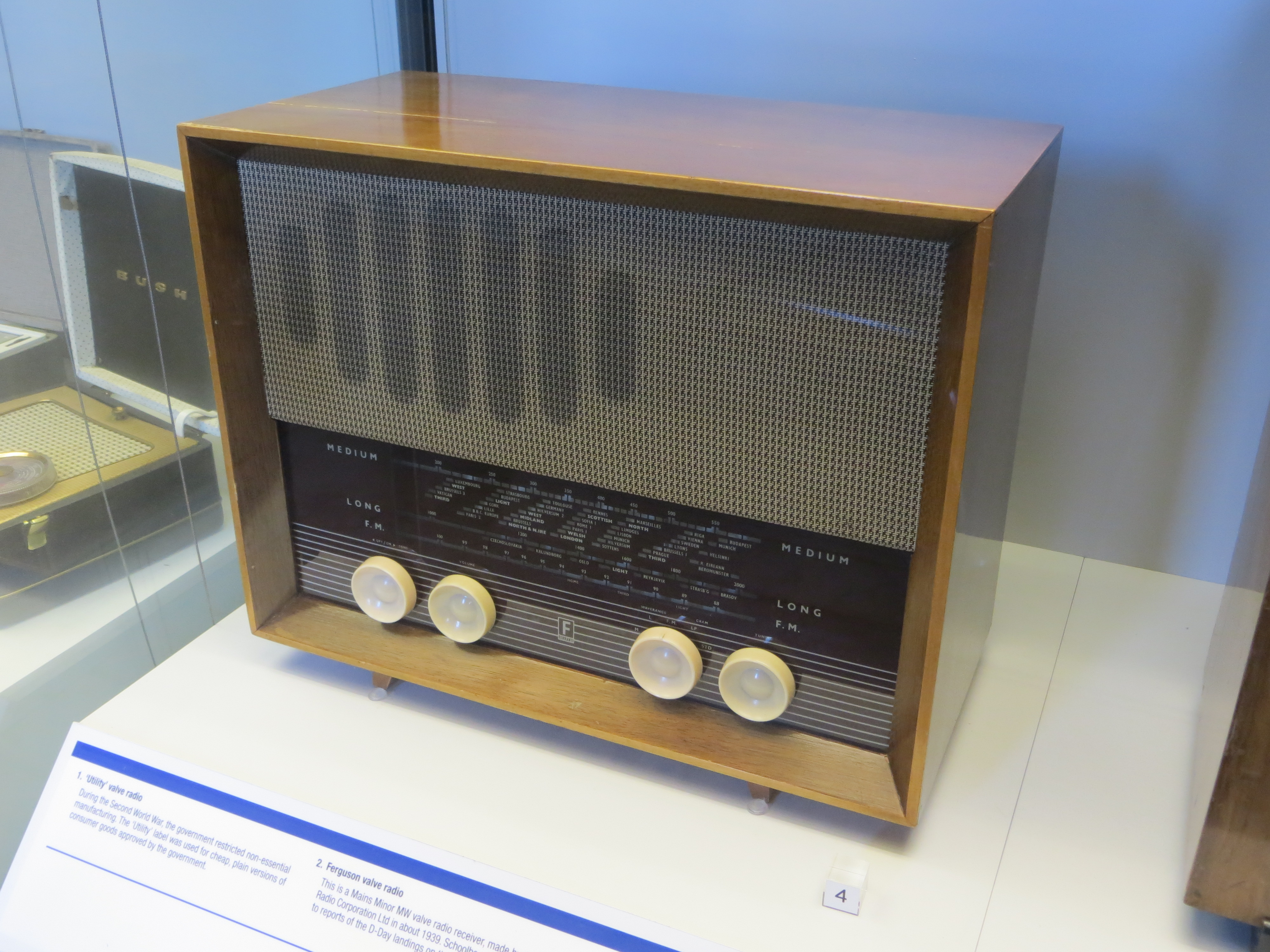
Ferranti radio

=== Industrial electronics ===
The company began marketing optical position measuring equipment for machine tools in 1956. Moire fringes produced by diffraction gratings were the basis for the position measurement. In the late 1980s, there were several sections of the company involved in non-military areas. These included portable Market Research Terminals (Ferranti Computer Systems), microwave communications equipment (Ferranti Communications), and petrol (gas) station pumps (Ferranti Autocourt). Both of the latter departments were based at Dalkeith, Scotland.

=== Computers ===
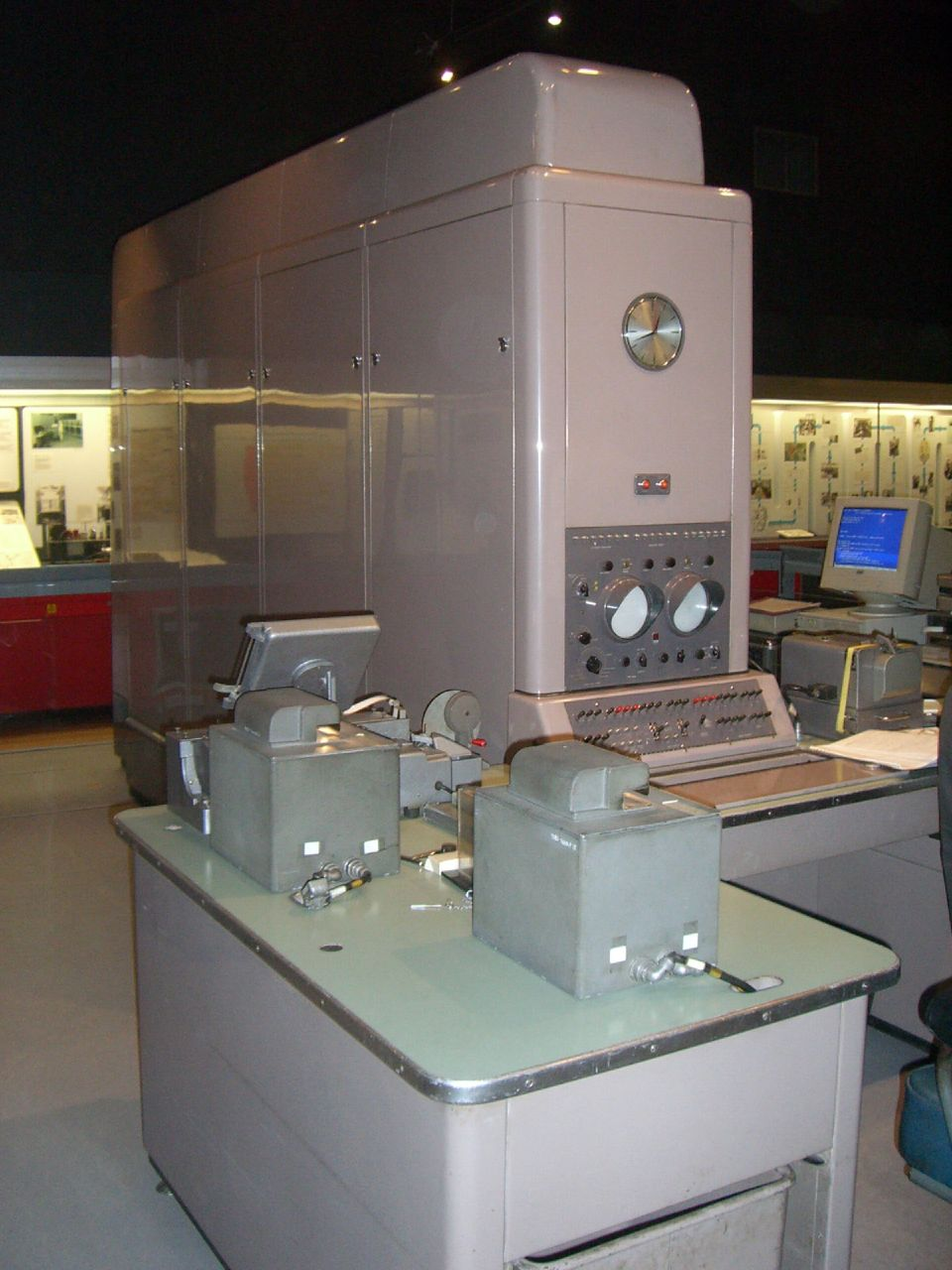
Ferranti Pegasus computer in The Science Museum, London

In the late 1940s, Ferranti joined with various university-based research groups to develop computers. Their first effort was the Ferranti Mark 1, completed in 1951, with about nine delivered between 1951 and 1957. The Pegasus introduced in 1956 was their most popular valve (vacuum tube) system, with 38 units sold. Circa 1956, Ivan Idelson, at Ferranti, originated the Cluff–Foster–Idelson coding of characters on 7-track paper tape for a BSI committee. This also inspired the development of ASCII.

In collaboration with the Victoria University of Manchester they built a new version of the famous Mark 1 that replaced valve diodes with solid state versions, which allowed the speed to be increased dramatically as well as increasing reliability. Ferranti offered the result commercially as the Mercury starting in 1957, and eventually sold nineteen in total. Although a small part of Ferranti's empire, the computer division was nevertheless highly visible and operated out of a former steam locomotive factory in West Gorton.

Work on a completely new design, the Atlas, started soon after the delivery of the Mercury, aiming to dramatically improve performance. Ferranti continued their collaboration with the University of Manchester, and Plessey became a third partner. The second generation supercomputer first ran in December 1962. Eventually six machines were built, one of which was a stripped-down version that was modified for the needs of the University of Cambridge Mathematical Laboratory; the Titan (or Atlas 2) was the mainstay of scientific computing in Cambridge for nearly 8 years. Atlas was the first computer in the world to implement virtual memory.

By the early 1960s, their mid-size machines were no longer competitive, but efforts to design a replacement were bogged down. Into this void stepped the Canadian division, Ferranti-Packard, who had used several of the ideas under development in England to very quickly produce the Ferranti-Packard 6000. By this time Ferranti's management was tired of the market and were looking for someone to buy the entire division. Eventually it was merged into International Computers and Tabulators (ICT) in 1963, becoming the Large Systems Division of ICL in 1968. After studying several options, ICT selected the FP 6000 as the basis for their ICT 1900 series line which sold into the 1970s.

The deal setting up ICT excluded Ferranti from the commercial sector of computing, but left the industrial field free. Some of the technology of the FP 6000 was later used in its Ferranti Argus range of industrial computers which were developed in its Wythenshawe factory. The first of these, simply Argus, was initially developed for military use.

Meanwhile, in Bracknell the Digital Systems Division was developing a range of mainframe computers for naval applications. Early computers using discrete transistors were the Hermes and Poseidon and these were followed by the F1600 in the mid-1960s. Some of these machines remained in active service on naval vessels for many years. The FM1600B was the first of the range to use integrated circuits and was used in many naval and commercial applications. The FM1600D was a single-rack version of the computer for smaller systems. An airborne version of this was also made and used aboard the RAF Nimrod. The FM1600E was a redesigned and updated version of the FM1600B, and the last in the series was the F2420, an upgraded FM1600E with 60% more memory and 3.5 times the processing speed, still in service at sea in 2010.

=== Semiconductors ===
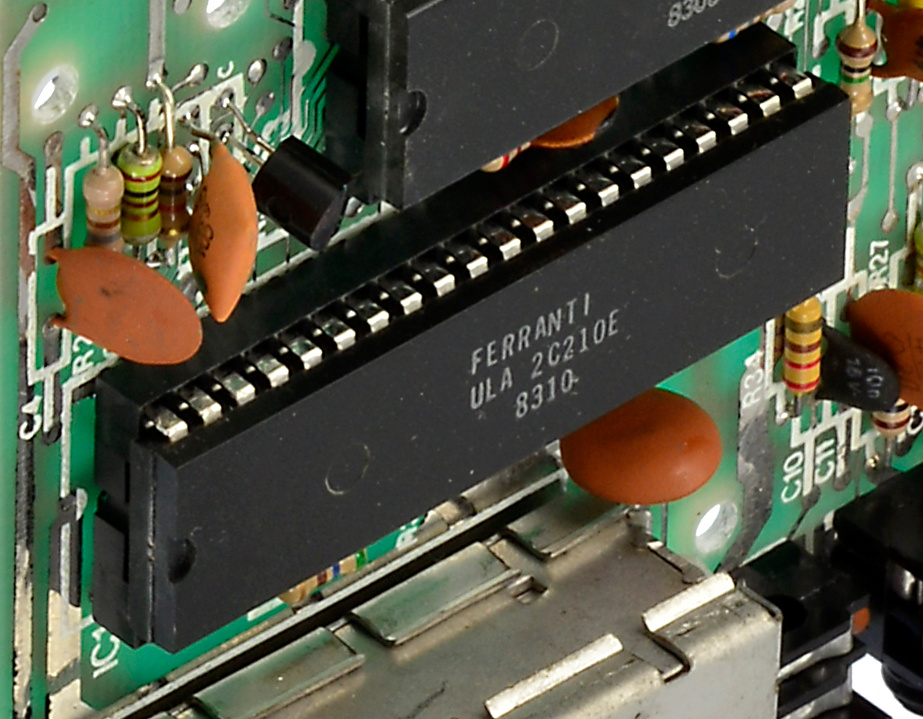
Ferranti ULA 2C210E on a Sinclair ZX81 (a.k.a. Timex Sinclair 1000) motherboard

Ferranti had been involved in the production of electronic devices, including radio valves, cathode-ray tubes and germanium semiconductors for some time before it became the first European company to produce a silicon diode, in 1955. In 1972, they launched the ZN414, a single-chip AM radio integrated circuit in a three-pin package.

Ferranti Semiconductor Ltd. went on to produce a range of silicon bipolar devices, including, in 1977, the Ferranti F100-L, an early 16-bit microprocessor with 16-bit addressing. An F100-L was carried into space on the amateur radio satellite UoSAT-1 (OSCAR 9). Ferranti's ZTX series bipolar transistors gave their name to the inheritor of Ferranti Semiconductor's discrete semiconductor business, Zetex Semiconductors plc.

In the early 1980s, Ferranti produced some of the first large uncommitted logic arrays (ULAs), used in home computers such as the Sinclair ZX81, Sinclair ZX Spectrum, Acorn Electron and BBC Micro. The microelectronics business was sold to Plessey in November 1987.

=== Acquisition of International Signal and Control and collapse ===
In November 1987, Ferranti purchased International Signal and Control (ISC), a United States defence contractor based in Pennsylvania. The company subsequently changed its name to Ferranti International PLC. and restructured the combined business into the following divisions: Ferranti Computer Systems, Ferranti Defence Systems, Ferranti Dynamics, Ferranti Satcomms, Ferranti Telecoms, Ferranti Technologies and International Signal and Control.

Unknown to Ferranti, ISC's business primarily consisted of illegal arms sales started at the behest of various US clandestine organizations. While on paper, the company looked to be extremely profitable on sales of high-priced "above board" items, however, these profits were essentially non-existent. As a result of the acquisition by Ferranti, all illegal sales ended immediately, leaving the company with no obvious cash flow.

In September 1989, Ferranti announced that it had discovered evidence of "serious irregularities" relating to ISC. Shortly thereafter, the UK's Serious Fraud Office launched a criminal investigation regarding the alleged substantial fraud committed by ISC. In December 1991, James Guerin, founder of ISC and co-chairman of the merged company, pleaded guilty before the federal court in Philadelphia to fraud committed both in the US and UK. All offences which would have formed part of any UK prosecution were encompassed by the US trial and as such no UK trial proceeded.

The financial and legal difficulties that resulted from the ISC acquisition pushed Ferranti into a vulnerable financial position and permanently weakened the company. This left to third parties, such as the General Electric Company (GEC), to investigate its acquisition. The GEC did acquire the Ferranti Defence Systems Group in January 1990 as well as part of Ferranti International's assets in Italy.

In October 1993, in response to Ferranti's continued poor financial position, the GEC submitted a conditional offer for Ferranti International itself, valuing the company at 1p per share. However, the GEC subsequently withdrew this bid, leaving Ferranti with no alternative options but to declare bankruptcy and enter receivership in December 1993.

== Operations ==
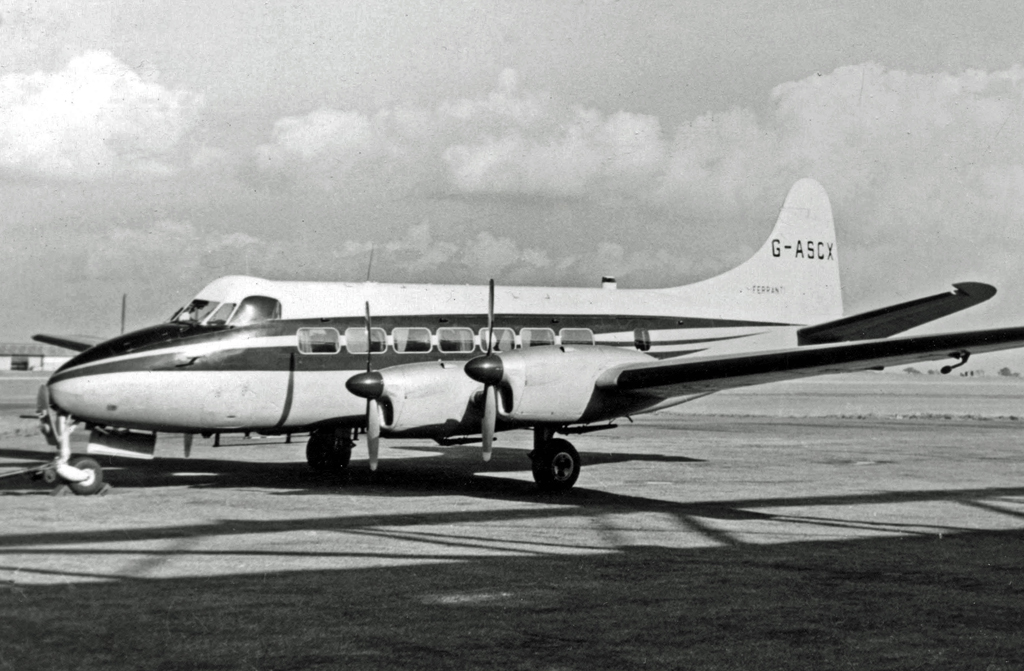
De Havilland Heron operated from Manchester Airport 1962–1970 as an executive transport, particularly between the factories in Lancashire and Scotland. The company name is on the lower fin.

The company had factories in Greater Manchester at Hollinwood, Moston, Chadderton (Gem Mill), Waterhead (Cairo Mill), Derker, Wythenshawe, Cheadle Heath, West Gorton, and Poynton. Eventually it set up branch-plants in Edinburgh (Silverknowes, Crewe Toll, Gyle, Granton and Robertson Avenue factories, plus its own hangar facility at Turnhouse Airport), Dalkeith, Aberdeen, Dundee, Kinbuck (near Dunblane), Bracknell, Barrow in Furness and Cwmbran as well as Germany and the United States (inc. Ferranti International Controls Corporation in Sugar Land, Texas) and several British Commonwealth countries including Canada, Australia and Singapore.

Ferranti Australia was based in Revesby, Sydney NSW. There was also a primarily defence-related branch office in South Australia.

Products manufactured by Ferranti Defence Systems included cockpit displays (moving map, head-down, head-up) video cameras and recorders, gunsight cameras, motion detectors, pilot's night vision goggles, integrated helmets, and pilot's stick controls.

On the Tornado aircraft, Ferranti supplied the radar transmitter and scanner, inertial navigation system, LRMTS, TIALD pod, mission recording equipment, and cockpit displays.

== Current ownership of former Ferranti businesses ==
- Ferranti Autocourt: Acquired by Wayne Dresser, renamed to Wayne Autocourt, before Autocourt name dropped
- Ferranti Communications: Acquired by Thorn and branded Thorn Communications and Telecontrol Systems (CATS). Later acquired by Tyco International and renamed Tyco Communications. Still operating under the name TS Technology Services.
- Ferranti Computer Systems:The Belgian subsidiary lives on as Ferranti Computer System and as of 1994 is part of the Nijkerk Holding. The remainder was acquired out of administration by SYSECA, the IT arm of Thomson-CSF and renamed Ferranti-SYSECA Ltd.. Later, the Ferranti name was dropped and when Thomson changed its name to Thales Group, SYSECA became Thales Information Systems. Thales Information Systems later sold its German interest to Consinto Gmbh. The department dealing with airport systems was bought by Datel in around 1995 and continued to trade under the name Ferranti Airport Systems until it was bought by Ultra Electronics. Other parts of Ferranti Computer Systems were acquired out of administration by GEC-Marconi. Parts of the former Ferranti entities became part of a Joint Venture that has now been dissolved and the former Ferranti entities are now part of BAE Systems Integrated System Technologies (Insyte).
- Ferranti Defence Systems: Acquired by GEC-Marconi was renamed GEC Ferranti, later becoming part of GEC Marconi Avionics (GMAv) and finally was renamed Marconi Electronic Systems (MES). When GEC-Marconi merged its defence-related businesses with British Aerospace BAe in 1999 a new company BAE Systems was created. Circa 2007 the BAE Systems board decided to divest itself of “non-core business” and parts of the former Ferranti entities including the heritage Ferranti operation, was acquired by Finmeccanica in 2007 and renamed SELEX Galileo, then Selex ES, then becoming part of Leonardo. At one time there were design offices at Silverknowes, Robertson Avenue, South Gyle 1 and 2, Crewe Toll, Granton. After BAE Systems was formed the remaining factories at South Gyle were sold off and the staff made redundant despite their ground breaking work on the Avionics and Helmet for EFA and Aircraft Mission Computers.
- Ferranti Dynamics: Acquired by GEC-Marconi in 1992
- Ferranti Electronics (Ceramic Seals division): Acquired by Ceramic Seals Limited in 1990.
- Ferranti Instrumentation: Dissolved. Some assets acquired by GEC-Marconi and Ravenfield Designs
- Ferranti Tapchangers Ltd: Independent company, then acquired by UK-based grid control specialists Fundamentals Ltd Ferranti Tapchangers Ltd | Welcome in 2017
- Ferranti Satcomms: Acquired out of administration by Matra Marconi Space in 1994
- Ferranti Technologies: Was bought out by management and continues in Rochdale specialising in avionics, defence electronics, and electronic power systems. It was acquired by Elbit Systems in 2007. After direct action by Palestine Action targeting their Oldham site, it was sold to TT Electronics in January 2022, moving site to Rochdale at end of 2023.
- Ferranti Air Systems: Acquired by Datel then turned into an independent company. Later bought by Ultra Electronics. In 2019, it acquired by ADB Safegate. In 2026, this was then acquired by Modaxo, a Toronto-based company.
- Ferranti Thomson Sonar Systems: A 50% share was acquired by GEC-Marconi. Now owned by Thales and renamed Thales Underwater Systems.
- Ferranti Helicopters: Acquired by British Caledonian Airways in April 1979 to become British Caledonian Helicopters which was in turn acquired by Bristow Helicopters in 1987
- Ferranti Subsea Systems: Management buyout in the early 1990s, renamed FSSL. Kværner bought more shares in 1994 and then turned to Kværner FSSL. Kværner is now known as Aker Solutions
- Ferranti Computer Systems Service Department: This was acquired by the third party maintenance company ServiceTec. The regional Service Centres were rebranded as ServiceTec and all of the service engineers and management were taken on. The support of the Argus computers dominated activities although new (non-Argus) business was added to the regional centres. The repair centre at Cairo Mill also became part of the ServiceTec group, ultimately as a separate entity.
- Ferranti Semiconductors: Became Zetex Semiconductors after a management buyout in 1989. In 2008, it was acquired by Diodes Inc.
- Ferranti Photonics Ltd.: Independent, liquidated after bankruptcy in 2005

== Other uses of the Ferranti name ==
A number of uses of the Ferranti name remain in use. In Edinburgh, the Ferranti Edinburgh Recreation Club (FERC), the Ferranti Mountaineering Club and the Ferranti Ten-pin Bowling League are still in existence. While these organisations no longer have any formal ties with the companies which subsumed the Ferranti companies which operated in Edinburgh, they still operate under the old names.

Ferranti Thistle F.C. was formed in 1943 and joined the Scottish Football League in 1974. Due to strict sponsorship rules it changed its name to Meadowbank Thistle F.C., and later to Livingston F.C.

Denis Ferranti Meters Limited is still (2021) owned by a direct descendant of Sebastian de Ferranti but is not directly related to the major Ferranti corporation. The company has over 200 employees that manufacture BT's public phones, oil pumps for large industrial vehicles, electric motors for motorbility solutions, electronics, and small MOD equipment.
