= Thales Underwater Systems =

Division of Thales Group

Thales Underwater Systems or TUS (formerly Thomson Sintra ASM, Thomson CSF DASM and then Thomson Marconi Sonar) is a subsidiary of the French defense electronics specialist Thales Group. It was founded in 2001 and belongs to its naval division. It specializes in the development and manufacturing of sonar systems for submarines, surface warships and aircraft, as well as communications masts and systems for submarines. Its headquarters are located in Sophia Antipolis, France.

Thales Underwater Systems is made up of three branches: TUS SAS in France with sites in Brest and Aubagne; TUS Ltd. in the United Kingdom with sites in Cheadle Heath and Templecombe; and finally TUS Pty in Australia. It nonetheless operates as a single company.

The company generated €400 million in revenue in 2006 and employed around 2,100 people.

== Background ==
In 1996, Thomson Marconi Sonar was formed by the merger of the sonar systems businesses of French defence electronics specialist Thomson-CSF and British company GEC-Marconi after the payment of a balance by the latter. It was 50.1% owned by Thomson-CSF and 49.9% by GEC-Marconi. Denis Ranque was appointed CEO of the joint venture. The new company would head 3 operational entities:

- The French entity, Thomson Sintra, brought in by Thomson-CSF, was the European leader in defence-related sonar systems and the world's second after Lockheed Martin Loral, with annual sales of 1.5 billion francs, split between submarine sonars (35%), anti-submarine warfare systems (27%), airborne sonars (18%) and mine warfare (15%).
- The British entity was made up of GEC-Marconi's sonar division, which had annual sales of 90 million pounds (700 million francs) as well as a company already co-owned by it and Thomson-CSF called Ferranti Thomson Sonar Systems (with about 400 million francs in sales).
- A third entity in Australia, called TMS Pty, was composed of the two groups' establishments operating in the sector.

With the merger of GEC's defence business Marconi Electronic Systems and British Aerospace in 1999, the resulting BAE Systems acquired Marconi's 49.9% share in TMS. BAE, through an options agreement, forced Thomson-CSF (now called Thales) to purchase its stake in 2001. The company therefore became entirely owned by Thales and was renamed Thales Underwater Systems.

== TUS SAS (France) ==
=== Sophia Antipolis ===
Thales Underwater Systems is headquartered in Sophia Antipolis, southern France. It was also, alongside Brest, one of Thomson Sintra's main sites. This continues to be the case with TUS SAS.

=== Brest ===
Brest has been a major center of Thales' naval activities as well as those of its predecessor entities since the 1960s. The site has not stopped evolving since 1963. Opened as part of the Breton electronics plan in order to develop a local industry centered around airborne systems and underwater combat systems to compensate for the difficulties encountered in agriculture, it had since then the mission of producing military electronic equipment, including the first radar exclusively dedicated to maritime patrol, which left the workshops in 1965.

Today, Thales' site in Brest is essentially dedicated to research and development. With some 1,000 engineers out of the 1,600 employees as of 2013, the four main areas of activity are mine warfare, submarine warfare, electronic warfare, and airborne maritime patrol and maritime surveillance. These include the development of minecountermeasures sonar, sonar buoys data processing and dipping sonars for submarine detection.

== TUS Ltd. (United Kingdom) ==
TUS Ltd. has two main sites, Cheadle Heath near Stockport, Greater Manchester and Templecombe in Somerset. The company had a turnover of around £85 million with a total of 853 staff in 2006.

=== Cheadle Heath ===
The Cheadle Heath site was set up in 1977 as an overspill of the Ferranti Military Systems Division based at Wythenshawe. It comprised groups covering training simulators, communication systems and a small Underwater Systems Group which was engaged in the development of displays and computer interfaces for sonars equipment. The main parts of these sonars were developed by the Plessey Marine Research Unit at Templecombe, Somerset.

The sonar work at the Cheadle Heath site expanded into digital signal processing, algorithm development, display generation, simulation, LCD and TV displays, mass storage, computer interfaces and highways. Takeovers of other companies brought new expertise in sonar arrays. The Sonar Systems Group increased in size and successfully bid against Plessey for parts of sonar 2054. Other parts of the Ferranti empire started to crumble, aided by the merger with International Signal (James Guerin) in 1987 to form Ferranti International. Ferranti eventually went bankrupt (again) in 1993, however the small, idiosyncratic Sonar Systems Group had become a successful standalone business. A Joint Venture Company was formed between the Ferranti liquidators (49.9%) and Thomson-CSF (50.1%) to form Ferranti Thomson Sonar Systems. The Ferranti share was bought out by GEC-Marconi to become Thomson Marconi Sonar Systems.

FTSS had outstations at Weymouth for aquaculture sonar and other special systems. This is now closed along with its Church Crookham site.

The site is now a combined focal hypocentre for both the Underwater and Information systems division.

=== Templecombe ===
The Templecombe part of TUS started life in 1965 as the Marine Systems Research Unit of the Marine Systems Division of the Plessey Company, then it became Plessey Marine Research Unit, and Plessey Marine, before becoming Plessey Naval Systems, producing sonar and other related systems. The Marine Systems Division was established in 1961 at Uppark Drive Ilford but originated in a specialist underwater unit formed by the Plessey Company in 1948. The sites at Ilford carried out manufacturing and support of the older sonars, such as Type 195, and the Mark 44 torpedo. A manufacturing and support site at Newport, Wales was set up for later sonars and gradually the sites at Ilford closed. The headquarters of Plessey Marine was transferred to Templecombe.

Plessey took over a company called Ameeco Hydrospace in the 1970s which specialised in building towed arrays. This had sites in Andover and Gillingham. The sites at Andover were eventually closed and the work transferred to Newport.

Plessey Naval Systems was taken over in 1989 by GEC-Marconi, the defence arm of GEC, to eventually merge with Marconi Underwater Systems Ltd.

After a joint venture between Thomson-CSF and Ferranti was created in the early 1990s (Ferranti Thomson Sonar Systems), GEC-Marconi acquired Ferranti's share. The sonar systems businesses of Thomson and GEC-Marconi then merged to become Thomson Marconi Sonar (TMS).

In 1999, as part of the merger of Marconi Electronic Systems (as GEC-Marconi had become), and British Aerospace, the newly formed BAE Systems held 49.9% of TMS, which it sold to Thales (the new name for Thomson-CSF) in 2001. Thomson Marconi Sonar was renamed Thales Underwater Systems and the original part of Marconi Underwater Systems Ltd became part of BAE Systems. And Templecombe became the main site of TUS Ltd in the UK.

The original site at Templecombe was at Wilkinthroop House and later because of expansion a site at Throop Road was added. The Throop Road site was previously the railyard of the Somerset and Dorset Railway. The other railway line from London to Exeter, which the line joined linked to is still operational, and Templecombe station is still used today.

Because of restrictions at the former site, all work was later transferred to the latter one and Wilkinthroop House sold off. A flooded quarry at Waterlip was acquired as a test site in the 1960s but problems led to testing being transferred to a site at Vobster. However, further problems there led to testing resuming at Waterlip. The Newport site was closed and manufacturing transferred back to Templecombe. In addition there have been sites in Bath (due to the then-proximity to MoD offices in and around the city, now entirely moved to DESG MoD Abbey Wood) for Prime Contract Management and a Joint Plessey Ferranti Office at Portland to support the Admiralty Research Establishment, but both are now closed. Plessey Naval Systems also had a site at Carlsbad California for USN support.

=== Church Crookham ===
One of the sites of Ferranti Thomson Sonar Systems, but a relatively small site within Thales. The Church Crookham site housed a production and test facility for towed array sonars and submarine flank arrays, a design department, and a special projects section. It was involved in Sonar 2076, and for a period provided acoustic calibration services for naval vessels. Now closed.

== TUS Pty (Australia) ==
=== Meadowbank ===
This was the main manufacturing facility until 1995 when it was transferred to Rydalmere. The Meadowbank facility has since closed and has been redeveloped into residential apartments.

=== Rydalmere ===
This is the headquarters of TUS in Australia.

== Products ==
- Dipping sonar (such as that for the Merlin helicopter)
- Minehunting Sonars (such as Type 2093, Type 2193, TSM 2022 Mk3)
- Sonar Type 2016 (surface; originally Type 22 Frigates)
- Sonar Type 2020 (Trafalgar and Swiftsure class of Hunter/Killer Submarines)
- Mine and obstacle avoidance sonar for surface ships (TSM 5424 Petrel sonar)
- Sonars for conventional submarines (S Cube SSK)
- Surface ship towed array sonar (Sonar 2087, CAPTAS)
- Medium frequency ASW sonar (Spherion)
- Torpedo sonars
- Torpedo detection sonar (Sea Defender)
- Submarine sonar (Type 2076)
- Underwater communications sonars
- Sonobuoys/processors
- Swimmer detection sonar
- Synthetic aperture sonar (DUBM-44)
- Unmanned underwater vehicle sonar
- Autonomous/towed training sources
- Submarine communication masts
- Submarine-launched buoys
- Vehicle mount antennas
- SATCOM Antennas

== Sites ==
- Brest, France
- Sophia-Antipolis, France
- Templecombe, Somerset, UK
- Cheadle Heath, Greater Manchester, UK
- Meadowbank, New South Wales, Australia
- Rydalmere, New South Wales, Australia.
