= PS-02/A =

Type of aircraft radar

PS-02/A is the Swedish designation for the French Thomson-CSF Cyrano radar bought for the J35A Draken in the early 1960s. The radar was connected to a Swedish sight called 6B.

== Specifications ==
The radar had a range of 24 km and targets were normally detected at 24 km. It had one scan mode with 60-degree sweep and one targeting mode with an 8-degree scan pattern. After locking on the system sent targeting data to the onboard weapons system.
