= Zetex Semiconductors =

British transistor and diode manufacturer

Zetex Semiconductors plc is a UK-based manufacturer of discrete semiconductor devices such as diodes and transistors.

== Corporate history ==
Originally a subsidiary of Ferranti Semiconductor, Zetex took its name from Ferranti's ZTX series of bipolar transistors. It was sold to Plessey in 1988, then bought out by management in 1989 to become Zetex plc. At this point it owned two manufacturing sites in Oldham: Gem Mill and Lansdowne Road. It then became a subsidiary of Telemetrix plc, until in 2004 it changed its name to Zetex Semiconductors plc. In 2008 it was acquired by Dallas-based Diodes Incorporated for $176 million.

London Stock Exchange symbol: ZTX
