= Thomson Marconi Sonar =

Sonar systems conglomerate

Thomson Marconi Sonar NV
- Founded: 1990
- Defunct: October 2001
- Successor: Thales Underwater Systems

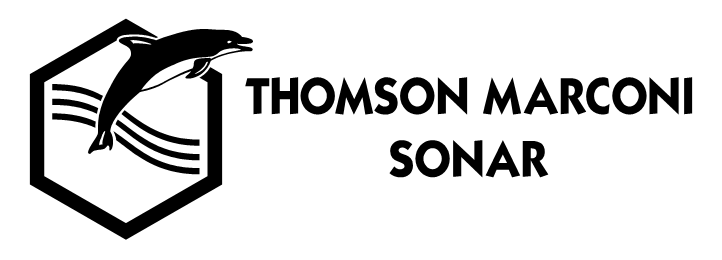
Thomson Marconi Sonar Logo

Thomson Marconi Sonar or TMS was formed in 1996 by the merger of the sonar systems businesses of French defence electronics specialist Thomson-CSF and British company GEC-Marconi after the payment of a balance by the latter. The new company was 50.1% owned by Thomson-CSF and 49.9% by GEC-Marconi. Denis Ranque was appointed as its CEO. The new company would head 3 operational entities:

- The French entity, Thomson Sintra (based in Brest and Sophia Antipolis), was brought in by Thomson-CSF. It was the European leader in defence-related sonar systems and the world's second after Lockheed Martin Loral, with annual sales of 1.5 billion francs, split between submarine sonars (35%), anti-submarine warfare systems or ASM (27%), mine warfare (15%) and airborne sonars (18%).
- The British entity was made up of GEC-Marconi's sonar division, which had annual sales of 90 million pounds (700 million francs) as well as a company already co-owned by it and Thomson-CSF called Ferranti Thomson Sonar Systems (with about 400 million francs in sales).
- A third entity in Australia, called TMS Pty, was composed of the two groups' establishments operating in the sector.

With the merger of GEC's defence business Marconi Electronic Systems and British Aerospace in 1999, the resulting BAE Systems acquired Marconi's 49.9% share in TMS. BAE, through an options agreement, forced Thomson-CSF (now Thales) to purchase its stake in 2001. The company therefore became entirely owned by Thales and was renamed Thales Underwater Systems.

== Products ==
- Submarine sonar and surface ship sonar
- Minehunter sonar
- Airborne acoustic processors and dipping sonars (helicopter applications)
- Sonar support systems and trainers
- Communication systems
