= AGM-45 Shrike =

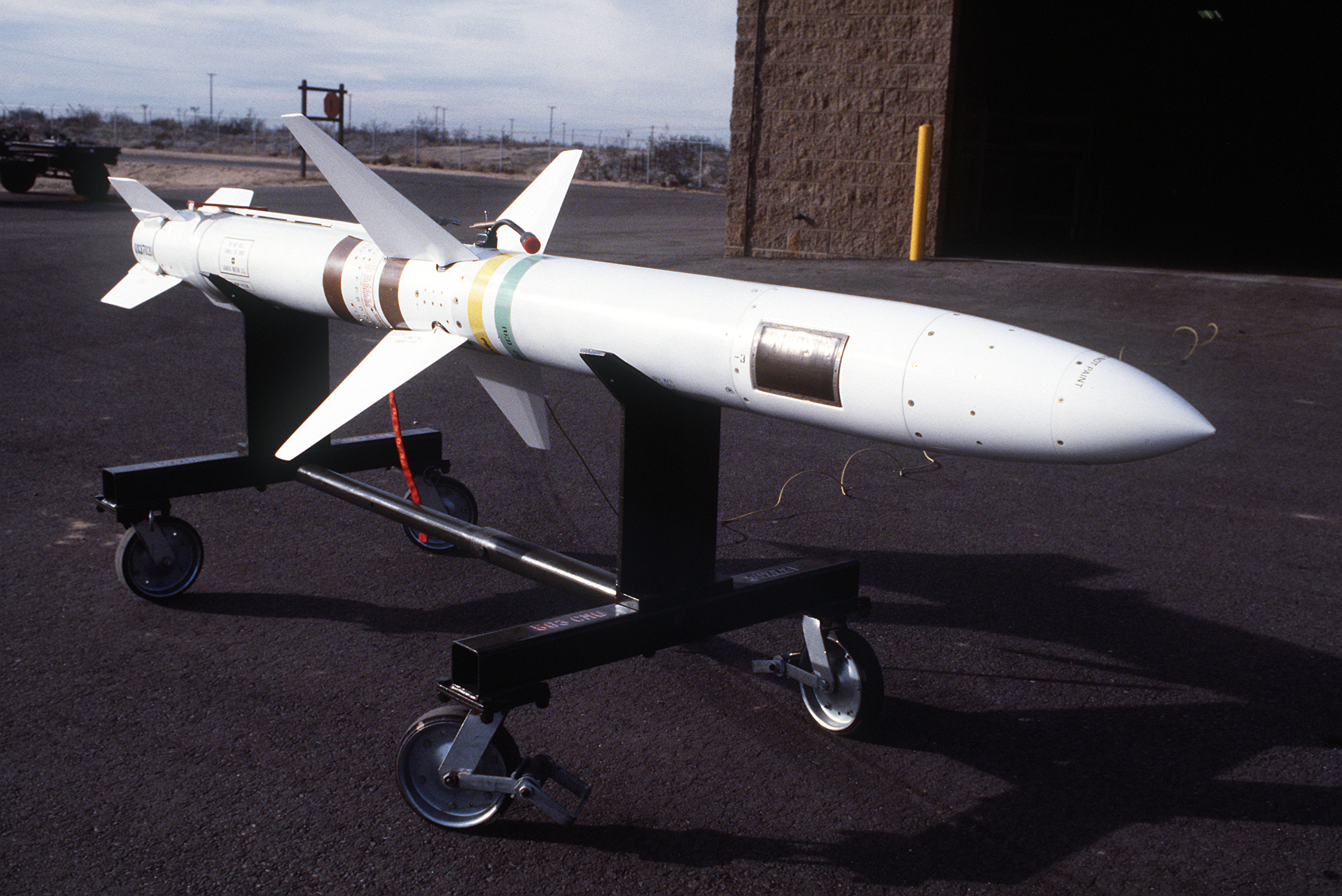
- AGM-45 Shrike
- Type: Air-to-surface anti-radiation missile
- Place of origin: United States

Service history
- In service: 1965–1992
- Wars: Cold War; Vietnam War; Yom Kippur War; Iran–Iraq War; Falklands War; Operation El Dorado Canyon; Gulf War

Production history
- Designed: 1963
- Manufacturer: Texas Instruments and Sperry Rand/Univac
- Produced: 1963-1982
- No. built: 18,500

Specifications
- Mass: 390 pounds (177.06 kg)
- Length: 10 feet (3.05 m)
- Diameter: 8 inches (203 mm)
- Wingspan: 3 feet (914 mm)
- Warhead: 67.5 kg (149 lb) MK 5 MOD 1 (or MK 86 MOD 1) blast-fragmentation, or 66.6 kg (147 lb) WAU-9/B blast-fragmentation
- Operational range: 16 km (9.9 mi) AGM-45A, 40 km (24.85 mi) AGM-45B
- Maximum speed: Mach 1.5 (1852 km/h)
- Guidance system: Passive radar homing
- Accuracy: 20ft
- Launch platform: A-4 Skyhawk, A-6 Intruder, LTV A-7 Corsair II, F-100 Super Sabre, F-105 Thunderchief, F-4 Phantom II, Avro Vulcan (not regular service), F-16 Fighting Falcon, Kfir, Kilshon system

AGM-45 Shrike is an American anti-radiation missile designed to home in on hostile anti-aircraft radar. The Shrike was developed by the Naval Weapons Center at China Lake in 1963 by mating a seeker head to the rocket body of an AIM-7 Sparrow. It was phased out by U.S. in 1992 and at an unknown time by the Israeli Air Force (the only other major user), and has been superseded by the AGM-88 HARM missile. The Israel Defense Forces developed a version of the Shrike that could be ground-launched with a booster rocket, and mounted it on an M4 Sherman chassis as the Kilshon (Hebrew for "trident").

== History ==
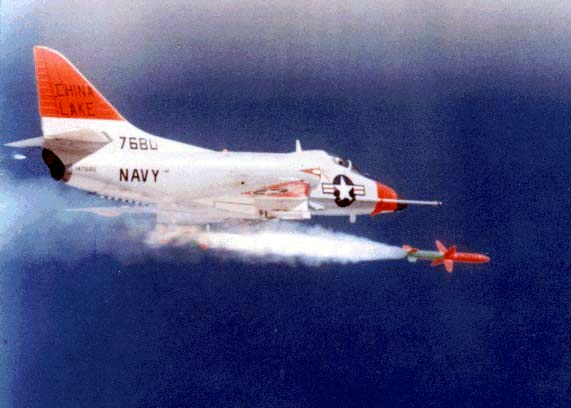
A-4 Skyhawk launching an AGM-45 Shrike

The Shrike was first employed during the Vietnam War by the Navy in 1965 using the Douglas A-4 Skyhawk. The Air Force adopted the weapon the following year using F-105F and G Thunderchief Wild Weasel defense suppression aircraft, and later the F-4 Phantom II in the same role. The range was nominally shorter than the SA-2 Guideline missiles that the system was used against, although it was a great improvement over the early method of attacking SAM sites with rockets and bombs from F-100F Super Sabres. A Shrike was typically lofted about 30 degrees above the horizon at a Fan Song radar some 15 miles (25 km) away for a flight time of 50 seconds. Tactics changed incrementally over the campaigns of 1966 and 1967 until the advent of the AGM-78 Standard ARM. That new weapon allowed launches from significantly longer range with a much easier attack profile, as the Standard could be launched up to 180 degrees off target and still expect a hit and its speed allowed it to travel faster than the SA-2. Even after the Standard missile entered service, the Weasels still carried the Shrike because the Standard cost about $200,000, while a Shrike cost only $7,000. If USAF pilots expended a Standard they would have to fill out a lengthy form during debriefing. A somewhat standard load for the F-105G was a 650 US gal (2,500 L) centerline fuel tank, two Standards on inboard pylons and two Shrikes on the outboard pylons. The mix varied slightly for jamming pods and the occasional AIM-9 Sidewinder but this was the baseline.

In April 1972, China Lake was directed to design, test, and install a ship-launched version of Shrike for defense against North Vietnamese coastal gun batteries. The first weapon was fired at sea on 17 May, and fired in combat that August. Known as Shrike On-Board, this consisted of Aero-5B launchers mounted to the top of a ship's Mk 112 ASROC launcher. All were removed following the US withdrawal from Vietnam.

The Shrike was involved in a friendly fire incident during an airstrike on Haiphong on 15 April 1972. Two missiles struck USS Worden (CG-18) killing one crewman and injuring nine more. An American pilot apparently interpreted the PIRAZ cruiser's AN/SPG-55 radar as a North Vietnamese SAM site. Worden required ten days shipyard work at the Subic Bay Naval Base to repair.

Although the Shrike missile did not enter regular service with the United Kingdom, it was covertly supplied by the United States to the RAF for use in the Falklands War of 1982. RAF Shrikes were fitted to modified Vulcan bombers in order to attack Argentine radar installations during Operation Black Buck. The main target was a Westinghouse AN/TPS-43 long range 3D radar that the Argentine Air Force deployed during April to guard Falklands' airspace. The Argentine operators were aware of the anti-radiation missiles and would simply turn it off during the Vulcan's approaches. This radar remained intact during the whole conflict. However, air defences remained operational during the attacks and the Shrikes hit two of the less valuable and rapidly replaced secondary fire control radars. After one Vulcan made an emergency landing at Rio de Janeiro, Brazilian authorities confiscated a Shrike which was not returned.

About 95 AGM-45s were used in 1991 during Desert Storm against Iraqi air defense, mostly by F-4Gs.

== Variants ==
Shrike hitting a simulated target.

There are many subvariants, each tuned to a different radar band. Angle gating, used to prioritize targets, was included in every subvariant of the AGM-45A and B after the A-2 and B-2. It was also slow and the lack of punch in the warhead made it difficult for bomb damage assessment, as well as inflicting any damage to the Fan Song Radar vans beyond a shattered radar dish, an easy item to replace or repair. The short range, combined with its lack of speed (compared to the SA-2 SAM) made for a difficult attack. The missile had to be well within the range of the SAM radar and if a SAM was fired the SAM would get to the aircraft first. Also the missile had few tolerances and had to be launched no more than + or − 3 degrees from the target. Many pilots in Vietnam did not like the Shrike because of its limitations and its success rate of around 25%.

The differences between the AGM-45A and B are in the rocket motor used, and in the warheads capable of being fitted. The AGM-45A used the Rocketdyne Mk 39 Mod 0 (or apparently in some cases the Aerojet Mk 53 Mod 1) motor, while the AGM-45B used Aerojet Mk 78 Mod 0 which greatly increased the range of the missile. As for warheads, the Mk 5 Mod 0, Mk 86 Mod 0, and WAU-8/B could all be fitted to the AGM-45A and were all blast-fragmentation in nature. The AGM-45B made use of the improved Mk 5 Mod 1 and Mk 86 Mod 1 warheads, as well as, the WAU-9/B, again all blast-fragmentation in type.

The following table provides information on what radar bands were associated with certain guidance sections, and the subvariant designation.

Designation	Guidance Section	Targeted Bands	Primary Targets
AGM-45A-1	Mk 23 Mod 0	E/F Band	SON-9 "Fire Can", Fan Song
AGM-45A-2 AGM-45B-2	Mk 22 Mod 0/1/2	G Band	Fan Song
AGM-45A-3 AGM-45B-3	Mk 24 Mod 0/1/34	Broad E/F Band	P-35 radar "Bar Lock", Fan Song
AGM-45A-3A AGM-45B-3A	Mk 24 Mod 2/5	Narrow E/F Band	P-35 radar "Bar Lock", Fan Song
AGM-45A-3B AGM-45B-3B	Mk 24 Mod 3	E/F Band	P-35 radar "Bar Lock", Fan Song
AGM-45A-4 AGM-45B-4	Mk 25 Mod 0/1	G Band	Fan Song
AGM-45A-6 AGM-45B-6	Mk 36 Mod 1	I Band	SNR-125 "Low Blow"
AGM-45A-7 AGM-45B-7	Mk 37 Mod 0	E/F Band	P-15 radar "Flat Face"
AGM-45A-9 AGM-45B-9	Mk 49 Mod 0	I Band	SNR-125 "Low Blow", 1S91 "Straight Flush"
AGM-45A-9A AGM-45B-9A	Mk 49 Mod 1	I Band, "G bias"	
AGM-45A-10 AGM-45B-10	Mk 50 Mod 0	E Band to I Band	Various

The -5 (targeted at Fan Song and M-11 Shtorm ("Head Lights") and -8 (targeted at P-18 radar "Spoon Rest" and P-14 radar ("Tall King") weapons never left development.

== Operators ==
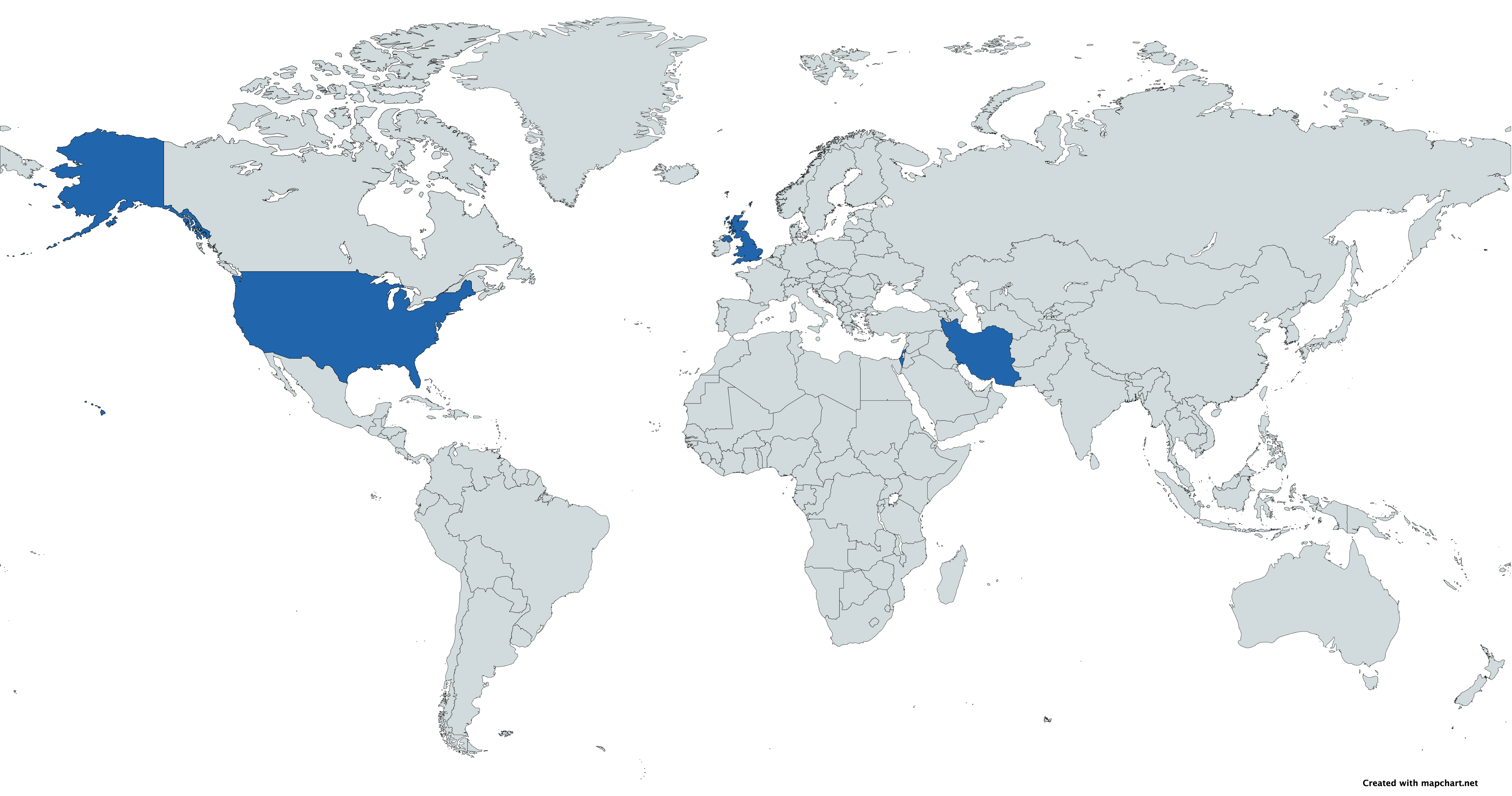
A map with operators of the AGM-45 Shrike in blue

- Iran
- Israel
- United Kingdom
- United States

== See also ==
- International Signal and Control
