= Diodes Incorporated =

American semiconductor manufacturer

- Type: Public
- Traded as: Nasdaq: DIOD; S&P 600 component Russell 2000 Index component
- Industry: Semiconductors
- Founded: 1959; 67 years ago^{1}
- Headquarters: Plano, Texas, United States
- Area served: Worldwide
- Key people: Gary Yu (President, and CEO)
- Products: High-quality application specific standard products within the broad semiconductor analog and power solutions markets.
- Revenue: ▲$1.5 Billion USD (2025)
- Operating income: ▲$35.4 Million USD (2025)
- Net income: ▲$69 Million USD (2025)
- Number of employees: About 8,000 (2025)
- Website: diodes.com
- Footnotes^{1} Incorporated in California in 1959, reincorporated in Delaware in 1968

Diodes Incorporated is a global manufacturer and supplier of application specific standard products within the analog, discrete, power, logic, and mixed-signal semiconductor markets. Diodes serves the consumer electronics, computing, communications, industrial, and automotive markets.

Diodes' products include diodes, rectifiers, transistors, MOSFETs, protection devices, functional specific arrays, single gate logic, amplifiers and comparators, Hall effect and temperature sensors, isolation products; power management devices, including LED drivers, AC-DC converters and controllers, DC-DC switching and linear voltage regulators, and voltage references along with special function devices, such as USB power switches, load switches, voltage supervisors, and motor controllers. Diodes Incorporated also has timing, connectivity, switching, and signal integrity solutions for high-speed signals. In January 2024, the company announced three dual-channel power-switches.

The company's product focus is on end-user equipment markets such as satellite TV set-top boxes, portable DVD players, datacom devices, ADSL modems, power supplies, medical devices (non-life support devices/systems), PCs and notebooks, flat panel displays, digital cameras, mobile handsets, AC-to-DC and DC-to-DC conversion, Wireless 802.11 LAN access points, brushless DC motor fans, serial connectivity, and automotive applications.

Over the years, Diodes Incorporated grew by acquiring other semiconductor companies. Notable acquisitions include Zetex Semiconductors (2008), Power Analog Microelectronics, Inc. (2012), Pericom Semiconductor (2015), Texas Instruments' Greenock wafer fabrication plant (2019), and Lite-On Semiconductor (2020).

On 3 June 2022, Diodes completed the acquisition of the South Portland wafer fabrication facility, and its operations from onsemi, known as SPFAB. This also included the transfer of all its employees there.

On 26 December 2023, Diodes announced that Gary Yu would become president as of 2 January 2024 and Dr. Keh Shew Lu will remain chairman and CEO until at least 31 May 2027.

In Q4 of 2024, Diodes also completed the acquisition of Fortemedia.

Most recently, Diodes announced that Gary Yu would become CEO effective May 14, 2025 and Dr. Keh-Shew Lu will continue to serve as Chairman of the Board.

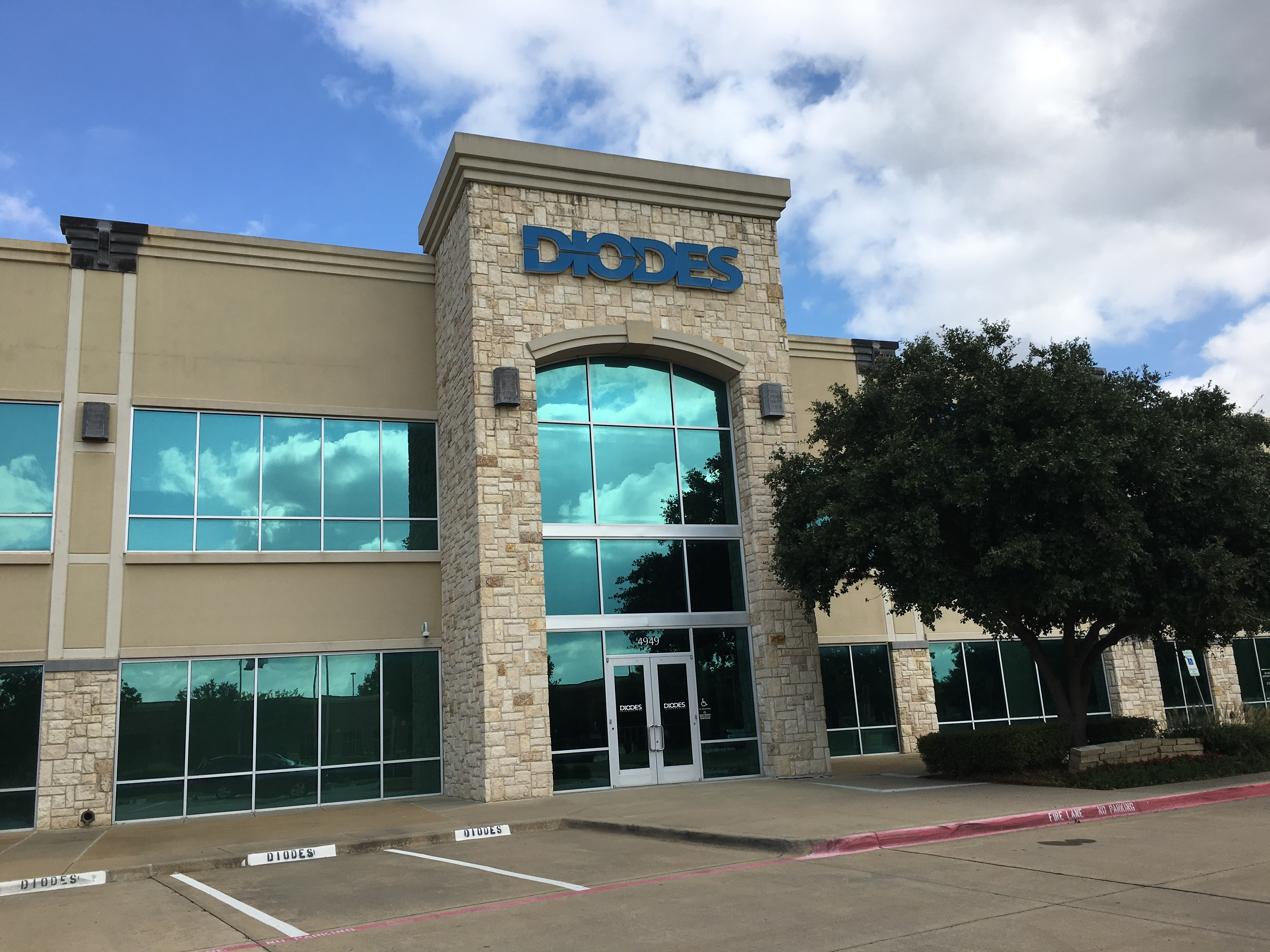
Diodes Incorporated in Plano, Texas

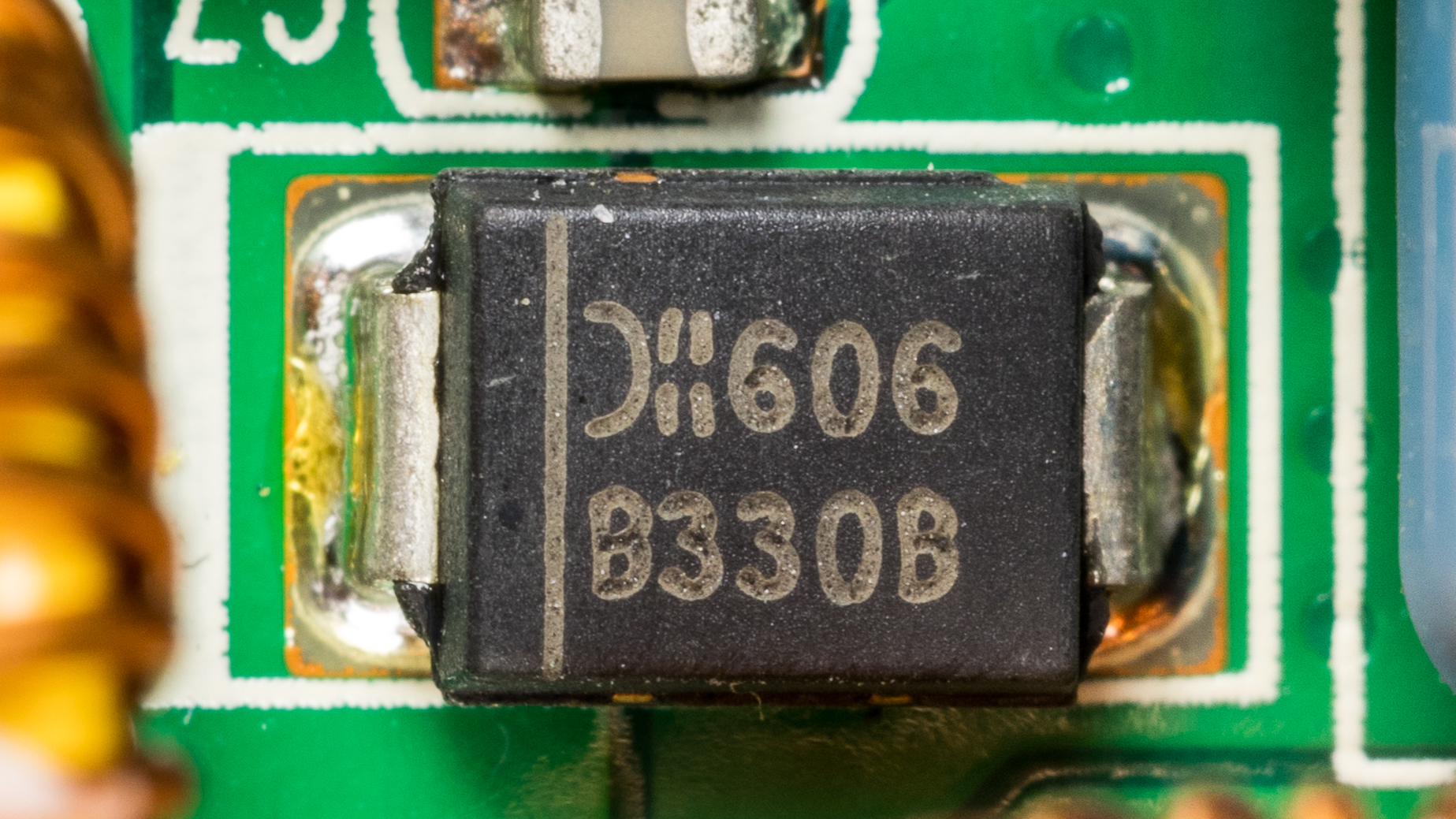
SMD Schottky diode with Diodes Inc. marking

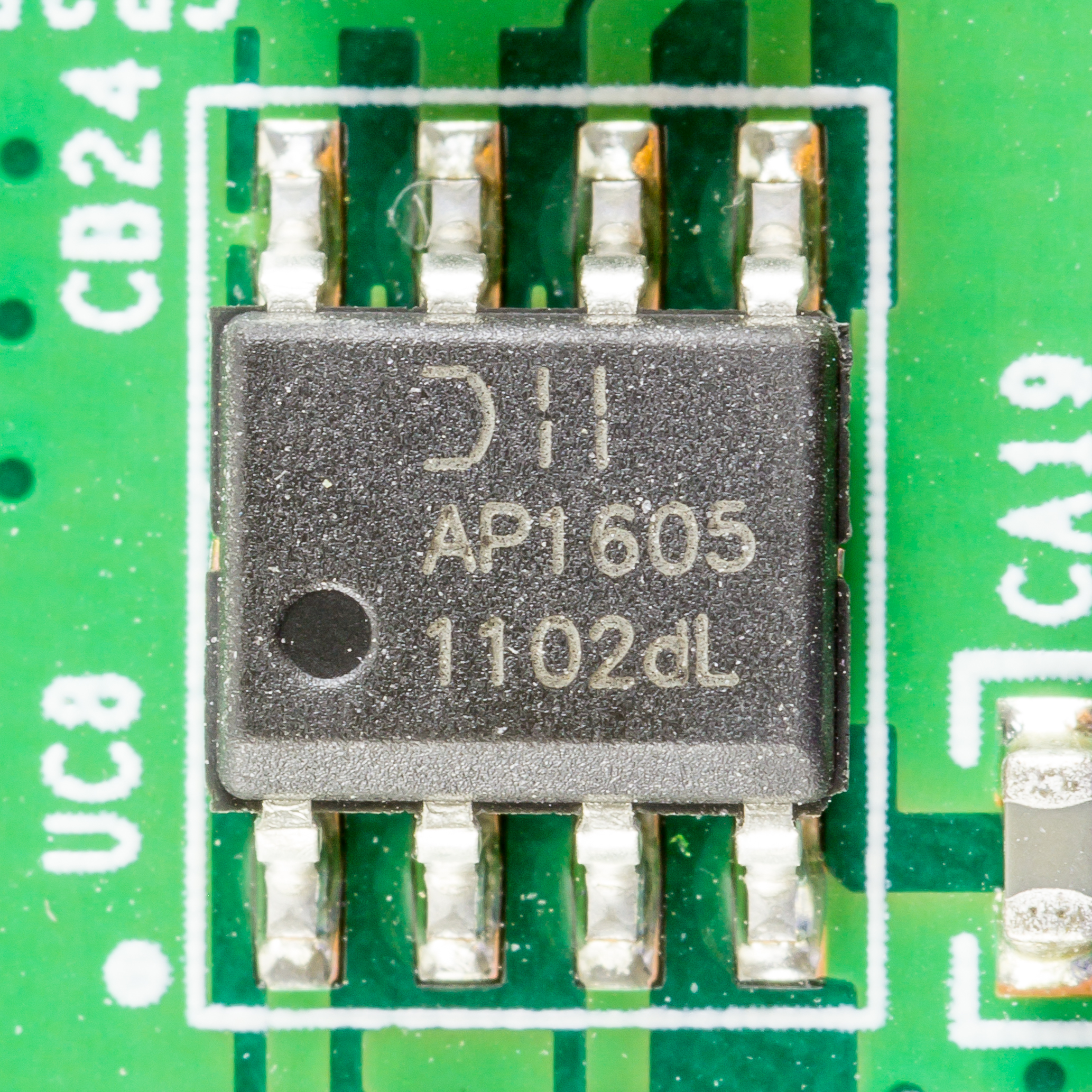
Integrated circuit with Diodes Inc. marking
