= Denis Ranque =

French businessman (born 1952)

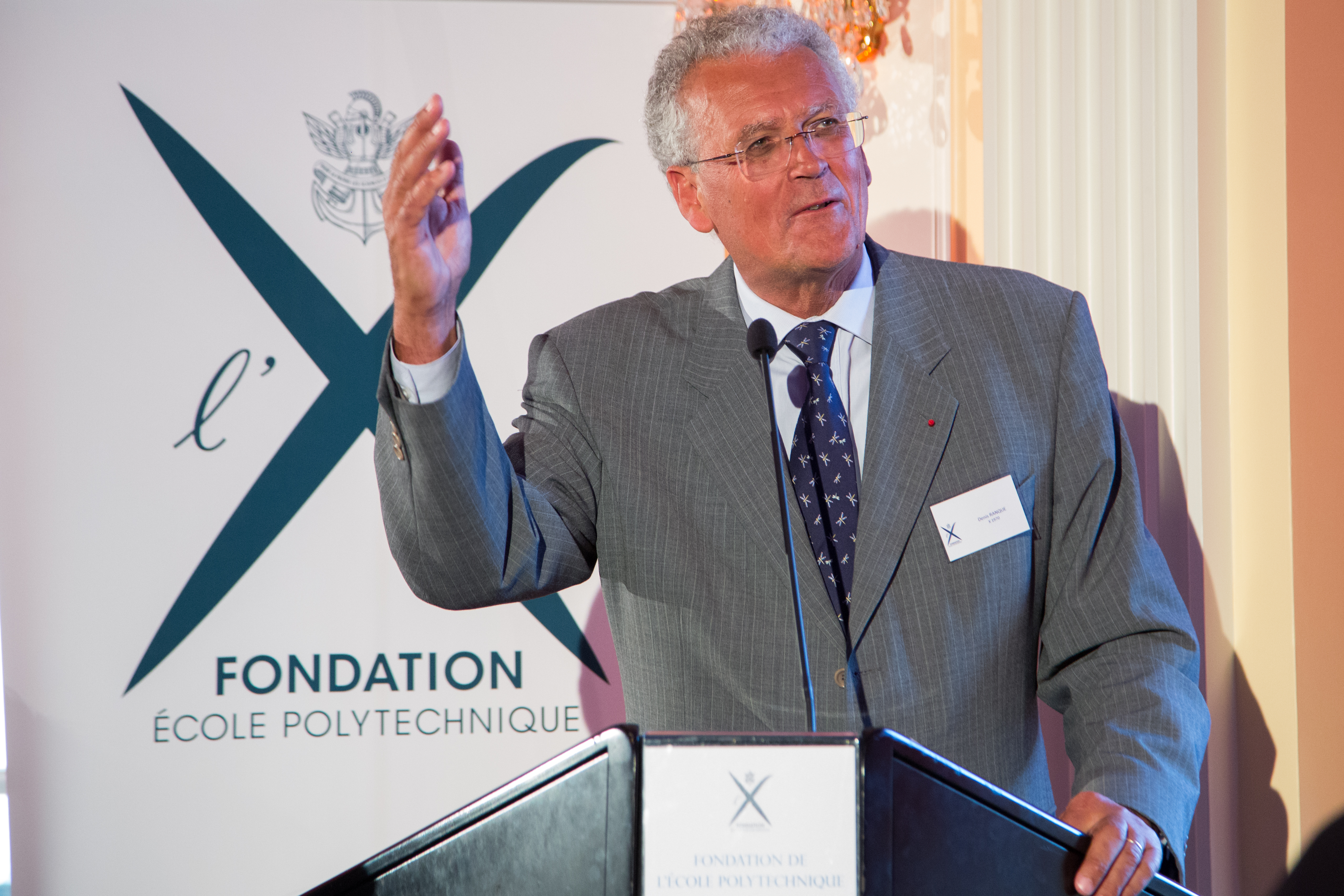
- Ranque in 2015
- Born: 7 January 1952 (age 74); Marseille, France
- Education: École Polytechnique; Mines ParisTech
- Occupation: Businessman

Denis Ranque (born 7 January 1952) is a French engineer and businessman who was CEO and chairman of Thales Group from 1998 until 2009.

== Career ==
In 1976, Ranque began his career as an engineer of the Corps des mines at the Ministry of Industry where he held various positions in the field of energy until 1983. He then joined the Thomson-CSF as "directeur du Plan" for one year. In 1984, he was appointed director of space affairs for the "Tubes électroniques" division. In 1986, he was appointed director of the "Tubes hyperfréquences" department, which was spun off in 1988 as Thomson Tubes Electroniques (TTE), a company of which he was chairman and CEO from 1989 to 1992. In April 1992, Denis Ranque was appointed chairman and CEO of Thomson-Sintra Activitiés sous-marines (Thomson Sintra ASM). Four years later, he was appointed by Thomson-CSF and GEC-Marconi as CEO of the joint company they created in the field of sonar systems, Thomson Marconi Sonar. He resigned from his position as chief mining engineer in 1996. In 1998, Ranque was appointed chairman and chief executive officer of Thomson-CSF, rebranded Thales in 2000. In 2008, his total salary, including bonuses and options, was €1.8 million. By 2009, he met increased pressure to step down after his opposition to Dassault Aviation becoming the company's core industrial shareholder. He resigned from Thales in May 2009.

In 2013, EADS appointed Ranque as its next chairman under a new shareholder structure, replacing Arnaud Lagardère. The French government had initially backed Anne Lauvergeon for the role but EADS insisted on picking one of the board's independent majority in an effort to curb political influence from France and Germany.

At the end of 2021 he was elected President of the French Academy of Technologies (FNAT), effective 1 January 2022. Also, he is the President of the International Council of Academies of Engineering and Technological Sciences (CAETS) Board of Directors in 2022 year.

== Other activities ==
=== Corporate boards ===
- Airbus, chairman of the board of directors (2013-2019)
- CMA CGM, independent member of the board of directors
- Saint-Gobain, independent member of the board of directors (since 2003)
- Scilab Enterprises, independent member of the board of directors (−2017)
- Bpifrance, independent member of the board of directors (2011–2012)
- Technicolor, non-executive chairman of the board of directors (2010–2012)

=== Non-profit organizations ===
- French Academy of Technologies, the National Academy of Technologies and Engineering of France, President since 1 January 2022.
- La Fabrique de l'Industrie, co-chairman (2014–2017)
- Cercle de l'industrie, chairman (2002–2012)
