= International Signal and Control =

American defense contractor

International Signal and Control (ISC) was a U.S. defense contractor based in Lancaster, Pennsylvania, that was involved in the manufacture of electronic missile subassemblies, navigation components, fuses, power supplies for proximity fuzes, and grenade technology.

By the 1980s, ISC's business primarily consisted of illegal arms sales started at the behest of various US clandestine organizations. On paper the company looked to be extremely profitable on sales of high-priced legitimate items, but in fact these profits were essentially non-existent. After the sale of the company to Ferranti in 1987, all illegal sales ended immediately, leaving the company with no obvious cash flow, and the merger led to the ultimate collapse of Ferranti in 1991.

ISC was involved in two major crimes, for which CEO James Guerin received a 15-year prison sentence:

- It defrauded and caused the collapse of the British company Ferranti, which acquired it in 1987.
- It exported classified military technology to South Africa, which was then forwarded to third countries, notably Iraq.

== Operations ==
Originally called ESI (Electronic Systems International), the company manufactured sub-assemblies for the AGM-45 Shrike and RIM-7 Sea Sparrow missiles in 1974, and just after the Vietnam War which was part of a standard arms contract for the US defense administration (DCAS). The company also had a commercial repair facility of two meter portable amateur ("ham") radios from a company in New Jersey called Clegg, and manufactured communications helmet radios for firemen, and electronic outdoor bug zappers.

== Exports to South Africa and Iraq ==
In 1974, with the knowledge and assistance of US agencies, advanced radar-controlled anti-aircraft systems were shipped to South Africa. South Africa, together with ISC, also developed a sophisticated ground-to-air missile for its own use and for export. All this equipment was restricted US technology requiring export licenses, which were not obtained. James Guerin claimed the company's activities were sanctioned by the US government. Guerin set up a front company with the South African authorities for the US National Security Agency, as part of a US covert operation in 1974. This involved shipping advanced electronic sensors, optics and related equipment to South Africa without licenses so as to set up listening posts to track Soviet submarines off the Cape of Good Hope. The company, Gamma Systems Associates, ordered restricted equipment from ISC, then shipped it on to South Africa on board airliners. The equipment was repackaged and the airline companies given false descriptions of the equipment. The operation ceased to have official sanction in 1977 and the activities were dismantled.

From 1984 to 1988, ISC sent South Africa more than $30 million in military-related equipment, including telemetry tracking antennae to collect data from missiles in flight, gyroscopes for guidance systems, and photo-imaging film readers, all of which would form the "backbone" of a medium-range missile system. Some of this technology was reportedly transferred to Iraq. Another link to Iraq was the supply of the specifications for the Mk 20 Rockeye II cluster bomb through Chilean defense company Cardoen Industries, which was able to build an almost identical weapon that was subsequently used against coalition forces in the Persian Gulf War of January–February 1991.

These activities allegedly happened with the knowledge and assistance of U.S. intelligence agencies (including the CIA) and in violation of United States and United Nations sanctions.

== Acquisition and collapse ==
ISC was acquired by Ferranti in November 1987. This merger caused the collapse of Ferranti due to the debts of its new subsidiary. Ferranti was eventually broken up and the majority of the defense subsidiaries were purchased by GEC. On October 31, 1991, ISC founder James Guerin (1930-2022), and 18 others were indicted by a Philadelphia Federal Grand Jury on charges of a "$1.14 Billion Fraud (Ferranti/ISC Merger of November, 1987)" and the illegal sales of arms to South Africa and Iraq. On December 5, 1991, Guerin pleaded guilty to eight charges including: conspiracy to inflate the accounts of ISC by means of non-existent international contract supported by false paperwork and circular cash transfers; conspiracy to defraud Ferranti shareholders and investors (at the time of merger with ISC in 1987); obtaining finance on fraudulently inflated share values when ISC plc was floated on the London Stock Exchange in 1982, and money laundering between US, UK and Swiss banks. He was sentenced to a 15-year prison term and served 13 years.

In 1994, after Bobby Ray Inman requested to be withdrawn from consideration as Bill Clinton's replacement for Defense Secretary Les Aspin, his critics speculated that the decision was motivated by a desire to conceal his links to ISC. Inman was a member of the board of directors of the company, which was allegedly either negligent or approved the exports.
