= Thomson-CSF =

Electronics and defence contractor

- Type: Société Anonyme
- Industry: Aerospace; Defence; Electronics
- Founded: 1968; 58 years ago
- Defunct: 2000; 26 years ago
- Successor: Thales Group
- Headquarters: La Défense, France
- Area served: Worldwide
- Products: Avionics, radios, radars and more
- Website: www.thomson-csf.com

Thomson-CSF was a French company that specialized in the development and manufacture of electronics with a heavy focus upon the aerospace and defence sectors of the market.

Thomson-CSF was formed in 1968 following the merger of Thomson-Houston-Hotchkiss-Brandt (itself a merger between Thomson-Houston and Hotchkiss-Brandt) with the Compagnie Générale de Télégraphie Sans Fil (General Wireless Telegraphy Company, commonly abbreviated as CSF), these two companies being the source of the name Thomson-CSF. It operated as an electronics specialist on products such as broadcasting equipment, electroacoustics, shortwave radio sets, radar systems and television. During the 1970s, it began manufacturing backend telephony equipment, semiconductors and medical imaging apparatus. It also entered into large deals outside of the domestic market, acquiring considerable business in the Middle East.

During the late 1980s, Thomson-CSF, anticipating defence spending cutbacks, conducted a radical business restructuring, merging its semiconductor interests with those of the Italian defence group Finmeccanica and exchanging its medical imaging technology for General Electric's consumer electronics businesses. In the latter decades of operation, it built itself into a multinational corporation. During 1989, it acquired Philips' defence electronics business, Hollandse Signaalapparaten B.V. In 1999, the company was privatised, but not before divesting its consumer electronics businesses. Shortly after, it took over the British defence electronics company Racal Electronics.

In December 2000, Thomson-CSF was rebranded Thales Group.

== History ==
Thomson-CSF traces its origins to the formation of the American business Thomson-Houston Electric Company by Elihu Thomson and Edwin Houston in 1879. On 15 April 1892, the Thomson-Houston Electric Company merged with its rival, the Edison General Electric Company, to form General Electric (GE). That same year, the company formed an overseas subsidiary, named Thomson Houston International, based in France. In 1893, Compagnie Française Thomson-Houston (CFTH) was established as a partner to GE. CFTH's operations centered around the application of GE's patents in the growing electricity generation and transmission industry. The modern Thomson companies evolved from this company.

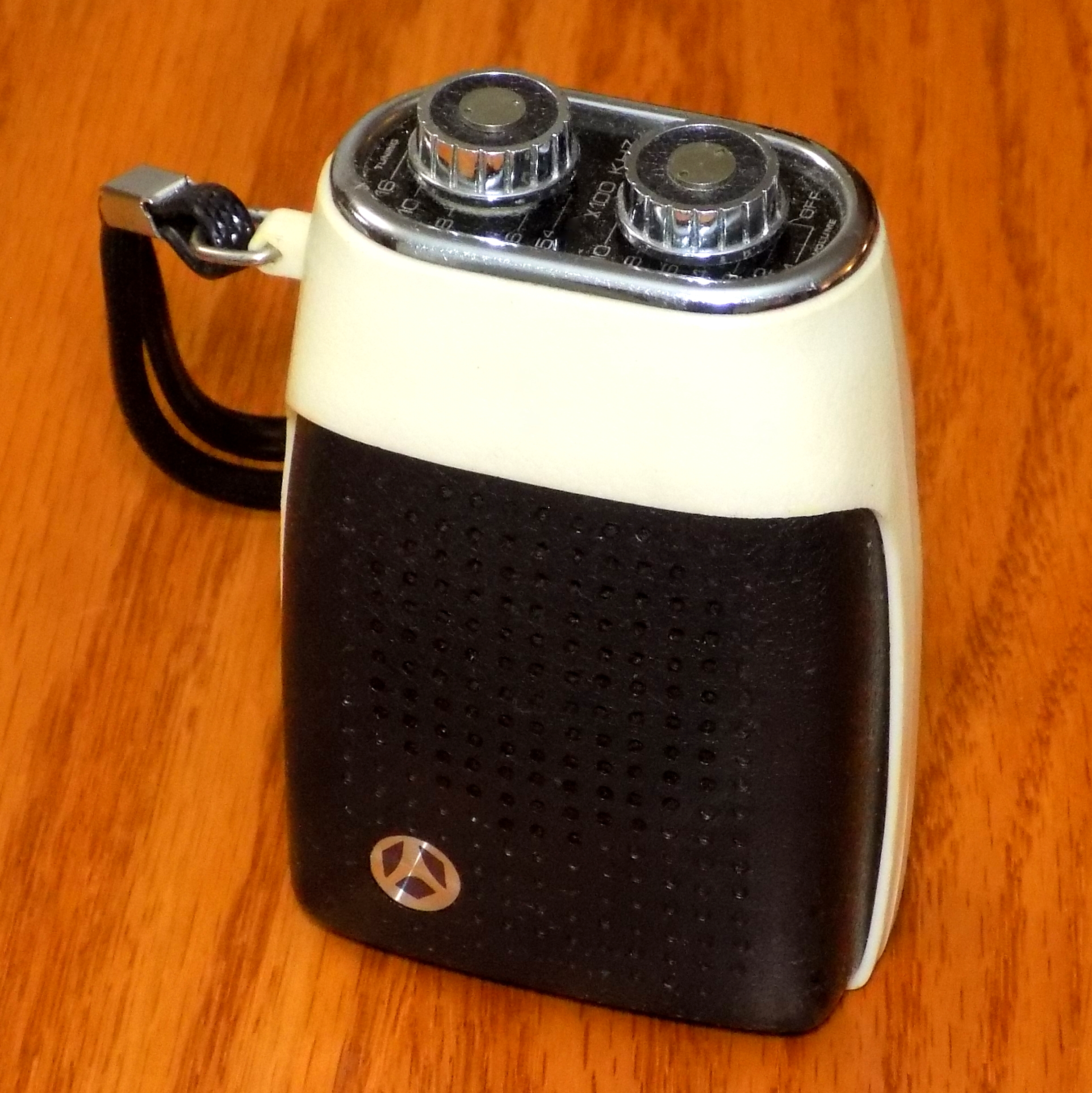
Thomson-CSF pocket radio (1972)

In 1966, CFTH merged with armaments and vehicle manufacturer Hotchkiss-Brandt to form Thomson-Houston-Hotchkiss-Brandt, which was subsequently renamed Thomson-Brandt. Two years later, the electronics business of Thomson-Brandt merged with Compagnie Générale de Télégraphie Sans Fil (General Wireless Telegraphy Company, commonly abbreviated as CSF) to form Thomson-CSF. Prior to the merger, CSF had operated as a pioneer in the fields of broadcasting, electroacoustics, shortwave radio, radar systems and television. Thomson Brandt maintained a significant shareholding in the merged company (approximately 40 percent).

In the 1970s, Thomson-CSF received its first major contract in the Middle Eastern market. In this period the company diversified into several new sectors, leading to it manufacturing backend telephony equipment, semiconductors and medical imaging apparatus. By the early 1980s, Thomson-CSF was in a weak financial position and carrying a high level of debt. While it possessed a diversified portfolio of businesses, its market share within the majority of these many sectors was viewed as being too small to be realistically profitable despite increasing business from overseas buyers.

In 1982, both Thomson-Brandt and Thomson-CSF were nationalised by France's Mitterrand government. As a consequence, Thomson-Brandt was renamed Thomson SA (Société Anonyme) and merged with Thomson-CSF. Throughout the 1980s, the company's financial position improved dramatically as undertook a major reorganisation, focusing its efforts on the production of electronics for professional and defence customers.

In 1983, the company divested Thomson-CSF Téléphone, its civil telecommunications division, to the French telecommunications specialist Alcatel. Four years later, its semiconductor interests were merged with those of the Italian defence group Finmeccanica, resulting in the creation of STMicroelectronics. That same year, Thomson-CSF's medical imaging technology was exchanged with GE for GE's RCA and consumer electronics businesses.

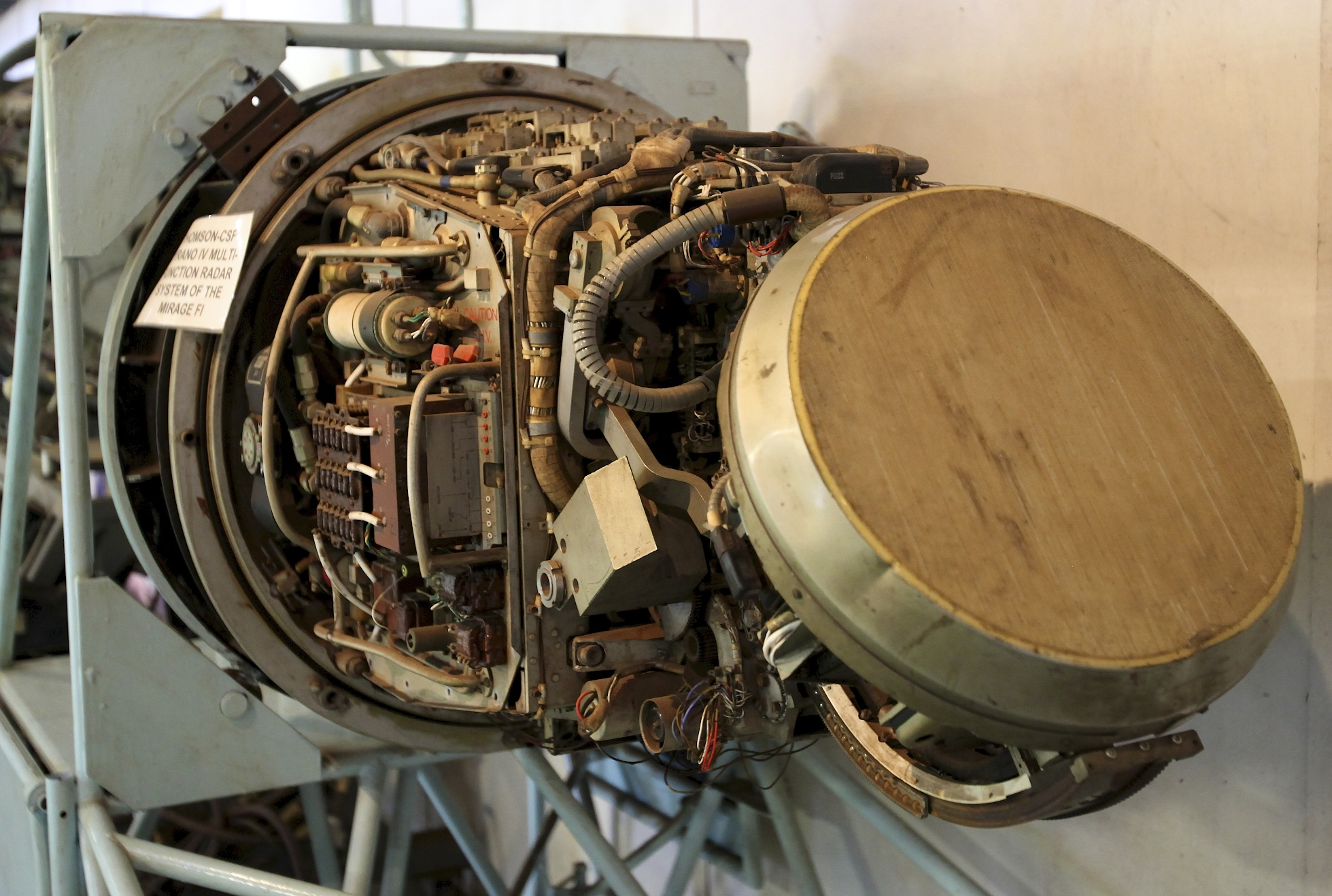
Thomson-CSF Cyrano IV airborne radar as used on the Dassault Mirage F1

In the late 1980s, Thomson-CSF, anticipating future defence spending cutbacks and a downturn in its lucrative export contracts, initiated a restructuring of its businesses with the aim of maintaining its margins. A policy of proactive external growth was adopted, focusing on the European market. Between 1976 and 1987, the company's non-French subsidiaries' share of consolidated revenues rose from 5 percent to 25 percent. In 1988, a new division, Thomson Consumer Electronics was formed; this division was rebranded as Thomson Multimedia in 1995. In 1989, it acquired Philips' defence electronics business, Hollandse Signaalapparaten B.V. During the 1990s, Thomson-CSF gained a controlling interest in Sextant Avionique, which was formed by the merger of the company's avionics business with that of French aircraft manufacturer Aérospatiale. The company also divested its interests in the French bank Crédit Lyonnais and semiconductor manufacturer SGSThomson.

During the late 1990s, French Prime Minister Lionel Jospin's Plural Left government initiated a policy of privatisation of several state-owned companies, including Thomson-CSF. In April 1998, several of the affected companies, including Aérospatiale, Alcatel, Dassault Industries, Thomson-CSF and Thomson SA reached a cooperation agreement that was endorsed by the French government. Several of these terms brought about several major changes to Thomson-CSF as well as several other entities. Principally, the professional and defence electronics businesses of Alcatel and Dassault Électronique were merged with Thomson-CSF. Additionally, the satellite businesses of Alcatel, Aerospatiale and Thomson-CSF were merged to form a new entity, Alcatel Space, which was jointly owned by Alcatel and Thomson-CSF.

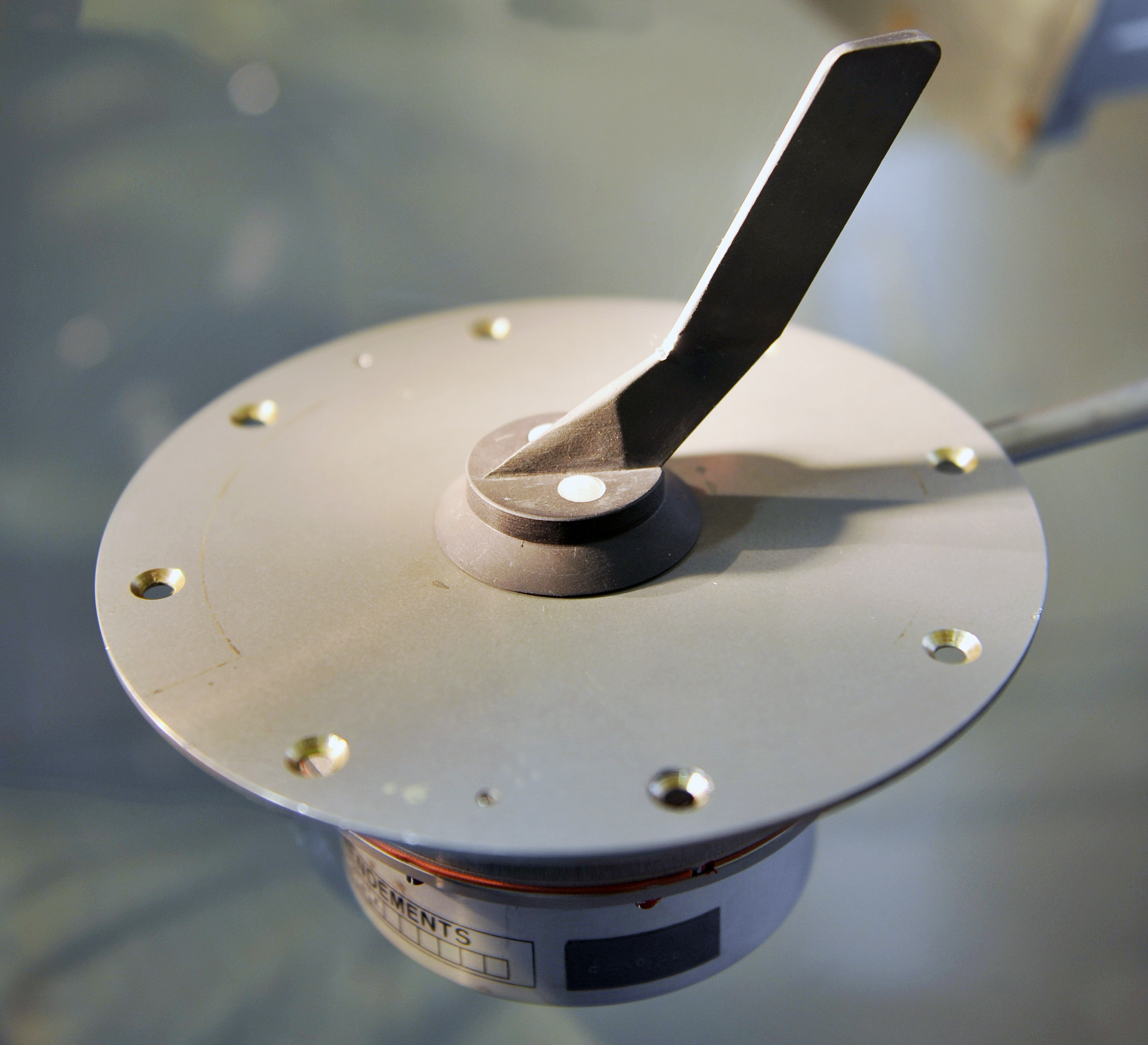
Commercial aircraft Angle of Attack Sensor, made by Thomson-CSF

By June 1998, implementation of the finalised agreement had commenced. The majority of Thomson-CSF's capital was transferred into private ownership. The French State reduced its holding in the company from 58% to 40%. At the time, Thomson-CSF's principal private shareholders were Alcatel and Dassault Industries. The division of the company's consumer electronics and defence businesses prior to privatisation brought about the creation of Thomson Multimedia, which was a distinct entity from Thomson-CSF. During late 1996, it was announced that Thomson Multimedia would be acquired by the South Korean conglomerate Daewoo, however, this arrangement quickly became a controversial matter over alleged irregularities and thus did not ultimately come to pass. In the aftermath of this controversy, Thomson Multimedia became an independent operation and was rebranded as Technicolor SA.

Following its privatisation, Thomson-CSF continued to orient itself toward the defence electronics sector, establishing itself in overseas nations, including South Africa, Australia, South Korea and Singapore. In October 1999, Samsung Electronics announced the creation of a 50-50 joint venture with Thomson-CSF. This joint venture, based in South Korea, would be led by a CEO appointed by Samsung Electronics and will take over the entire defense business that had been operated by Samsung Electronics, which employed 697 people and generated sales of KRW 163.1 billion (US$134.5 million) the previous year. The new company would market Samsung Electronics' defense communication equipment, satellite communication systems and terminals, fire control systems, radar guidance equipment including detection and tracking devices, and gunner's sights; and would begin overseas exports through Thomson's sales network. At the time, Samsung stated that the two parent companies also intended to combine their respective areas of competitive advantage to jointly develop and sell next-generation products.

In March 1998, the Taiwan frigate scandal broke when the former French foreign minister Roland Dumas alleged that a US$500 million commission was paid by Thomson-CSF (now Thales) to French and Taiwanese officials, to facilitate the $3 billion sale of six La Fayette-class frigates to the Taiwanese Navy in 1991. This led to the Taiwanese Navy suing Thomson-CSF (Thales) to recover an alleged $590 million in kickbacks, paid to French and Taiwanese officials as bribes to facilitate the La Fayette deal, as Taiwan had allegedly been reluctant to purchase the frigates.

During the mid 1990s, Thomson-CSF began exploring the possibility of merging with British defence specialist Marconi Electronic Systems; however, its ambitions were ultimately foiled by the success of a rival bid by the defence and aerospace firm British Aerospace, which rebranded itself as BAE Systems shortly thereafter. Remaining keen to expand its defence and technology business, during January 2000, Thomson-CSF announced the acquisition of the British defence electronics company Racal Electronics, which it purchased for £1.3 billion. As a result of its takeover of Racal, the UK became Thomson-CSF's second-largest domestic industrial base after France. Racal was initially rebranded Thomson-CSF Racal plc.

Shortly after the Racal acquisition, Thomson-CSF conducted a strategic review of its portfolio of businesses. It adopted a new organisational structure comprising three business areas: defence, aerospace and information technology. Management decided that the company ought to leverage its dual-purpose technology, marketing itself at particular civil markets that held strong parallels with its established defence and aerospace competencies, such as mobile telecommunications. Meanwhile, non-strategic assets were divested. Thomson-CSF also explored business opportunities further afield. In December 2000, it was announced that the company was forming a joint venture with the American defence company Raytheon. This arrangement was claimed to be first transatlantic joint venture in the defence sector.

In December 2000, Thomson-CSF was officially rebranded as Thales (from the Greek philosopher Thales, pronounced [talɛs] reflecting its pronunciation in French).

== Presidents ==
From 1969 to December 6, 2000, the Thomson-CSF board of directors had six presidents.

#	Name	Period
1	Paul Richard	1969 – 7 June 1976
2	Michel Walhain	7 June 1976 – 25 June 1981
3	Jean-Pierre Bouyssonnie	25 June 1981 - 17 February 1982
4	Alain Gomez	17 February 1982 - 21 February 1996
5	Marcel Roulet	21 February 1996 - 20 January 1998
6	Denis Ranque	20 January 1998 - 6 December 2000

== See also ==
- Vantiva, which Thomson-CSF was a part of, when Vantiva was known as the Thomson Group, then Thomson Multimedia
- STMicroelectronics, formed by the merger of Thomson-CSF's semiconductor business (Thomson Semiconducteurs) with an Italian semiconductor company
