= Geoffrey Gaut =

Geoffrey Gaut CBE
- Born: 12 October 1909; Penwortham, Lancashire
- Died: 18 August 1992 (aged 82)
- Education: Royal Grammar School Worcester; University College, Oxford
- Known for: Scientist in Britain's early semiconductor industry
- Scientific career
- Fields: Semiconductors
- Workplaces: Plessey

Geoffrey Charles Gaut CBE (12 October 1909 – 18 August 1992) was a scientist in Britain's early semiconductor industry.

== Early life ==
Gaut was born in Penwortham, Lancashire.

He was educated at the Royal Grammar School Worcester. He went to University College, Oxford, gaining a degree in Chemistry. He remained at Oxford and researched colloidal materials. During six years at Oxford, he was a member of the Oxford University Air Squadron, where he learned to master aerobatics.

== Career ==
=== Plessey ===
He joined Plessey in 1934, as the second graduate employee at the company, earning £6 a week, and rose to Chief Chemist. By the start of World War II, he was in charge of all the company's research and development. He volunteered to join the RAF, passed the necessary tests, and was commissioned as an officer. When Allen Clark, of Plessey, was told of this, he coerced the RAF to stop Gaut's commission. Gaut would later work with Allen's brother, John Clark. He would later qualify as a helicopter pilot aged 58.

He set up a new research laboratory at Caswell House in Northamptonshire, which became the Caswell Research Laboratories. He became the Director of the site, followed later by Derek Roberts. In 1948 the researchers invented radar absorbent material. Britain's first research into solid-state silicon devices was begun in 1952, and in the late 1960s Gunn diodes were developed.

On 8 January 1963, he joined Plessey's board of directors as Director of Research, becoming Director of Technology in 1969. He retired in 1985.

=== British research ===
He was a board member of the National Research Development Corporation (NRDC) for many years from April 1966.

== Personal life ==
He married in 1937 and had a son and daughter. He was appointed CBE in the 1973 New Year Honours. He was an organist and pianist.
