= Caswell, Northamptonshire =

Coordinates: 52.1544°N 1.0491°W

Caswell
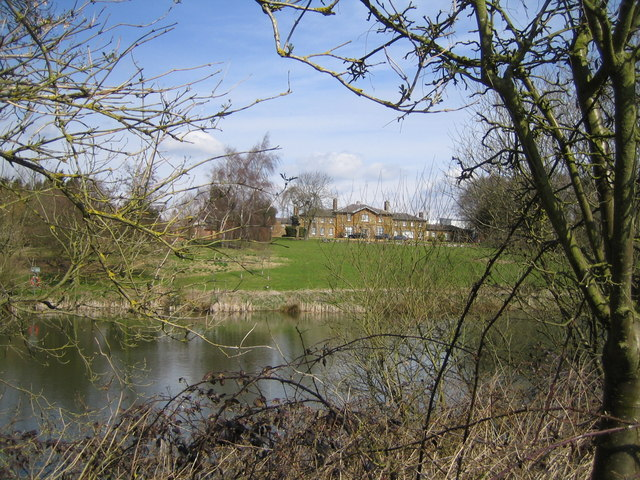
- Allen Clark Research Centre seen from across the lake

- Location within Northamptonshire
- OS grid reference: SP651511
  - London: 65 miles (105 km) SE
- Civil parish: Greens Norton
- Unitary authority: West Northamptonshire
- Ceremonial county: Northamptonshire
- Region: East Midlands
- Country: England
- Sovereign state: United Kingdom
- Post town: TOWCESTER
- Postcode district: NN12
- Dialling code: 01327
- Police: Northamptonshire
- Fire: Northamptonshire
- Ambulance: East Midlands
- UK Parliament: South Northamptonshire

Caswell is a lost settlement within Greens Norton civil parish in West Northamptonshire, England, approximately 3 miles (5 km) north-west of Towcester, 8 miles (13 km) south-west of Northampton and 12 miles (19 km) north-west of Milton Keynes. It consists almost entirely of Caswell Park science and technology park, which has developed since the 1940s around a 19th-century farmhouse.

== Caswell House ==
The farmhouse was built for the Duke of Grafton's estate around 1840, at the same time as another at Field Burcote, about a mile to the west. Both have three widely spaced bays with low-pitched hipped slate roofs and lower wings, and are formally arranged. At Caswell, the building and its single-storey outbuildings, although much altered in the 20th century, are Grade II listed.

== Research establishment ==
=== Foundation ===
The concept of a research lab covering the Plessey company's interests in materials germinated in 1934 when its founders Allen George Clark and William O. Heyne were in charge. Another leading member of staff at this time was Geoffrey Gaut, who joined the Plessey company from Oxford University where he was awarded a degree in chemistry. He joined as Chief Chemist at Ilford where he began a lifelong involvement with electronic materials and devices. At the beginning of the Second World War in 1939 he volunteered for the RAF, having qualified as a pilot with the University Air Squadron at Oxford. However, to his chagrin, his commission was cancelled through the influence of Allen Clark who believed that Gaut would have a special role to play in the war effort to develop electronics and radar.

=== 1940s and 50s ===
With bombing in the Ilford area in 1940, Gaut was told to relocate his laboratory in a quieter country environment where research could proceed undisturbed. Thus was founded Plessey's laboratory at Caswell, which, as Gaut said, also kept his young scientific team concentrating and well away from any interference by senior management. The company bought the entire farm in 1945, and for a time the farmhouse was the Gaut family home.

By 1950, the number of research staff at Plessey Research Caswell had reached 50. The distance between Ilford and Caswell prompted the introduction of local pre-production units, and over the next 20 years or so this led to the establishment of at least a further eight independent businesses locally in the Towcester area, especially around Wood Burcote, just south of the town.

=== 1960s to 1990s ===
For the next 50 or so years, the site became the home of the Allen Clark Research Centre. The centre was formally opened under Clark's name (Clark had died in 1962) by the Prince Philip, Duke of Edinburgh on 20 March 1964 when the Duke unveiled a plaque by Scottish sculptor David McFall.

Plessey sold some 207 acres of the farm's land in 1968, retaining 23 acres.

Research was carried out in a number of areas including semiconductors, LED's, other solid-state devices and integrated circuits (ICs). Caswell was the birthplace of self scanned C-MOS light sensor arrays (PJW Noble) for their company Plessey Semiconductors (also known for a time as Plessey Microelectronics) based at Cheney Manor, Swindon. The site had a scanning electron microscope, used to examine the surface topology of ICs under static and charged conditions. At peak, the centre employed several hundred people. After the 1989 GEC/Siemens takeover of Plessey, the Caswell site was taken over by GEC and subsequently GEC Marconi. Marconi's difficulties led to the sale of the site to Bookham Technology in 2002.

=== Caswell's devices ===
The gallium arsenide field effect transistor and monolithic microwave integrated circuit (MMIC) were invented and developed at Caswell, and scientists on the site were working on silicon integrated circuit technology almost 18 months before Jack Kilby demonstrated the first working IC at Texas Instruments in Dallas. Caswell technologists also developed the first multilayer ceramic capacitor and a host of other inventions that enabled many of the electronic products we rely on today – including mobile phones, satellite TV and WiFi.

=== 21st century ===
In 2009 a campus-style business park opened on the site, with the potential to employ up to 500, to be known as Caswell Science Park. It is operated by regional technology parks operator Fasset, which is marketing and letting vacant space for on-site client Lumentum. Fasset's client was previously known as Oclaro, a multinational company specialising in optical components for telecommunications and the internet, before the company was bought out by Lumentum in 2018. The site has an area of 22 acres (8.9 ha) with 170,000 sq ft (16,000 m^{2}) mixed-used office, manufacturing and laboratory space, with 160 people working for 10 companies at the time of opening. Occupiers in 2009 included Diamond Hard Surfaces, IT Systems UK, Solutions Research, Nemisys, Definition Media and Finch Business Solutions.
