= Roke (disambiguation) =

Roke is a hamlet in South Oxfordshire, England.

ROKE or Roke may also refer to:

- Röke, a locality in Skåne County, Sweden
- Review of Keynesian Economics
- Roke Knoll, a fictional location in the Earthsea universe
- Roke Manor, in Hampshire, England
  - Roke Manor Research
- Sylvie Roke (born 1977), Dutch chemist and physicist
- Typhoon Roke, several storms
