= Automatic Telephone Manufacturing Company =

Automatic Telephone and Electric Company
- Industry: telecommunication
- Founded: November 1911
- Headquarters: Liverpool, England
- Area served: United Kingdom
- Key people: Alexander Roger

The Automatic Telephone and Electric Company (originally the Automatic Telephone Manufacturing Company (ATM)) was a British telephone exchange manufacturer established in 1911. After several name changes and acquisitions, the company was merged into Plessey in 1961.

== History ==
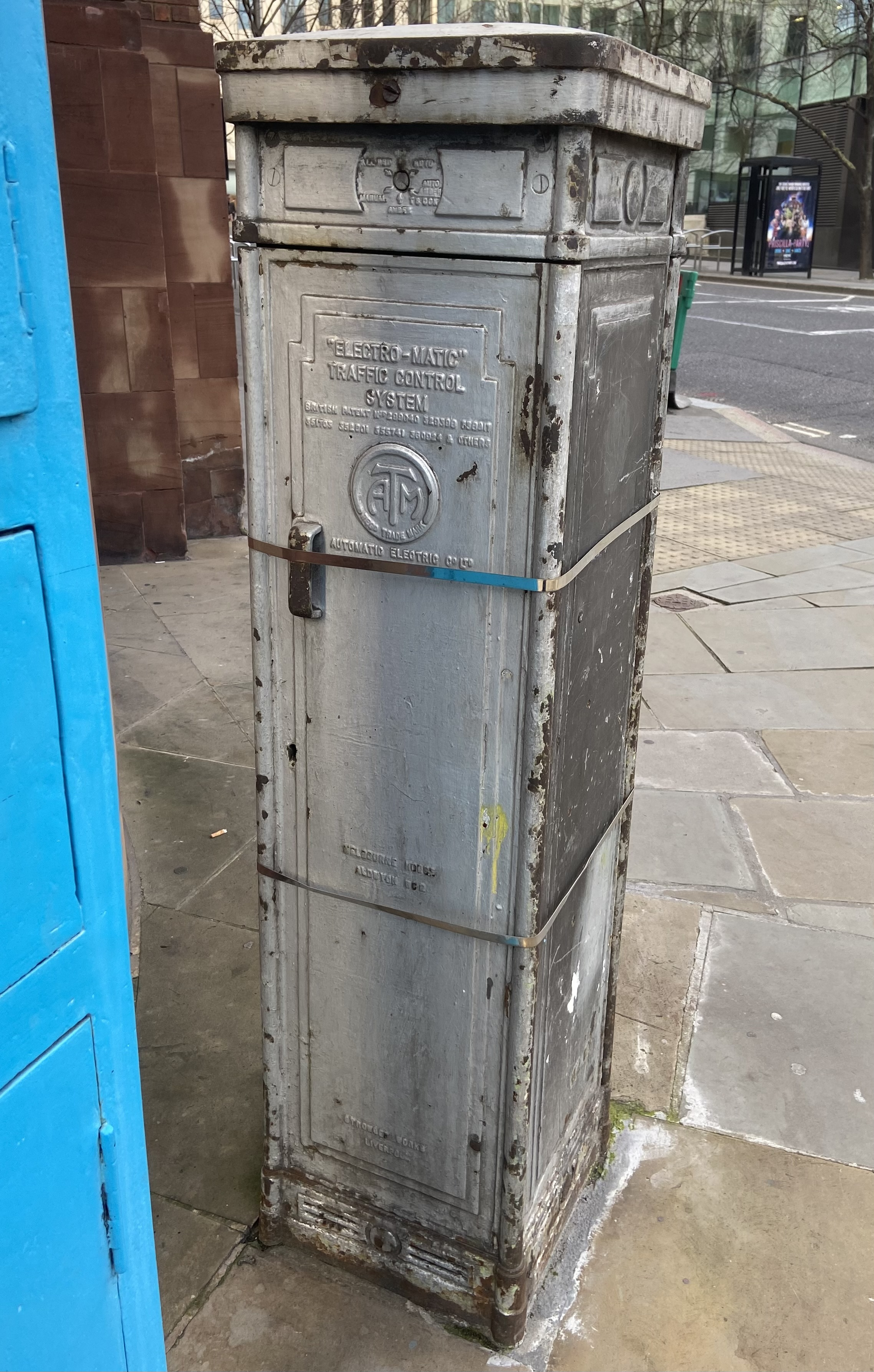
"Electro-Matic" Traffic Control System manufactured by the Automatic Electric Company. This preserved example is located in the City of London

The company was reorganised in November 1911 by the cable manufacturer BICC, to make the Strowger system of automatic telephone exchanges (called "Step-by-Step" or SXS in Britain), under licence from the Automatic Electric Company of Chicago. The precursor company The Telegraph Manufacturing Company dated from 1884, and was based in Helsby, Cheshire. The instrument and telephone manufacturing section moved to Liverpool in 1892, with premises off Renshaw Street, and in 1908 expanded by moving to a new site at Edge Lane, a former residential area on the outskirts of Liverpool.

The British telephone system was operated at that time by a Government department, the General Post Office (GPO or BPO), which installed several makes of automatic exchanges in the 1910s, including ATE SXS exchanges at Epsom (1912), followed soon after by the Official Switch (for internal GPO use), and another at Leeds (1919). The SXS system was adopted for small and medium-sized British installations in 1923. However, the basic SXS system was not suitable for London and other large British cities; London was served by 80 local exchanges in the 1920s and would have to comprise a mixture of manual and automatic exchanges for some years. The Western Electric Company, part of the American Bell System, proposed either the panel system used in New York or the rotary system to be manufactured initially in Antwerp by the Bell Telephone Company. The first exchange was to be called BLAckfriars, to serve the densely telephoned district south and west of St Paul's Cathedral.

But the company chairman Sir Alexander Roger pointed out to the GPO Secretary Sir Evelyn Murray (a relation, and also Scottish) the dangers of this proposal, which Parliament would not sanction in a time of much unemployment in Britain, and which would also adversely affect British export potential. So the company developed the director telephone system, with the director serving the same function as the register in either of the Western Electric systems, so that the routing of the local call was independent of the number dialled. The format for London numbers was retained, i.e. the exchange name (which could be spoken or dialled using letters on the dial) followed by four digits, e.g. HOLborn 4020.

According to legend, some circuit details were worked out in the dining car on the train from Liverpool to or from conferences in London, on the backs of old envelopes or on L.M.S. menu cards. In 1922 the GPO Engineer-in-Chief Colonel Purves recommended its adoption for London, as the first cost would be lower than the panel system and the equipment was similar to exchanges already installed. The first director exchange, Holburn, (made by ATM) was cut over in London on 12 November 1927, and the system was subsequently installed in other large British cities.

Manufacture was spread over several British firms, with patents pooled; initially ATM plus Siemens, the General Electric Company (GEC) and Standard Telephones and Cables (STC), the local arm of Western Electric. Ericsson Telephones was added to the bulk supply agreement in 1927. Several design features were to be common, e.g. impulses over junction circuits were "round the loop" (ATM) rather than one conductor to earth (Siemens), although subscriber meter registration was by a "booster" battery (Siemens) as this was more reliable than an electro-polarized relay (ATM).

ATM obtained several overseas contracts for SXS exchanges, such as in 1920 for Buenos Aires, operated by the United River Plate Telephone Company. Other contracts for ATM were for several Indian cities (Amritsar, Lahore and Simla), Harbin, and Dairen (Manchuria). GEC also won overseas contracts for New Delhi (India), Jerusalem and Haifa (Palestine), and China, the Irish Free State and Siam.

The company became part of the International Automatic Telephone Co. in 1920. Its name changed to Automatic Electric Co. in 1932 and then to Automatic Telephone and Electric Co. in 1936, to reflect a product range which included sidelines ranging from Xcel heating appliances to traffic signals. It became part of Plessey in 1961.
