= John Allen Clark =

Sir John Allen Clark (14 February 1926 – 3 December 2001) was managing director of the British Plessey Company, an electronics and telecommunications group built up by his father, Allen George Clark. His career with Plessey was dominated by a battle with Arnold Weinstock of GEC for control of the company together with English Electric from the 1960s. This culminated in the late 1980s with the takeover and break-up of Plessey.

== Early life ==
Clark was born in Paddington, London and educated at Harrow School. He joined the Royal Naval Volunteer Reserve (RNVR) during the Second World War. Clark later began a business apprenticeship with Metropolitan-Vickers and the Ford Motor Company. He then spent a year with American battery and electrical manufacturer P. R. Mallory and Co Inc before joining the Plessey board in 1953.

== Career with Plessey ==
In 1957 he became general manager of Plessey Components. In 1961 Plessey acquired two large British telephone equipment companies, Ericsson Telephones Ltd. and the Automatic Telephone and Electric Company (AT&E). This doubled the size of the company. Clark was closely involved having been appointed joint managing director by his father in 1961. After Sir Allen Clark's death in 1962 the company underwent a struggle for power between Clark and his brother Michael along with some other board members, but a vote of no confidence failed. Clark took over the chairmanship of AT&E and British Ericsson, and in 1964 called in McKinsey's, the management consultancy company, to advise on reorganization. Plessey was then reorganized into product groups and in 1967 Clark was appointed deputy chairman.

In 1967 the General Electric Company (GEC) merged with Associated Electrical Industries (AEI). There was concern that Plessey might be the next target for GEC and an approach was made to English Electric's chairman Lord Nelson. However, Nelson agreed a merger with GEC and this was backed by government's Industrial Reorganisation Corporation.

In 1971 Clark succeeded Field Marshal Lord Harding as chairman of Plessey. In 1976 he became chief executive as well as chairman, keeping both roles until 1989. During the 1970s Plessey supplied half of the UK's telephone equipment. At Plessey's Caswell Research Centre in Northamptonshire, equipment for digital exchanges, known as System X, was developed. Plessey was awarded the largest part of the digital contract in competition with GEC in the late 1970s. Plessey's workforce grew to around 34,000 by 1985. In 1988, the telecommunications divisions of GEC and Plessey merged to form GEC Plessey Telecommunications (GPT) with Clark as chairman. It was, however, not a harmonious relationship, and it also came under financial criticism from shareholders.

In 1988 GEC announced a new partnership with the German electronics group Siemens to once again bid for Plessey. Clark was outmanoeuvred by Arnold Weinstock, Managing Director of GEC, and in September 1989 Clark agreed a £2 billion bid from GEC and Siemens. By then he had already announced his intention to step down as chief executive.

In the late 1990s, GEC acquired Siemens' 40% stake in GPT and, in 1999, the parent company of GPT, GEC, renamed itself Marconi.

== Personal life ==
On 29 April 1952 he married Deirdre Kathleen Waterhouse (born 1929–30) and they had one son and one daughter. The marriage was dissolved in 1962 and he married Olivia Ann Pratt (born 1942–43) on 22 May 1970. They had one daughter and twin sons. In 1971 Clark was knighted for services to exports. He died on 3 December 2001, in Barbados.

== See also ==
- Plessey
- Plessey System 250
- Plessey Code
