= The Learning Company (disambiguation) =

The Learning Company was an American educational software company founded in 1980. Its name and branding have been used by multiple other companies since its dissolution in 1995.

The Learning Company may also refer to:

- SoftKey, a Canadian shovelware company which purchased The Learning Company and assumed its name from 1995–1999
- Broderbund, an American software company whose educational software line was rebranded under the Learning Company name in 1998
- Mattel Interactive, which acquired and merged its educational software line with the Learning Company brand in 1999
- The Gores Group, which acquired the Learning Company brand in 2000

== See also ==
- The Teaching Company, a provider of college-level video courses and documentaries
