= Siemens Communications =

Communications and information business arm of Siemens

- Type: Division
- Industry: Information and communications technology
- Predecessor: Siemens & Halske Telegraph Construction Company (1847); Siemens AG (1966); Siemens Communication Systems (1978)
- Founded: 1998 (as Siemens Communications)
- Defunct: 2006
- Fate: Divided into Siemens Networks GmbH & Co. KG (2006); Siemens Enterprise Communications GmbH & Co. KG (2006)
- Successor: Siemens Enterprise Communications; Nokia Siemens Networks LLC
- Headquarters: Germany
- Owner: Siemens AG

Siemens Communications was the communications and information business arm of German industrial conglomerate Siemens AG, until 2006. It was the largest division of Siemens, and had two business units – Mobile Networks and Fixed Networks; and Enterprise.

Siemens Communications division was founded in 1998 through the amalgamation of a number of early groups / divisions of Siemens AG, the oldest of which traces back to the company 'Siemens & Halske Telegraph Construction Company' founded in 1847, and the most prominent predecessor being the 1978-founded 'Siemens Communication Systems'. On October 1, 2006, Siemens AG decided to divide Siemens Communications into two companies: 'Siemens Networks GmbH & Co. KG' and 'Siemens Enterprise Communications GmbH & Co. KG'.

The company remains extant, through a series of mergers and divisions, as Siemens Enterprise Communications – a 2008 joint venture with the Gores Group where Siemens AG hold 49% with the balance of 51% held by the American partner.

== History ==
=== Origins (1847–1978) ===
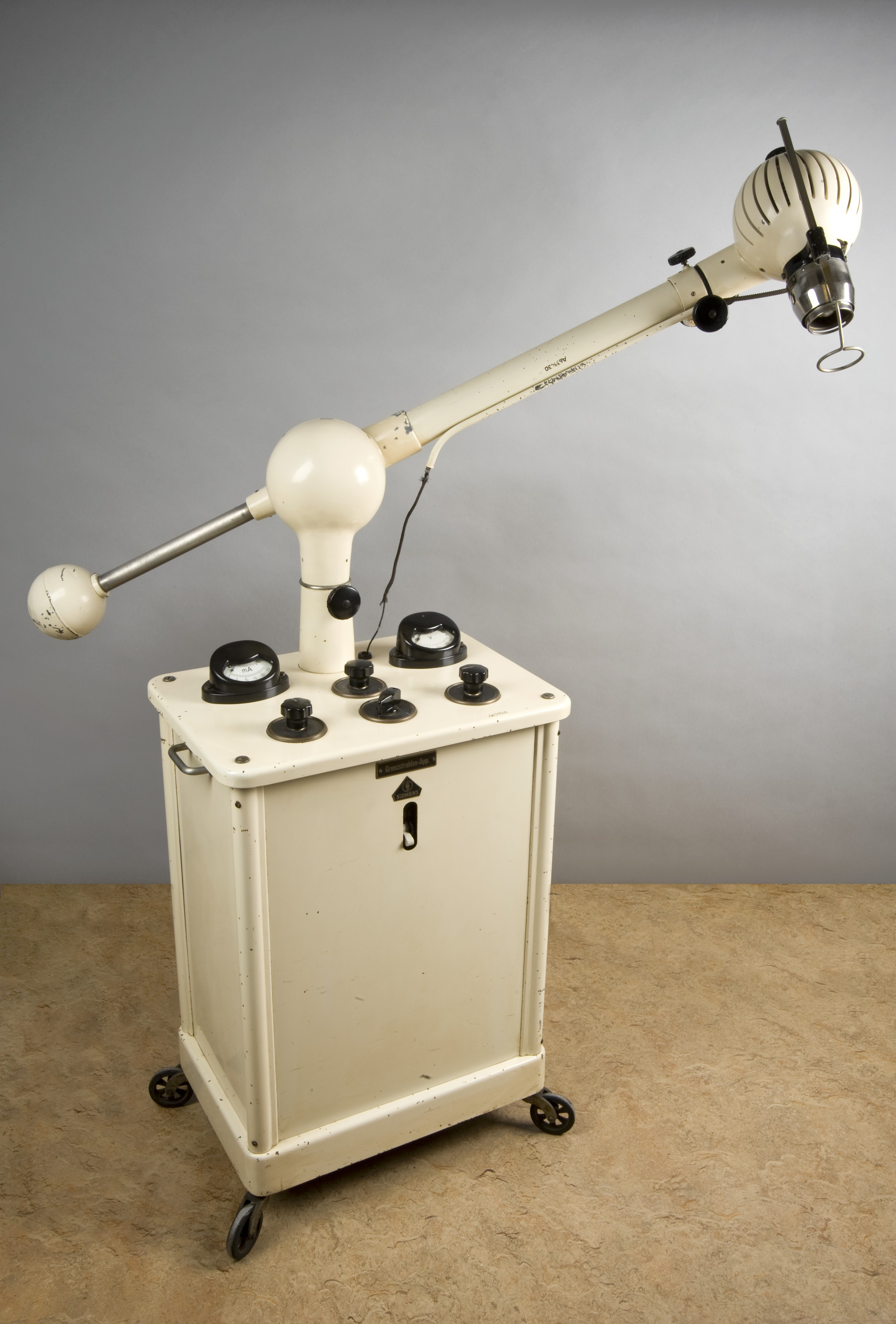
The Grenz ray machine, invented by Gustav Peter Bucky, was produced by Siemens-Reiniger.

Siemens Communications traces its origins to the company Siemens & Halske Telegraph Construction Company (German legal name: Telegraphen-Bauanstalt von Siemens & Halske) founded by Werner von Siemens on 12 October 1847. Based on the telegraph, his invention used a needle to point to the sequence of letters, instead of using Morse code.

In 1848, the company built the first long-distance telegraph line in Europe – 500 km from Berlin to Frankfurt am Main – and by the early 1850s the company was involved in building long distance telegraph networks in Russia. In 1867, Siemens completed the monumental Indo-European telegraph line stretching over 11,000 km from London to Calcutta. In 1897, Siemens & Halske went public.

During the first half of the 20th century, there were a series of mergers and divisions, which led to formation of three separate companies. First was the original company, Siemens & Halske, which focused on communications engineering; then the 1903-founded Siemens Schuckertwerke GmbH devoted to electric power engineering; finally the 1932-founded Siemens-Reiniger-Werke specializing in electro-medical equipment. In 1966, through a major restructuring process, these main companies merged to form Siemens AG.

The restructuring placed Siemens AG in a position to consolidate and diversify its operations, and be an integrated player in all domains: engineering, power generation, industry, rail systems, defence, and information & communications technology.

=== Evolution of Siemens Communications (1978–1998) ===
In 1978, the company established 'Siemens Communication Systems', which in 1985 was reorganized into two companies: 'Siemens Communication Systems' for public network products, and 'Siemens Information Systems' for PBX and computer-related products.

In the globalization era of the 1990s, Siemens Information Systems acquired Rolm Systems from IBM in 1989, which was the third largest supplier of PBX telephone switching equipment in North America. The same year, Siemens and the British-based industrial conglomerate General Electric Company plc (GEC), through their joint company GEC Siemens plc, acquired Plessey, a British-based international electronics, defence and telecommunications company founded in 1917. Most of Plessey's assets were divided between the companies; but the 1988-founded GEC-Plessey joint venture GEC-Plessey Telecommunications (GPT) was converted to a 60/40 GEC/Siemens joint venture.

In 1990, Siemens Communications Systems acquired Florida-based Stromberg-Carlson, expanding their central office switch supplier role in the public telephone network.

In 1996, Mercury Communications Ltd, subsidiary of UK-based Cable & Wireless, pulled out of the PABX market and sold that part of their business to Siemens, creating Siemens Business Communication Systems (SBCS). In October 1997, the GPT company was renamed Siemens GEC Communication Systems (SGCS), which by 1998 was merged with SBCS.

=== Siemens Communications (1998–2006) ===
In late 1998 the then CEO of Siemens AG, Heinrich von Pierer, introduced a global ten-point plan, where it would sell or spin off one-seventh of its entire domain and exit from its defence businesses. The revamped Siemens consisted of four main divisions: power generation, industry, rail systems, and information and communications. Siemens' biggest division – 'Siemens Information and Communication Networks' (SICN) – later to be commonly known as 'Siemens Communications' ('Siemens COM') – was formed on 1 October 1998 as part of major restructuring and recombining of the Siemens information and communication activities.

All of its previous communications and information technology based acquisitions were amalgamated into Siemens COM to provide products, systems, solutions, servicing and support for setting up, operating and maintaining complete corporate and carrier networks, which included ancillary services including network planning and financial consultancy. When Siemens COM was formed, it had around 60,000 employees and sales of about US$14 billion.

Siemens COM division gave greater emphasis into the U.S. market – a market dominated by Nortel Networks, Lucent Technologies, and Cisco Systems. In 1999, it acquired two Massachusetts-based private data networking companies, Castle Networks Inc and Argon Networks Inc. Further, in 2001, Siemens made its first listing on the NYSE, and adopted more transparent American-style accounting practices along with the publishing of annual results.

In March 2002, Siemens Communications combined two parts of its enterprise business – Enterprise Sales and Marketing, and Customer Service – into one unit the 'Enterprise Networks' business. Thus, Siemens Communications was divided into two major business units – one for Mobile Networks and Fixed Networks and the other for Enterprise business.

=== Division of Siemens Communications (2006–2013) ===
On 1 October 2006, Siemens AG divided Siemens Communications into two companies – Siemens Networks GmbH & Co. KG and Siemens Enterprise Communications GmbH & Co. KG – in order to pursue strategic alliances in information and communication technology (ICT).

The carrier business (mobile networks, fixed networks, carrier services) became Siemens Networks GmbH & Co. KG, which later merged with Nokia to form a joint venture Nokia Siemens Networks LLC, where Nokia Oyj held 50.1% and Siemens 49.9%. In 2013, Nokia acquired 100% of Nokia Networks, buying all of Siemens' shares. In April 2014, the NSN name was phased out as part of a rebranding process.

Siemens Enterprise Communications GmbH & Co. KG was split from the enterprise division. Two years later, in October 2008 it merged into a new entity Siemens Enterprise Communications – a joint venture between Siemens AG (49%) and the Gores Group (51%) to collaborate across wireless, fixed and enterprise networks. The venture was named Open Communications, and the IP phones it produces are called OpenStage.

The Wireless Modules business unit of Siemens Communications (which designs and manufactures GSM and 3G modules for the M2M markets) moved to Siemens' Automation & Drives division, and became a stand-alone entity known as Cinterion Wireless Modules, later acquired by Gemalto.

Realitis is a PABX telephone system built in the United Kingdom. It is now branded as Hipath DX. It is the replacement to the ISDX PABX, also built by Siemens.
