= Unify (company) =

Telecommunications company

- Founded: 1 October 2008; 18 years ago (Berlin, Germany)
- Headquarters: Munich, Germany
- Area served: Worldwide
- Products: Unified Communications and Collaboration, Voice, contact center, Small and Medium businesses, Devices and clients, Network infrastructure and security, Cloud Computing
- Services: Business services, financing, project engineering and construction
- Parent: The Gores Group (2008–16); Siemens (2008–16); Atos (2016-23); Mitel (2023–present)
- Website: www.unify.com/us/

Unify is a telecommunications company focused on enterprise unified communications. It is headquartered in Munich, Germany, and is subsidiary of Mitel since 2023. It was known as Siemens Enterprise Communications (SEN) until January 21, 2016, it was a joint venture between The Gores Group and Siemens. Originally announced July 29, 2008, SEN started operating in 2013, with Gores having a 51% stake, while Siemens had 49%. In October 2023, Mitel completed the purchase of the company.

== History ==
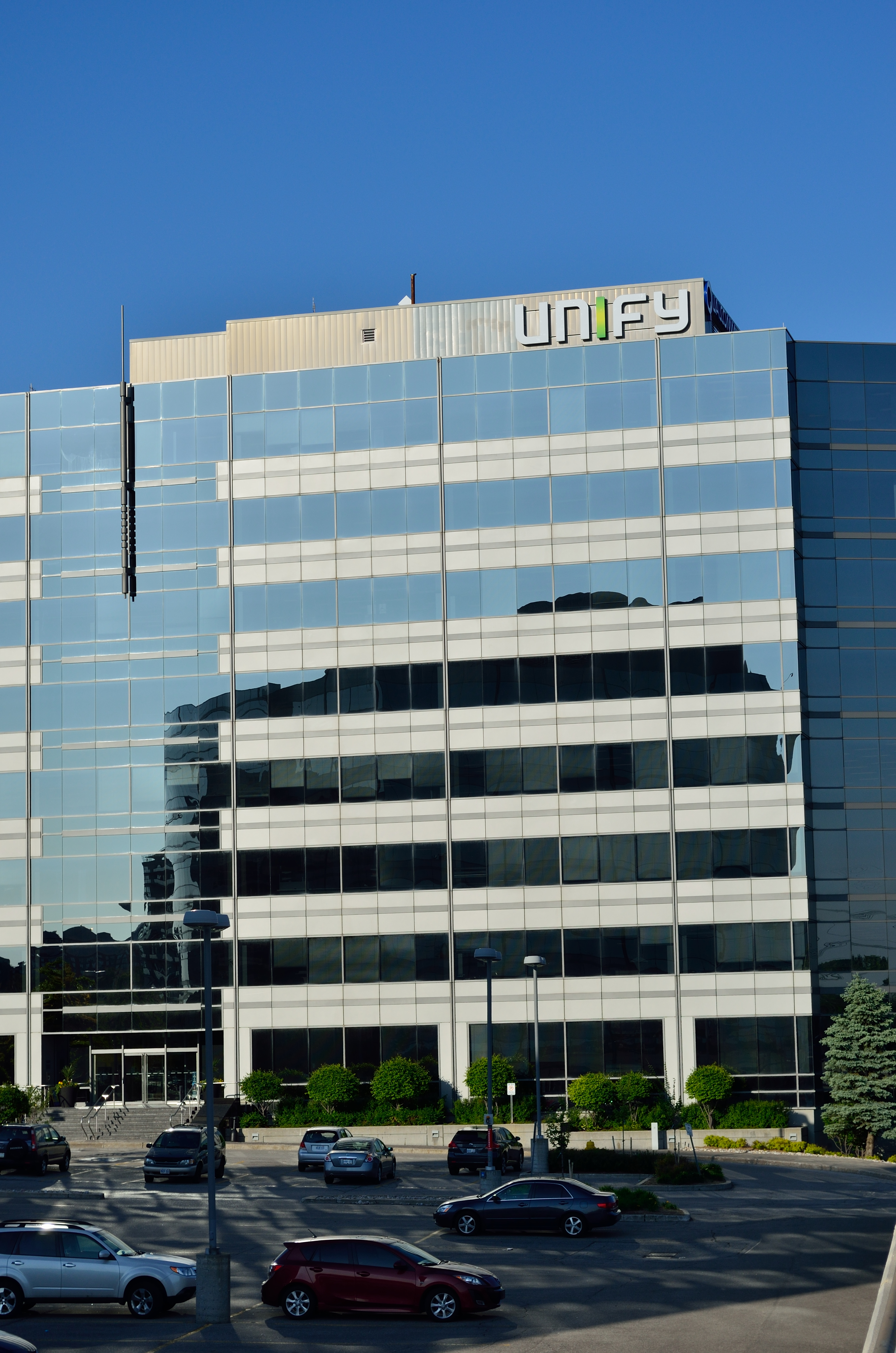
Unify office within a business park in the Thornhill district of Markham, Ontario in June 2015

=== Background: heritage (1847–2006) ===
Siemens Communications traces its origins to Siemens & Halske (German legal name: Telegraphen-Bauanstalt von Siemens & Halske), founded by Werner von Siemens on 12 October 1847. Siemens' first invention was the pointer telegraph. In the latter half of the 19th century, the company built long-distance telegraph lines, encompassing major projects in Germany and Russia, and the monumental Indo-European telegraph line stretching over 11,000 km from London to Calcutta. In 1897, Siemens & Halske went public.

During the first half of the 20th century, the company undertook a series of mergers and spin-offs, leading to the formation of three separate companies. The original company, Siemens & Halske, focused on communications engineering. Siemens-Schuckertwerke was founded in 1903 to develop electric power engineering. Finally, in 1932, Siemens-Reiniger-Werke was founded to specialize in electro-medical equipment. In 1966, through a major restructuring process, these main companies merged to form Siemens.

In the late 1970s, Siemens focused on information and communications technology (ICT). In 1978, it established Siemens Communication Systems, which, in 1985, was reorganized into two divisions: Siemens Communication Systems for public network products, and Siemens Information Systems for PBX and computer-related products. Entering the globalization era of the 1990s, these two divisions made acquisitions. In 1989, the PBX division initiated a structured purchase of ROLM from IBM, renaming it ROLM Systems, and completed the purchase in 1992 as Siemens-ROLM Communications. The same year, the company acquired a 40% stake in GEC Plessey Telecommunications (GPT) which evolved into the UK operations of the current company. In 1991, the carrier networks division acquired Stromberg-Carlson from The Plessey Company plc. In 1996, the PBX businesses of Mercury Communications, a subsidiary of UK-based Cable & Wireless, were also acquired.

In late 1998, Siemens undertook a major restructuring into four main divisions: power generation, industry, rail systems, and information and communications (ICN). As part of the ICN Division, Siemens Information & Communication Networks (SICN) – later to be commonly known as Siemens Communications (Siemens COM) – became Siemens's biggest business unit. Its focus was on Internet-based network technologies, as it was predicted that global data traffic volume would surpass voice telephony traffic in the early part of the 21st century. In addition, Siemens COM placed greater emphasis on the US market, dominated at the time by Nortel, Lucent, and the emerging Cisco; to that end, the company made two American acquisitions, Castle Networks and Argon Networks, in 1999.

In March 2002, Siemens Communications was divided into two major business units: one for public mobile networks and fixed networks, and the other for enterprise networks.

=== Siemens Enterprise Communications (2006–2013) ===
Logo when it was known as Siemens Enterprise Communications

The evolution of Siemens Enterprise Communications began in June 2006, when Siemens divided Siemens COM into two pieces. The carrier networks business was merged with Nokia's Network Business Group to form a joint venture, Nokia Siemens Networks. In October 2006, Siemens Enterprise Communications was created as a wholly owned subsidiary of Siemens. From that time, the business focused on unified communications.

In July 2008, Siemens announced a joint venture with American private equity company The Gores Group (headed by Alec Gores), integrating two Gores Group businesses, Enterasys Networks and SER Solutions. Enterasys operated as a subsidiary of Siemens Enterprise Communications until September 2013, when Extreme Networks announced an agreement to purchase Enterasys in an all-cash transaction valued at US$180 million.

=== Unify (2013–present) ===
In October 2013, Siemens Enterprise Communications was rebranded to Unify.

In November 2015 it was announced that IT services company Atos would purchase Unify from The Gores Group/Siemens for 340 million euro. The acquisition was completed in January 2016.

In January 2023, Atos announced it entered into exclusive negotiations with Mitel for the sale of its Unified Communications & Collaboration business (Unify).

Mitel filed for Chapter 11 bankruptcy protection on March 10, 2025, listing assets and liabilities between $1 billion and $10 billion. On June 20, 2025, Mitel exited bankruptcy following the completion of its restructuring plan.

== Products and services ==
Unify is a communications provider that develops, deploys, and manages unified communications, network infrastructure and security and managed and professional services for large enterprises and small and medium enterprises, both directly and via partners.

Its primary product brands are OpenScape (unified communications applications), HiPath (converged enterprise communications) and Circuit (SaaS Team Communication). The company announced OpenScape with Microsoft in 2003. Unify demonstrated SIP and service-oriented architecture with OpenScape. The company's services cover managed services, professional services, and maintenance and support services.

In 2014, Unify launched a SaaS team communication product called Circuit which was previously codenamed Project Ansible. By agreement between the new owner Atos and former owner, from 2016 Circuit was further developed on-the-go and in 2017 launched as a unified communication and collaboration platform for the whole of Siemens.
