= R1155 =

British communications receiver used during World War II

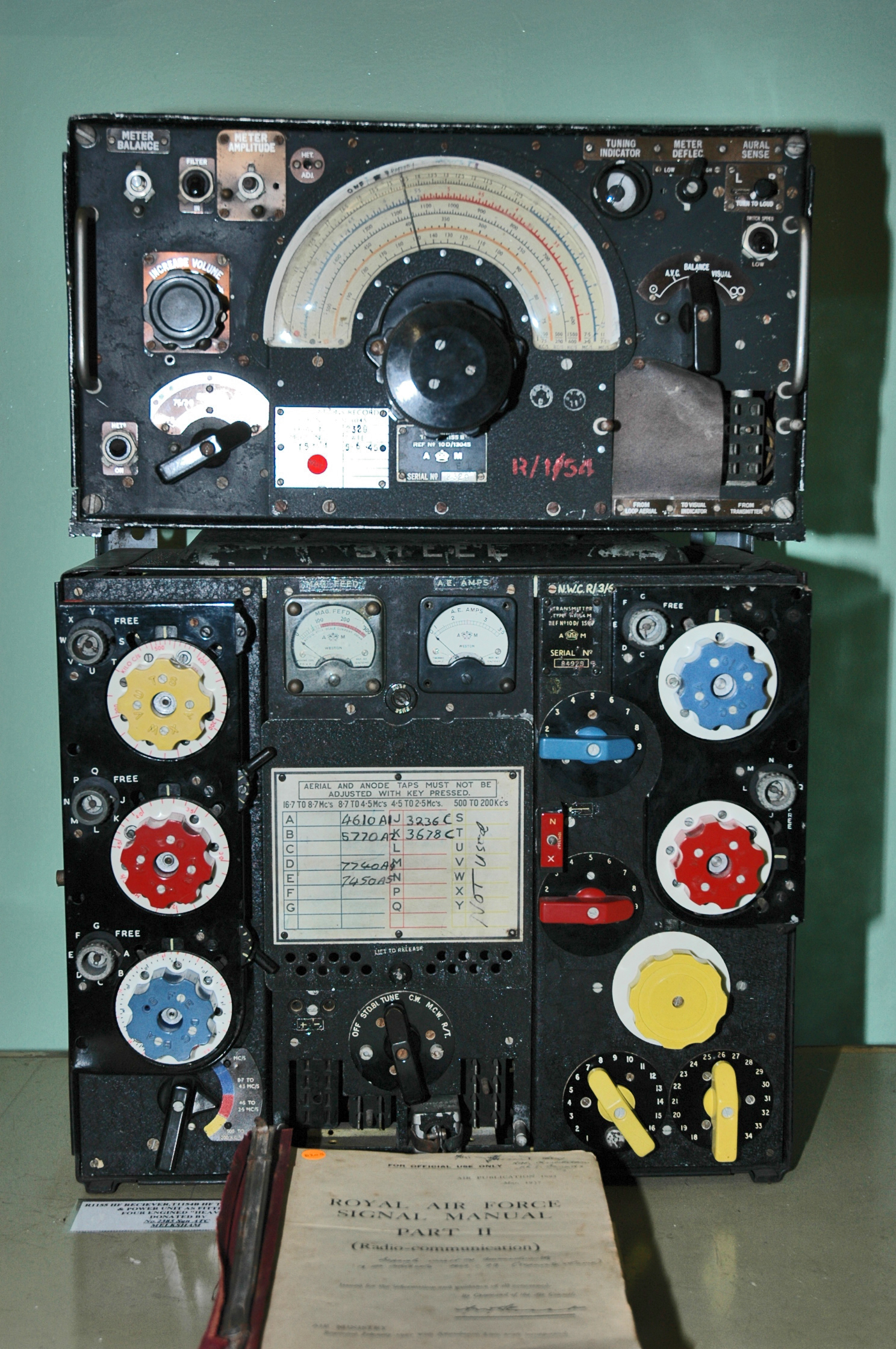
R1155 Receiver on top of a T1154 Transmitter.

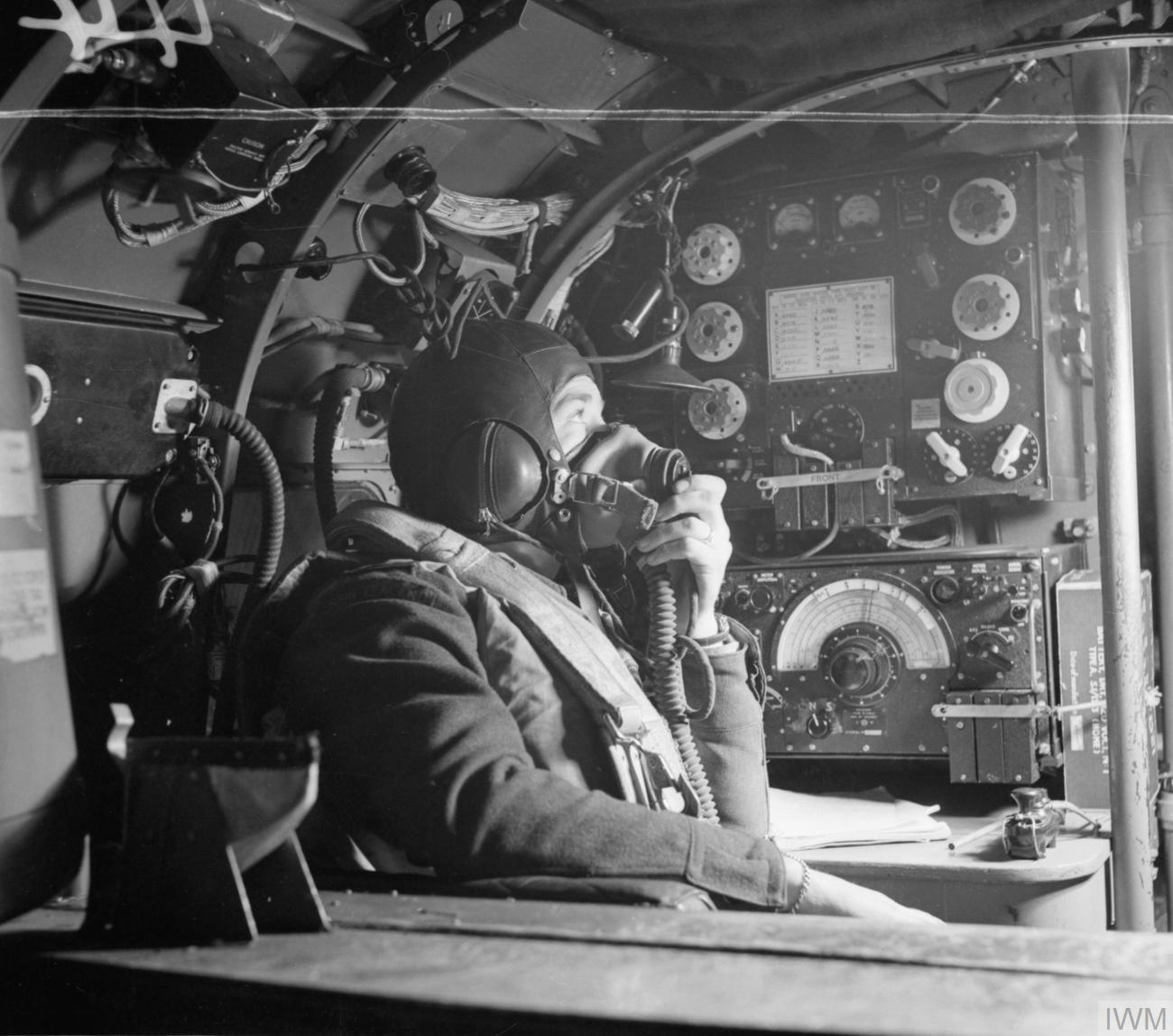
The wireless operator on an Avro Lancaster speaking to the pilot from his position in front of the Marconi T1154/R1155 transmitter/receiver set, circa 1943

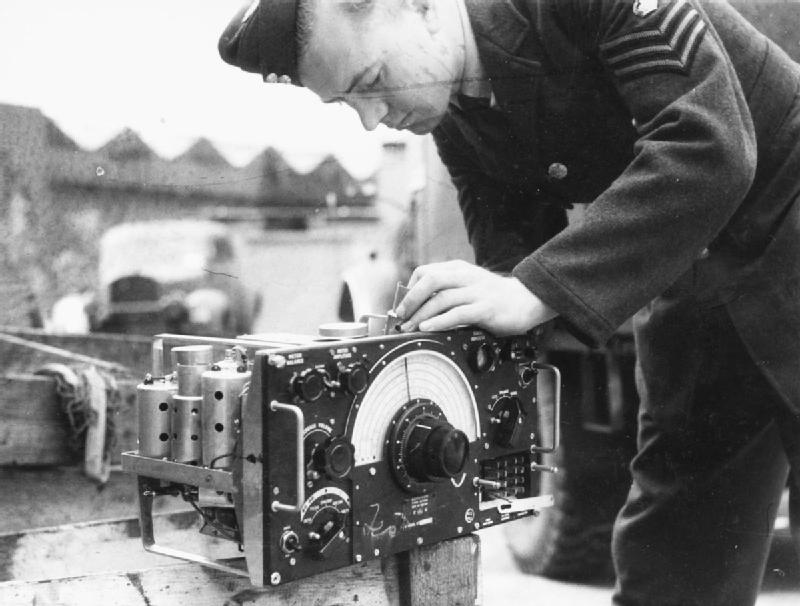
Inspection of an R1155

The R1155 was a British communications receiver, commonly used in aircraft along with its associated T1154 transmitter. It was used extensively by the Royal Air Force during World War II, mainly in larger aircraft such as the Avro Lancaster, Handley Page Halifax, Vickers Wellington and Short Sunderland. Some were also used in vehicles and air-sea rescue launches.

The R1155 and T1154 sets were manufactured by several British radio manufacturers, including EKCO, Marconi, Plessey, and EMI. Ekco, who manufactured the R1155 and T1154 at its Aylesbury shadow factory, carried out extensive development work on both units before putting them into production, significantly improving on the original Marconi design.

Large numbers of war surplus R1155 radios were modified for private use postwar.

== Different models ==
Receiver name	Case material	Information	Frequency ranges
R1155	Aluminium		18.5 MHz to 3 MHz & 1500 kHz to 500 kHz & 500 kHz to 75 kHz
R1155D	Steel	Same as model with no suffix	Same as model with no suffix
R1155A	Aluminium	Filters fitted to prevent interference	Same as model with no suffix
R1155E	Steel	Same as model A	Same as model with no suffix
R1155M	Aluminium	Same as model A but for use only at ground schools	Same as model with no suffix
R1155B	Aluminium	Same as A or E but with HF chokes added to prevent interference	Same as model with no suffix
R1155F	Steel	Same as B	Same as model with no suffix
R1155C	Aluminium	Same as A but modified for HF, direction finding obsolete.	Same as model with no suffix
R1155L	Aluminium	As B or F but with altered frequency ranges	18.5 MHz to 600 kHz & 500 kHz to 200 kHz
R1155N	Steel	Same as L	Same as L

== See also ==
- Tinsel (codename)
