= Chemring Group =

UK aeorospace and defence group

Chemring Group plc
- Formerly: Chemring P L C (1905–1986)
- Type: Public company
- Traded as: LSE: CHG; FTSE 250 component
- Industry: Aerospace and Defence
- Founded: November 30, 1905; 120 years ago
- Headquarters: Romsey, UK
- Key people: Carl-Peter Forster, chairman Michael Ord, CEO
- Revenue: ▲£497.5 million (2025)
- Operating income: ▲£73.4 million (2025)
- Net income: ▲£48.2 million (2025)
- Total assets: ▲£863.1 million (2025)
- Total equity: ▲£382.0 million (2025)
- Number of employees: 2,822 (2025)
- Subsidiaries: Roke Manor Research, Kilgore Flares Company, Non-Intrusive Inspection Technology, Titan Dynamics Systems, Alloy Surfaces, Mecar, 3d-Radar AS
- Website: chemring.co.uk

Chemring Group plc is a global business providing a range of advanced technology products and services to the aerospace, defence and security markets. Chemring has extensive operations in the Americas, Europe, Middle East and Asia.

The company was originally formed during 1905 as The British, Foreign & Colonial Automatic Light Controlling Company Limited, which manufactured timers for gas street lighting. Deciding to venture into electrical filaments, which were used for electric lights, it found demand for the technology from both domestic and foreign armed forces, using it as chaff, a radar decoy. During 1974, the company was first listed on the London Stock Exchange. In 1982, Chemring drastically increased its production of decoys to supply British forces engaged in the Falklands War.

The company again rapidly increased its rate of production of countermeasures to supply coalition forces in the Gulf War of 1991. In 1992, Chemring acquired its main British competitor Haley & Weller. In the following decades, Chemring acquired various businesses while expanding, particularly in the North American market. By 2010, Chemring Group reportedly held roughly 50% of the global market for countermeasures. It has also become the dominant supplier of such devices to both the UK and US armed forces. The company is presently headquartered in Romsey. It is listed on the London Stock Exchange and is a constituent of the FTSE 250 Index.

== History ==
=== Twentieth century ===
The business currently known as Chemring Group was established in 1905 as The British, Foreign & Colonial Automatic Light Controlling Company Limited, so named after its principal business of manufacturing timers for gas street lighting. These clockwork timepieces gradually replaced the need to employ human lamplighters to manually control street lighting. The company's equipment played a major role in the transformation of the UK’s street lighting from gas to electricity.

In the 1950s, the company decided to diversify, developing a proprietary process for the manufacture of silver-coated nylon filaments for lighting. The UK's Meteorological Office opted to procure these filaments, along with lightweight radar reflectors; they facilitated the accurate measurement of wind speed when attached to specially calibrated balloons. It was subsequently established that such filaments had an alternative use as chaff for radar decoy purposes. Both the Swedish Air Force and the UK Ministry of Defence became highly interested in using this chaff.

During 1974, the company was first listed on the London Stock Exchange. As a consequence of the Falklands War of 1982, Chemring established a new factory to produce aluminium glass chaff decoys; these were deployed across the vessels of the Royal Navy to counteract the threat of sea-skimming missiles. In 1986, Chemring acquired Pains Wessex, a firm specialising in pyrotechnics; since renamed Chemring Countermeasures Limited, the acquisition facilitated a move into infrared (IR) decoys.

The Gulf War of 1991, motived Chemring to rapidly increase its production of countermeasures; these were supplied in quantity to the US-led coalition forces. In 1992, the company acquired its main domestic competitor, Haley & Weller, which it renamed Chemring Defence UK Limited; this purchase meant that Chemring had become the principal supplier of the Ministry of Defence's countermeasure and military pyrotechnic needs. In 1993, Chemring established a presence in the United States with its first US acquisition, Alloy Surfaces Company Inc, which produced tailor-made decoys incorporating special materials.

=== Twenty-first century ===
The North American market has become of increasing prominence in the company's portfolio; in 2001, Chemring acquired Kilgore Flares Company LLC, this made the Group the largest provider of decoys to the United States Department of Defense. Chemring also expanded in Europe via acquisitions around this period. During November 2005, it purchased Comet GmbH, Pyrotechnik-Apparatebau, which was later renamed Chemring Defence Germany GmbH, from Diehl Stiftung & Co KG. In 2006, the Chemring Group acquired Poole based BDL Systems for £9 million.

During 2007, the Company acquired Simmel Difesa, an ammunition supply business; that same year, Richmond Electronics & Engineering, a business specialising in bomb disposal technology, was also purchased. In 2008, it went on to purchase Scot, a US specialist manufacturer of devices for aircraft emergency systems, space launch systems, and missiles; the firm was viewed as a natural counterpart to Chemring Energetics UK, an existing subsidiary. Another acquisition that year was Martin Electronics, a manufacturer of ammunition and fuses.

In 2009, Chemring acquired Hi-Shear Technology Corporation, a US leading manufacturer of high reliability energetic solutions that perform critical functions in key US space and defence programmes. In 2010, it purchased Roke Manor Research, a centre for advanced technology research and development based in Hampshire, UK from Siemens for £55m. By 2010, Chemring Group reportedly held roughly 50% of the global market for countermeasure flares, its market share having grown significantly over the previous decade; according to industry publication Flight International, much of the company's recent growth was attributable to the expanding countermeasures sector alone.

In 2011, the company acquired the Detection Systems operations and certain related assets of General Dynamics Armament and Technical Products, a subsidiary of General Dynamics Corporation; this entity has since operated as Chemring Detection Systems Inc, being a US leader in chemical and biological threat detection and has advanced capability in stand-off detection of improvised explosive devices. In 2012, Chemring disposed of its Marine interests, Chemring Marine, to Drew Marine.

In May 2014, Chemring acquired 3d-Radar AS, a Norwegian subsidiary of Curtiss-Wright Corporation, for $3 million; 3d-Radar AS was sold on during 2018. In 2016, Chemring acquired the key assets and technology of Wallop Defence Systems, a British subsidiary of Esterline, strengthening its air countermeasures portfolio.

== Operations ==
Chemring Group operates in four market sectors:

- Countermeasures – protecting aircraft, ships and land platforms against guided missile threats
- Sensors & Electronics – equipment to detect and disable concealed IEDs (improvised explosive devices), unexploded ordnance, electronic warfare and chemical and biological threats
- Pyrotechnics & Munitions – products for use in navy, army and air force applications
- Energetic Systems – propellant, explosives, missile and ammunition components, thrusters, initiators and other components for the space sector

The corporation owns Chemring Nobel (as of 2023); formerly its name was Dyno Nobel.

== Controversy ==
In 2002, a report on the BBC Today programme claimed that a salesman from PW Defence, a Chemring subsidiary, had agreed to sell landmines to an undercover reporter. The anti-personnel weapons were outlawed in the UK in 1998, following the signing of the Ottawa Treaty. Chemring Group insisted that it had never manufactured such products and had halted sales well in advance of the ban; six months later, it was exonerated of any wrongdoing; a dispute over the allegation was still ongoing between the BBC and Chemring two years later.

In 2011, it was revealed that CS gas produced by Chemring had been used against civilian pro-democracy protesters in the 2011 Egyptian revolution. Later in 2014, it was also revealed that tear gas used against demonstrators in the 2014 Hong Kong protests was provided by Chemring. In June 2019, following the use of CS Gas and other crowd-control measures by authorities against demonstrators in the 2019–20 Hong Kong protests, the UK Government ordered an immediate end to such sales to the region.

In 2018, it was announced that the UK's Serious Fraud Office (SFO) had opened an investigation into corruption and money laundering by Chemring Group following a report from Chemring's subsidiary, Chemring Technology Solutions (CTSL), which is also being investigated. A SFO spokesperson has stated that the inquiry is focused upon "the conduct of business by Chemring Group and CTSL".
