= Roke Manor =

Coordinates: 50.9995°N 1.5188°W

20th-century buildings at Roke Manor in 2006

Roke Manor is a 17th-century manor house approximately 1.2 miles (2 km) north-west of Romsey in Hampshire, England. The house and 22-acre (8.9 ha) grounds are the headquarters of Roke Manor Research Ltd, a subsidiary of Chemring Group.

== History ==
The first known reference to a settlement at Roke appeared in the 'Feet of Fines' papers of Southampton in 1256. In 1709 the estate was passed to a John Fifield of Stanbridge Earls and remained in the possession of his family until 1858. During this time many improvements were made to the house and grounds, and the house was renamed 'The Park'. The next owner, Thomas Wingate-Henderson, considerably enlarged the house and gave it its present appearance. In 1895 the estate amounted to about 270 acres (110 ha).

In 1935 the estate was bought by the Ansell family, a Birmingham-based brewery firm. Some of the Ansell racing cars were maintained at Roke until the 1950s. In 1956 the house and 22 acres (89,000 m^{2}) surrounding it were bought by the Plessey Company and named Plessey Research Roke Manor Limited. Plessey was taken over in 1990 and in 2010 the facilities were bought by Chemring Group; it continues in use as a research and development centre and the head office of Roke Manor Research Ltd.

The grounds had a walled garden, stable block and cottages when bought by Plessey, but since then all buildings except the house have been demolished and most of the grounds covered by buildings and car parks.
