= Roke Manor Research =

British research and development company

Coordinates: 50.9990°N 1.5202°W

Roke
- Type: Limited Company
- Founded: 1956
- Headquarters: Romsey, United Kingdom
- Number of locations: 4 (2025)
- Area served: Worldwide
- Key people: Marc Overton, Managing Director; Ian Cooper, Finance Director
- Number of employees: 828 (2022)
- Parent: Chemring Group PLC
- Divisions: Defence; National security; Geospatial intelligence
- Website: roke.co.uk

Roke (also known as Roke Manor Research) is a British technology and engineering company based at Roke Manor near Romsey, Hampshire. The company operates in the defence, national security and geospatial intelligence industries with clients in the public and private sector. Roke conducts research and development for technical areas including communications, electronic sensors, artificial intelligence, machine learning, and data science.

The company has been part of the Chemring Group PLC since 2010. It was originally an arm of Plessey and later of Siemens, during which time it operated primarily as a research facility.

== History ==
Roke was founded in 1956 as Plessey Research Roke Manor Limited by the Plessey company. Harold J. Finden, an electrical engineer at Plessey, was appointed as the company’s first managing director. In 1989, the company became part of GEC-Siemens AG following a joint takeover, and in 1991 it became wholly owned by Siemens after GEC sold its share in Siemens Plessey Electronic Systems.

In 2010, Roke was acquired by Chemring Group. During the 2020s, the company was awarded several UK Ministry of Defence contracts related to land intelligence, surveillance, target acquisition and reconnaissance (ISTAR) programmes. In October 2021, Roke received a £6.7 million contract under the British Army’s Land ISTAR programme, followed in October 2023 by a £40 million contract as part of Project ZODIAC.

In January 2023, Roke acquired the geospatial intelligence company Geollect. In April 2025, the company was awarded a UK missile defence research contract valued at £251 million under Project STORM, and in September 2025 it received a further British Army contract to support optimisation of Project ZODIAC.

== Sites ==
Roke's headquarters are at Roke Manor in Hampshire. The site is centred on a manor house dating partly to the 17th century, and was acquired by Plessey in 1956. Some original buildings remain alongside research facilities constructed on the site.

The company also operates facilities in Gloucester, Woking, and Manchester

== Technology timeline ==
In 1975, Roke undertook research relating to gallium arsenide microwave circuit technology as reported in technical publications of the period. During the mid-1990s, the company was involved in the development of the Hostile Artillery Location System (HALO), an acoustic detection system used for monitoring artillery activity, including during the Yugoslav conflicts. In 2000, Roke received the Worldaware Innovation Award for work related to land mine clearance.

In 2001, Roke contributed to early development work on the vision-based components of the Hawk-Eye ball tracking system. In 2006, the company developed Vigilance, a wide-area multilateration system for tracking aircraft. More recently, in 2025, Roke announced the launch of EM-Vis Deceive, an electromagnetic attack system.

== Selected products ==
Roke has developed a range of defence and security-related systems. These include EM-Vis Deceive, an electromagnetic attack system announced in 2025, and EM-Vis Resolve, an electromagnetic warfare system used for the interception and location of radio communications signals, which received a Queen's Award for Enterprise and Innovation in 2011.

The company has also developed EM-Vis Review (formerly known as Viper-Prefix), an electromagnetic warfare command system, as well as the Nav-Sync MRA, a miniature radar altimeter intended for positioning, navigation and tracking applications. In addition, Roke has worked on Nav-Sync Pulse, an enhanced Loran-based navigation system for terrestrial positioning and navigation.

Other systems associated with Roke include CORTEXA Guardian, a counter-uncrewed aerial systems (C-UAS) capability, and the provision of consultancy services related to post-quantum cryptography.
