= VITAC =

Provider of audio transcription services

- Company type: Private
- Industry: Closed Captioning; Accessibility Services; Audio Description; Subtitling
- Founded: 1986; 39 years ago
- Founder: Joe Karlovits
- Headquarters: Greenwood Village, Colorado, United States
- Area served: Worldwide
- Key people: Chris Crowell (CEO)
- Services: Closed captioning; Subtitling; Audio description; Encoding; Dubbing
- Owner: Verbit
- Number of employees: 700 (2022)
- Website: vitac.com

VITAC is an American audio transcription company that is headquartered in Canonsburg, Pennsylvania. It provides services such as closed captioning, dubbing, and audio description services.

The company has over 700 employees, with clients ranging from broadcast networks, to government agencies and educational institutions. VITAC is owned by Israeli company Verbit.

== History ==
VITAC was incorporated in March 1986 in Pittsburgh as American Data Captioning, Inc. It sold services under the name CaptionAmerica, and in 1993 changed its name to VITAC, an acronym for “VITal ACcess,” which refers to all services that make mass media accessible.

VITAC has been continuously providing closed captioning services since 1986. In 2000, VITAC was sold to Word Wave, Inc. In 2006, Word Wave, Inc. was acquired by Merrill Corporation. In August 2012, VITAC acquired Closed Captioning Services.

In 2016 The Gores Group, a global private equity firm specializing in acquiring and partnering with mature and growing businesses, acquired VITAC.

In 2017, VITAC acquired Caption Colorado, which was founded in 1991 and expanded to become the second-largest captioning company in the United States with a focus on regional and local newscasts.

In 2020, VITAC acquired VITAC Canada (formerly SOVO Technologies), a Montréal, Canada-based provider of captioning and transcription services known for their artificial intelligence and speech recognition technology.

In 2021, VITAC was acquired by Verbit, which then acquired U.S. Captioning in May 2022.

== Offices ==
VITAC operates out of offices in Canonsburg, Pennsylvania, Greenwood Village, Colorado, and Montréal, Quebec, as well as the hundreds of home offices of real-time captioners all over the country.

== Advocacy ==
From 2007 to 2010, VITAC campaigned with the Coalition of Organizations for Accessible Technology (COAT) on the Twenty-First Century Communications and Video Accessibility Act of 2010.

The company served on the Federal Communications Commission’s (FCC) Video Programming Accessibility Advisory Committee for benchmarking captioning TV shows via IP from 2010 to 2012, and was appointed by the FCC to help create a Closed Caption Quality Best Practices guide in 2014. From 2016 to 2020, VITAC served on the FCC’s Disability Advisory Committee, a group formed to provide advice and recommendations to the commission on a wide variety of disability issues.

== See also ==
- Closed captioning
- Subtitling
- Post Production
