= Plessy =

Plessy is a surname. Notable people with the surname include:

- Homer Plessy (1858, 1862 or 1863 – 1925), American shoemaker and activist
- Jeanne Arnould-Plessy (1819–1897), French actress

== See also ==
- Plessey
- Plessy v. Ferguson, U.S. Supreme Court Case, argued by Homer
