= Allen Clark Research Centre =

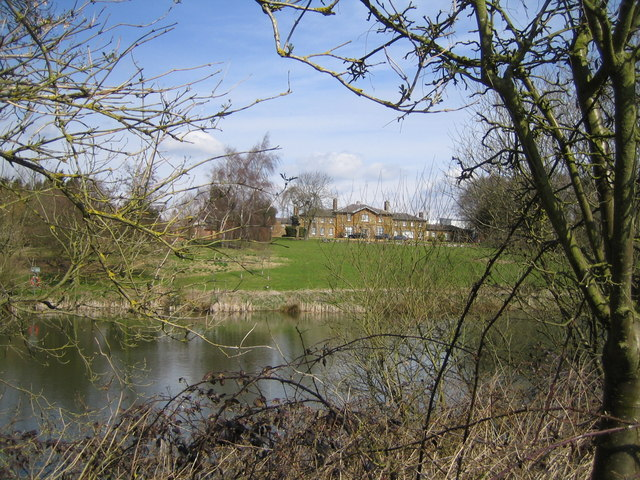

- Location within Northamptonshire

General information
- Type: Physics research centre
- Location: Northamptonshire NN12 8EQ
- Coordinates: 52.154°N 1.049°W
- Elevation: 30 m (98 ft)
- Completed: 1964
- Inaugurated: 20 March 1964
- Owner: Lumentum

Dimensions
- Other dimensions: 25 acres (10 ha)

The Allen Clark Research Centre was a solid-state physics optoelectronics research centre of the Plessey company at Caswell, near Towcester, Northamptonshire, England.

== History ==
It was opened on Friday 20 March 1964 by the Duke of Edinburgh. He toured the laboratories and took lunch there, in the company of James Orr and the Earl of Kilmuir. The Duke unveiled a memorial to Sir Allen Clark.

The site was named after Sir Allen George Clark (1898–1962), who was succeeded by his son Sir John Allen Clark (1926–2001).

The site won the 1974 Queen's Award for Technology, for silicon integrated circuits.

The Duke of Kent visited on the morning of Thursday 9 May 1974.

=== Scientists ===
- Sir Derek Roberts CBE FRS FREng (1932–2021), former director

== Research ==
It worked with the Physics department of the University of Sussex. It worked with Square D of the US in the late 1970s.

It conducted early work on fibre optic networks in the mid-1980s, with the fibre made by BICC, with a 107km test fibre-optic cable, with dispersion-shifted monomode fibre. It developed spectrum-splicing for fibres in the mid-1980s.

== Successor ==
The site is now Caswell Science Park, run by Lumentum Technology UK.

== See also ==
- Invention of the integrated circuit
- Timeline of electrical and electronic engineering
- Central Research Laboratories, EMI, west London
- Taplow Court, has carried out similar work for BT
