= Tinsel (codename) =

RAF radio-frequency jammer during the Second World War

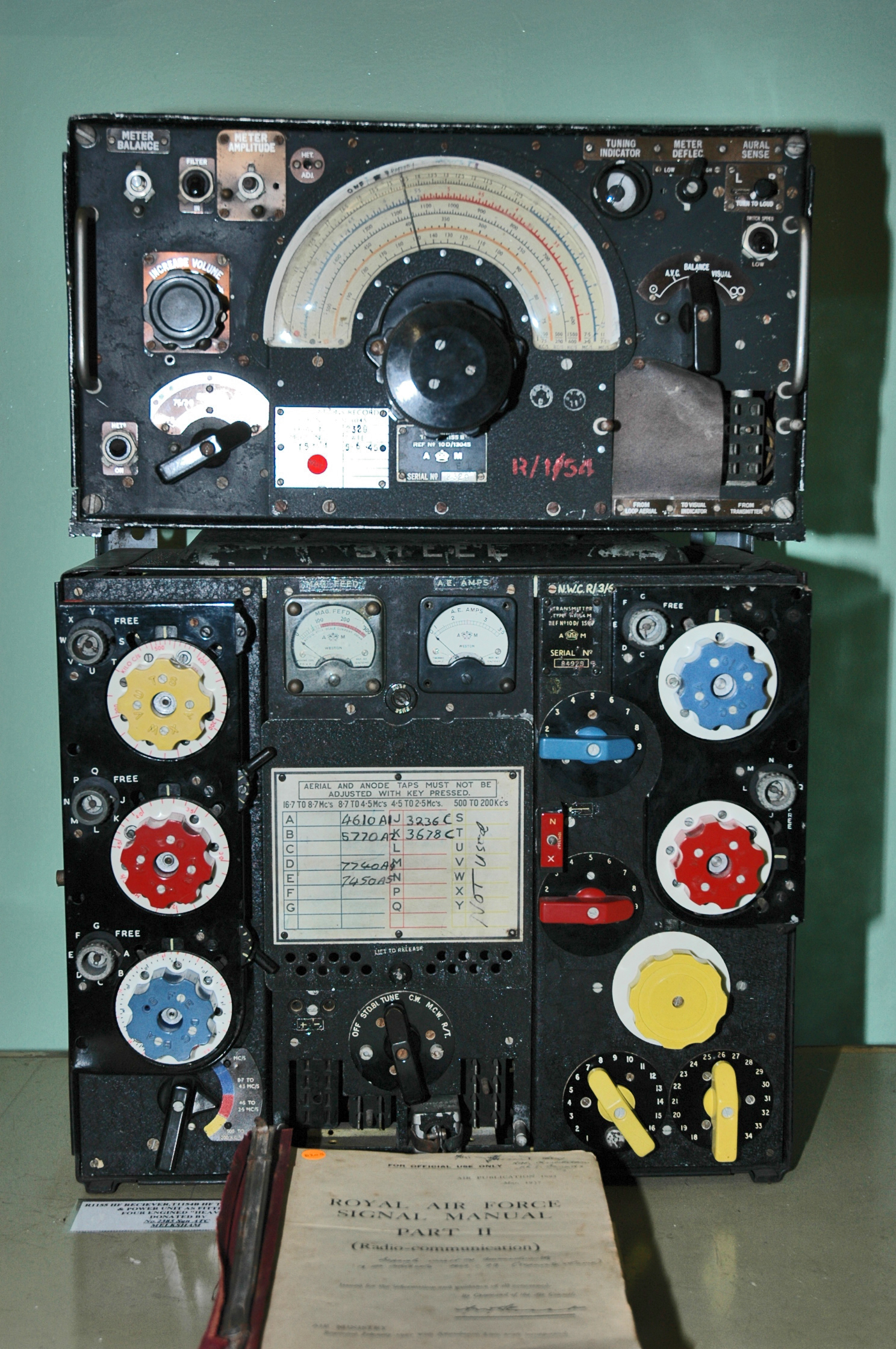
R1155 Receiver on top of T1154 Transmitter, used for Tinsel.

The codename Tinsel referred to a type of equipment carried by RAF bombers which was used to jam Luftwaffe night-fighter controller's speech radio-frequencies during the Second World War.

The equipment consisted of an audio microphone mounted inside one of the bomber's engine nacelles whose output fed into the aircraft's standard T1154 radio transmitter. The wireless operator could listen in to the frequencies used by the defending forces and then, when he heard a German transmission, tune his transmitter to the Luftwaffe frequency and transmit the amplified engine-noise on the same frequency, thus jamming the enemy transmission.

Although not very effective as a jammer, the noise produced merely acted as background noise to the transmitted speech, making it more difficult for the night-fighter crew to distinguish the instructions received from the ground.

== See also ==
- List of World War II electronic warfare equipment

== Bibliography ==
- Price, Alfred (2017) [1967]. Instruments of Darkness: The History of Electronic Warfare, 1939–1945 (2nd revised ed.). Barnsley, UK: Frontline Books. ISBN 978-1-47389-564-5.
