= Carl-Peter Forster =

British businessman (b.1954)

Carl-Peter Edmund Moriz Forster (born 9 May 1954, in London), is a British businessman. Forster was the group Chief Executive of Tata Motors between January 2010 and 9 September 2011.

Born in London, Forster was raised in London, Bonn and Athens. His father was a German diplomat. Forster holds degrees in Economics from Bonn University, and in Aviation and Space Technology from Technical University of Munich.

== Career ==
On graduation in 1982, Forster joined McKinsey as a consultant in Munich.

== BMW ==
In 1986, he joined BMW where he held various leadership positions before becoming managing director of BMW South Africa in 1996, and the board member responsible for all vehicle development projects in 1999.

== General Motors ==
In April 2001, Forster was appointed chairman and managing director of Adam Opel AG. In June 2004 he became President of GM Europe, based in Zurich, Switzerland, and Chairman of the Opel Supervisory Board. In April 2005 he also became Chairman of Saab. On 1 January 2006, he was additionally appointed General Motors Group Vice President and a member of the GM Automotive Strategy Board, and took over the role as the senior-ranking executive for GM’s activities in Europe.

On 3 November 2009 General Motors announced that it would retain ownership of its Opel subsidiary. Forster commented about GM's decision not to sell the units to Magna International:

Such a sudden shift isn't comprehensible. I hoped that it would have come to a much different outcome

On 6 November 2009 General Motors confirmed that Forster would be leaving all positions with GM Group globally.

== Tata Motors ==
On 15 February 2010 India's Tata Motors announced that Carl Peter Forster has been appointed as the group CEO with overall responsibility for Tata Motors globally, including that of its British unit Jaguar and Land Rover.

Following a surprise announcement on Friday 9 September 2011 it was revealed that Carl-Peter would step down from his group CEO role due to 'unavoidable personal circumstances'. However, he remained on the Tata Motors board of directors in a non-Executive capacity.

== Gordon Murray Design Limited ==
Ex-Tata group CEO joined Gordon Murray design house.

== Rexam ==
In June 2014 it was announced that Forster had been appointed a non-executive director of the UK packaging conglomerate Rexam.

== Personal life ==
Forster is married and has three children and lives in Oxford.
