= Siemens Plessey =

- Type: Private
- Industry: Aerospace/Defence; Electronics; Engineering
- Founded: 1989 (as Siemens Plessey)
- Defunct: 1997
- Fate: UK defence assets merged with BAe (1997); German defence assets merged with DASA (1997)
- Successor: BAe (1997 - 1999); DASA (1997 - 2000); BAE Systems (1999 till date); EADS (2000 till date)
- Headquarters: United Kingdom
- Products: Electronics

Siemens Plessey was the name given to the Plessey assets acquired by Siemens in 1989. Today most of these units are part of BAE Systems while some units are now part of EADS.

== History ==
=== Background: before 1989 ===
The history of the evolution of Siemens Plessey division traces to 1988, when the UK regulatory authorities rejected a full merger between the British-based industrial conglomerate - General Electric Company plc (GEC), and the Plessey company - a historic British-based international electronics, defence and telecommunications company founded in 1917. Plessey was at the time the second largest defence electronics contractor to the Ministry of Defence and the largest supplier of traffic control equipment. As a solution, GEC and Plessey merged their communications businesses the same year to form GEC Plessey Telecommunications (GPT).

=== Acquisition of Plessey, and Siemens Plessey: 1989-1997 ===
In 1989, GEC and Siemens AG set up a joint holding company, GEC Siemens plc, to launch a hostile takeover of Plessey, which succeeded. Most of Plessey's assets were divided between the companies (see: Plessey#Break-up of the business); except the 1988 founded GEC-Plessey joint venture - GPT, which was converted to a '60/40 GEC/Siemens joint venture'.

The division of Plessey between these two partners meant the deal met with little regulatory opposition. Siemens acquired Plessey's radar systems, defence systems and traffic control businesses. The defence electronics operations became Siemens Plessey Systems (commonly referred to as Siemens Plessey) and Siemens Plessey Electronics Systems (Australia).

In 1997, Siemens came to an agreement with British Aerospace and DaimlerChrysler Aerospace AG (DASA) for the takeover of its defence electronics unit. BAe acquired the Siemens Plessey's defence businesses in UK, while DASA acquired the German part of the operations.

=== Subsequent history: 1997 - to date ===
The BAe acquired parts were eventually amalgamated into BAE Systems - formed by the 1999 merger of BAe and Marconi Electronic Systems (MES). The DASA acquired assets became part of EADS in July 2000 when DASA merged with the French Aérospatiale-Matra and Construcciones Aeronáuticas SA (CASA) of Spain.

Siemens Traffic Controls continued to operate as a unit of Siemens which later became part of Siemens Mobility before being sold to Mundys under the new name Yunex Traffic.

== See also ==
- Break up of the businesses of Plessey
- History of GPT
