= Mercury Communications =

British telephone company

Mercury Communications Ltd.
- Industry: Telecommunication
- Founded: 1981
- Founder: Michael Edwardes
- Defunct: 1997
- Fate: Merged with Cable & Wireless (October 1996)
- Successor: Cable & Wireless
- Website: mercury.co.uk at the Wayback Machine (archived 1996-12-31)

Mercury Communications Ltd. was a national telephone company in the United Kingdom, formed in 1981 as a subsidiary of Cable & Wireless, to challenge the then-monopoly of British Telecom (BT). Although it proved only moderately successful at challenging BT's dominance, it led the way for new communication companies to attempt the same.

In 1997, Mercury ceased to exist as a brand after its amalgamation into the operations of Cable & Wireless.

Its name lives on through its association with and being the original sponsor of the Mercury Music Prize.

== History ==
=== Background: before 1981 ===
The history of telecommunications in the United Kingdom starts in 1879, with the establishment of its first telephone exchange in London by The Telephone Company (Bells Patents) Ltd. On 10 March 1881, National Telephone Company (NTC) was formed, which later brought together smaller local telephone companies. In 1898, to break the near-monopoly held by NTC, the Postmaster General's office, which was in charge of licensing new telephone companies, issued thirteen new licences. But by 1911, five of the remaining six competitors had been taken over by either the General Post Office (GPO) or NTC. Under the Telephone Transfer Act 1911, NTC was taken over by the GPO in 1912, and created a state-run monopoly that would run nearly all telecommunication assets in the UK for the next seventy years.

During the 1920s, there was increasing competition from companies using radio communications such as Marconi's Wireless Telegraph Company. In 1928, it was decided that all telecommunication assets outside the UK, and within the British Empire, particularly the telegraph companies, should be merged into one operating company. The merged entity was initially known as the Imperial and International Communications company, and from 1934 as Cable & Wireless.

Following the Labour Party's victory in the 1945 general election, the government announced its intention to nationalise Cable and Wireless, which was carried out in 1947. The company remained government-owned, continuing to own assets and operating telecommunication services outside the UK. All assets in the UK were integrated with those of the General Post Office, which operated the UK's domestic telecommunications monopoly.

In October 1969, the Post Office (a public corporation) replaced the General Post Office (a government department). In October 1981, the Post Office was split into two separate public corporations, the Post Office and British Telecommunications. In 1981, the Thatcher government started the process of privatising nearly all state-run monopolies, including British Telecommunications, British Airways, British Steel Corporation and British Aerospace. The act also started the privatisation of Cable & Wireless, whose primary business was then in Hong Kong.

=== Mercury: 1981–97 ===
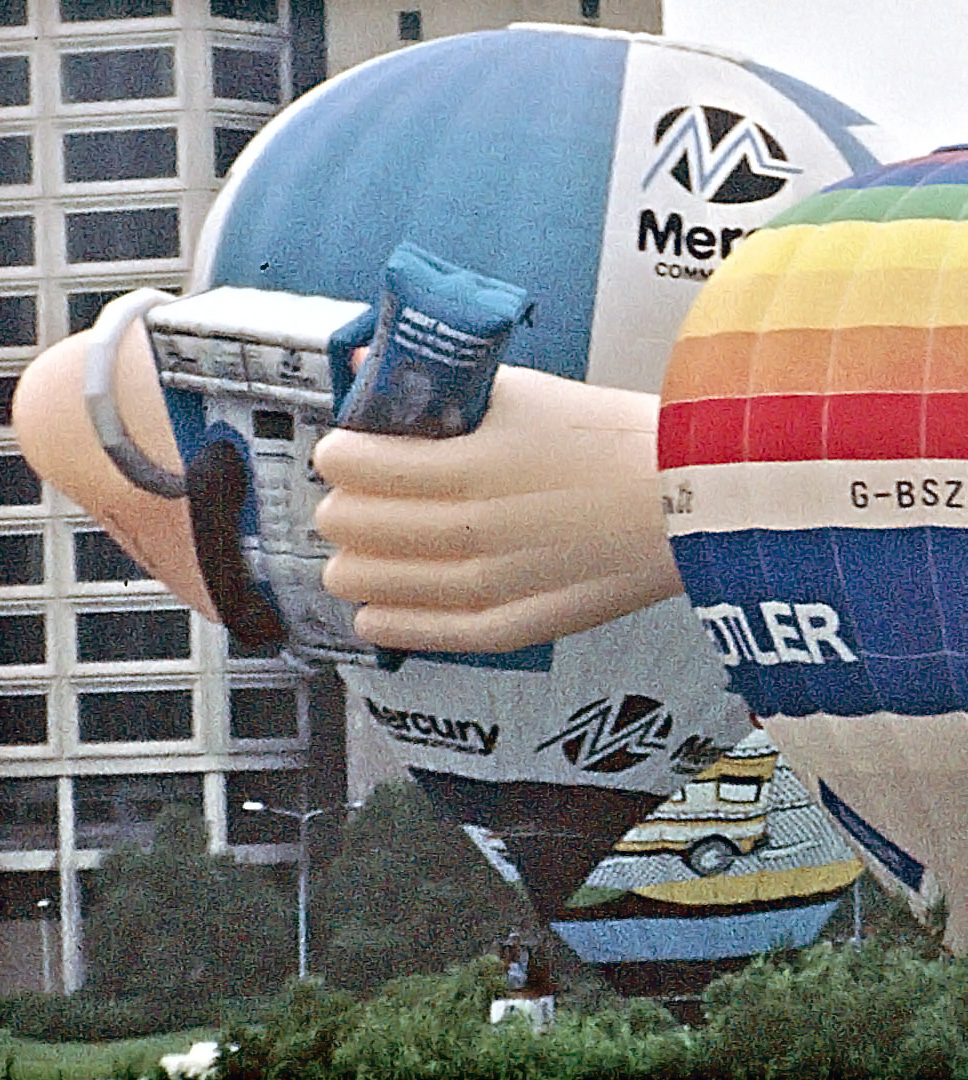
Promotional Mercury Communications hot air balloon featuring inflatable "payphone", 1994

In 1981, Mercury Communications Ltd – a consortium of Cable & Wireless, Barclays, and BP – was founded as an experiment in telecommunications competition, primarily to compete with British Telecom. Its first chairperson was Sir Michael Edwardes, known for his success in turning around British Leyland. Mercury Communications was first licensed in 1982, and became a full Public Telecommunications Operator in 1984. The same year, Cable & Wireless bought out the stakes of its partners.

In 1989, Mercury formed a consortium with Motorola and Shaye Communications to run Callpoint, a Telepoint-based nationwide mobile phone service. It could not successfully compete with cellular telephone technology and closed in June 1991.

In July 1991, Mercury's sister concern, Mercury Personal Communications Network (PCN) Ltd, was awarded one of the licences to develop and build a personal communications network (PCN) in the United Kingdom. The other two went to Microtel Communications (later Orange), and Unitel. PCNs were envisaged to be superior to the then-existent cellular phone technology, giving customers the flexibility to make or take calls in the home or car, in an aeroplane, or while on holiday.

In November 1992, Cable & Wireless sold a 20% stake for about £480 million to the Canadian company BCE, the parent company of Bell Canada International, which brought much-needed telecommunications expertise to Mercury. BCE also owned two cable companies in the UK.

One2One was established as the trading name of Mercury Personal Communications, a joint venture partnership equally owned by Cable & Wireless and US West International, a division of US WEST Media Group. One2One introduced Britain's first 1800 MHz GSM network in 1993, in competition with the existing mobile networks of Vodafone and Cellnet.

Mercury forged strategic alliances with 16 UK cable companies, which enabled them to offer both telephone and television services to their customers. By the end of January 1993, over 117,000 telephone lines were supplied to cable operators by Mercury. In October 1996, Mercury was merged with three cable operators in the UK (Vidéotron, Nynex and Bell Cable media) and renamed Cable & Wireless Communications (in which Cable & Wireless plc owned a 53% stake); the Mercury brand then ceased to be used.

Following this, the group embarked on a major disposal programme, selling One2One to T-Mobile in 1999, and selling its stake in CWC's consumer operations to NTL (now Virgin Media) in 2000.

== Operations ==
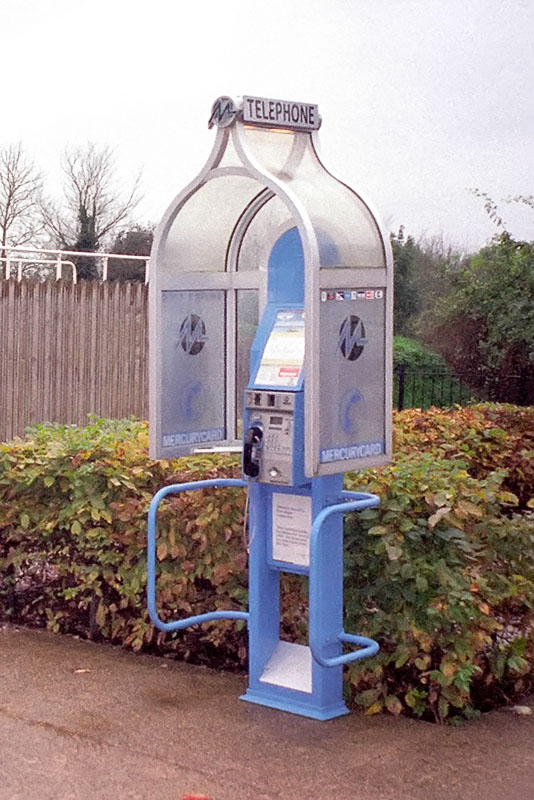
A Mercury Communications payphone kiosk

=== Payphones and mobiles ===
From 1986 Mercury operated public payphones in the UK, in competition with BT. These proved not to be profitable and this interest was sold in 1995. They were notable for their varied designs which imitated architectural styles.

Mercury also operated the first GSM 1800 mobile phone service, launched in 1993 as Mercury One2one. The service was first rolled out in the London area bounded by the M25, and offered free mobile to landline calls at off-peak times, weekends and Bank Holidays. Calls could be made free to landlines in the area the mobile was in, and to adjacent landline exchange codes. Even after this plan ceased being sold, SIM cards that were subscribed to the plan continued to provide these free calls, and often changed hands for large sums of money. Coverage was extended throughout the decade, with most of the UK having service by 1997. One2One was sold to Deutsche Telekom in 1999 for £8.4bn, and was rebranded as T-Mobile in 2002.

=== Fixed-line phone services ===
Mercury began by offering fixed-line facilities direct to business and residential customers. Callers could use the 'Mercury 2300' service via their existing BT phone line by dialling a '131' prefix followed by a ten-digit customer code, then the number they wished to dial. Some phones were manufactured with a 'Mercury button' which allowed the prefix and customer code to be stored and then dialled with a single button press.

Later, a more modern indirect service was introduced which required only the dialling of an access code (132) and the destination number. Mercury also provided backbone services to the emerging British cable operators which were beginning to offer their own fixed-line telephone services.

Mercury moved into the Private Branch eXchange market in 1990 as a result of Telephone Rentals being bought by Cable & Wireless. This enabled the Smart Box to be connected to a large number of TR's customers, so traffic was routed away from BT onto Mercury's network. Mercury pulled out of the PABX market in 1996, when it sold that part of the business to Siemens, creating Siemens Business Communication Systems (SBCS), which later became Siemens Communications.

In 1997 the Mercury brand ceased to be and it was amalgamated into Cable & Wireless Communications. The consumer arm of the latter would eventually be bought out by the telecommunications firm NTL in 1999, and then sold on to Npower in 2001 before the service was withdrawn entirely some years later.

Its name lives on through its original sponsorship of the Mercury Music Prize, now sponsored by Free Now.

== See also ==
- History of Cable & Wireless Communications
