= Allen George Clark =

American born, British industrialist and businessman

Sir Allen George Clark (August 24, 1898 – June 30, 1962) was an American-born British industrialist who helped to build the Plessey company into one of Europe's largest manufacturers of telecommunications equipment, military electronics and aircraft components.

== Early life ==
Allen George Clark was born in Brookline, Massachusetts in 1898. His father was Byron George Clark, an American businessman who worked for United Shoe Machinery (USM). In 1905, Clark and his parents emigrated to England. Following his education at Felsted School, Clark joined the British Army and was wounded at Cambrai in 1917. He later joined the Royal Flying Corps and served in Egypt. In 1927 he became a British citizen.

== Career ==
Clark joined the Plessey company in 1921 when his father bought a share of the company. Plessey was a small engineering company based in Ilford, Essex. Throughout the 1920s and 30s, Clark along with the engineer William Oscar Heyne built Plessey into a large engineering company.

During World War II, Plessey made an outstanding contribution to the nation's war effort producing munitions, aircraft components and electronic equipment. Clark remained in charge of the company throughout these times.

After the war, Plessey continued to expand under the guidance of Clark. New products included industrial hydraulics, radar equipment, telecommunications equipment and semiconductors. In 1961 Plessey acquired the British Ericsson Telephones and AT&E companies, to become Britain's largest telecommunications equipment manufacturer.

Clark was awarded a knighthood in 1961.

Allen George Clark died from cancer in 1962. After his death, both of his sons, John Allen Clark and Michael William Clark, continued to play an important role in the management of Plessey.
