= The Gores Group =

American private equity firm

The Gores Group, LLC
- Type: Private
- Industry: Financial services Asset management
- Founded: 1987; 39 years ago
- Founder: Alec Gores, chairman & CEO
- Headquarters: Beverly Hills, California, United States
- Products: Private equity
- Website: www.gores.com

The Gores Group, LLC is an American private equity firm specializing in acquiring and partnering with mature and growing businesses. The company was founded in 1987 by Alec E. Gores, who currently serves as its chairman and CEO.

Headquartered in Beverly Hills, California, with an office in Boulder, Colorado, and is investing from Gores Capital Partners III, L.P. and Gores Small Capitalization Partners, L.P., which have approximately $1.5 billion and $300 million in capital commitments, respectively. Since 1987, Gores has successfully acquired and operated more than 80 companies.

The company's portfolio as of 2021, includes technology, telecommunications, business services, industrial, media and entertainment and consumer products companies.

== History ==
In 1978, Alec Gores founded Executive Business Systems, a hardware and software distributor, which he sold eight years later to establish what has become the Gores Group today.

Gores closed its first institutional private equity fund, Gores Capital Partners, L.P., in November 2003 with $400 million of committed capital. The firm's second fund, Gores Capital Partners II, L.P. held a final closing in June 2007 with $1.3 billion of committed capital.

=== Timeline ===
==== 1978 ====
- Alec Gores launches his own computer company, Executive Business System (EBS), with $10,000; eight years later, he sells EBS for approximately $2 million current.

==== 1987 ====
- The Gores Group is founded by Alec Gores with the single vision to buy, fix and sell businesses.

==== 1997 ====
- Gores acquires Artemis, a subsidiary of Computer Sciences Corporation (NYSE: CSC).
- Gores completes its purchase of the Connection Machines business unit from Thinking Machines Corporation.

==== 1998 ====
- Gores carves out certain assets of the Computer Integrated Manufacturing (CIM) organization of Texas Instruments (NYSE:TXN); the portfolio company is later named Adventa Control Technologies.

==== 2000 ====
- Gores carves out The Learning Company and Mattel Interactive from Mattel and achieves an operating profit in the first 75 days of ownership.

==== 2001 ====
- Gores acquires VeriFone from Hewlett Packard Company.

==== 2003 ====
- Netherlands-based Anker BV, an independent European supplier of point of sale technology, was acquired, positioning Gores as an investor in Europe.
- The firm launches Gores Capital Partners, its first private equity fund.

==== 2004 ====
- Gores opens its London office, after several years of investment activity in the U.K. and Europe.

==== 2007 ====
- Gores closed on $1.3 billion in capital for its second institutional fund, Gores Capital Partners II, L.P.

==== 2008 ====
- Gores announced a joint venture with Siemens AG for enterprise communication business.

==== 2010 ====
- Sale of GCP II-owned Vincotech to Mitsubishi Electric demonstrates Gores’ global reach.

==== 2011 ====
- Gores sells Lineage Power to General Electric in what is the largest sale transaction in Gores’ history.
- Gores closes on $2.1 billion in capital commitments for its third institutional fund, Gores Capital Partners III, L.P.
- Gores acquires an 81.25% majority interest in fashion company Mexx for $85 Million

==== 2012 ====
- Gores Small Capitalization Partners, L.P. sells $300 million in commitments, expanding Gores’ resources for small and lower middle market investments.
- Acquires Harris Broadcast from Harris Corporation in December.

==== 2013 ====
- Stock Building Supply goes public, marking Gores' first U.S. IPO.

==== 2014 ====
- Gores announces plans to close 34 subsidiaries of 45 in total located in Germany and being part of Unify. Close downs are expected to be completed by Q2/2015.
- Gores acquired a 51% stake in Hovis Bread
- Gores sold Norment to Cornerstone, a full service detention equipment contractor based in Alabama
- Gores sells Sage Automotive Interiors to Clearlake Capital
- Gores sells Scovill Fasteners to Morito Co., Ltd., a leading global supplier of apparel fasteners

== Recognition ==
- On September 26, 2013, Cosmo Specialty Fibers was awarded the Chain-of-custody certification by the Programme for the Endorsement of Forest Certification. This certification recognizes Cosmo Specialty Fibers for using wood fiber sourced through sustainable forestry practices.
- On May 27, 2013, Ford Motor Company announced that it is working with Gores’ Portfolio Company, Sage Automotive Interiors, to accelerate the development of recycled fabrics. Sage is Ford's largest fabric supplier in North America, and provides Ford with fabric made from industrial waste and clear plastic water bottles. The 2013 Ford Fusion is the first vehicle sold around the world to use recycled fabrics.

== Representative transactions ==
- January 27, 2014: The Gores Group announced that it has reached a conditional agreement with Premier Foods to operate its bread business as a stand-alone venture under the name of Hovis Limited in order to increase operational efficiencies and grow the Hovis brand.
- August 14, 2013: Stock Building Supply Holdings, Inc. (Nasdaq:STCK) announced that it has closed its previously announced underwritten initial public offering of 7,000,000 shares of common stock at the price to the public of $14.00 per share. The underwriters exercised in their full option to purchase an additional 1,050,000 shares of common stock from certain selling stockholders, resulting in a total initial public offering size of 8,050,000 shares.
- July 30, 2013: Gores’ portfolio company, The Hay Group, announced that it had entered into an agreement to acquire Metallumform, an integrated manufacturer of forged machined automotive components with two plants in Germany. Terms of the transaction were not disclosed.
- January 2, 2013: The Gores Group announced that it had completed the acquisition of Therakos, Inc. from Ortho-Clinical Diagnostics, Inc.
- December 14, 2012: Charles Bank Capital Partners announced that it acquired United Road Services from The Gores Group for an undisclosed amount. Kathleen McCann, president and CEO, will continue to lead the company.
- October 15, 2012: The Gores Group announced that it extended a binding offer to acquire Therakos, Inc. from Ortho-Clinical Diagnostics, Inc. Therakos is company developing products for extracorporeal photopheresis (ECP) immune modulation therapy. The terms of the transaction were not disclosed.
- August 17, 2011: The Carlyle Group announced that it had completed the acquisition of French-based Sagemcom, a global high-technology group specializing in broadband communications and energy activities, from The Gores Group. Carlyle said in a statement it now owned 70 percent of Sagemcom, while the company's management and employees had the remaining 30 percent. Sagemcom has more than 6,000 employees globally and posted sales of 1.4 billion euros in 2010.
- May 9, 2011: The Gores Group announced that it partnered with management to acquire Sage Automotive Interiors, Inc., a supplier of specialty fabric materials for the automotive industry, a portfolio company of Azalea Capital, LLC.
- January 13, 2011: General Electric Co. agreed to buy Lineage Power Holdings Inc. for $520 million from The Gores Group. Lineage supplies equipment that converts power to direct current from alternating current as well as power-module and data-center systems in the $20 billion micro power source industry.

== Portfolio ==
Current (2024)

- Imagine Communications - Developer of advanced broadband video processing equipment
- TurbineAero - Manufacturer of industrial parts and components, specializing in the design and production of aerospace and hot-section components. also offers maintenance, repair and overhaul services to military, commercial, original equipment manufacturers and aircraft operators

Select Exited

- Alliance Entertainment
- AMI Entertainment Network
- Alpheus Communications
- BMC Stock Building Supply
- DataBlue
- Elo Touch Solutions
- GatesAir
- Hovis Bakery
- Sage Automotive Interiors
- Therakos
- Unify
- Vitac

=== SPACs ===
Beginning in 2015, Gores Holdings was announced, specializing in special-purpose acquisition companies (SPACs). It was credited with starting the SPAC revival with their first SPAC transaction in Hostess Brands. Gores is considered one of the most prolific investors in the SPAC space, having created 13 SPACs, more than any other single investor, and The Gores Group is considered a premier SPAC sponsor.

Gores announced or completed more than seven SPAC transactions representing over $36 billion in transaction value.

- Hostess – consumer, maker of Twinkies. Partnered with Apollo and Dean Metropoulos
- Verra – technology mobility services, specializing in red light cameras, school bus safety, and tolling
- PAE – government logistics services business with large government contracts
- Luminar – first high growth, technology company, influential in the automotive Lidar space. Partnered with founder, Austin Russell
- United Wholesale Mortgage (UWM) – mortgage tech business. Largest SPAC transaction to date
- Matterport – 3D spatial data company involved in the real estate industry
- Ardagh Metal Packaging (AMP) – metal packaging for consumer products. Largest SPAC spin out of public company. Merger with Gores Holdings V, raising almost $1 billion in gross proceeds
- Sonder – a hospitality company. Merger with Gores Metropoulos II
- Polestar – a global premium EV company. Publicly listed through combination with Gores Guggenheim, Inc. Resulted in an implied enterprise value of $20 billion

Gores launched Gores Holdings VII and Gores Holdings VIII in 2021, and publicly filed for Gores Technology Partners and Gores Technology Partners II, as well as Gores Guggenheim, the latter in partnership with Guggenheim Partners.
