= Ericsson Telephones =

British telephone equipment manufacturer based in Beeston, Nottinghamshire

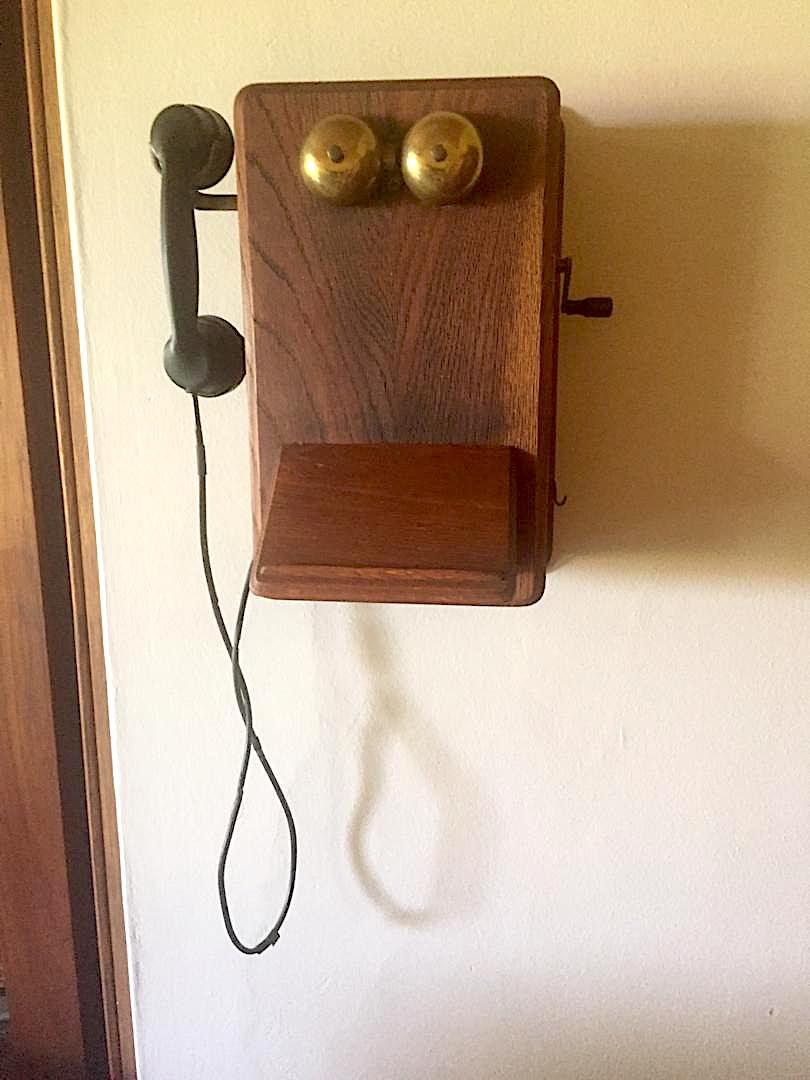
- An Ericsson telephone on a Kalahari-Farm in Namibia
- Type: Private company
- Industry: Telecommunications
- Predecessor: British L. M. Ericsson Manufacturing Co.
- Founded: 1903
- Founder: Joint-venture between the National Telephone Company (NTC) and L. M. Ericsson
- Defunct: 1961
- Fate: Acquired
- Successor: Plessey
- Headquarters: Beeston, Nottinghamshire, United Kingdom
- Area served: United Kingdom and the Commonwealth
- Products: Telecommunication equipment, telephones

Ericsson Telephones (ETL) was a British telephone equipment manufacturer based in Beeston, Nottinghamshire. The company operated from 1903 until it was acquired by Plessy in 1961.

== History ==
The company was founded as British L. M. Ericsson Manufacturing Co. Ltd. in 1903 as a joint-venture between the National Telephone Company (NTC) and L. M. Ericsson (Telefonaktiebolaget L. M. Ericsson).

The National Telephone Company had established a factory in Beeston, Nottinghamshire in 1901, and from 1903 this became ETL's manufacturing site.

After the National Telephone Company's operations were taken over by the General Post Office in 1912, the company became solely owned by Ericsson.

The company was renamed to Ericsson Telephones Limited in 1926.

In 1948, ETL become fully independent of L. M. Ericsson. L. M. Ericsson then formed the Swedish Ericsson Company Limited to maintain a trading presence in the UK (for overseas sales, for example to the Commonwealth, although in 1948 L. M. Ericsson agreed with ETL not manufacture in the UK for 20 years, and sold its ETL shares.

ETL remained an independent company until 1961, when it was acquired by Plessey and ceased to exist as a separate brand; see Graces Guide.

== See also ==
- Ericsson
- Plessey
- Dekatron
