= Plessey =

British electronics, defence and telecommunications company

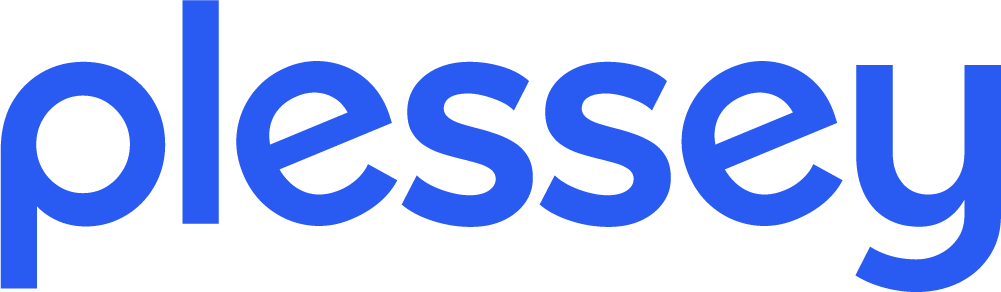
- Type: Public company
- Industry: Semiconductor and photonics
- Founded: 1917
- Fate: Acquired by GEC and Siemens
- Successor: GEC (1989–1999); Siemens Plessey (1989–1997); Marconi Communications (1998–2006); Siemens Communications (1998–2006); BAE Systems (1999 till date); Plessey Semiconductors (2010 till date)
- Headquarters: Plymouth, England
- Website: plessey.com

Selection of Plessey products in Redbridge Museum

The Plessey Company plc was a British electronics, defence and telecommunications company. It was listed on the London Stock Exchange and was a constituent of the FTSE 100 Index until it was acquired by GEC and Siemens in 1989.

Plessey was established in 1917 with an initial focus on mechanical engineering; it diversified into electronics manufacturing in the 1920s, producing radios for Marconi and telephones for the General Post Office, along with various aircraft components during the 1930s. During the Second World War, Plessey's production capacity was used for the British war effort; it was during this time that it operated an underground factory in five miles of tunnels originally built for the London Underground. During the Cold War, the company expanded primarily via the acquisition of other companies as well as the formation of overseas subsidiaries. In 1961, Plessey merged with Ericsson Telephones and the Automatic Telephone Manufacturing Company to become the largest manufacturer of telecommunications equipment in Britain. Plessey played a role in the development of innovations such as the Atlas computer and System X digital telephone exchange. In 1988, Plessey and the General Electric Company (GEC) merged their telecom units to form GEC Plessey Telecommunications (GPT).

In 1989, the company was taken over by a consortium formed by GEC and Siemens, which split the assets of the Plessey group. The majority of Plessey's defence assets were amalgamated into BAE Systems in 1999 when British Aerospace merged with the defence arm of GEC, Marconi Electronic Systems. The Plessey Microsystems division was the subject of a management buyout in 1988 becoming Radstone Technology, which survives today as part of Abaco Systems based in Towcester, Northamptonshire. The bulk of Plessey's telecommunications assets were acquired by Ericsson through its 2005 acquisition of Marconi Communications, a successor company of GEC.

The Plessey brand continues to be used by a subsidiary of Haylo Labs Limited, which originated as Plessey Semiconductors and makes optical semiconductors.

== History ==
=== Early history ===
The Plessey company was founded in 1917 in Marylebone, central London. The original shareholders were Thomas Hurst Hodgson, C. H. Whitaker, Raymond Parker and his brother Plessey Parker. A talented German engineer, William Oscar Heyne, was employed by the company. Heyne later became the managing director and chairman of Plessey and was one of the key figures in the development of Plessey during the 1920s and 1930s. The company moved to Cottenham Road in Ilford early in 1919. In 1925, the original company was wound up and a new one was formed with a greater share capital. Most of the early work carried out by the company was in mechanical engineering.

=== The Clark connection ===
An early customer of Plessey was a galvanising company called British Electro Chemists. One of that company's shareholders was Byron G. Clark, an American, who was also a business associate of T. H. Hodgson, one of the founders of Plessey. The Clark family would eventually dominate the management of Plessey for most of its history. Byron's son Allen George Clark joined the company in 1921, and went on to become a driving force behind the development of Plessey, followed later by his sons John Allen Clark, and Michael William Clark, both of whom rose to prominent positions in the company.

=== Electrical manufacturing ===
During the 1920s, Plessey began to diversify into electrical manufacturing. Important contracts included the manufacture of early radios for Marconi and the production of telephones for the General Post Office. In order to increase production, Plessey moved to Vicarage Lane, Ilford, in 1923. In 1929, the television pioneer John Logie Baird had his first production televisions made by Plessey. The company also produced the first British-made portable radio in the same year.

The manufacture of electrical components became an area of growth for Plessey. A vast array of components was manufactured, many under licence from overseas companies. Plessey became one of the largest manufacturers in this field as the radio and television industries grew. In 1936/7, turnover was more than £1 million and Plessey became a public company on 17 March 1937.

=== Aircraft components ===
Aircraft components was another market into which the company diversified. In 1936, Plessey obtained a number of important manufacturing licences from American companies such as Breeze Corporation for aircraft multi-pin electrical connectors, Federal Laboratories for Coffman starters (an explosive cartridge device used to start aircraft engines), and Pump Engineering Services Corporation for the manufacture of Pesco fuel pumps. Plessey went on to produce large numbers of these fuel pumps for Rolls-Royce Merlin engines, and in 1940 the fuel pump for Britain's first jet engine was also supplied by Plessey.

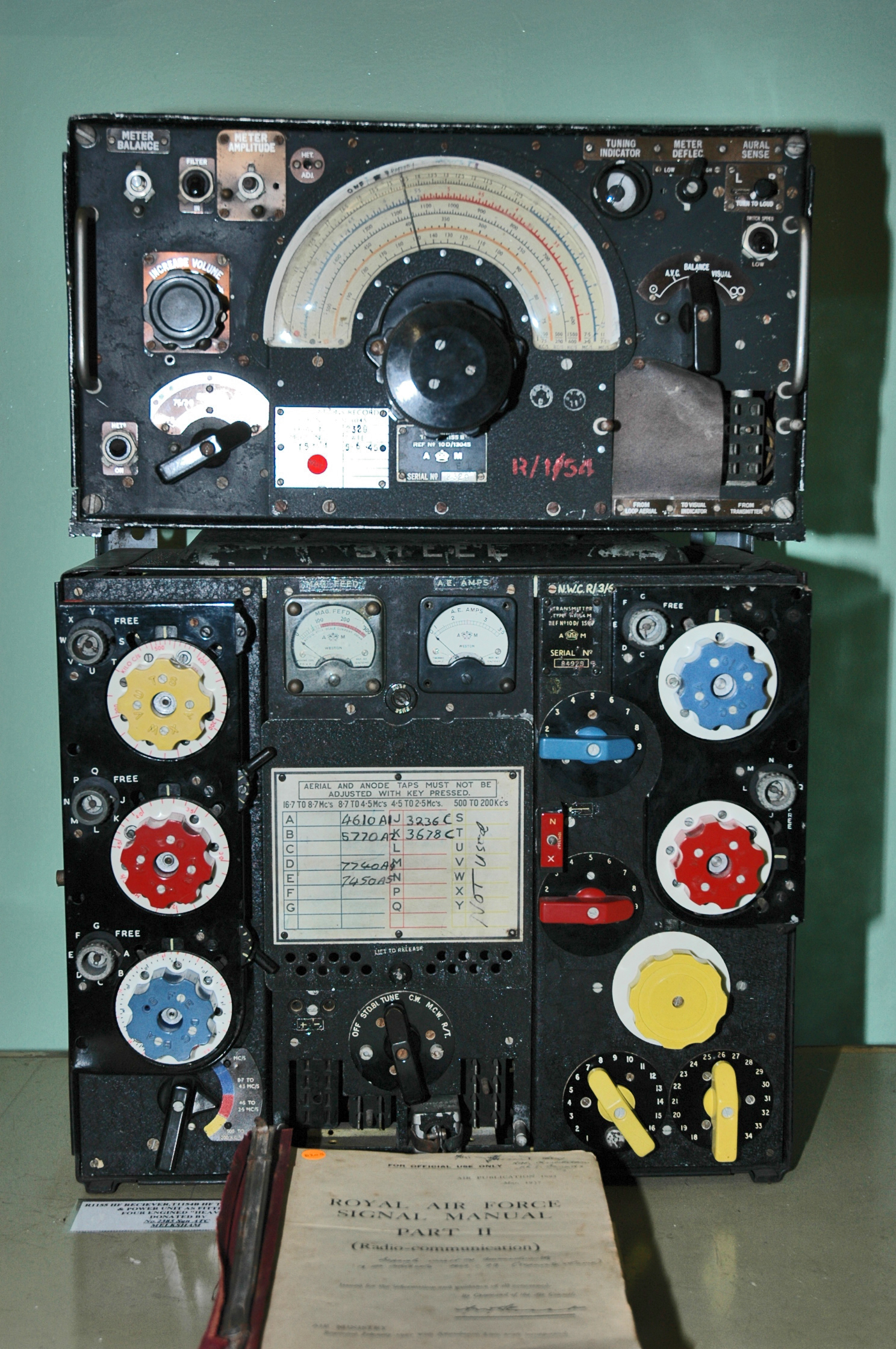
R1155 receiver on top of T1154 transmitter

=== Second World War ===
During the Second World War, Plessey produced a vast array of components and equipment for the war effort, including shell cases, aircraft parts, and radio equipment such as the R1155 (receiver), and T1154 (transmitter). In all, 161,500 pieces of wartime electronic equipment were produced.

To allow greater production, Plessey converted five miles (8 km) of twin tunnel, built for a new extension to the London Underground Central line from Leytonstone to Newbury Park, into a factory. The company also built a new factory at Swindon in Wiltshire, and opened several other shadow factories around the country to produce munitions. Caswell, Northamptonshire became the site of Plessey's first dedicated research centre in 1940. The wartime workforce of Plessey grew to over 10,000.

=== Post World War II ===
With the end of the conflict, the company's orders dropped from £5 million in 1944/5 to £263,000 in 1946 and the workforce fell to less than 6,000. Radio and television sales were the main area of activity until the renewed demand for defence products with the onset of the Korean War. From a turnover of £5 million in 1949/50, there was an increase to £32 million in 1959/60.

In 1951, the Electronics Division was started by Michael Clark. By 1955, this had expanded to become the Electronics and Equipment Group with 5,000 staff. During the following year, the Roke Manor research facility was set up under the direction of H. J. Finden near Romsey, Hampshire. Plessey produced an early integrated circuit model in 1957, before the patents of Jack St. Clair Kilby of Texas Instruments and Robert Noyce of Fairchild. In the 1960s, the Group continued to expand, setting up facilities at places such as West Leigh (Havant, Hampshire) and Templecombe, Somerset.

Plessey Electronics logo

In 1961, Plessey merged with Ericsson Telephones and the Automatic Telephone Manufacturing Company of Liverpool, to become Britain's largest manufacturer of telecommunications equipment, including the majority of the country's crossbar switches. Alongside the Telecommunications Division, three other businesses were set up: Plessey Avionics and Communications, Plessey Radar and Plessey Marine. In the late 1960s, English Electric was subject to a takeover bid by Plessey, but chose instead to accept an offer from GEC. In 1970, the Command and Control unit was set up at Christchurch, Dorset, which became the centre of the Plessey Defence Systems business. In 1979, a major subsidiary was set up, Plessey Electronic Systems, which incorporated the three businesses and by 1986 achieved sales of over £500 million and employed 15,000.

Plessey were partners in the development of the Atlas Computer in 1962 and in the development of digital telephone systems, including System X, from the late 1970s. In 1988, Plessey's Telecommunications Division merged with that of GEC to become GEC Plessey Telecommunications. Plessey Naval Systems was formed in 1986 by the merger of Plessey Marine with Plessey Displays, which had been part of Plessey Radar. Plessey were among the first firms to use computers. Their Training Department developed an interactive management game (PITDEX) using TeleType printer/keyboards to link to LEASCO computers in the United States via standard telephones and acoustic couplers.

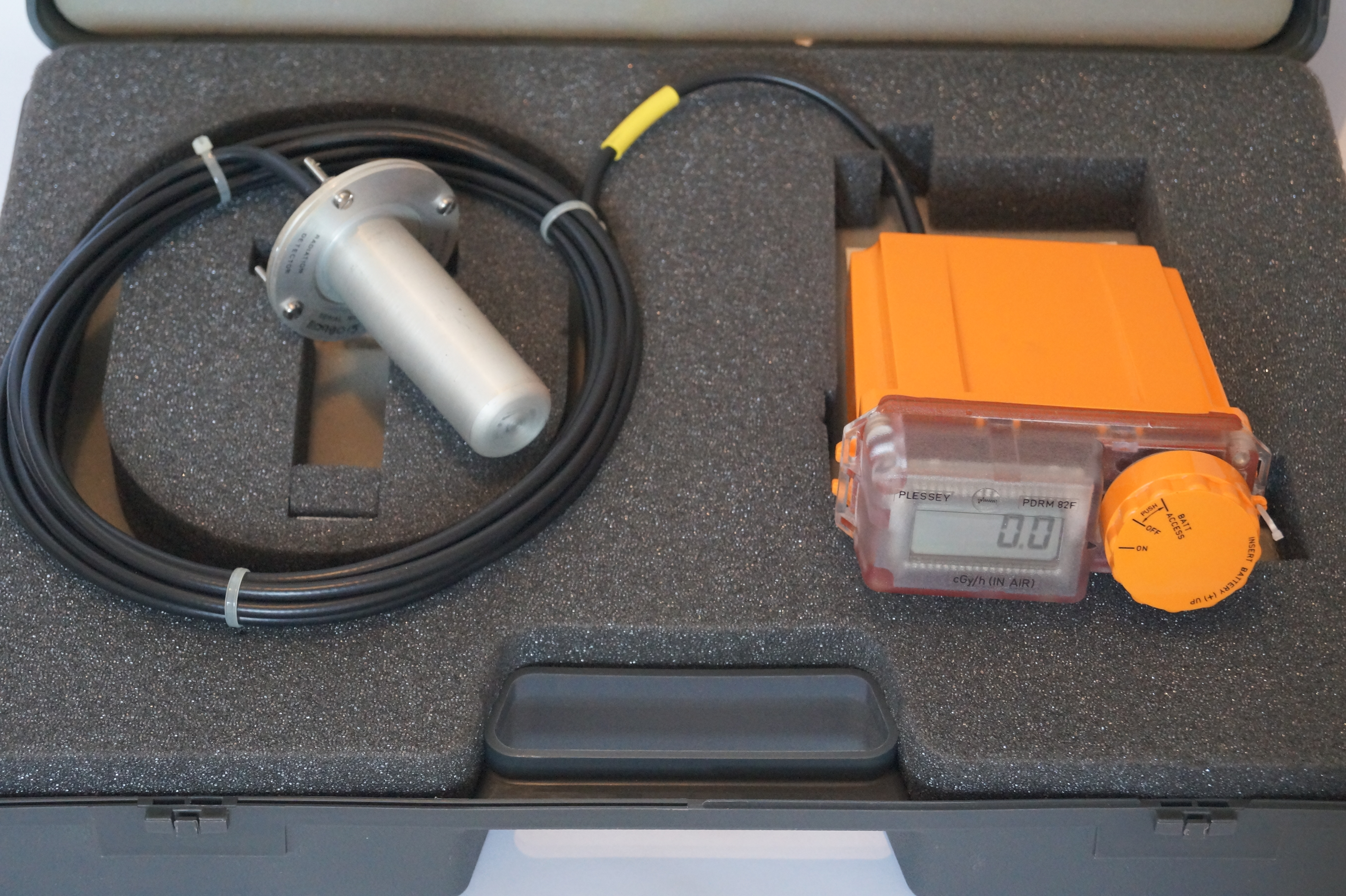
Plessey PDRM82F Geiger counter

Plessey also pioneered the gathering and consolidation of accounting information from around the world using in-house software. Each of their 140 management reporting entities used HP125s with DIVAT (data input, validation and transmission) software. Nearly 450 validation rules ensured accuracy within and between various reports. The data were then transmitted to Ilford where a HP 3000 ran Fortran software for consolidation and reporting—also on HP125s. By 1972, Plessey designed the first industrial capability-based security computer, a fault-tolerant multiprocessor system called Plessey System 250. Plessey was also the lead contractor for the Ptarmigan communications system supplied to the British Army, which adopted the System 250 architecture.

A division focused on microcomputing, Plessey Microsystems, was founded in 1975, having licensed the 16-bit Miproc processor architecture developed by the Norwegian Defence Research Establishment and Aksjeselskapet Mikro-Elektronikk. In contrast to the existing implementation, announced with a 200 ns cycle time, Plessey introduced Miproc with a 350 ns cycle time as part of a development system costing $5,000. During the 1970s and early 1980s, Plessey manufactured a series of computer systems and peripherals compatible with Digital Equipment Corporation's PDP-11, some based on the Miproc product which was itself revised to operate with a faster 250 ns cycle time. The company would eventually expand its Miproc range to include the Miproc RTS, running the RTX real-time operating system, alongside Plessey's other product lines featuring semiconductor and bubble memory, and microprocessor-based data terminals.

Plessey Controls, from 1982 to the mid-1980s, also manufactured a type of Geiger counter known as the Portable Dose Rate Meter (PDRM). It gave highly accurate readings, using the Gray system of measurement and used standard torch batteries. They were built for civil defence, but also used by the British Army. Most ended up in the hands of the Royal Observer Corps and manufacture would discontinue by the late 1980s.

=== UK air defence ===
In 1959, AT&E, later Plessey, became the prime contractor for a new UK air defence system, known by the company under the name Plan Ahead and, from 1961, as Project Linesman. To enable the system to be designed and built without too much information becoming public knowledge, a new factory called "Exchange Works" was built in Cheapside in Liverpool city centre, where young employees were granted exemption from conscription.

At the heart of the system, installed in a huge building in the middle of a council housing estate in West Drayton, was the computer room, occupying an area of around 300 by 150 feet (91 m × 46 m) and filled with around 1,000 7-foot-high (2.1 m) racks of electronics, including mainly the XL4 computer, based entirely on germanium transistors and using a computer language developed at Exchange Works in the 1950s and 1960s. The secure status of the factory attracted many other secret contracts and led to it becoming one of the major designers and manufacturers of cryptographic equipment. Exchange Works is now luxury flats.

=== South Africa ===
The South African roots of Plessey can be traced to the acquisition of AT&E and Ericsson in 1963, and a Cape Town based company, the Instrument Manufacturing Company (IMC), acquired in 1964.

At the time, IMC was in the process of industrialising a unique South African invention, the Tellurometer, the first successful microwave electronic distance measurement equipment. The instrument was invented by Dr. Trevor Lloyd Wadley of the Telecommunications Research Laboratory of the South African Council for Scientific and Industrial Research (CSIR), also responsible for the Wadley loop receiver, which allowed precision tuning over wide bands, a task that had previously required switching out multiple crystals.

South African insurance and investment company Sanlam bought 26% of Plessey South Africa in 1974, with first right of refusal to purchase more of the company. These shares were later transferred to Sankorp, Sanlam's industrial holdings company. In 1989, when GEC-Siemens took control of the Plessey Company, Sankorp indicated its intention to purchase the remaining 74% of shares in the South African subsidiary.

=== Australia ===
Plessey operated a manufacturing plant at Meadowbank in Sydney, Australia that made defense equipment and TVs. In the 1970s and 1980s, it produced Ericsson Crossbar Telephone Exchanges under licence for Telecom Australia and the PNG Post and Telegraphs department.

=== GEC takeover bid ===
In December 1985, GEC launched a takeover bid for the Plessey Company, valuing the group at £1.2 billion. Both Plessey and the Ministry of Defence were against the merger, since GEC and Plessey were the two largest suppliers to the MoD and in many tenders the only competitors. In January 1986, the bid was referred to the Monopolies & Mergers Commission (MMC), whose report published in August advised against the merger. The government concurred and blocked GEC's bid.

In 1988, Plessey and GEC merged their telecom units to form GEC Plessey Telecommunications (GPT), at the time the UK's leading telecommunications manufacturer.

=== GEC Siemens takeover ===
In 1988, GEC and Siemens set up a joint holding company, GEC Siemens, to launch a hostile takeover of Plessey. Their initial offer was made on 23 December 1988, valuing Plessey at £1.7 billion. Again, Plessey rejected the offer and again it was referred to the MMC. The original proposal envisaged joint ownership of all of Plessey's defence businesses, with GPT and Plessey's North American businesses split in the ratios 60:40 and 51:49 respectively. The level of GEC's involvement in the Plessey defence businesses was not likely to meet with regulatory approval and in February 1989, GEC Siemens announced a new organisation. In an effort to head off the bid, Plessey announced in May 1989 the closure of its compound semiconductor business in Towcester, Plessey 3-5. The takeover was completed in September 1989.

== Break-up of the business ==
In April 1990, GEC and Siemens agreed a new structure of ownership of the Plessey businesses:

=== GEC acquisitions ===
- In the UK
  - Plessey Aerospace
  - Plessey Avionics
  - Plessey Crypto
  - Plessey Materials
  - Plessey Naval Systems
  - Plessey Semiconductors
  - Plessey Research Caswell
  - Plessey Microsystems
  - Plessey Controls
- In North America
  - Plessey Aero Precision Corp
  - Plessey Dynamics Corp
  - Plessey Electronic Systems Corp (including ES Marine Systems)
  - Sippican
  - Plessey Materials
  - Leigh Instruments

=== Siemens acquisitions ===
- Siemens Plessey Radar
- Siemens Plessey Defence Systems
- Siemens Plessey Controls
- Siemens Plessey Australia
- Siemens Plessey Assessment Services
- Roke Manor Research

=== Jointly owned ===
- GEC Plessey Telecommunications: 60% GEC and 40% Siemens

=== Disposals ===
- Birkby Plastics (1989–1990)
- Hoskyns Group
- Plessey Valdarno S.p.A. (Italy), sold to Magnetek in 1991
- 51% share in Plessey Telenet acquired by minority partner in 1992
- 74% share in Plessey South Africa acquired by minority partner Sankorp

== Subsequent history ==
=== UK ===
In October 1997, British Aerospace and DaimlerChrysler Aerospace acquired the UK operations and the German part of Siemens Plessey Systems, respectively.

By 1997, the GPT name disappeared in the UK and the company was known as Siemens GEC Communication Systems (SGCS), which later became Siemens Communications. In August 1998, GEC acquired Siemens' 40 percent stake in GPT (by now only existing as a legal entity) and merged GPT with the telecoms units of its other subsidiaries, namely Marconi SpA, GEC Hong Kong and ATC South Africa, to form Marconi Communications. In December 1999, GEC's defence arm Marconi Electronic Systems was amalgamated with British Aerospace to form BAE Systems.

The remainder of GEC was renamed to Marconi plc, and Marconi Communications became its principal subsidiary. This company was negatively impacted by the dot-com bubble, and was restructured into Marconi Corporation in 2003. Two years late, the majority of the remaining company (including Marconi Communications) was bought by Ericsson while the remainder became Telent.

The part of GPT which evolved into Siemens Communications would eventually become Siemens Enterprise Communications in 2008.

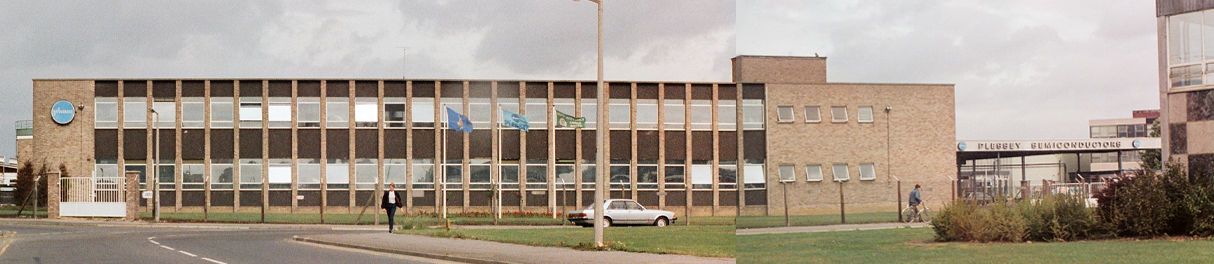
Plessey Semiconductors factory at Cheney Manor, Swindon in 1982. The factory housed both bipolar and MOS lines. A small part of the canteen facilities (which had five grades of service) for all Plessey employees is visible on the right of the image, since demolished around 2010

GEC Plessey Semiconductors (GPS) was purchased by Mitel Semiconductors of Canada in 1998. After a number of downsizes, including the purchase of the power semiconductor and silicon on sapphire operation at Lincoln, Lincolnshire by Dynex Semiconductor in 2000, the company renamed itself Zarlink Semiconductor in 2001. The GPS fabrication plant in Plymouth was acquired by Xfab in March 2002.

=== Plessey Semiconductors Ltd ===
After the sale of the Roborough site in Plymouth to Xfab, the original Plessey Semiconductors site on the Cheney Manor industrial estate at Swindon continued to operate under the Zarlink Semiconductor name until it was sold to MHS Industries in early 2008. In February 2009, the UK business was forced into receivership following the collapse of the parent MHS Electronics business in France. Following the completion of a management buyout, the company traded as Plus-Semi Ltd.

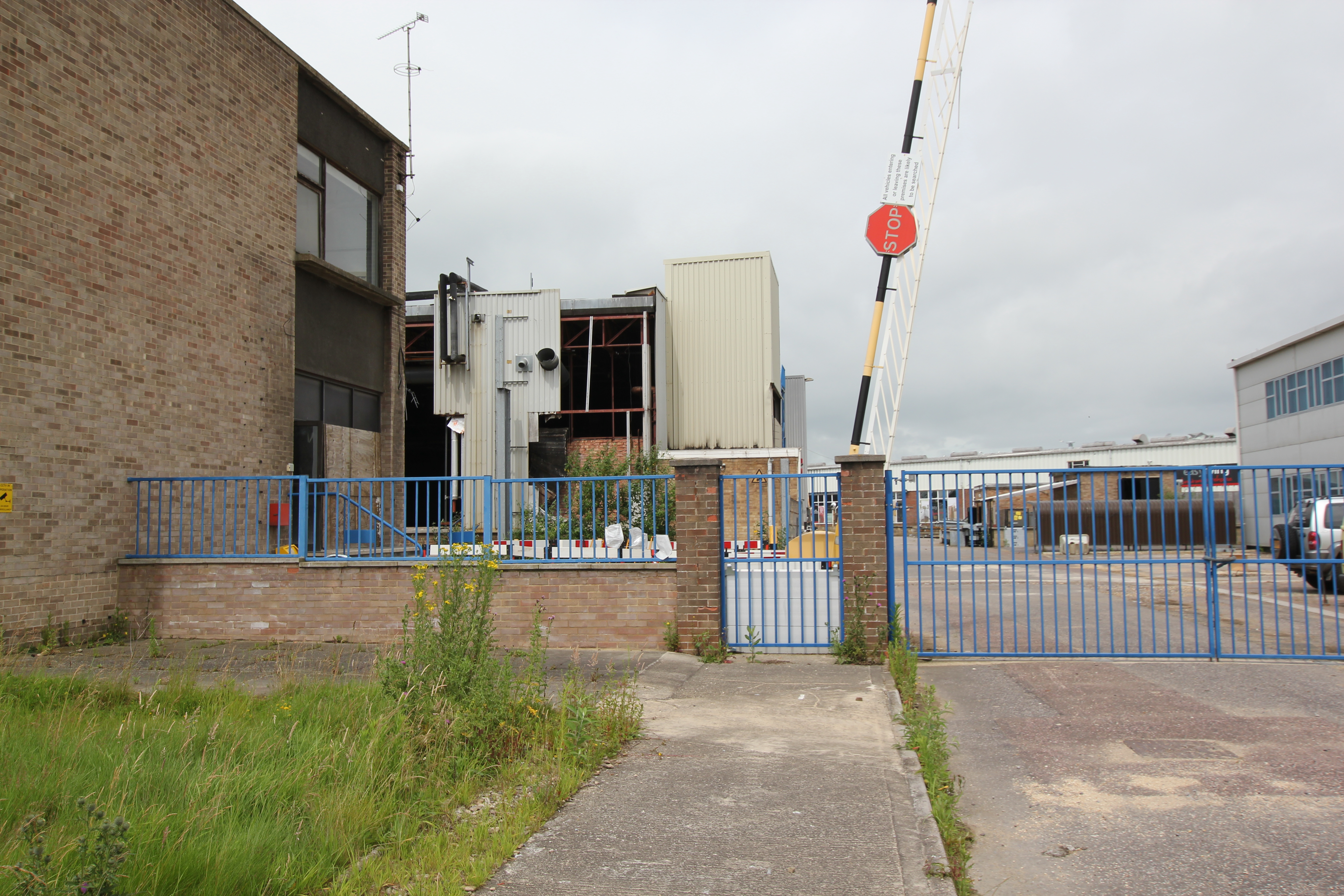
Plessey Semiconductors factory at Cheney Manor, Swindon, on 17 July 2012, undergoing demolition

The Roborough site (8" and 6" lines) was re-acquired from Xfab on 1 January 2010 and the company renamed as Plessey Semiconductors Ltd. The new company transferred its bipolar processes on silicon and SOI into the 8" Plymouth facility during 2010, exploiting the combined technology base in the development of new processes and products in a number of markets. The Swindon site was demolished in July 2012. In 2011/2, Plessey acquired the rights to disruptive GaN-on-silicon technology by acquisition of CamGaN, a startup company, from Cambridge Enterprises.

Using the GaN-on-silicon technology and semiconductor expertise, Plessey Semiconductors Ltd manufactured solid state lighting, horticultural lighting and medical sensing products. Their GaN-on-silicon i2LED high power LEDs and Stellar Orion beam forming modules, launched in autumn 2016, enabled new form factors of lighting products and removed design constraints for lighting product designers. In horticulture, the Plessey Attis Growlight was at the forefront of an engineering approach to LED-based plant grow lights which was developed into a new brand, Hyperion Grow Lights. The company's medical products based on the EPIC sensor were used in the advanced portable ECG monitoring device, Impulse, and was also the basis of an R&D program, named Warden, to develop driver alertness monitoring devices in automotive and aeronautical applications.

In 2017, Plessey pivoted the focus of the business to the R&D and manufacturing of microLEDs (micro light-emitting diodes) as a market disrupting display technology for a wide range of applications, including augmented reality, mixed reality, smartphones, televisions, smartwatches, head-up displays, and head-mounted displays.

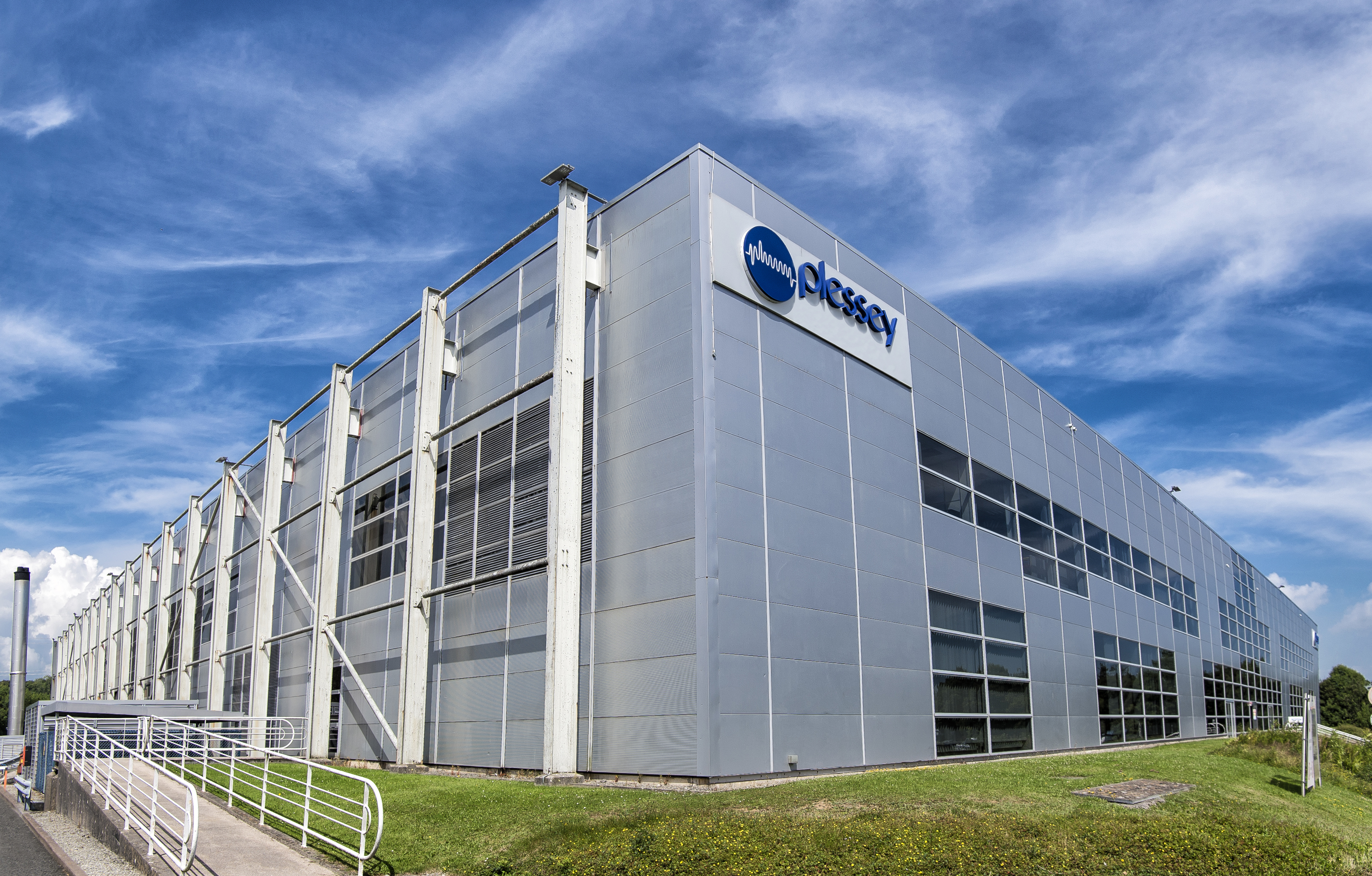
Plessey Semiconductors headquarters in Roborough, Plymouth in 2017

Plessey continues to operate in the Roborough site with 150mm and 200mm wafer processing facilities to undertake design, test and assembly of products, and a suite of photonic characterisation and applications laboratories.

Their original microLED product was an illuminator for display light engines (DMD and LCOS), which offered a 40% reduction in light engine size whilst delivering higher energy efficiency. Later full-field emissive microLED displays combine high-density RGB pixel arrays with high-performance CMOS backplanes to produce high-brightness, low-power and high-frame-rate image sources. These innovative products have been recognised within the industry, receiving awards including the Elektra Awards 2017, British Engineering Excellence Awards 2017, National Technology Awards 2018, CES Innovation Awards 2019 and Electronics Industry Awards 2019.

In March 2019, Plessey used their GaN-on-silicon technology, which natively emits blue, to engineer the early layers within the process to emit native green, opening more opportunities for markets such as military applications. Plessey also achieved the world's first GaN-on-silicon monolithic wafer-to-wafer bonding.

In August 2025, Plessey Semiconductors was acquired by Haylo Labs, using funding from Chinese AI smartglasses manufacturer Goertek Inc. The acquisition was given national security clearance after a review under the National Security and Investment Act 2021.

=== South Africa ===
In South Africa, following the successful GEC/Siemens takeover, after protracted negotiations in 1991, Plessey South Africa became a wholly owned subsidiary of Sankorp under the new name of Plessey Tellumat South Africa Limited (PTSA). The addition of the name Tellumat had a double symbolism, firstly for the company's commitment to exports, as it is the name of its UK-based export subsidiary. Secondly, the name derives from the Tellurometer, South Africa's world first electronic surveying development—and by implication, a commitment to ongoing electronic research and development.

PTSA continued to grow with a strong focus on telecommunications and defence products, particularly with a major expansion into large projects, rolling out the microwave backbone of MTN, one of South Africa's first GSM cellular networks and the installation of a fibre optic network and radio broadcasting system in Malaysia. A software division was formed through the acquisition of BSW data, largely staffed by engineers from the recently terminated South African space programme in which PTSA had also participated, both in the electronics of the launch vehicle and the satellite itself.

1995 was a landmark year in the history of the business in South Africa. The merger of PTSA and Tek Electronics, the consumer electronics audio and video products, manufacturer and distributor, (also wholly owned by Sankorp) took the business full circle back to its consumer electronics roots. This resulted in the renaming of PTSA back to the original name of Plessey South Africa Limited. The full acquisition of AWA-Plessey Communications, which Plessey jointly owned in Australia with Amalgamated Wireless (Australasia) Ltd (AWA) and had a similar product portfolio, resulted in penetration into the Pacific Rim market. The culmination of this growth was the company's listing on the Johannesburg Stock Exchange (JSE) as the Plessey Corporation in the same year. Trading started off at R4.80 a share. On the evening of 6 February 1996, a devastating fire swept through two bays of the White Road factory in Retreat, Cape Town causing huge damage to stock, instruments, plant and work in progress. No one was injured, but work was disrupted for several weeks. Large sections of the factory had to be rebuilt.

At the end of 1996, Plessey Corporation sold off the Sales and marketing business of Telefunken, Pioneer and Satellite TV.

In August 1998, Plessey Corporation was bought by Dimension Data Holdings and Worldwide African Investment Holdings for R1.6 billion. The new owners retained BSW Data, Plessey Solutions and Communications Systems. The remaining divisions, notably with a product development and manufacturing focus, were bought back by a combined management buyout supported by Rand Merchant Bank. The corporate name was changed to Tellumat Pty Ltd. Tellumat continues to develop and manufacture Plessey-branded products as before and operates in the defence, telecommunications and contract manufacturing markets.

== Plessey barcodes ==
"123456E" encoded in a Plessey barcode

The name is also used to refer to a barcode symbology developed by Plessey, which is still used in some libraries and for shelf tags in retail stores, in part as a solution to their internal requirement for stock control. The system was first used in the early 1970s by J.Sainsbury to identify all of its products on supermarket shelves for its product restocking system. The chief advantages are the relative ease of printing using the dot-matrix printers, which were popular at the time of the code's introduction, and its somewhat higher density than the more common 2 of 5 and 3 of 9 codes.

Plessey barcodes use two bar widths. Whitespace between bars is not significant. The start element is a wide bar, and the stop element is two narrow bars. In between, the bars are in groups of four. High order bars appear leftmost. Narrow bars are 0 and wide bars are 1.

This symbology is not self checking, though a modulo 10 or modulo 11 checksum (or some combination of both checksums, depending on application) is usually appended.
