= List of companies based in Austin, Texas =

This is a list of notable companies based in the Austin metropolitan area.

== Fortune 500 ==
(rankings as of 2021)

- Dell Technologies (28)
- Oracle (80)
- Tesla Inc. (100)

== Advertising ==
- Door Number 3
- GSD&M
- LatinWorks
- McGarrah Jessee
- R/GA
- RetailMeNot
- Rock Candy Media
- T3 (The Think Tank)

== Aerospace and air travel ==
- Astrotech Corporation

== Architecture ==
- Dick Clark Architecture
- Lundgren and Maurer-Closed in the 80s no successor
- Reclaimed Space

== Automotive ==
- Tesla

== Beauty ==
- Beardbrand
- Birds Barbershop

== Biotechnology ==
- Luminex Corporation

== Booksellers and publishing ==
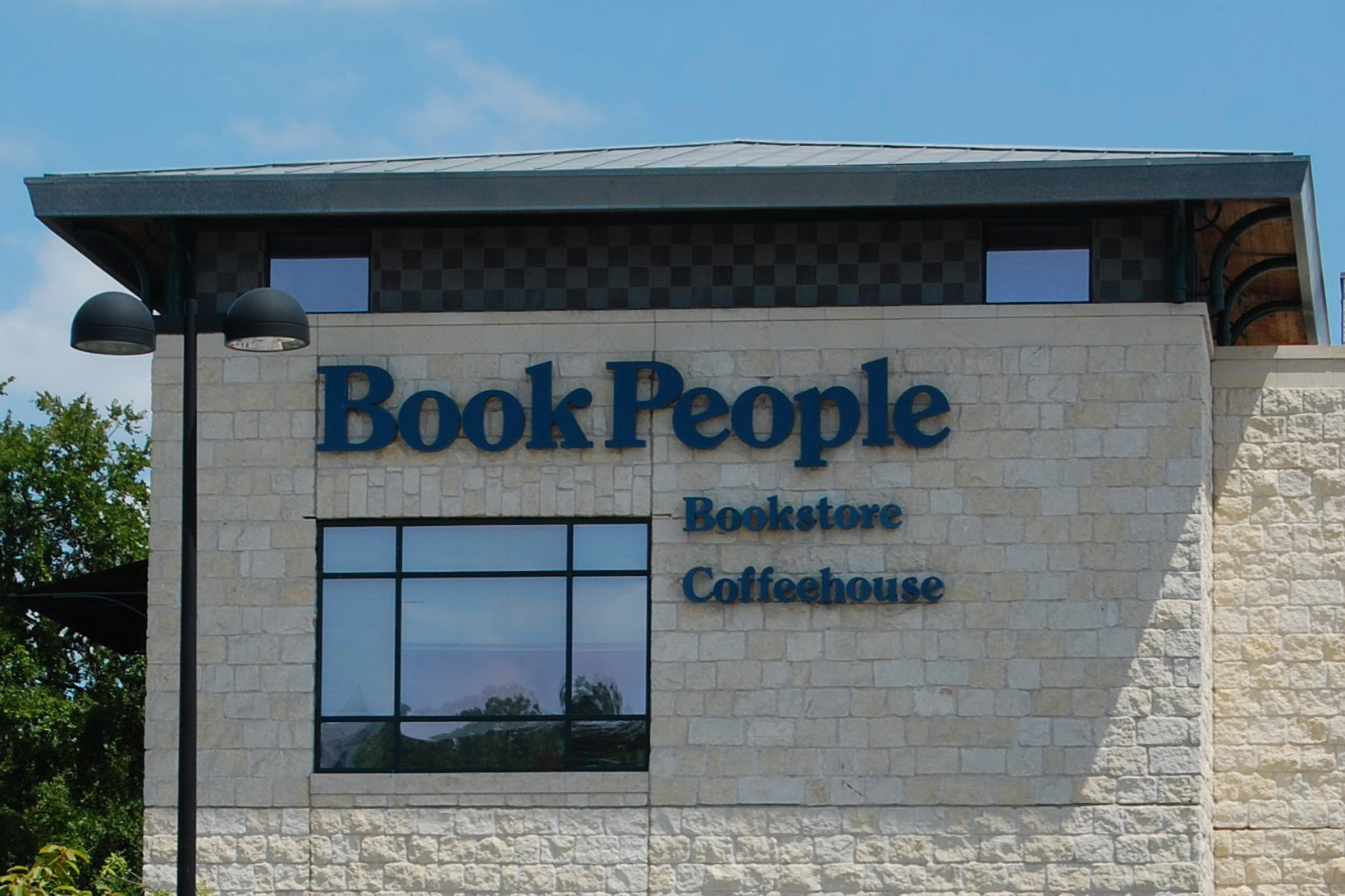
BookPeople store at Sixth and Lamar in Austin

- BookPeople
- Greenleaf Book Group
- Holt McDougal
- Landes Bioscience
- Monofonus Press
- Steve Jackson Games

== Construction ==
- The Boring Company

== Data ==
- Forcepoint
- Global Language Monitor
- Hoover's
- NetSolve (Cisco Systems)
- Vignette Corporation (Open Text Corporation)- Headquartered in Canada

== Direct marketing ==
- QuantumDigital

== Education ==
- MakerSquare
- University of Texas at Austin
- St. Edward's University

== Energy ==
- Crystatech
- Green Mountain Energy
- Illumitex

== Environmental monitoring ==
- VI Technology-Acquired by Aeroflex

== Film and television ==
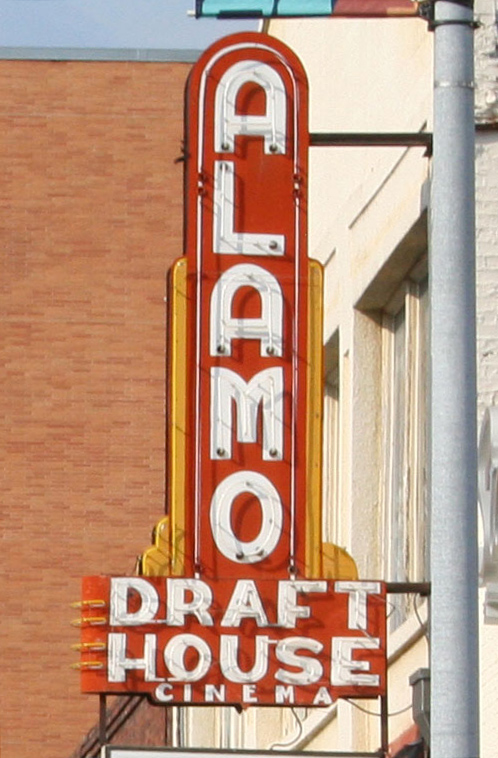
Sign for the original Alamo Drafthouse Cinema in Downtown Austin

- Alamo Drafthouse Cinema
- Bright Shining City Productions
- FloSports
- Troublemaker Studios
- Uptown Studios Austin
- Shop LC

== Finance and banking ==
- Dimensional Fund Advisors
- Farm Credit Bank of Texas
- Vista Equity Partners

== Food and drink ==
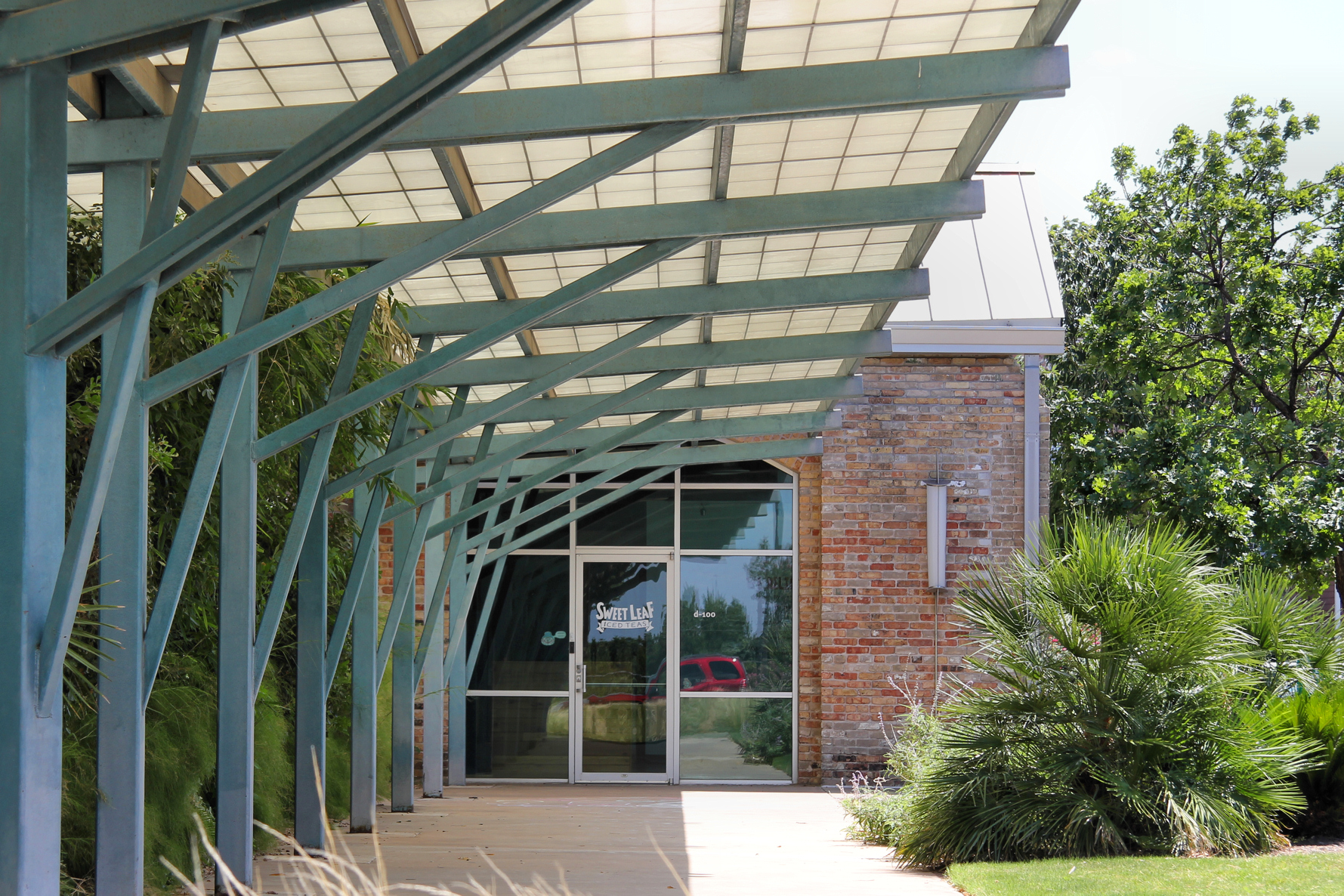
Entrance to Sweet Leaf Tea Company in Penn Field Business Park

- Amy's Ice Creams
- Carino's Italian
- Chameleon Cold-Brew
- Chuy's
- Deep Eddy Vodka
- DoubleDave's Pizzaworks
- Gatti's Pizza - Relocated to Fort Worth before shutdown
- KaleidoScoops
- Live Oak Brewing Company
- The Oasis on Lake Travis
- P. Terry's
- Siete Foods
- Sweet Leaf Tea Company
- Tiff's Treats
- Tito's Vodka
- Torchys Tacos
- Whole Foods Market
- YETI Coolers

== Gaming development, distribution and production ==
- Arkane Studios
- Aspyr
- BattleCry Studios
- Bluepoint Games
- Certain Affinity
- Devolver Digital
- GameSalad
- Heatwave Interactive
- KingsIsle Entertainment
- Powerhouse Animation Studios, Inc.
- Retro Studios
- Rooster Teeth Games
- Roxor Games
- Spacetime Studios
- Twisted Pixel Games

== Insurance ==
- National Western Life

== Intelligence ==
- Stratfor

== Internet service providers ==
- Wayport, Inc., acquired by AT&T in 2008

== Loans ==
- EZCorp

== Manufacturing ==
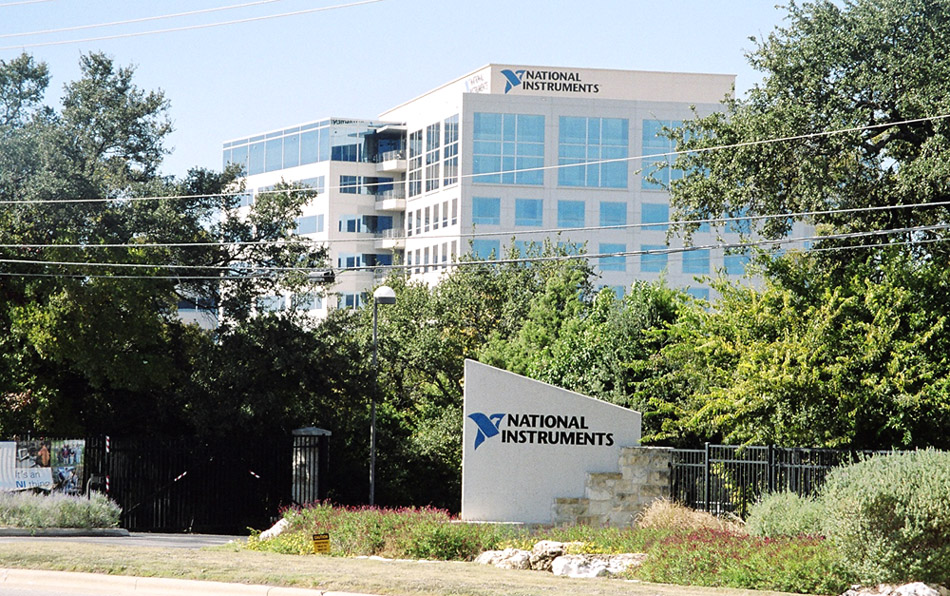
National Instruments campus in Austin

- Cerilliant Corporation
- Elgin-Butler Brick Company
- IKey
- Magpul Industries
- Motion Computing
- National Instruments
- SuperCircuits
- Tesla
- Valence Technology

== Medical ==
- Ben's Friends

== Music ==
- Collings Guitars
- Emperor Jones
- Waterloo Records
- Western Vinyl

== Non-governmental organizations (NGOs) ==
- Bat Conservation International
- Knowbility

== Real estate ==
- American Campus Communities
- Econohomes
- Keller Williams Realty

== Retail ==
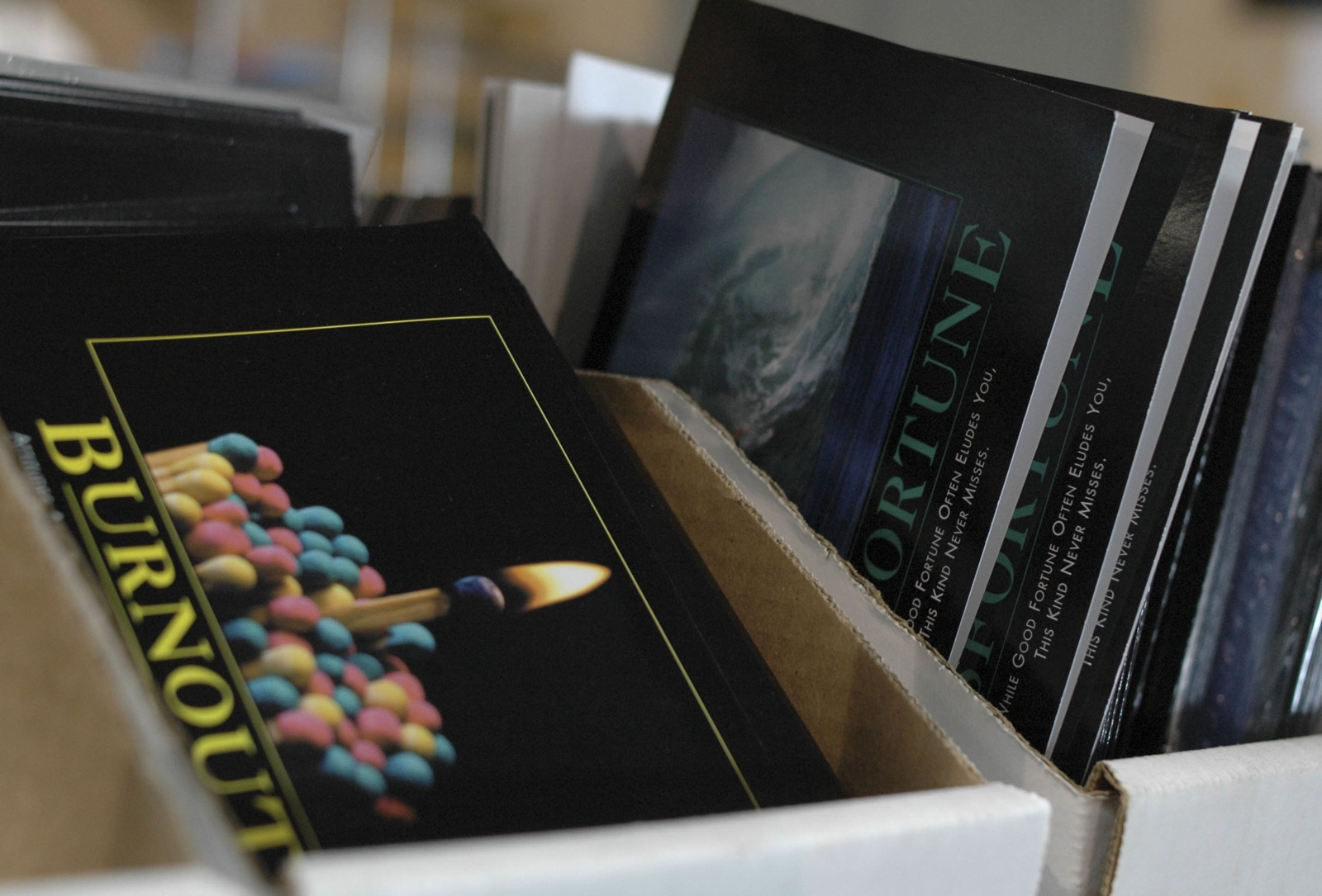
Merchandise inside Despair, Inc.'s Austin warehouse

- Allens Boots
- Despair, Inc.
- Eyebuydirect
- Flying Eyes Optics
- Kendra Scott
- L.G. Balfour Company
- Living Direct
- Outdoor Voices
- Tecovas
- TicketCity
- Whole Foods Market, a division of Amazon

== Security ==
- Knight Security Systems

== Semiconductors ==
- Advanced Technology Development Facility
- Cirrus Logic
- NXP Semiconductors
- Silicon Laboratories

== Shipping ==
- uShip

== Software ==
- Academic Superstore
- Asure Software
- Bazaarvoice
- BigCommerce
- Convio
- Enthought
- Honestech
- Indeed.com
- Meta SaaS
- Oracle Corporation
- Pervasive Software-Acquired by Actian
- Planview
- Pristine
- Realtor.com
- SolarWinds
- Spiceworks
- Spredfast
- Third Wire
- Ticketbud
- Trilogy
- Vrbo
- Winternals
- X Corp.
- Xojo
- Zello

== Space ==
- SpaceX

== Telecommunications ==
- Janet TV
- LifeSize

== Utilities ==
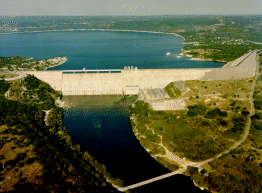
The Lower Colorado River Authority generates electricity from the Mansfield Dam.

- Lower Colorado River Authority

== See also ==
- Silicon Hills
