= Despair, Inc. =

- Company type: Private
- Founded: 1998
- Headquarters: Austin, Texas, US
- Area served: International
- Key people: E.L. Kersten, Ph.D. (co-founder)
- Products: "Demotivators": Posters, calendars, misc.
- Website: despair.com

Despair, Inc is a company based in Austin, Texas, that produces posters and souvenirs that satirize the motivational indoctrination common in corporate environments.

They are known for their cynical and ironic "Demotivator" items, which parody the grandiose imagery and solemn language of Successories, a range of motivational products. Examples:

- MEETINGS: None of us is as dumb as all of us.
- BLAME: The secret to success is knowing who to blame for your failures.
- DREAMS: Dreams are like rainbows. Only idiots chase them.

On the company website, each "Demotivator" is followed by a list of individuals who the company feels would be a perfect candidate for the item (this does not apply to all their offerings). A running gag is that the category "Disaffected College Students" (or a variant thereof) is included as the last candidate in most listings.

== Other works ==
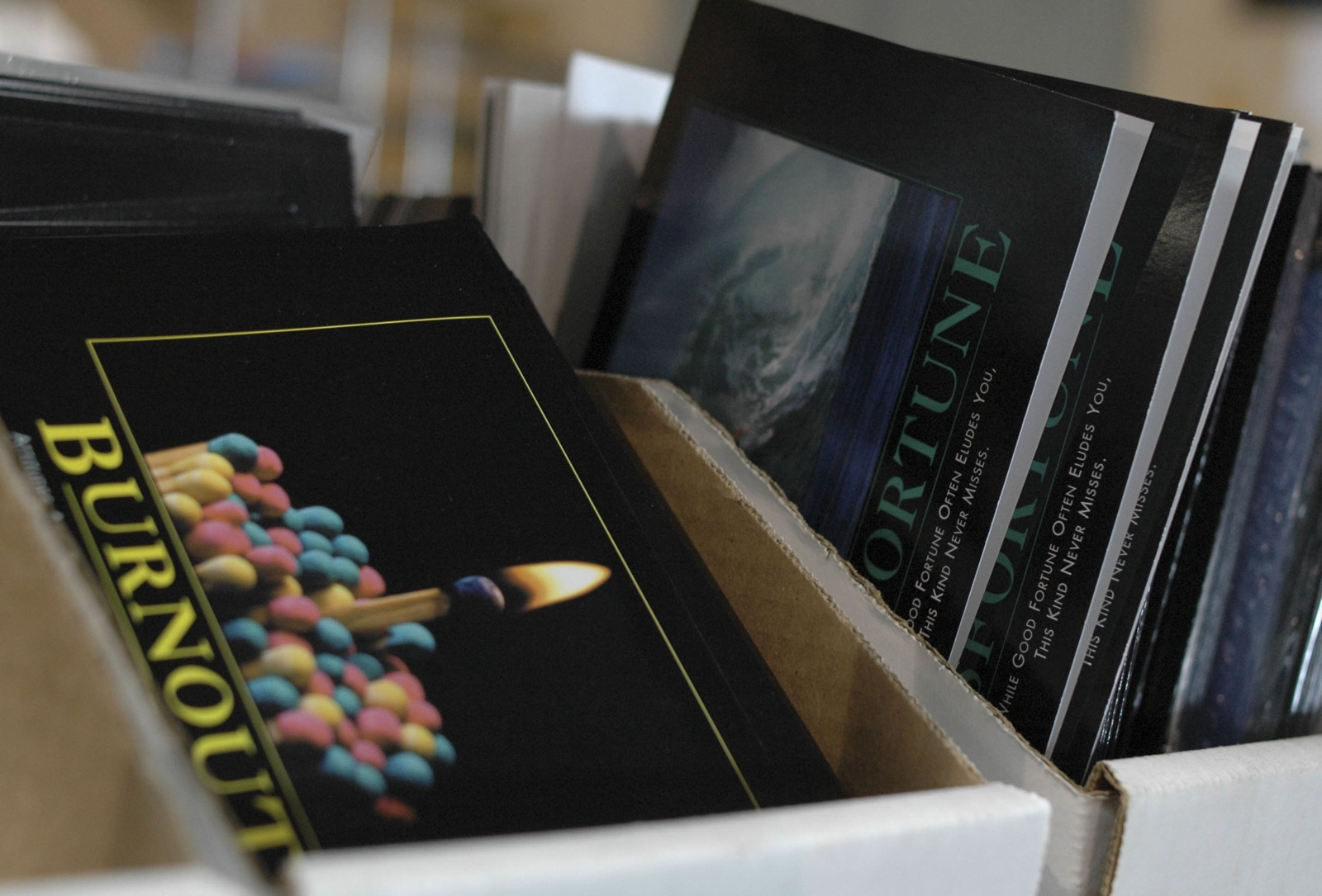
Merchandise inside Despair, Inc.'s Austin warehouse

In 2000, Despair, Inc. obtained a registered trademark in the US for the familiar frowny emoticon :-( when used on "greeting cards, posters and art prints". In 2001, they issued a satirical press release, announcing that they would sue "anyone and everyone who uses the so-called 'frowny' emoticon, or our trademarked logo, in their written email correspondence. Ever."

Despair published The Art of Demotivation by E.L. Kersten, Ph.D., a former professor of organizational communication and company co-founder, in 2005. It is a spoof of the management guru book genre and features 18 stylized renderings of Demotivators to illustrate the points. The book comes in three editions including a $1,195.00 Chairman edition. In 2004, the Harvard Business Review published a serious essay on the nature of work and self-fulfillment by Kersten: "Let Me Take You Down".

== See also ==
- Demotywatory.pl, a Polish entertainment website devoted to satire, including a comprehensive collection of demotivational posters
- Life Is Good, a lifestyle brand best known for its optimistic T-shirts and merchandise
