= Sweetleaf =

Sweetleaf may refer to:

- Sauropus androgynus, a plant of the family Phyllanthaceae whose leaves may be used as a potherb
- Stevia, a genus of plants in the family Asteraceae whose leaves may be used for sweetening
- SweetLeaf Living Foods, an Australian Tea Company based in Kuranda, Queensland
- "Sweet Leaf", a song by Black Sabbath
- Sweet Leaf Tea Company, US manufacturer of prepared tea drinks
- Symplocos tinctoria, an evergreen shrub or small tree in the southeastern United States
- Monarda fistulosa, a medicinal and ornamental herb
- Slang term for Cannabis
