= Demotywatory.pl =

Polish entertainment website

- Website type: Entertainment service
- Available in: Polish
- Owner: JoeMonster.org
- Creator: Mariusz Składowski
- Website: Official website
- Current status: active

Demotywatory.pl is a Polish entertainment website devoted to satire, including a comprehensive collection of demotivational posters and content on Polish politics. It is a user-generated content host where users can submit, rate and comment on pictures.

In March 2011 Demotywatory.pl was the 1807th website in the global Alexa ranking, and 25th in Poland. In March 2011 and 2012 it was the most popular Polish website for humorous content according to research by Megapanel PBI/Gemius. In August 2011 it was reported to have 4 million visits per month from Poles.

== See also ==
- Despair, Inc.
