= BookPeople =

Bookstore in Austin, TX

Coordinates: 30.2718°N 97.7529°W

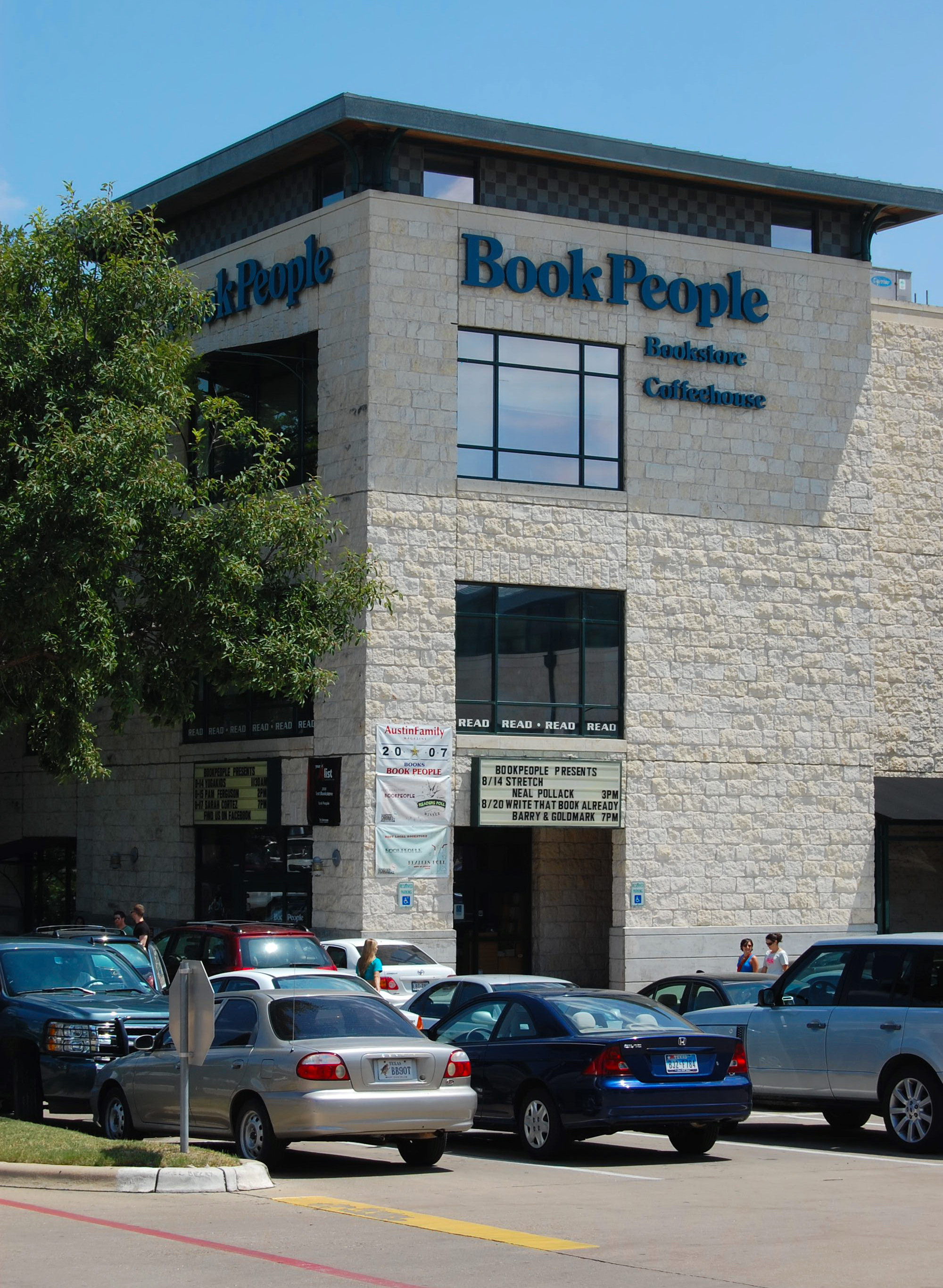
BookPeople store at Sixth & Lamar

BookPeople is an independent bookstore in Austin, Texas, and the largest bookstore in the state of Texas. It was founded in 1970 and has been voted the best bookstore by the Austin Chronicle every year since 1996 as of 2026.

BookPeople was voted Publishers Weekly's "Bookseller of the Year". It is a member of the Austin Independent Business Alliance. It is also a member of the American Booksellers Association.

== History ==
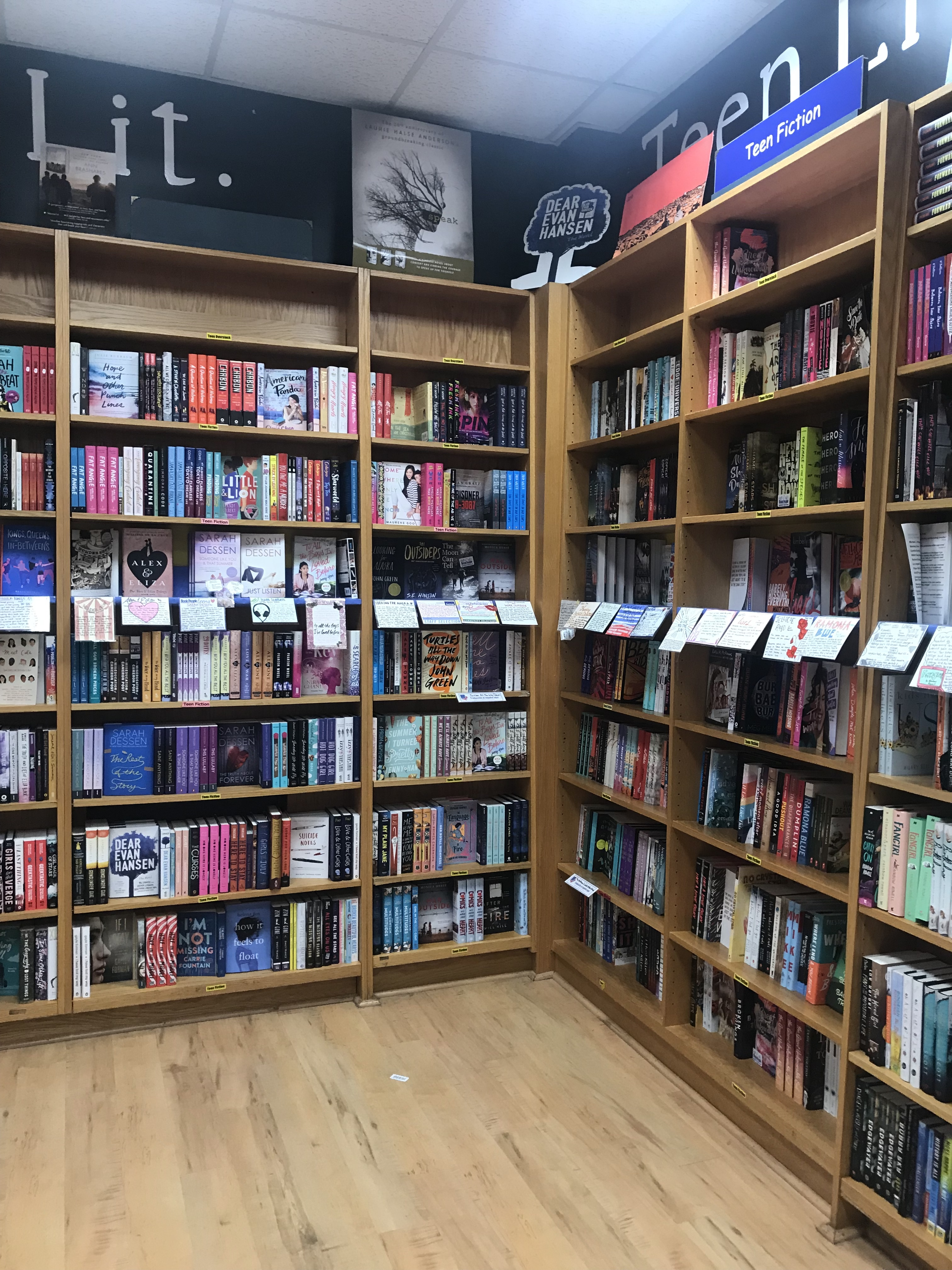
BookPeople's Teen Literature section

BookPeople was founded in 1970 by Michael Nill and originally named Grok Books in reference to Stranger in a Strange Land by Robert A. Heinlein. Ownership was transferred to Philip Sansone, who renamed the store BookPeople in reference to Fahrenheit 451 by Ray Bradbury in 1984, when the store moved locations. In 2018, the store employees formed a union, BookPeople United, under the auspices of the Office and Professional Employees International Union (OPEIU) Local 277. Their first contract was ratified in January 2021.

On April 3, 2025, BookPeople United unanimously approved a new collective bargaining agreement that prohibited the use of artificial intelligence to replace employees or positions.

Charley Rejsek became BookPeople’s chief executive officer in 2022, after serving as general manager for three years. She left BookPeople on August 31, 2025. As of September 2026, Gregory Day served as the store’s general manager.

=== Book-rating litigation ===
In July 2023, BookPeople was among the plaintiffs in a federal lawsuit challenging Texas House Bill 900, which required vendors to rate books supplied to public schools according to their sexual content. On October 21, 2025, a federal judge issued a permanent injunction against enforcement of the challenged book-rating requirements. Texas Commissioner of Education Mike Morath appealed the ruling on October 30, 2025.

== See also ==
- List of companies based in Austin, Texas
