= Rock Candy Media =

American marketing firm and advertising agency

- Logo
- Founded: 2009 in Austin, Texas
- Founder: Annie Liao Jones
- Headquarters: 5900 Balcones Drive #205, Austin, Texas 78731, U.S.
- Key people: Annie Liao Jones; (CEO); Stephanie Christoffers; (Chief operations manager)
- Revenue: $1.16 million (2016)
- Website: rockcandymedia.com

Rock Candy Media (RCM) is a marketing firm based in Austin, Texas, in the United States.

== History ==
Rock Candy Media (RCM) is a full-service digital marketing and interactive advertising agency based in Austin, Texas. The company was founded in 2009 by Annie Liao Jones, who continues to serve as its chief executive officer (CEO). In addition to advertising and marketing consultation, RCM offers full service communications, marketing strategy, press releases, print and web design, print consultation and vendor sourcing. In 2011, RCM launched an online marketing division to expand its portfolio of services, including custom affiliate marketing, email marketing, online pay per click marketing, search engine optimization, social media marketing, and online mobile app creation.

By 2012, RCM's staff included a creative director, two designers, a social media manager, a copywriter, and a developer. That year, the Austin-based content management consultancy DigitHaus named RCM the design agency for its app division, and Sirena Water Wear named RCM its agency of record to promote a line of tailored shorts geared for fishing. The clothing retailer Port Aransas and Austin Wine and Cider also named RCM their agency of record in 2012. RCM designed KnowBuddy, survey software used with social media platforms, in 2013.

In 2014, RCM created a video called "Workin' at IKEA", in which employees worked from inside an IKEA store. The company moved to a single, 1,000-square-foot office space at Balcones Drive and MoPac Expressway in North Austin in 2015 to accommodate its video production department and increased staff of nine employees. The company confirmed Austin Area Birthing Center, Dobie Center, Realty Austin, and TekSavers as clients and projected $600,000 in revenue based on its first quarter performance. In August, the San Antonio-based video production company Geomedia expanded into Austin, sharing office space with RCM. RCM confirmed plans to open an additional office in Los Angeles in 2016.

In mid 2017, Jones was named one of Austin Business Journal's "Profiles in Power" nominees. RCM was among the 50 fastest-growing companies based in Austin, as of 2017. In September, the Austin Business Journal featured RCM in their profile on diversity within Austin's technology companies. The publication noted Jones' Taiwanese-American heritage, and reported that of RCM's 39 employees (37 in Austin and 2 in Los Angeles) at the time, "about two-thirds are white, a quarter are Hispanic or Latino and the rest are Asian". Austin Business Journal also reported that RCM has worked with consumer apps, e-commerce, cybersecurity, and information technology companies, and said the company's revenue grew from $541,186 in 2014 to $1,162,810 in 2016, representing a 115 percent increase.

The company's other clients have included Alexander Cole & Associates, ArthroCare, Austin Cancer Centers, Austin Urology Institute, Baldirama Restaurant Group, Bennett Flaherty PLLC, ContactWorks, RVRhino, and SugarPaper Press.

=== Rock Candy Life ===
In 2010, RCM launched a sister retail company and lifestyle brand called Rock Candy Life (RCL). RCL began selling a line of environmentally-friendly shower curtains made from PVC-free vinyl. The recyclable, biodegradable curtain began retailing for $25 and was intended to be the first product in a line of bathroom accessories. In April 2013, Austin Business Journal reported that Jones invested $50,000 to launch RCL, which earned $5,500 in 2010 and $40,000 in 2012 (a 627 percent increase). That same month, Upstart Business Journal named Jones one of its five "Entrepreneurs of the Week" for running RCM and launching RCL. Despite the product's success, RCL was shut down by the end of 2014.
