= Knight Security Systems =

Former security device company in Texas

- Company type: Private
- Industry: Security
- Founded: 1983
- Founder: Phil Lake
- Headquarters: Austin, Texas
- Area served: Worldwide
- Website: knightsecurity.com

Knight Security Systems, LLC was acquired by MCA in 2022. During its operation the company sold physical security devices and was headquartered in Austin, Texas with offices in Lubbock, Dallas, Houston, San Antonio, Corpus Christi, and McAllen. Its president was Phil Lake.

== Overview ==
Knight Security Systems was founded in 1983. The company's security solutions include access control, video surveillance, and intrusion as well as fire detection systems.

In 2009, Knight Security secured a $12.5 million contract with Texas Department of Aging and Disability Services (DADS) to install over 3,200 high-definition video surveillance camera systems in 335 buildings at 12 state school campuses.

In 2015, Knight was awarded a contract with the Texas Lottery for over $100,000.

In September 2022, Knight was acquired by MCA.

== Compliance ==
Knight and its staff hold industry certifications in the Texas Department of Public Safety's Private Security Bureau License, State of Texas TXMAS, and the State of Texas DIR.

== See also ==
- List of companies based in Austin, Texas
