= Perlorian =

Japanese cat photography brand

Perlorian, also Nameneko (なめ猫), Namennayo, and Don't Pelorian!, are a brand name encompassing images of cats by Japanese photographer Satoru Tsuda and various spinoff merchandise. Perlorian photographs feature real cats dressed in clothing and arranged in cat-sized dioramas so they appear to be doing human activities such as camping, going to school, or playing in a rock band. Some of the first Perlorian images featured cats involved in juvenile delinquent behaviour, such as smoking in a bathroom and being in a motorcycle gang. At its height in the early 1980s, Perlorian cats appeared on over 500 different pieces of merchandise.

== Nameneko: a Japanese fad ==
Photographer Satoru Tsuda originally did not like cats, but in 1979 he took in four tiny kittens he had found abandoned at a dry cleaner's shop near his home, taking care of them just as a mother cat would. After a few months he noticed one of them ("Matakichi", named after the dry cleaning business in which he was found) playing with some doll clothes, and the idea for Perlorian was born. The first item was a poster of Matakichi dressed as a motorcycle gang member with the slogan "All Japan Fast Feline Federation — You Won't Lick Us!". The poster went on to sell 8 million copies and launched a craze for more items. Hundreds of items would be released in a short time, including novelty fake IDs, underwear, and a handheld video game. Like most fads the initial craze dissipated quickly, but Namennayo items are still being produced and in 2010 the brand celebrated its 30th anniversary.

== Perlorian in North America ==
Marketed as Perlorian in the United States, Tsuda's cat merchandise was popular for a time in the mid-1980s but never reached the heights it had in Japan. Perlorian items for the US market included a series of four children's books with text by Suzanne Green and a 1983 set of trading cards by Topps. Internet humour site I-Mockery named the card set among the worst trading cards ever created. Fotofolio published another wave of Perlorian postcards circa 2004.

== Bibliography ==
- Perlorian Seasons (1987)
- Perlorian Busy Day (1987)
- Perlorian Going to School (1987)
- Perlorian Birthday Book (1987)

== See also ==
- The Adventures of T-Rex, a cartoon show with character design by Tsuda
- Hang in there, Baby
- Lolcats
