= Reclaimed Space =

American company based in Austin, Texas, United States

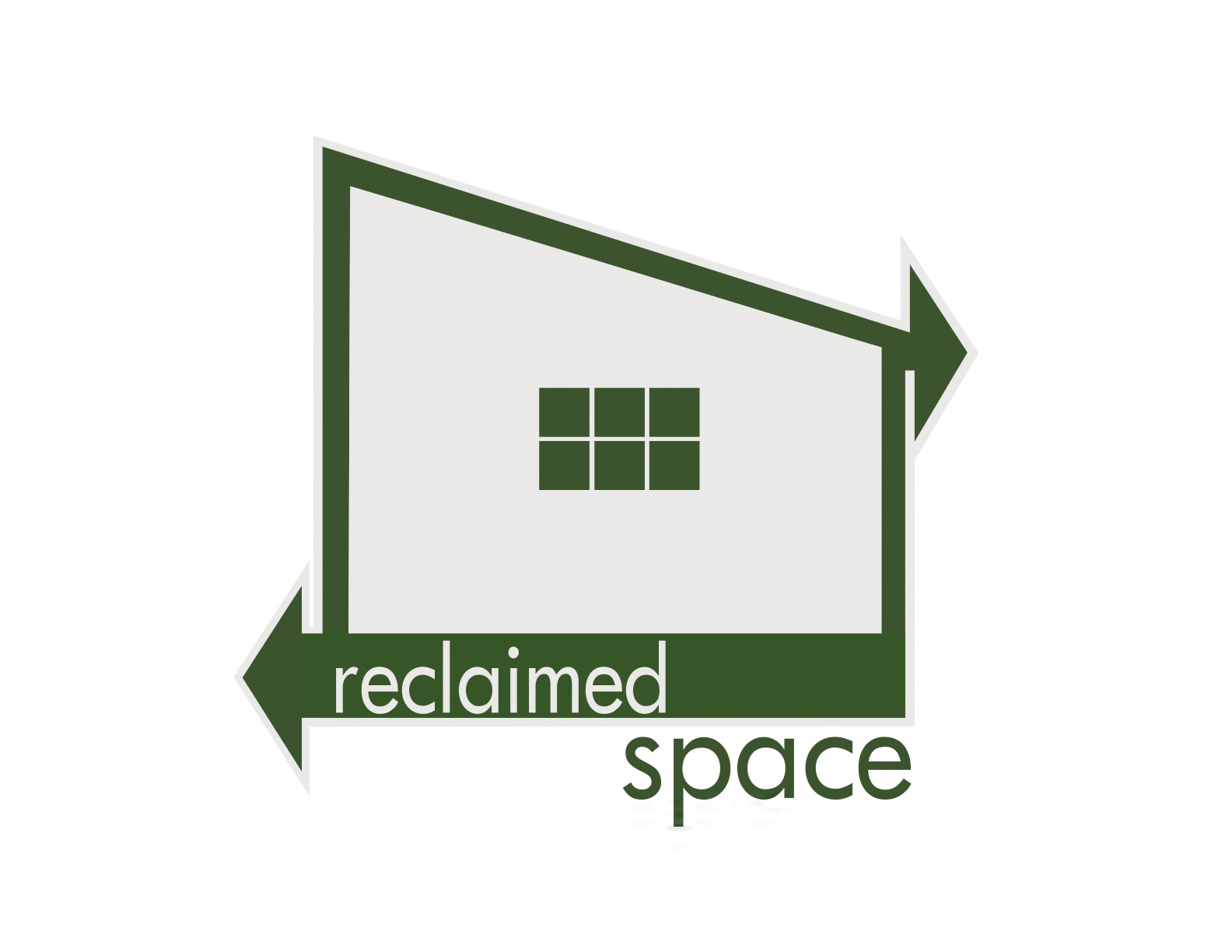
- Company type: Private
- Industry: Green Building; Sustainable architecture
- Founded: 2008 (Austin, Texas)
- Headquarters: Austin, Texas
- Website: reclaimedspace.com

Reclaimed Space is an American company based in Austin, Texas, that builds custom sustainable living spaces out of reclaimed materials. They are known for their relocatable and drop-ready functionality. Reclaimed Space's architecture is also known for its solar/wind energy capabilities and rainwater harvesting systems. Off-grid living is one of Reclaimed Space's main functionalities.

Reclaimed Spaces can function as guest homes, offices, cabins, and have been noted for their affordable housing alternative as well as Cohousing and intentional community designs.

== See also ==
- List of companies based in Austin, Texas
