= QuantumDigital =

Company in Austin, Texas, United States

QuantumDigital, Inc.
- Type: Privately held company
- Industry: Direct Marketing
- Founded: Austin, Texas (1986) (as "Austin Quantum Systems, Inc.").
- Founder: Jim Damman
- Headquarters: Austin, Texas; United States
- Area served: USA, Canada
- Key people: Steve Damman; President & CEO; Freddie Baird; Executive VP & COO; Eric Cosway; Executive VP & CMO; J. Chris Anderson; VP & CTO; Angela McMurray; VP Administration
- Services: Direct mail Print on demand eMarketing
- Number of employees: 100 (2010)
- Website: quantumdigital.com

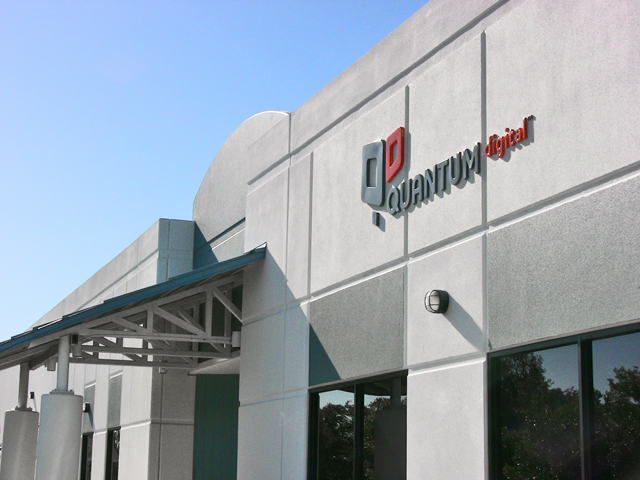
QuantumDigital, Inc. corporate headquarters in Austin, Texas

QuantumDigital, Inc., is a company based in Austin, Texas. It was founded in 1986 as Quantum Systems. QuantumDigital was one of the first companies in the U.S. to launch an electronic ordering system, called Q-Direct, for the direct mail industry. The Q-Direct client software was distributed on physical CD-ROM media. Orders were placed via modem connection from the customer's computer to the company's server.

The company was founded by Jim Damman. Initially, Damman used a dot matrix printer and sheets of offset-printed card stock to meet the direct mail needs of real estate professionals, having held a career in real estate himself for several years. Steve Damman, Jim Damman's son and current President/CEO, joined the company in 1992. The dot matrix printer was subsequently replaced by laser printers. In addition to its flagship product—a "Jumbo" postcard—the company offered a specialized business-reply mailer format to a few of its customers, including its highest-volume customer at the time, Weichert, Realtors.

The company's Jumbo postcard, or "Quantumcard" as it came to be known, featured a real estate agent's photo, company logo, contact information and a brief message on the address side of the card. Quantumcards could be mailed to almost any residential address in the United States, either from a customer-provided mailing list or a list generated by the company, which could then be further refined to mail to a single street, a neighborhood area or an entire zip code as specified by the customer.

== Timeline and overview ==
In late 1997, the company acquired their first color printer—the Xerox Docucolor 40. This enabled the company to offer color personalization on the address side of the card.

In 1999, the company changed its name to QuantumMail.com and launched a new web site which featured an improved online ordering system. Support for Q-Direct continued until nearly all of QuantumMail.com's customers had switched over to the online ordering system. Q-Direct was officially shut down in late 1999. By this time, the company had expanded its product line to include panoramic postcards and mailed flyers. In addition to its direct mail products and services, the company started a print and ship division called QuantumCopy.com (later re-branded as QuantumPrint). Initial product offerings included flyers, bookmarks and brochures.

In late 2002, the company launched an online design utility which gave customers the ability to customize both sides of their postcards and other marketing pieces.

In May 2003, the company introduced two new services, “My Quantumcard” and “My Library”, which allowed customers to create, save and edit their marketing pieces.

In October 2004, QuantumMail.com received a printing milestone award from Xerox corporation for having printed more than four million pieces in a single month with a pair of Xerox iGen3 printers.

In early 2006, the company changed its name to QuantumDirect to reflect that the company was more than just a provider of direct mail services. The purpose for this was twofold; First, it served as a name under which the company could better seek out enterprise-level business opportunities and, second, it created an entity under which both the direct mail and print & ship divisions would operate. By this time in its history, QuantumDigital was experiencing rapid growth, printing approximately 6 million direct-mail pieces every month for independent real estate companies and franchise organizations, small businesses and enterprise-level corporations.

In December 2007, QuantumDirect announced a new brand and company name, QuantumDigital, to better describe the innovations in the digital direct marketing world. This strategy also included combining all three of the company's former brands into one.

In 2008, QuantumDigital launched a completely redesigned web site and announced the addition of e-mail marketing to their list of services. 2008 also marked the launch of MapMail, an online tool which allows customers to specify a geographic area using Google Maps technology to send mailings to postal recipients within the specified area. In May 2008, QuantumDigital donated print services and was a premier sponsor of "Uncorked"—an annual fundraiser organized by Mobile Loaves & Fishes, a non-profit organization which provides assistance to the homeless and working poor. On November 24, 2008, QuantumDigital launched its official blog "The Direct Marketing Voice."

In 2010, QuantumDigital launched "TriggerMarketing" – an automated, trigger-based lead generation program which sends an alert to a user's mobile device every time a completed job or new listing appears in the client's database, prompting them to initiate a marketing mailing to the surrounding area or neighborhood. The mail pieces feature direct response mechanisms such as a personalized URL, QR code, and texting to a short code number. The system tracks each response and sends an alert back to the user along with contact information for the new lead. The system also provides report generation functionality to assist users in evaluating the effectiveness of their direct marketing campaigns.

Also in 2010, QuantumDigital added two Xerox iGen4 EXP presses and anticipates production will reach between one and two million impressions per month on each system.

QuantumDigital (then QuantumDirect) was honored as one of the "Fastest Growing Companies in North America" in Deloitte's "Technology Fast 500" list for 2006, and was listed as "One of Texas' Fastest Growing Technology Companies" in Deloitte's "Texas Technology Fast 50 Program" in 2006 and 2008. The company made the Inc. 500 lists for 2005 and 2006, and was also honored as one of the "Fastest Growing Private Companies in America" in Inc Magazine's "Inc. 5000" in 2008. QuantumDigital has also received accreditation from the Better Business Bureau (BBB) under the classification of Mailing Services. In March 2009, QuantumDigital was awarded a Silver Marketing Excellence Award for Sales Support/Lead Generation and a Bronze Marketing Excellence Award for Digital Marketing by NAPL, the National Association for Printing Leaders. In the fall of 2009, QuantumDigital achieved the G7 Master Printer designation from IDEAlliance for their commitment to consistent and accurate results in their digital print workflow.

== See also ==
- List of companies based in Austin, Texas
