= Wayport, Inc. =

American internet access provider

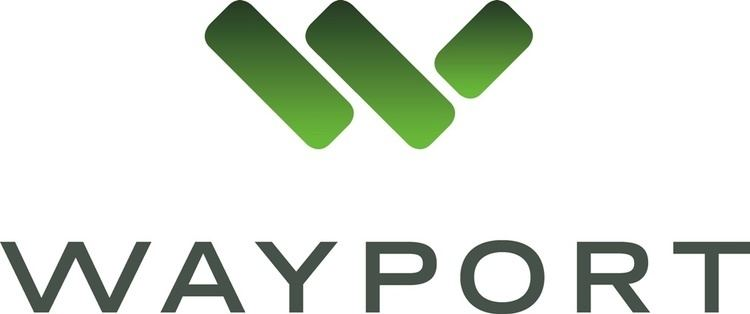
- Industry: Wi-Fi broadband internet access provider
- Founded: 1996; 29 years ago Austin, Texas, U.S.
- Area served: United States
- Products: Wi-Fi devices
- Owner: AT&T
- Website: www.wayport.net at the Wayback Machine (archived December 14, 2009)

Wayport, Inc. (now AT&T Wi-Fi Services) is a Wi-Fi broadband internet access provider, based in Austin, Texas. Wayport provides hotspots in approximately 28,000 locations (as of October 2010) throughout the United States. Venues include hotels, airports, sports venues, retail chain stores, McDonald's restaurants and Starbucks locations. Wayport began a program in 2004, Wayport Wi-Fi World, which would work with telecommunications partners, creating unlimited-use Wi-Fi locations, paid monthly by the location itself. The telecom companies involved would be able to legally resell the services under their own brand.

On November 6, 2008, AT&T announced the acquisition and buyout of Wayport for $275 million in cash, closing the acquisition on December 12, 2008.

On April 8, 2010, Swisscom Hospitality Services announced that it would acquire Wayport's EMEA division (Wayport Holdings A/S) which operated Wayport's hotspots in Europe, the Middle East, and Africa.

AT&T continues to own and operate the former Wayport assets in the United States. AT&T operated AT&T Wi-Fi services as a wholly owned subsidiary from December 2008 until mid-2012, at which time the subsidiary became part of AT&T proper.

As of May 2012, AT&T has on the order of 45,000 hotspots.

== See also ==
- List of companies based in Austin, Texas
