= Hang in there, Baby =

Motivational poster

The original "Hang in There, Baby" poster by Victor Baldwin, 1971

Hang in there, Baby is a popular catchphrase and motivational poster. There were several versions of the "Hang in There, Baby" poster, featuring a picture of a cat or kitten, hanging onto a stick, tree branch, pole or rope. The original poster featured a black and white photograph of a Siamese kitten clinging to a bamboo pole and was first published in late 1971 as a poster by Los Angeles photographer Victor Baldwin. It has since become a popular relic of the 1970s.

== History ==
Victor Baldwin owned a portrait studio in Beverly Hills, California, photographing famous clients including Frank Sinatra, Sammy Davis Jr., and Ronald Reagan. His first love, however, was animal photography, and he worked both in animal portraiture and as photo editor at Cat Fancy and Dog Fancy magazines. In 1956, he and his then-wife Jeanne Baldwin co-authored a children's book titled Little Kitten, Big World, featuring a Siamese kitten named Simmy.

In 1963, he photographed another of his Siamese kittens, Sassy, in various acrobatic poses, including the "chin up" on the bamboo pole that would later be used for the "Hang in There, Baby" poster. In 1970, Victor and Jeanne produced the book, The Outcast Kitten, featuring the photographs Victor had made of Sassy and other cats he owned at the time. Sassy, who has the fictional name Wiki in the book, is a lost kitten adopted by a mother cat with two kittens of her own. He attempts to be accepted by his adoptive siblings by performing acrobatic tricks. The "chin up" image is used within the book as well as on the back cover.

Before it was published as a poster, fans of the book wrote requesting copies of the photograph. It was also used to sell subscriptions to Cat Fancy, prompting more requests. Baldwin, himself a fan of the picture, saw an increasing demand and so produced it as a poster, choosing the words "Hang in There, Baby" to accompany the image.

Baldwin hung a copy of the poster in his studio window in 1972, which resulted in more interest in the image. The first copy of the poster was sold to the composer of The Music Man, Meredith Willson, who asked for it to be framed. More requests came in, and soon Baldwin was fulfilling orders of between one and ten posters per day. When his studio business began to suffer, he hired a staff to keep up with the orders.

== Popularity and copyright infringement ==
The Outcast Kitten, by Jeanne and Victor Baldwin, featuring "Sassy" the kitten.

The poster struck a chord with 1970s North Americans, and it became one of the best-selling posters of the era. Baldwin received letters from people telling him the poster had helped them through difficult life events such as surgeries. Baldwin himself said the cat "gave solace and strength to people everywhere, in all sorts of trouble, including myself". By 1973, Baldwin had sold 350,000 copies at $2.00 each. He lived for a time solely on the income from the posters, taking a break from his studio work, something he admitted he would rather be doing than selling posters.

Predictably, the poster's popularity spawned imitators. For a time, dozens of versions were available, using photographs or images of different cats – including at least one "blacklight" version – all with some variation of the "hang in there, baby" text. Some were bootleg copies of the original, and some were produced by major greeting card and poster publishers. Baldwin held the copyright to the original photograph since March 1, 1970, and to the poster with text since December 7, 1971. "As a matter of integrity, " Baldwin sued each infringement he could find, winning every case. However, he was awarded just enough to cover his legal fees. By the time the poster's initial popularity had waned, Baldwin estimated over 10 million unauthorized versions and direct copies of the poster had been made.

== Concerns for the cat's welfare ==
Baldwin received complaints from people who felt the scene constituted animal cruelty. Formerly a humane officer and a lifelong lover of animals, Baldwin assured those concerned that Sassy climbed up on the pole on her own and held onto it only briefly while playing. According to his nephew Roger Garrett, Baldwin spent a long time patiently waiting for his subject, and took 40 or 50 shots to get the "Hang in There, Baby" photo.

== In politics ==
In 1973, Vice President Spiro Agnew, charged with accepting $100,000 in bribes while holding office as Baltimore County Executive, Governor of Maryland, and Vice President, was allowed to plead no contest to a lesser charge as long as he agreed to resign as vice president. In September 1973, while he was considering his situation, Representatives William L. Dickenson, Republican from Alabama, and Samuel Devine, Republican from Ohio, presented him with a "Hang in There, Baby" poster signed by 100 members of Congress as a token of encouragement and support. Agnew resigned on October 10, 1973. President Nixon also received a copy of the poster from a supporter during the Watergate scandal.

Another copy of the kitten poster hangs in an outer office of former Canadian Prime Minister Justin Trudeau. The vintage poster originally belonged to his father, former Prime Minister Pierre Elliott Trudeau.

== Legacy ==
Victor Baldwin made approximately $700,000 from sales of the posters, much of which went to settle his divorce, which he was apparently happy to spend it on. Baldwin produced other animal-themed posters throughout the 1970s, as well as licensing a wristwatch, mugs, glasses and other products featuring the "Hang in There, Baby" cat image. The original poster was one of the earliest motivational posters, and is now considered collectible, often selling for many times its original value.

== See also ==
- Perlorian, a cat poster series popular in 1980s Japan
