= Gay Gaddis =

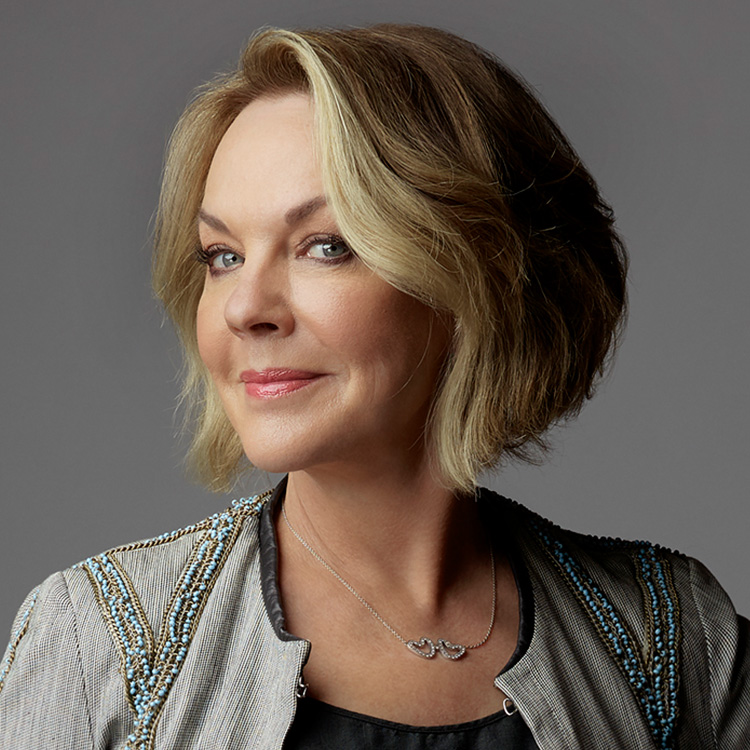
- Born: Gay Gaddis; Houston, Texas, US
- Education: The University of Texas at Austin (BFA)
- Occupation: Marketing executive
- Known for: Founder of T3
- Spouse: Lee Gaddis

Gay Gaddis (born Houston, Texas) is an American entrepreneur, speaker, author, and artist. In 1989, she founded T3, an advertising agency that grew into one of the largest female-owned agencies in the U.S., under her leadership for 30+ years with offices in New York, Atlanta, San Francisco and a headquarter in Austin, TX. T3 was a Certified Woman-Owned Business from 1999 to 2019, and through the T3 and Under program, Gaddis has been a pioneer in allowing parents to bring their newborn children into the office as a means by which to improve their transition to daycare. She is CEO of Gay Gaddis, LLC, and runs a women's development program she founded at the McCombs School of Business at University of Texas entitled Women Who Mean Business. She is a speaker on women's leadership, company culture and entrepreneurship. Her book, Cowgirl Power: How to Kick Ass in Business and Life, was released in 2018.

She has won awards including being the 11th female and only fine arts graduate inducted into the McCombs School of Business Hall of Fame at the University of Texas, Fast Company's "Top 25 Women Business Builders", Inc. Magazine's "Top 10 Entrepreneurs of the Year" and C200's Luminary Award for Entrepreneurial Excellence. She is a contributor to Forbes and Fortune.

Gay was the first female chairman of the Texas Business Leadership Council and is former chairman of The Committee of 200 (C200), a top women's business organization that advances women's leadership in business, and is on the board of directors of the Texas Cultural Trust. She was a board member for Monotype Imaging Holdings, Inc, is on the Dean's Advisory Council to The University of Texas McCombs School of Business, and an advisor for both the College of Fine Arts and the Moody College of Communication..

Gaddis is a mother of three. She and her husband, Lee own the Double Heart Ranch in the Texas Hill Country, home of Gay's private art studio and gallery. As an artist, Gaddis' paintings have been shown in galleries including the gallery at Fossil Ridge and New York City, and Texas Monthly magazine called her one of "Top Ten Artists to Collect Now".
