= T3 (company) =

US advertising agency

- Type: Private
- Industry: Advertising
- Founded: Austin, Texas (1989; 37 years ago)
- Headquarters: Austin, Texas
- Key people: Gay Gaddis, CEO Christian Barnard, COO
- Number of employees: 160
- Website: www.t-3.com

T3 Austin

T3 New York

T3 San Francisco

T3 was an independent advertising agency. Its headquarters were located in Austin, Texas and also had offices in New York City, Atlanta, and San Francisco. The agency, which focused on building brands, was founded in 1989 by CEO Gay Gaddis and was acquired by LRW in 2019. T3 was one of the largest independent agencies owned by a woman in the United States, with capitalized billings over $230 million.

== Clients ==
T3's clients include Allstate and UPS. ecent & Extended Client / Case Study Highlights Client / Brand Notes / What the Work Was About Source Allstate Insurance client of T3. Wikipedia

UPS Another long-standing client. Wikipedia

These are confirmed in the official Wikipedia page. Wikipedia

Additional & Related Clients / Work

Some are direct clients of T3; others are case studies or related to companies called “T3” (so be mindful which “T3” is meant).

Dell, Samsung, Nortel Networks, JCP Media — These are clients listed for “T3 (The Think Tank)” in an agency profile. It may not be exactly the same “T3 (Austin)” but shows association under similar name.

T3 Micro — A client of other firms (e.g. Guidance, Dotdigital) in case studies. For example, T3 Micro (hair-styling tools brand) had its e-commerce, site redesign, localization work done.

Franchisors, Brokerages, Realtor associations, MLS organizations, technology companies, real-estate investors / analysts — These are clients of T3 Sixty, which is a different entity (consultancy / advisory firm in real estate)

== Work and awards ==
T3 ranks among AdWeek's Top 100 Agencies and Advertising Age's 2006 Top 100 U.S. Marketing Services Agencies lists.

T3 has experience in both traditional and digital media across various verticals: Automotive, consumer goods, financial, government, healthcare, non-profit, retail, service, technology and travel. Within the digital realm, T3 offers analytics, application development, mobile, online advertising, web architecture and development, video, social and email. T3 created Coca-Cola Freestyle's first mobile app, PUSH! + Play for the iPhone and Android.

Work includes Wall Street Journal's "Every Journey Needs a Journal" site, JCPenney's desktop application, JCPToday, Dell's Virtual Office, and Marriott's Plug-In Site.

August 2011: CEO, Gay Gaddis was named one of the Top 10 Hottest Digital Marketers by iMedia.

== Leadership ==
Chief Executive Officer: Ben Gaddis

Chief Operating Officer: Christian Barnard

SVP, Chief Creative Officer: Jay Suhr

== Family-friendly policies ==
"T3 and Under" is the agency's in-house childcare program that allows parents to bring their babies to work until they are nine months old. T3's workplace programs have been recognized by the White House, The Today Show, The New York Times, Fortune Small Business and Good Morning America.

== See also ==
- List of companies based in Austin, Texas
