= Flying Eyes Optics =

Sunglasses company

- Company type: Privately held company
- Industry: Fashion, manufacturing, aviation
- Founder: Dean Siracusa, CEO
- Headquarters: Austin, Texas, U.S.
- Products: Sunglasses, eyewear, apparel
- Owner: Summer Hawk Optics, Inc.
- Website: flyingeyesoptics.com

Flying Eyes Optics (Flying Eyes) is an American eyewear manufacturer based in Austin, Texas. Founded in Buda, Texas in 2013, the company is recognized for its eyewear designed for pilots, motorcyclists, and outdoor enthusiasts.

== History ==
Flying Eyes Optics was founded by pilot and travel enthusiast Dean Siracusa to create eyewear compatible with helmets and headsets and uses a patented microthin temple technology. The company attributes the need for renewed sunglass compatibility due to the innovation of clamping springs in headsets, causing discomfort when used with traditional sunglasses.

== Innovations ==
In 2018, the company certified two frames, the Golden Eagle Sport and the Hawk Convertible, to meet ANSI/ISEA Z87.1-2015 safety standards to be used by first responders.

In 2021, the company introduced prescription-compatible eyeglasses using their patented polymer-based material called Resilamide with 1mm temples.

== Community Engagement ==
Flying Eyes participates in aviation-related events such as the National STOL Series.
