= Successories =

Producer of motivational office art

- Type: Private
- Industry: Promotional Products
- Founded: 1985
- Headquarters: Boca Raton, Florida, United States
- Area served: North America
- Products: Motivation, Inspiration, and Recognition
- Number of employees: 100
- Subsidiaries: Awards Kusak Crystal
- Website: Successories.com

Successories is a producer and retailer of motivational office art, mostly featuring photographs paired with sentiments about motivation, teamwork, and perseverance. The word "Successories" is itself a registered trademark.

== History ==
Successories was founded in 1985, by Mac Anderson, as an extension of his hobby of collecting quotations and motivational writings. Output initially consisted of books of quotations, award plaques, and customized gifts. Production of framed and captioned photographs, with which they have become identifiable, began soon after.

It has been said that Successories have adorned the office and garage walls of nearly all Silicon Valley startups which went on to become unicorns, but its original line of motivational posters soon began to be parodied.

In 1991, the first of a series of Successories retail stores opened, appearing in a number of malls across the United States. Most importantly, the decision was made to convert all of Successories' company-owned retail stores to franchise stores. The plan was to reduce the operating costs associated with providing the support necessary for company-owned stores. However, most of these stores have closed since going back to private in 2003.

In 2009, Successories was purchased by TWS Partnership, LLC, an investment group controlled by brothers Ted and Warren Struhl, who moved the company from Aurora, IL to Boca Raton, Florida. During that transition, all Successories stores and franchises were closed, thus transforming the brand into an eCommerce retailer with a focus on digital marketing as they moved away from traditional catalogs. Successories has also branched out into other areas of physical products for employee engagement and motivation.
