= Birds Barbershop =

U.S. brand of barbershops

- Industry: Hairdressing salon
- Founded: 2006
- Founder: Jayson Rapaport; Michael Portman
- Headquarters: Austin, Texas
- Services: Salon services
- Website: birdsbarbershop.com

Birds Barbershop is a brand of barbershops founded in Austin, Texas. The first shop was opened in 2006 by Jayson Rapaport and Michael Portman.

== History ==
Michael Portman left his job at Disney and moved to Austin, Texas where he met Jayson Rapaport.

== Design ==
Each of their local shops is built around a large-scale mural painted by a local artist.

Each Birds Barbershop has an independent color theme. Some locations have retro decor and others have sports themes. Each location has a large wall mural. The East 6th Street location, relocated in 2024, features murals by artist Bryan Keplesky."

== Awards ==
- One of America's 100 Best Salons - Elle, six consecutive years
- Best in the Beauty Business - Austin Monthly
- Best Beauty Salon - Austin A List, 2007
- Best of Austin 21 awards
- Austin Chronicle's 'Best Haircut'
