= Janet TV =

Janet TV is an American digital media company based in Austin, Texas that produces the web site JanetTV.com. Janet TV provides around the clock coverage of female athletes, active females and female sports including shows, videos, news, interviews, rankings, tips and scores. The company was founded in 2013 by Darryl L. Mobley, an entrepreneur and former Procter and Gamble executive.
