= Meta SaaS =

American software company

- Type: Private
- Industry: Software
- Founded: 2016 (Austin, Texas)
- Founder: Arlo Gilbert, Scott Hertel
- Headquarters: Austin, U.S.
- Area served: Worldwide
- Key people: Arlo Gilbert (CEO); Scott Hertel (CTO)
- Products: Meta SaaS
- Website: metasaas.com

Meta SaaS was a software company headquartered in Austin, Texas that provided Software Asset Management (SAM) for SaaS products.

== History ==
In September 2016, Arlo Gilbert alongside co-founder Scott Hertel launched Meta SaaS in Austin to solve problems related to the growth of unmanaged SaaS at businesses.

In 2016, Meta SaaS raised $2.1 million in seed funding. Investors in this seed round announced in May 2017 included Mark Cuban, Barracuda_Networks, Capital Factory, and others.

In May 2018, Meta SaaS was acquired by Flexera Software, a private software company based in Itasca, Illinois.

== Software and services ==
Meta SaaS published software that provided SaaS management and aggregated utilization reporting providing a 360-degree view across all cloud applications, systems of record, and various financial tools. Meta SaaS displayed the unified customer information in near-real-time to administrators at customer sites. Meta SaaS was used by emerging businesses in various industries such as technology, finance, healthcare, education, and others.

It offered features in the following areas: SaaS management, SaaS license optimization, and Shadow IT identification.

Meta SaaS integrated vendors including Salesforce, Box, Workday, Cisco, Zendesk, and others.

== Funding ==
In May 2017, Meta SaaS announced a seed round of $1.5 million led by Mark Cuban, with participation from Barracuda Networks and Capital Factory.

== Acquisition by Flexera ==
On May 2, 2018, Flexera announced its acquisition of Meta SaaS, stating that the product would be rebranded as Flexera SaaS Manager. At the time of the announcement, Flexera said the acquisition would allow it to monitor license utilization for more than 6,200 SaaS applications and provide visibility into more than 32,000 SaaS applications across an enterprise, including those procured outside official channels ("Shadow SaaS"). According to Silicon Hills News, Meta SaaS's operations were to continue in Austin following the acquisition, per a blog post by co-founder and CEO Arlo Gilbert.

Flexera cited an example in which a telecommunications company used Meta SaaS to analyze a single year of expense reports and discovered millions of dollars in spending on 295 unsanctioned products from 266 different vendors.
