= Sweet Leaf Tea Company =

Producer of ready-to-drink organic teas and lemonades

- Company type: Subsidiary
- Industry: Beverage
- Founded: Beaumont, TX, 1998
- Founder: Clayton Christopher; David Smith
- Headquarters: Austin, Texas
- Products: See products section
- Number of employees: 43
- Parent: BlueTriton Brands
- Website: sweetleaftea.com

Sweet Leaf Tea Company was a producer of ready-to-drink organic branded teas and lemonades owned by Nestlé. It was founded in Beaumont, TX in 1998 by Clayton Christopher and David Smith.

On April 2, 2008, Sweet Leaf Tea Company announced $18 million in private funding from Catterton Partners. On May 29, 2008, Sweet Leaf Tea Company filed suit against an Arizona-based company for the name of their sweetener, SweetLeaf Stevia.

== History ==
Sweet Leaf Tea was founded in 1998 in Beaumont, TX by Clayton Christopher, using $10,000 and his grandmother's recipe for home-brewed iced tea made with cane sugar. Early production consisted of brewing tea in crawfish pots in Hen's kitchen, using pillow cases as "tea bags" and; then using garden hoses to transport the tea to plastic bottles.

In March 2009, Nestlé Waters North America invested $15.6 million in the company. In 2012, Clayton Christopher stepped down as CEO and was succeeded by former Nestlé General Manager Dan Costello.

In April 2010, Sweet Leaf acquired Cincinnati-based Tradewinds Beverage Co.

In 2012, Sweet Leaf replaced the organic brewed tea used in the original recipes with organic tea concentrate.

In December 2017, Nestle Waters North America announced the sale of the Sweet Leaf Tea Company, which was a wholly owned and operated subsidiary, to Dunn's River Brands.

Dunn's River Brands partnered with Fireman Capital Partners to underwrite the purchase, and grow the new holdings company. The rights to Sweet Leaf Tea and Tradewinds Tea were included in the sale, along with all manufacturing and production equipment contained in the Carlisle, Ohio facility, where both brands were brewed, blended and bottled up to that point.

In September 2018, Dunn's River Brands spun the factory and the equipment within off in a sale and partnership with Refresco Beverages N.A. This partnership saw the day to day administration and operation of the Carlisle, Ohio site come under the control of Refresco, while Dunn's River Brands retained the brand rights to Sweet Leaf Tea and Tradewinds Tea.

In July 2019, Dunn's River Brands and Fireman Capital Partners' financial endeavor collapsed, and culminated in a bankruptcy for Dunn's River Brands and it's intellectual property holdings. The last batches of Tradewinds Teas to ever be manufactured were made that July. Refresco N.A. lost a seven figure sum in the failed investment, and subsequently refused any future efforts to restart production of Tradewinds Tea at the Carlisle, Ohio manufacturing facility.

In January 2020, the rights to Sweet Leaf Tea and Tradewinds were acquired by Purity Organics.

The rights to Tradewinds Tea would be sold yet again in early 2021, to Towne Club Bottling Co. There has been no official attempt to resurrect the production of Tradewinds Tea since May 2021.

== Products ==
Teas

- Organic Original Sweet Tea
- Diet Original Sweet Tea
- Organic Mint & Honey Green Tea
- Organic Citrus Green Tea
- Diet Citrus Green Tea
- Organic Peach Sweet Tea
- Organic Lemon Sweet Tea
- Raspberry Sweet Tea
- Lemon Lime Unsweet Tea
- Organic Half & Half Lemonade Tea
- Diet Mint & Honey Green Tea (discontinued)
- Diet Peach Sweet Tea (discontinued)
- Organic Mango Green Tea (discontinued)
- Organic Pomegranate Green Tea (discontinued)

Lemonades

- Organic Original Lemonade
- Organic Peach Lemonade (discontinued)
- Organic Cherry Limeade (discontinued)

== Headquarters ==
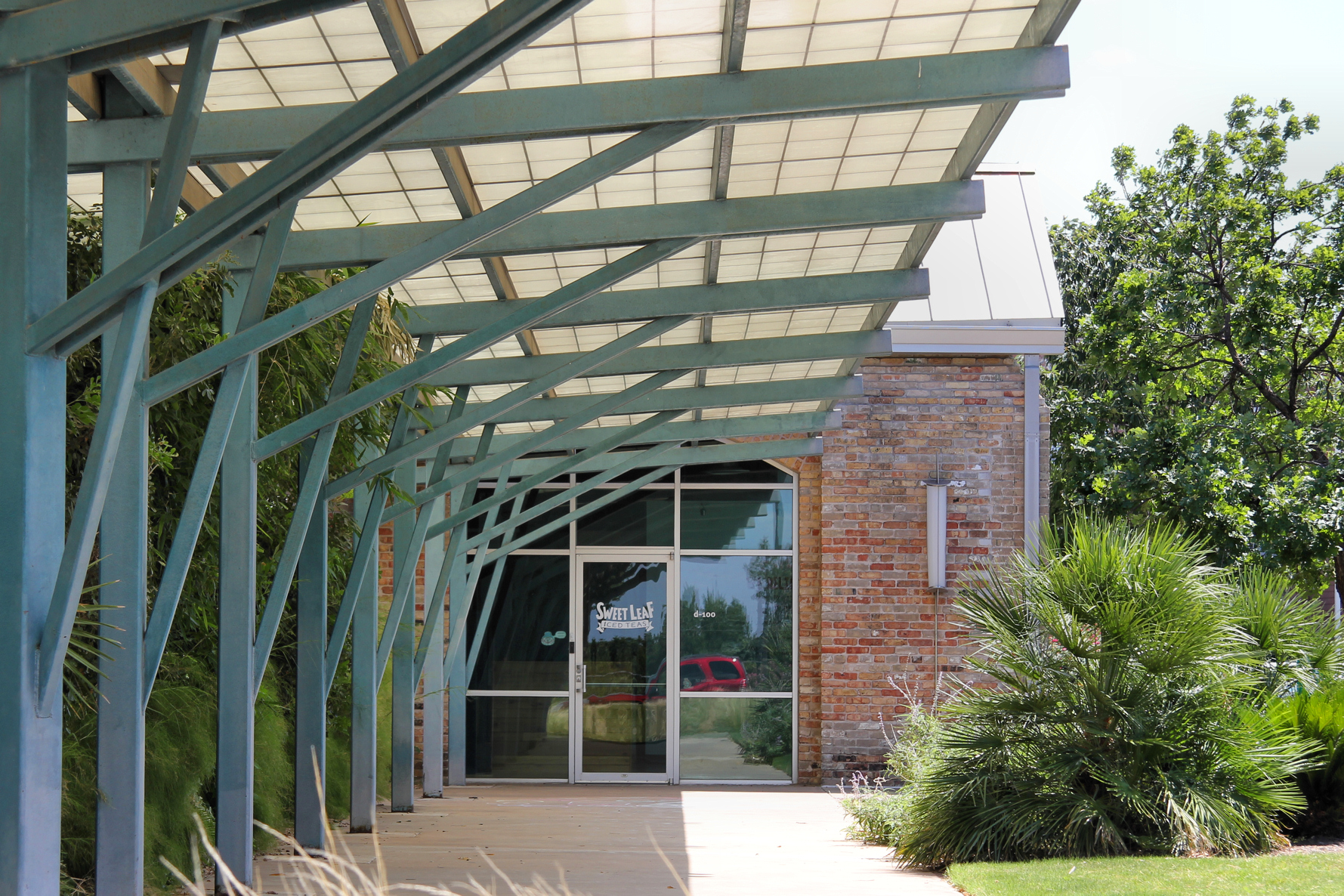
The entrance to Sweet Leaf Tea in Penn Field Business Park.

Sweet Leaf is headquartered in the Penn Field Business Park in the South Congress area of Austin, Texas.

Sweet Leaf originally had its headquarters in Beaumont, Texas. The headquarters moved to Austin in October 2003. In the mid-2000s, Sweet Leaf headquartered in an area west of Downtown Austin. In 2007, Sweet Leaf relocated to the South Congress area. In April 2009, the company began to look for a larger headquarters space. In October 2009, Sweet Leaf announced that it planned to move its headquarters to a LEED certified building during that month. In December 2009, the company moved its headquarters to the Penn Field Business Park in South Congress.

== See also ==
- List of companies based in Austin, Texas
