= KaleidoScoops =

American chain of ice cream shops

- Type: Co-operative
- Industry: Retail
- Founded: 1999; 27 years ago
- Headquarters: Alabama, United States
- Number of locations: 2
- Area served: United States
- Products: Ice cream

KaleidoScoops is an American chain of ice cream shops. It was founded in 1999 by a co-operative of former Baskin-Robbins franchisees after the termination of their franchises. The chain now only has 2 locations. One in Glenwood Springs, Colorado; The other in Carlsbad, New Mexico.

== Company history ==
KaleidoScoops was formed in 1999 by several former Baskin-Robbins franchisees after the latter company terminated approximately 200 domestic franchisee agreements in Southern markets they deemed "nonstrategic." Over forty of the former franchisees united to form the new company, KaleidoScoops, which operates as a cooperative based in Austin, Texas. These people formed the co-op to improve the quality of the ice cream, lower the cost of overhead and pass the savings on to longtime neighborhood customers.

The first stores to be converted experienced an initial drop in sales of about 20 percent. But as customers tried the new ice cream, sales rose above pre-conversion amounts. Between 2000 and 2003, KaleidoScoops doubled in size, with many of its members entering the cooperative with no prior experience owning ice cream shops. These new owners brought in fresh perspectives and new ideas to Kaleidoscoops that have allowed the company to expand into 20 states. Kaleidoscoops is still expanding and is still having franchisees convert from other ice cream chains.
