= Econohomes =

- Company type: privately held
- Industry: real estate
- Founded: 2006
- Headquarters: Austin, Texas
- Key people: Jeff Ball

Econohomes is a privately held company based in Austin, Texas, specializing in foreclosures. It's known as real estate owned properties (REO), and specialty financing across the United States. The company buys distressed residential properties wholesale and resells them online at prices under $100,000. Buyers are mostly made up of investors who renovate and resell or rent the properties.

== History ==
Founded in 2006, Econohomes’ initial goal was to serve the deep sub-prime market by retailing affordable homes. But, after the subprime mortgage crisis, CEO Jeff Ball realigned the business model to sell to investors.

Jeff Ball is responsible for managing the day-to-day operations of the business, as well as spearheading capital raising efforts. Most recently, Jeff was the Global Head of Semiconductor Investment Banking at JPMorgan. Jeff received his JD and MBA from Santa Clara University. He received his BA in Economics and Theology from Georgetown University.

Econohomes offers full bilingual services and Spanish-language online information to help the Hispanic community buy more real estate as first time home owners and real estate investors.

== Recent news ==
In 2012, Personal Real Estate Investor Magazine named Econohomes as one of the Top 50 Real Estate Investment Opinion Makers and Market Leaders in the category of Leading Lenders and Other Vital Services.

Additionally, in 2012, Econohomes was named number 15 of The 100 Best Companies to Work for in Texas, a project of the Texas Association of Business (TAB), the Society for Human Resources Management – Texas State Council, and the Best Companies Group. This ranking was awarded in the Small Companies division.

On October 18, 2012, Econohomes was awarded the #2 spot on Austin Business Journal’s annual list of Austin’s 50 fastest growing private companies, in the category of businesses grossing over $10M in yearly revenue.

According to Jeff Ball, CEO of Econohomes, being named second of the Fast 50 is an honor and a result of the increasingly vital role Econohomes is playing in turning distressed properties lost to foreclosure back into family homes. "At Econohomes, we are passionate about helping small, local investors unlock the value trapped in distressed foreclosure properties,” says Ball.

On November 12, 2012, Econohomes was named #40 on Austin American-Statesman’s 2012 Top Workplaces of Greater Austin list. The list was compiled through WorkplaceDynamics’ surveys asking workers to rate their employers on issues such as leadership and direction, ethics and values, and how well employees are treated. The ranking was awarded in the Top Small Companies 2012 category.
