= Ticketbud =

SaaS Platform for Event Organizers

- Company type: Private
- Website type: Ticket sales, Event Management
- Available in: English
- Founded: Austin, Texas, United States
- Headquarters: Austin, Texas, United States
- Area served: Worldwide
- Founder: Paul Cross
- Employees: 10+
- Website: ticketbud.com
- Current status: Active

Ticketbud is an event management, ticketing and registration SaaS platform for event organizers. The software allows event organizers to sell tickets to events and also to promote and market their events on websites like Facebook, X, and Instagram. Founded in 2009 in Austin, Texas, Ticketbud's revenue is derived from a fee placed upon tickets sold through its software at $0.99 + 2% of the ticket's value per ticket.

== Features ==
- On Ticketbud, organizers are given a basic event page which can be modified, including features such as donation tickets, "comped" tickets, discount codes, and RSVPs. Unlike most of its competitors, however, it does not yet offered reserved seating.
- Ticketbud maintains event ticketing mobile apps for event organizers on both Android and iOS devices. The app allows organizers to scan tickets, manage their events, and view real-time attendee data. It also offers mobile ticketing options for ticket purchasers.
- The company also runs an event planning blog for planners and marketers.

== Funding ==
In 2011, Ticketbud received $1.2 million in its Series A round of funding.

== See also ==
- Mobile ticketing
- E-mail ticketing system
