= Pristine (company) =

Pristine.io
- Type: Private (venture funded)
- Industry: Telepresence, Videoconferencing
- Founded: 2013
- Headquarters: Austin, Texas, United States
- Key people: CEO: Kyle Samani
- Number of employees: 20+
- Website: www.pristine.io

Pristine was a VC funded startup that developed software for hands-free smartglasses and smart mobile devices, enabling video collaboration and remote support in industrial and manufacturing environments, field service management and healthcare. Pristine was based in Austin, Texas. It was acquired in 2017.

== History ==
Pristine was founded by Kyle Samani and Patrick Kolencherry in May 2013, shortly after Google announced the Google Glass program. It raised initial funding through angel investors and began piloting in a major academic medical center. In the months following, Pristine raised over $5 million in venture capital investment from S3 Ventures, Capital Factory, Healthfundr, and others.

Pristine took second place at HATCH Pitch 2013, a start-up pitch competition that was held at the George R. Brown Convention Center.

University of California, Irvine participated in a smartglasses pilot in October 2013, and announced in February the following year that they would roll out the technology to outpatient programs and wound care.

Pristine launched the first Google Glass pilot in an emergency room at Rhode Island Hospital in April 2014. It resulted in a peer-reviewed study published in JAMA Dermatology on the use of smartglasses in a healthcare environment.

In May 2017, Pristine was acquired by Upskill, an augmented reality company based in Herndon, Virginia, for an undisclosed amount.

== Partners ==
In October 2014, Pristine was announced as an official partner of Google’s "Glass at Work" program.

== See also ==
- Augmented reality
- Hands-free computing
- mHealth
- Telehealth
