= Geomedia Inc. =

American production firm

- Founded: 1996
- Founders: Martin Jaeger; Murray Breit
- Headquarters: San Antonio, Texas, United States
- Website: geomedia.com

Geomedia Inc. is a media production firm based in San Antonio, Texas, in the United States.

== History ==
Geomedia was founded by Martin Jaeger and Murray Breit in 1996 as a small post-production facility. Since then, the company has grown by acquiring and developing new media technologies. According to Zach Nasits, one of the company's co-owners who also serves as director of photography and production.

Geomedia added a live production department in 2002. In 2010, San Antonio Business Journal described the company's office at 4242 Medical Drive, as housing seven editing and motion graphic suites for post production, a 3D animation and design department, and Digital HD acquisition capabilities and technology.

The company experienced 15 percent growth in revenue between 2011 and 2012. The education and technology company Zoo-AR was created in 2011 as a subsidiary of Geomedia. In 2012, Geomedia experienced a 60 percent growth in salary costs with the addition of five employees. By August 2015, the company had 14 employees and expanded into Austin. Nasits said of the expansion, "Now that we're getting in contact with more businesses up there we wanted to establish a footprint and have some people based up there."

== Services and projects ==
Geomedia is a media production, visual effects and interactive media firm. The company does much of its own research and development in-house. It has created commercial advertisements for companies like SWBC, featuring San Antonio Spurs player Tony Parker, and numerous productions for Valero Energy. Geomedia has also worked with Dell; Grupo Bimbo; the supermarket chain H-E-B; the San Antonio Spurs; Wonder Bread, for which it produced three commercials starring National Basketball Association players Jason Kidd, Eduardo Nájera, and Steve Nash (2010); and the American Museum of Natural History, for which the company created a mobile game MicroRanger (2014).

In 2014, Geomedia contributed 3D animation and visual effects for the IMAX documentary film about the British navy's attack on Fort McHenry during the War of 1812 called Star-Spangled Banner: Anthem of Liberty, and completed editorial and post-production on their first feature length David Kauffman-produced film The One I Wrote for You. In 2015, the company was invited to Google's headquarters to help develop applications for its Project Tango program.

=== Augmented realty and virtual reality development ===
Geomedia's Augmented Realty (AR) technology integrates 3D animated objects into real world environments when viewed through a mobile device. The technology has been used by aquariums and museums throughout the United States. The first major AR installation was completed in February 2013 at San Antonio's Witte Museum, in association with its exhibit "Dinosaurs Unearthed; Bigger. Better. Feathered." This marked Geomedia's first major installation and the first of its kind in the country. "Augmented Reality Dinosaurs" was created for the Vancouver-based company Dinosaurs Unearthed. 3D dinosaurs were built from scratch and required "a mixture of artistic license and scientific fact". Geomedia created more than 15 dinosaurs with over 60 distinct animations. The installation features an app created by Geomedia for the museum, which visitors can access on their own devices or at iPads places throughout the exhibit.

In 2013 Geomedia partnered with the San Antonio Zoo and Aquarium to release SA Zoo-AR, a free mobile app that utilizes augmented reality to animate the zoo's animals on visitors' devices. Later that year, Geomedia and Blondecreative co-developed the Virtual Career Center (VCC), a job-search tool, for Workforce Solutions Alamo and Alamo Colleges. VCC features "a 3-D gaming platform to mimic a trip to a Workforce career center, albeit with imaginary enhancements such as marble staircases and a Manhattan-style backdrop of neighboring skyscrapers".

In July 2015, Geomedia released DinoTrek VR (also known as DinoTrek Virtual Reality Experience), a virtual reality app designed for iPhone 6 and iPhone 6+ and available on the iOS operating system, with full support for the Google Cardboard head-mounted display (HMD). The app features fully rendered 360-degree environments in which users can encounter dinosaurs. It complements the augment reality experience Dinosaurs in the Wild, which is planned to exhibit at 20 museums. DinoTrek VR is available for Apple and Android devices.

== Recognition ==
In 2012, Geomedia earned a Silver ADDY for Elements of Advertising and a Gold ADDY for Interactive Media. In 2015, the company received a Gold ADDY and a Special Judges Award for Cinematography for "The Right Fit", their Jefferson Bank television commercial created in collaboration with the advertising agency Texas Creative.
