= Door Number 3 =

Independent brand development and integrated advertising agency

- Type: Private
- Industry: Advertising
- Headquarters: Austin, Texas
- Key people: Prentice Howe, President, Executive Creative Director; Karen Reiner, Vice President, Director of Account Service; Zach Cochran, Director of Media
- Services: Integrated Brand Development, Advertising and Media
- Website: dn3austin.com Facebook

Door Number 3 is an independent brand development and integrated advertising agency located in Austin, Texas, United States. The agency is known for creating and integrating marketing that helps challenger brands topple their giants.

The agency was founded in 1994 by M.P. Mueller. Mueller is also known for her blog featured in The New York Times, "You're the Boss: The Art of Running a Small Business" series. The agency was purchased by Prentice Howe in February 2015. Prior to taking sole ownership of the company, Howe worked at Door Number 3 as Executive Creative Director from 2005 to 2012.

Door Number 3 relocated their offices from East Austin to 910 West Avenue in 2016.

== Campaigns ==
The firm's "Can you love a road?" campaign for the SH 130 Concession Company in 2012 gained wide state recognition and was also featured in The New York Times.

The firm's "Access Granted" campaign in 2012 for the Cowboys Stadium was featured in Communication Arts (magazine).

In 2010, the firm launched "The Allies of the Alamo", the first marketing campaign for the landmark. The campaign was featured in Communication Arts, AdWeek and AdFreak.

The firm's Number 3's 2010 "Heads of State" campaign for small Georgetown-based company, Cow Wow, featured six-foot terra cotta busts of Texas gubernatorial candidates Rick Perry and Bill White. The campaign was featured on a "Stuff from Ebay" segment on the Tonight Show with Jay Leno.

The firm's campaign for The Blood Center of Central Texas was covered by Austin American-Statesman and The New York Times. AdWeek and AdFreak both featured Door Number 3's work for The Blood Center of Central Texas as the Ad of the Day.

The firm's viral marketing campaign launched in 2008. In 2009, the website GetYourDrugOn.com was nominated for a Webby Award. It was highlighted by AdWeek as an Ad of the Day.

The firm's "Come Into the Cold" campaign for the Dallas Stars played off on the roughness of hockey compared to other sports, which gained media attention from a variety of media outlets.

== Recognition ==
- 2012 Webby for "Stop the Choddy" Initiative
- 2009 Silver Addy Micro or Mini Site for CEDRA Clinical Research
- 2009 Bronze Addy Mixed Media Local Consumer for American Bank of Texas
- 2009 Bronze Addy Mixed Media National Consumer for American Bank of Texas
- 2009 Webby Award, People's Voice for CEDRA Clinical Research
- 2009 AdWeek Ad of the Day for The Blood Center of Central Texas
- 2008 Communication Arts 50th Anniversary Issue, Campaign for Marfa Texas
- 2008 Ad Freak Ad of the Day for The Blood Center of Central Texas
- 2008 Adweek Ad of the Day for CEDRA Clinical Research
