= Illumitex =

American lighting manufacturer

Illumitex Inc.
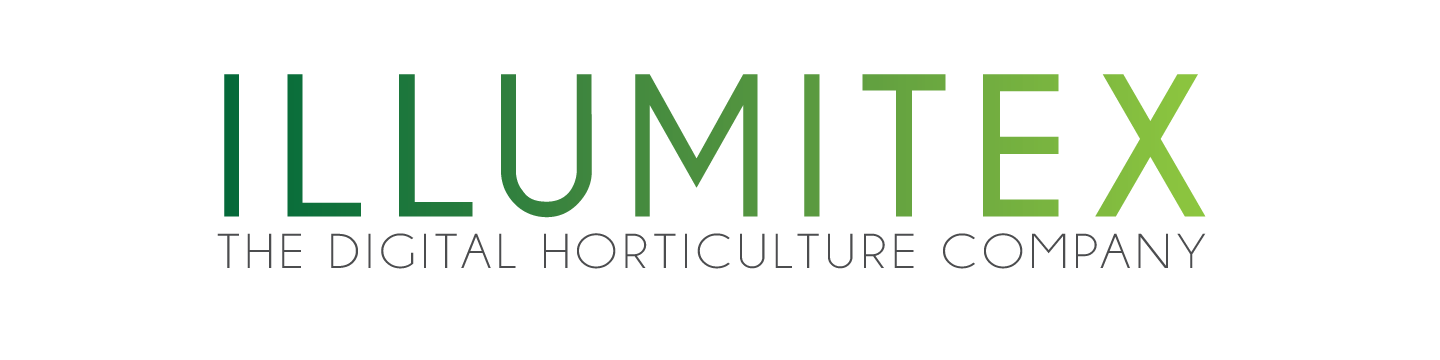
- Company type: Private
- Industry: Lighting
- Genre: Manufacturing
- Founded: 2005
- Founder: Matt Thomas; Dung Duong; Paul Winberg
- Headquarters: Austin, TX, U.S.
- Area served: Worldwide
- Key people: Jeff Bisberg (CEO)
- Products: LED lights
- Number of employees: 500
- Website: Official Website

Illumitex was an American lighting manufacturer largely specializing in the production and development of LED lights for indoor farming and vertical farming. In addition to grow lights, Illumitex also creates lights for the Commercial & Industrial space, as well as digital horticulture solutions. The company is based in Austin, Texas and has manufacturing facilities in Austin, China, and Malaysia.

== History ==
Illumitex was founded in 2005 by Matt Thomas, Dung Duong, and Paul Winberg. The company largely stayed under the radar until they began receiving funding in 2008. They raised $10.5 million in a B round of funding in 2008 and, in 2009, added an additional $10 million in another round. By 2010, the company had received around $22 million in investor funding from groups like New Enterprise Associates, DFJ Mercury, and Applied Ventures. Also in 2010, Illumitex released its first product line (dubbed "Aduro") which consisted of square-shaped LED lights that could theoretically provide more light coverage than traditional rounded LED lights. The company's original goal was to provide residential and commercial lighting solutions for indoor rooms, parking lots, streetlights, and more. One of Illumitex's early clients was an apartment complex in Singapore. In 2011, Illumitex added an additional $13.5 million in equity.

In April 2012, the company received an additional $9.3 million from existing investors, bringing the total money raised to $50.3 million. The company continued to pursue options in vertical farming, contained environmental agriculture, and tissue culture laboratories as well as general illumination. Illumitex had 35 employees in 2012. The company raised $3.8 million in 2013 and added around $6 million in 2014. In August 2014, Illumitex announced plans to double the size of its headquarters. In 2015, the company secured $16 million in a funding round led by WP Global Partners. As of 2015, greenhouses account for the largest portion of Illumitex's customer base. The company has also provided lighting to prominent vertical farms like the Chicago-based FarmHere, which provided crops to Whole Foods. Illumitex terminated its LED lighting operations in 2020.

== Products ==
As of 2015, most of Illumitex's products are used in contained environmental agriculture and vertical farming operations. The company produces a wide range of LED lights with customized intensity and wavelengths. The company's lights produce the "theoretical maximum amount of light for photosynthesis." Illumitex also produces its own fixtures and other lighting accessories. Everything that goes into light construction (e.g. phosphors, dies, packaging, etc.) is produced by an Illumitex factory. Illumitex lights have been used to grow plants like tomatoes, basil, kale, and other vegetables. Marijuana is also frequently grown under Illumitex lights. Illumitex also makes patented LED white light fixtures for the food-processing industry and for architecture.

== Awards and recognition ==
In 2015, the Austin Chamber of Commerce listed Illumitex among its class of A-List Startups. The list identifies the 12 "most promising" startups in the Austin area.
