= Cerilliant Corporation =

- Company type: Private
- Founded: (incorporated 2000)
- Headquarters: 811 Paloma Drive, Suite A Round Rock, Texas, United States
- Area served: Worldwide
- Key people: Sherri Pogue; President and CEO
- Products: Certified reference standards Certified reference materials
- Website: cerilliant.com

Cerilliant Corporation, located in Round Rock, Texas, is a manufacturer of certified reference standards and certified reference materials providing products and services to forensic / toxicology, diagnostic/clinical, environmental, natural products, and pharmaceutical industries. Cerilliant is accredited to ISO Guide 34 & ISO/IEC 17025 and certified to ISO 13485 and ISO 9001:2008.

Formerly known as the Analytical Reference Materials Division of Radian International, Cerilliant was founded in 1980 and began producing chemical reference standards to address the needs of the emerging environmental testing industry. The company was the first to produce 13C labeled chlorinated dioxins and furans in cooperation with Cambridge Isotope Laboratories. Cerilliant innovated Snap-N-Shoot ready-to-use reference standards in solution, pioneered DEA-exempt preparations of controlled substances in solution, was the first to offer certified isotope-labeled drug reference standards, and the first to develop critical metabolites, impurities, and degradants of certain drugs and environmental contaminants. In 2000, Radian's parent, URS Corporation, made the decision to divest the division. Cerilliant was formed following the purchase of the division by private investors.

Cerilliant provides catalog and custom products and services including Certified Solution Standards, Certified Spiking Solutions, custom organic synthesis of neat reference materials as well as independent analytical certifications and custom packaging of client reference standards.

Catalog products include Drugs-of-Abuse, Pharmaceuticals, Drug Metabolites and Impurities, P450 metabolites, Glucuronides, Benzodiazepines, Opiates, Steroids, Amphetamines, Drug Mixes, Nitroglycerins/ Explosives, Chemical Warfare by-products, and Phytochemicals. Custom services include synthesis of drug substances, metabolites, impurities, and degradants (including stable isotope-labeled compounds), analytical certifications, custom packaging of all types of materials (single-use or bulk), and custom standard dilutions of single or multi-component mixes.

Cerilliant was acquired by Sigma-Aldrich in 2011. Sigma-Aldrich was acquired by Merck KGaA, Darmstadt, Germany in 2015.
