= JourneyEd =

American educational technology company

Journey Education Marketing, Inc
- Type: Private
- Industry: Education; Retail
- Founded: 1990
- Founder: Michael Fischler
- Headquarters: Plano, Texas, USA
- Key people: Greg Lamkin, CEO
- Products: software hardware books bags

JourneyEd, along with its subsidiaries, sells academic software to members of the educational community in North America and Canada. Vendors such as Microsoft, Adobe, Corel, and others offer academic versions of software to students, faculty, staff, educational institutions, and public school districts. These academic versions of software are almost identical to their commercial versions in functionality, but offered at a lower price point to eligible buyers. Through a partnership with vendors and its Academic eStore Network of 15,000 websites, JourneyEd makes these titles available, and verifies academic buyers.

== History ==
JourneyEd was founded in order to expand the reach of software and hardware companies who offered discounted academic or education versions of popular software/hardware. At the time of its founding, vendors were typically offering these academic versions to four-year universities. With the founding of JourneyEd, these versions were made available to other members of the educational community such as two-year or vocational schools, faculty and staff, and individual students.

In 2001, with the goal of bringing metadata solutions to universities, JourneyEd acquired Hiawatha Island Software Company, Inc., a knowledge management, Web site promotion, and e-business intelligence software company. The goal was to bring metadata solutions to universities.

In January 2004, JourneyEdEurope.com was launched. This division is managed by Journey Education Europe GmbH & Co. KG and headquartered in Bremerhaven, Germany.

In early 2006, JourneyEd partnered with Educational Resources, in order to further the Microsoft Student Select program. Educational Resources provides educational technology, hardware, accessories, and supplemental products for the K–12 market. They are also a Microsoft large account reseller. The Microsoft Student Select program enables K–12 students, parents, teachers, and employees of certain education driven organizations (i.e. WSIPC) to purchase the same academic Microsoft programs used at school for use in the home, at a significant discount. JourneyEd provides a website for each school a vehicle for purchase and provides marketing materials for the school to promote the opportunity.

In May 2006, public schools in Washington became one of the first to offer this program to the academic community. The number of schools implementing the program continues to increase; in January 2009, Florence 1, in South Carolina, became the first district in the state to offer the program.

In February 2008, JourneyEd acquired CCV Software, expanding its reach from the secondary education market into the K–12 market. Founded in 1982 by Dr. Catherine Chandler, CCV Software, Inc. has offered educational software to schools K–12. CCV Software acts as the K-12 division within JourneyEd.

In April 2008, JourneyEd added CampusTec.com to its Academic eStore Network. CampusU, Inc. is an interactive merchandising, marketing and media company focused on the college student market.

In January 2009, JourneyEd acquired the online retailer Academic Superstore. Founded in 1998 and selected as an Inc.500 company in 2005, Austin-based Academic Superstore sells academic software and hardware to the educational community at discount prices. In 2006, their online newsletter won a clickz.com award for best business to consumer e-newsletter. JourneyEd aimed to increase market share and integrate Academic Superstore's technology resources to increase operational efficiencies, improve customer service, and lower overall costs.

In September 2010, Digital River acquired JourneyEd. On October 1, 2013, Digital River divested itself of JourneyEd.
