= Honestech =

Supplier of digital video and audio communication and entertainment solutions

Honestech, Inc
- Industry: Software
- Founded: 1998
- Founder: Jay Choi
- Headquarters: Austin, TX
- Website: www.honestech.com

Honest Technology, or Honestech Inc., is a supplier of digital video and audio communication and entertainment solutions. Some of their flagship products include VHS to DVD, Audio Recorder, FOTOBOX Plus, MY-IPTV, and Claymation Studio. The company develops products based on real-time MPEG encoding/decoding software technologies.

== Products ==
- VHStoDVD Deluxe
- Audio Recorder 2.0 Deluxe
- Claymation Studio 2.0
- Video Editor 8.0
- nScreen Deluxe
- nScreen Office
- nScreen Stick
- Home Monitor Wireless
- FOTOBOX Plus

== Awards ==
Honestech Inc. won the 2009 CES "Design and Engineering" award.
