= Motivational poster =

Type of poster designed to inspire people

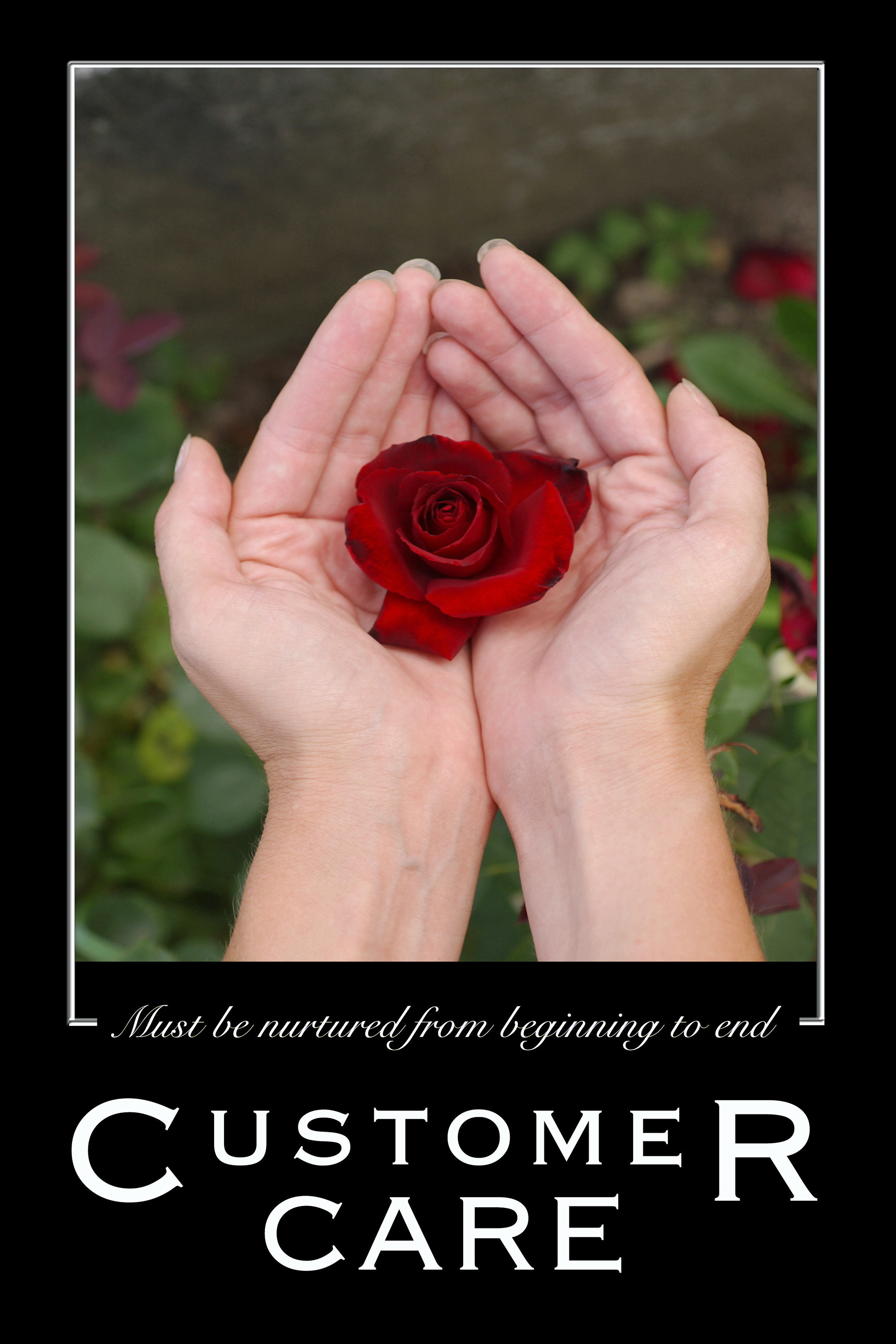
A motivational poster in the style of those produced by Successories

A motivational poster, or inspirational poster, is a type of poster commonly designed for use in schools and offices.

== Intent ==
Keep Calm and Carry On poster created in World War II in Britain

The intent of motivational posters is to make people achieve more, or to think differently about the things that they may be learning or doing.

This is not how everyone views such posters, however. Art Petty, for example, in discussing innovation writes that it "cannot be mandated or legislated, and it definitely is not inspired by the corporate motivational poster". CBS News concludes that modern motivational posters "are geared more toward things that need to be done than things that are good to believe".

== Effects ==
Motivational posters can have behavioral effects. For example, Mutrie and Blamey, of the University of Glasgow and the Greater Glasgow Health Board, found in one study that their placement of a motivational poster that promotes stair use in front of an escalator and a parallel staircase, in an underground station, doubled the amount of stair use. These studies all support the finding that such motivational posters, placed at the point of decision, can have a behavioral effect, with this effect decreasing back to zero gradually over a period of weeks after the removal of the poster.

== Parodies and demotivational posters ==
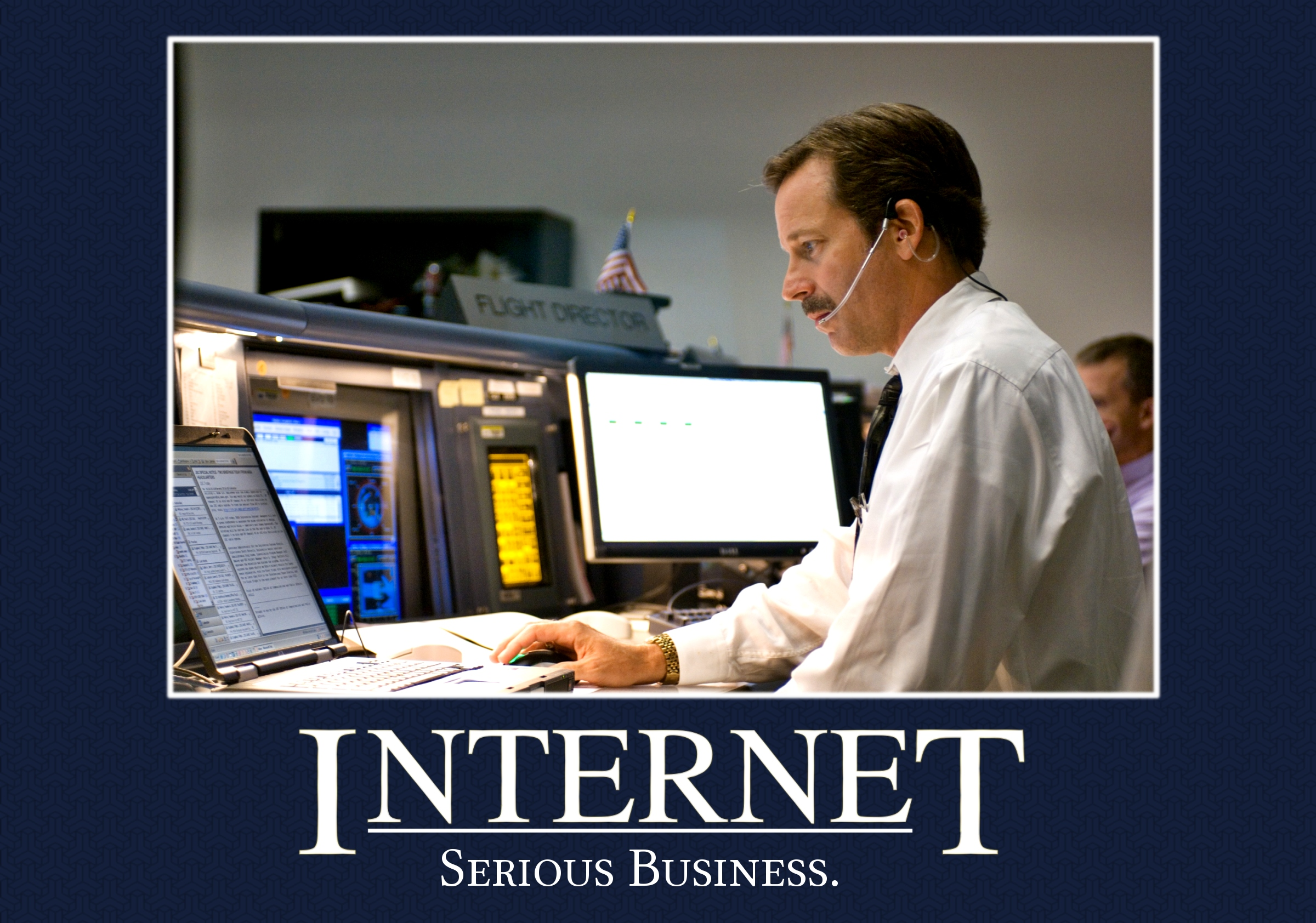
An example of a parody motivational poster: "Internet. Serious Business."

Parodies of motivational posters, generally known as demotivational posters or demotivators have become an Internet meme. One famous motivational poster features a kitten hanging from a tree branch along with the phrase "Hang in There, Baby!" This has been the target of various reproductions and parodies, such as an appearance on The Simpsons episode "The Twisted World of Marge Simpson" where Marge Simpson notices the copyright date (1968) and comments, "...determined or not, that cat must be long dead. That's kind of a downer." Another reference to the poster is The Onion's 1999 "In the News" photograph titled "Inspirational Poster Kitten Falls To Death After 17 Years".
