= Electrical telegraphy in the United Kingdom =

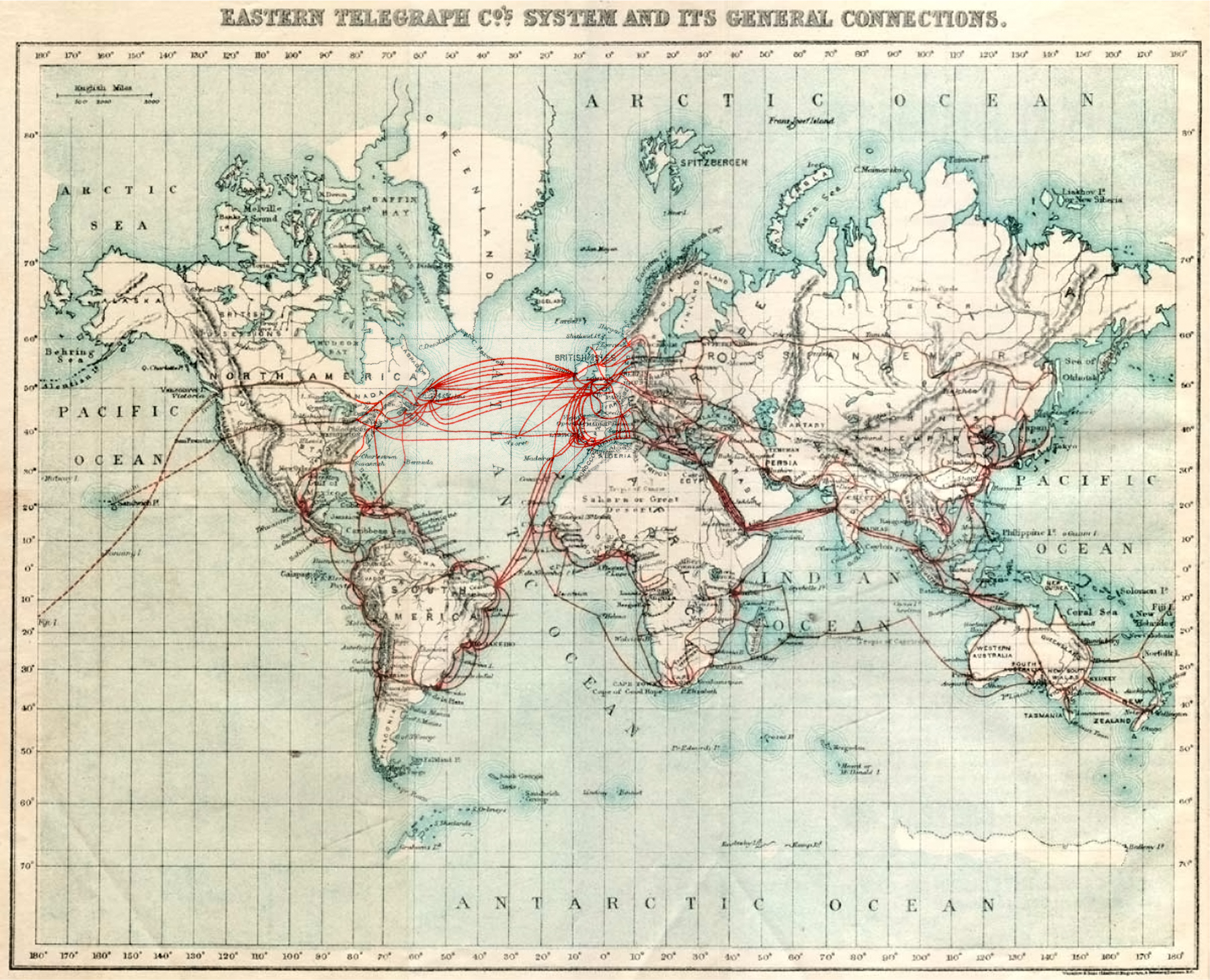
A map of the Eastern Telegraph Company's submarine cables, 1901

In the nineteenth century, the United Kingdom of Great Britain and Ireland had the world's first commercial telegraph company. British telegraphy dominated international telecommunications well into the twentieth. Telegraphy is the sending of textual messages by human operators using symbolic codes. Electrical telegraphy used conducting wires to send messages, typically incorporating a telegram service to deliver the telegraphed communication from the telegraph office. This is distinct from optical telegraphy that preceded it and the radiotelegraphy that followed. Though Francis Ronalds first demonstrated a working telegraph over a substantial distance in 1816, he was unable to put it into practical use. Starting in 1836, William Fothergill Cooke, with the scientific assistance of Charles Wheatstone, developed the Cooke and Wheatstone telegraph. The needle telegraph instrument suggested by Wheatstone, the battery invented by John Frederic Daniell, and the relay invented by Edward Davy were important components of this system.

In 1846, Cooke and financier John Lewis Ricardo formed the Electric Telegraph Company which initially supplied telegraph systems to railway companies, but soon branched out into other businesses, slowly building a network that could be used by the public. Many competing companies arose, the most important of which was the Magnetic Telegraph Company (the "Magnetic") formed in 1850. They used the telegraph invented by William Thomas Henley, which did not require batteries. The Electric and Magnetic companies soon formed a cartel to control the market. They were profitable, but most other companies were not.

Submarine telegraph cables were required to extend the telegraph beyond mainland Britain. Suitable insulation for these was unavailable until Scottish military surgeon William Montgomerie introduced gutta-percha in 1843. The Submarine Telegraph Company laid the world's first international submarine cable in 1851 connecting England with France. In 1864, John Pender formed the Telegraph Construction and Maintenance Company to manufacture and maintain the transatlantic telegraph cable for the Atlantic Telegraph Company. He formed many additional companies to lay various cables connecting Britain with its colonies in India, the Far East and Australia. Once they were laid, these disparate companies were merged into the Eastern Telegraph Company, established in 1872. In 1934, Cable & Wireless Ltd absorbed the company.

The inland telegraph companies were nationalised in 1870 and then operated as part of the General Post Office. Companies operating international submarine cables remained independent. A major mistake made during nationalisation was cost estimates failed to take into account the cost of purchasing railway company wayleaves, or even that it would be necessary to do so. The final bill far exceeded the original estimate. The telegraph was never profitable under nationalisation because of government policies. Prices were held low to make it affordable for as many people as possible, and the telegraph was extended to every post office issuing money orders, whether or not that office generated enough telegraph business to be profitable. Telegraph usage increased enormously under the Post Office, but it was never as cheap as the postal service, and growing competition from the telephone reduced its market share.

The telegraph was an important resource in both world wars, delaying its decline. The introduction of special greetings telegrams in 1935 proved highly popular and somewhat offset a further decline, but by 1970, telegram usage had fallen to its lowest total ever under nationalisation. Repeated price increases to control the deficit drove usage down even further. Post Office Telecommunications was separated from the Post Office as British Telecom in 1981. This was a first step towards its privatisation in 1984. In 1982 British Telecom ended its inland telegram service. International telegrams could be sent by telephone and were received by ordinary letter post. Some private wire use of telegraph continued after the end of the telegram service, and the telex system continued in use by an ever-diminishing group of private users. Most of these succumbed to alternatives on the Internet in the 1990s.

== Early development ==
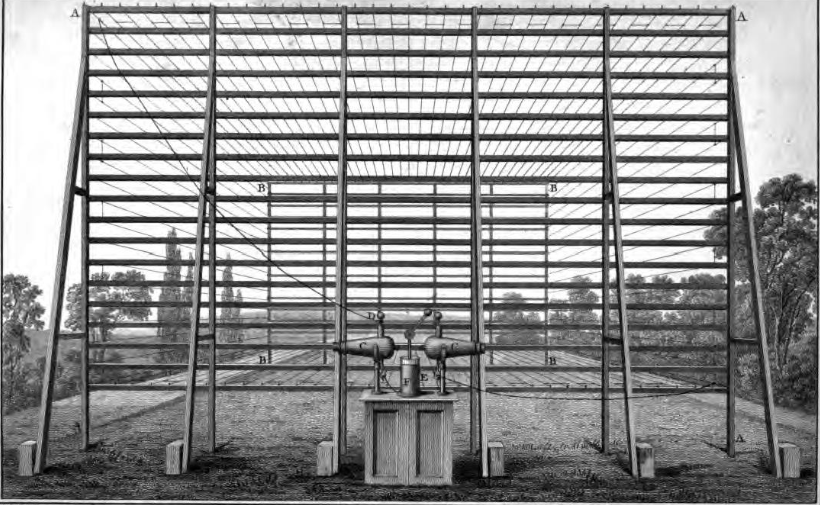
Ronalds' eight miles of iron wire strung in his garden

Francis Ronalds conducted the first demonstration that an electric telegraph could be operated over a substantial distance in his Hammersmith garden in 1816. He used eight miles of iron wire strung between wooden frames. High-voltage friction machines were his power source. Ronalds offered his system to the Admiralty. They were already using an optical telegraph, and despite it being frequently unusable because of weather, saw no need for his invention. Though never put to the test, it is unlikely that Ronalds' system would have worked over very long distances using static electricity generators. Even the relatively short test system only worked well in dry weather.

Nearly all the successful telegraph systems used extensive electrochemical cells as their power source. The invention of the Daniell cell in 1836 by John Frederic Daniell made this possible. The earlier voltaic pile suffered from falling voltage if used continuously because of the formation of hydrogen bubbles around the copper electrode which tended to insulate it. The Daniell cell solved this problem by placing the zinc and copper electrodes in separate electrolytes with a porous barrier between them. The sulfuric acid electrolyte consumed the hydrogen oxidizing it to water, before it could reach the copper electrode in the copper sulphate electrolyte. A later improvement by J. F. Fuller in 1853 replaced sulfuric acid with zinc sulfate.

Another important development was the relay, invented by surgeon Edward Davy in 1837 and patented in 1838. It allowed the regeneration of weak telegraph pulses. The incoming pulse activated an electromagnet that moved an armature. Electrical contacts attached to it closed and completed a secondary circuit. A local battery provided the current for a new pulse through the contacts and onwards along the telegraph line. Davy's relay was the first device to use metallic make-and-break contacts, a great improvement on electrodes dipping into a container of mercury. The relay's importance was it allowed telegraph transmissions over long distances that would otherwise require operators at intermediate stations to read and retransmit the message. Davy began experimenting in telegraphy in 1835, and in 1837, demonstrated his telegraph system in Regent's Park over a mile of copper wire. He held an exhibition in London, but after his marriage broke down, he abandoned telegraphy and emigrated to Australia.

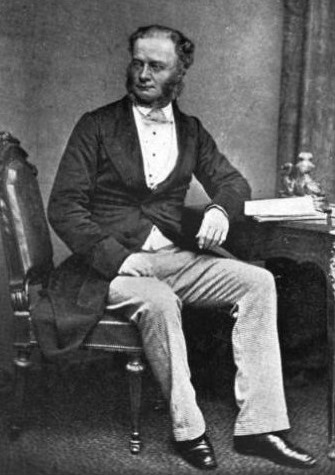
William Fothergill Cooke

William Fothergill Cooke was the driving force in establishing the telegraph as a business in the United Kingdom. Inspired to build a telegraph after seeing Georg Wilhelm Muncke demonstrate a needle telegraph in March 1836, Cooke built a prototype shortly afterwards but did not pursue this design. He looked for mechanical solutions instead because he believed (wrongly) that the needle telegraph would require multiple wires, each driving a separate needle. Cooke initially made a telegraph with a clockwork detent mechanism operating electromagnets. The first mechanical apparatus was built in 1836. He pitched the telegraph to various railway companies as a means of signalling to control trains without success. Cooke, who was not scientifically trained, sought advice from Michael Faraday and Charles Wheatstone. Wheatstone recommended using a needle telegraph system. After the collaboration with Wheatstone had begun, they pursued only needle telegraphs. The Cooke and Wheatstone telegraph they developed and patented in May 1837 could have various arrangements of needles, but the one that initially succeeded used five needles. They were operated in pairs, so they pointed to a letter of the alphabet marked on a board.

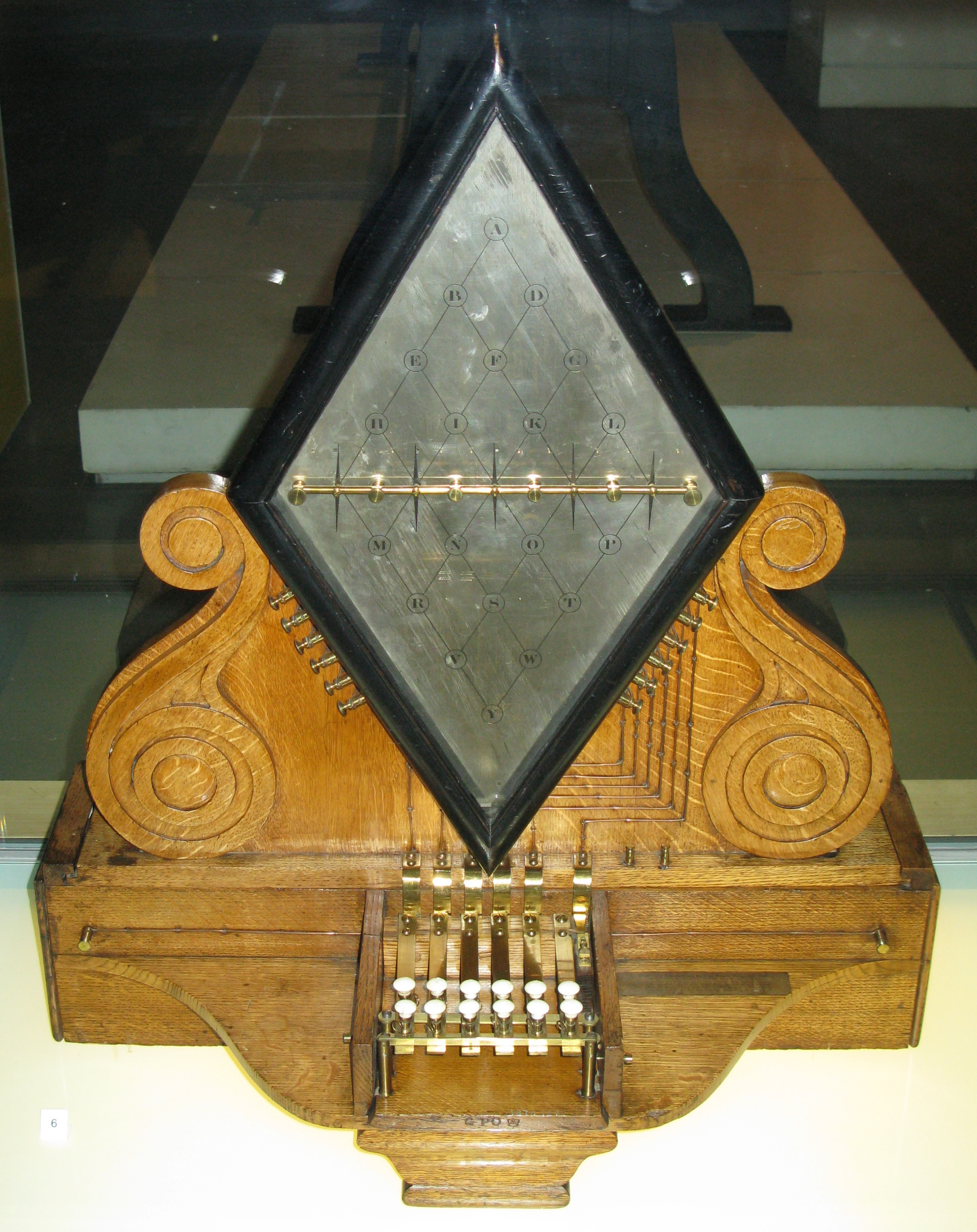
Cooke and Wheatstone five-needle telegraph

Cooke proposed the Cooke and Wheatstone system to the Liverpool and Manchester Railway, and the London and Birmingham Railway trialled a four-needle system in July 1837. Both applications were for signalling rope-hauled trains; both railways rejected them in favour of steam-driven whistles. Their first success came in 1838 when the Great Western Railway installed a five-needle telegraph from Paddington station to West Drayton—the first commercial telegraph in the world. The cables were originally laid in an underground conduit, but the insulation began to fail. Cooke replaced the instruments with a two-needle system using only the wires that remained intact. The code for the two-needle system could not be read off a board; it had to be learned. The profession of telegraph operator (telegraphist) had been created.

In 1843, the telegraph line was extended to Slough and Cooke converted it to a one-needle system. New uninsulated wires were run suspended from poles on ceramic insulators, a system Cooke patented, which rapidly became ubiquitous. Cooke financed this extension as the Great Western was unwilling to finance a system it considered experimental. Up to this point, they had insisted on exclusive use and had refused Cooke permission to open public telegraph offices. Cooke's new agreement gave the railway free use of the system in exchange for the right to open public offices, establishing a public telegraph service for the first time. A flat rate of one shilling (5decimal pence) was charged regardless of message length; many people paid this just to see the strange equipment.

The earliest machine for sending pictures by telegraph (fax) is credited to Scottish inventor Alexander Bain in 1848. He patented an earlier unbuilt design in 1843. Frederick C. Bakewell demonstrated another fax machine with an improved design at the Great Exhibition in 1851. Bain also invented a chemical printing telegraph. He used a dot-dash code with this machine similar to Morse code, but with different codepoints. The Bain telegraph enjoyed some popularity in the 1850s in England, but when he took it to the US in 1849, he became embroiled in litigation with Samuel Morse. The dispute broke him financially, and he returned to clockmaking, his original profession, in later life.

== Telegraph companies ==
Development of the telegraph in Britain was distinctly different from that in other European countries. In Continental Europe, governments developed the telegraph for their own purposes and controlled them as a state monopoly. For instance, Siemens early telegraph installations in Prussia had a distinctly military purpose. In France, it was years before the public could use the telegraph. In Britain, between 1846, the formation of the first telegraph company, until nationalisation in 1870, the telegraph grew entirely at the instigation of private companies using private capital and without government support. 64 telegraph companies were formed during that time, though 68% of them failed and only a handful of them grew to any significant size.

=== Electric Telegraph Company ===
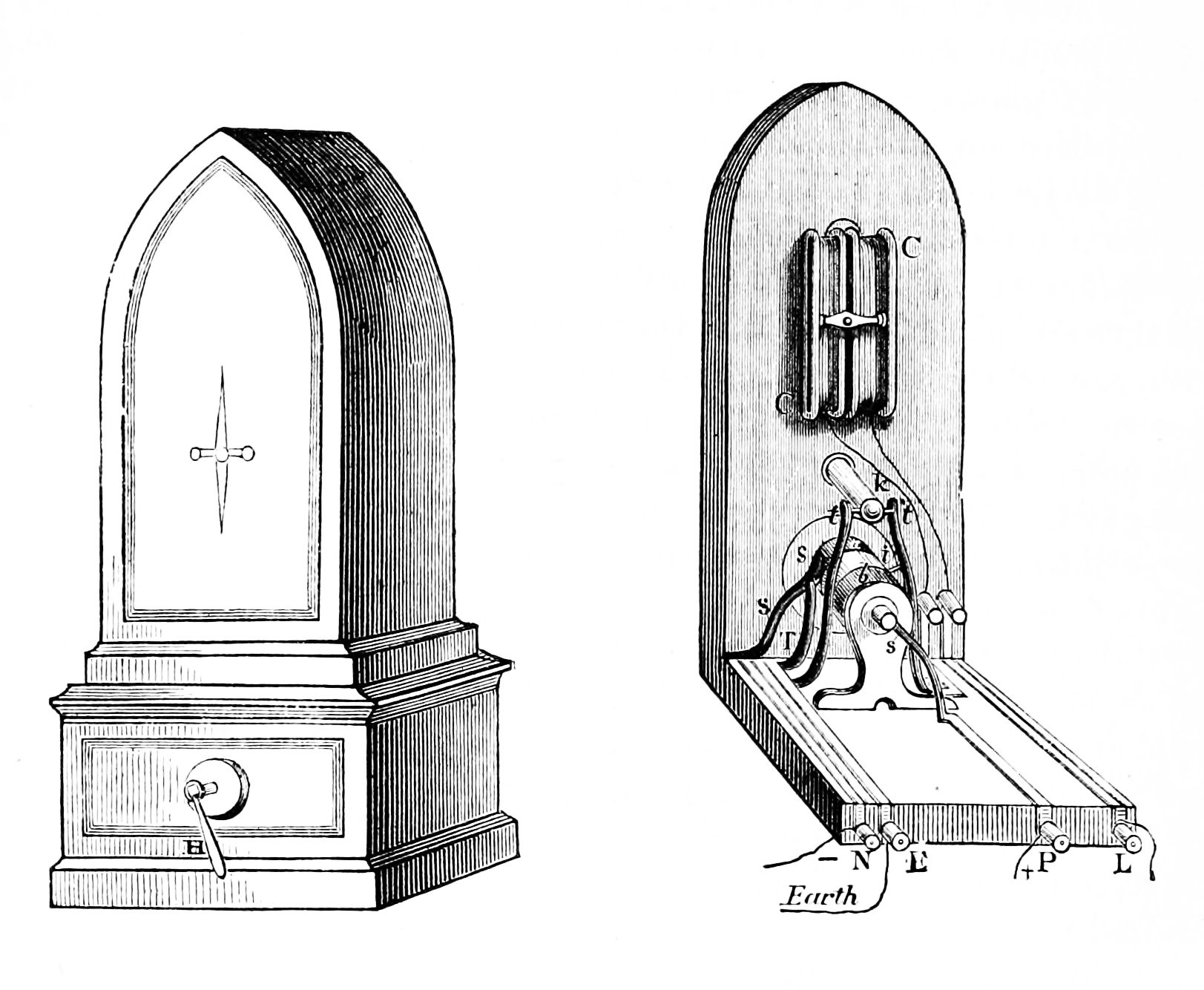
Cooke and Wheatstone single-needle instrument c. 1872–1873

Cooke and financier John Lewis Ricardo established the Electric Telegraph Company (ETC) in 1846, the first company formed to provide a telegraph service to the public. Wheatstone was not involved, having had a falling out with Cooke over who should take credit for the invention. The matter went to arbitration with Marc Isambard Brunel acting for Cooke and Daniell acting for Wheatstone. They reached a compromise with both taking some credit. Wheatstone had no interest in commercial enterprises, wishing only to publish scientific results. The ETC bought out Wheatstone's patent interest in exchange for royalties, and acquired Davy's relay patent. They bought out Bain for the substantial sum of £7,500 (equivalent to £1,040,000 in 2024) after he had threatened to derail the bill forming the company because his patents would be infringed. The ETC bought out other telegraph patents when they could, often not because they wanted to use them, but to suppress competition.

The company concentrated on their railway business first, but struggled to be profitable. Their relationship with the railways, however, gave them a structural advantage over competitors that started up later. By the time they arrived on the scene, the ETC had agreements with most railways, which gave them exclusive use of the wayleaves, shutting out their competitors from the most economical way of building a telegraph network.

After 1848, other areas of the business grew. Supplying news to newspapers and stock exchange information to the financial sector was profitable. The insurer Lloyd's of London was a major user from the start. They had telegraph instruments installed directly in their London offices in 1851. Telegraph use by the public was slow to grow because of high prices, but increased after competition drove down prices. This led to the company relocating their London central office to bigger premises in Great Bell Alley, Moorgate, in 1859. The eastern portion of the road was later renamed Telegraph Street after the company. The ETC remained by far the largest telegraph company until nationalisation in 1870, after which Cooke retired. Both he and Wheatstone were knighted for their services to telegraphy in 1869 and 1868, respectively.

The ETC was heavily involved in laying submarine telegraph cables to Europe and Ireland. They operated the first cable ship permanently fitted out for laying cables, CS Monarch. In 1853, they created the International Telegraph Company to overcome Dutch objections to a British company laying telegraph cables on their soil. The company was merged back into the ETC in 1854 and called the Electric and International Telegraph Company. Other subsidiary companies created to lay submarine cables were the Channel Islands Telegraph Company (1857) and the Isle of Man Telegraph Company (1859).

=== Magnetic Telegraph Company ===
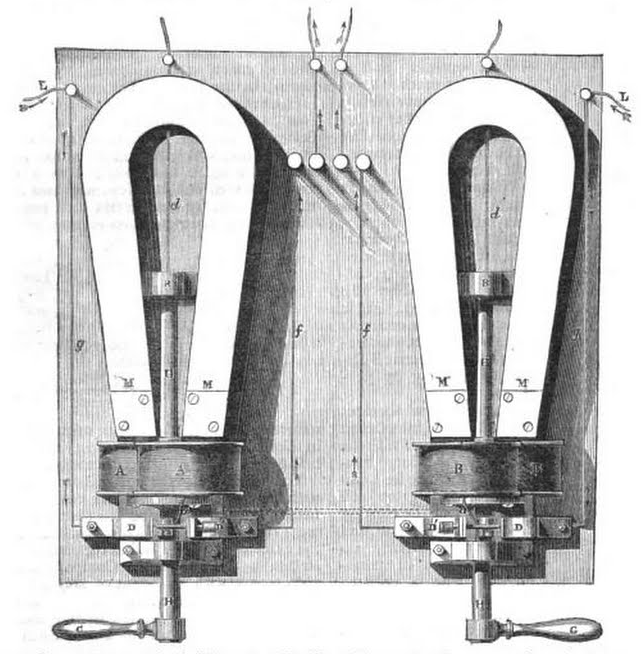
Henley-Foster two-needle telegraph

John Watkins Brett established the English and Irish Magnetic Telegraph Company (Magnetic Telegraph Company, or "Magnetic" for short) in 1850, initially to connect Britain and Ireland with a submarine telegraph cable. The first attempt failed, as did several attempts by rival companies. The Magnetic finally succeeded in 1853, giving Ireland a telegraphic connection to Britain for the first time, and through Britain to mainland Europe. This was the deepest submarine cable laid to date.

The Magnetic was the ETC's largest competitor. Both formed a virtual duopoly. In this context, the ETC was commonly referred to as the Electric to counterpose it to the Magnetic. The Magnetic was not, however, the Electric's first competitor. The British Electric Telegraph Company (BETC), founded in 1849, was the first. Its name was later changed to the British Telegraph Company to avoid confusion with the ETC. The BETC failed because they were founded on the mistaken assumption that they could obtain railway wayleaves. They wrongly believed Parliament would force the railway companies to allow them to construct lines. They obtained very few wayleaves; one exception was the Lancashire and Yorkshire Railway. Magnetic took them over in 1857 under the new name of the British and Irish Magnetic Telegraph Company. The Magnetic avoided the pitfalls encountered by the BETC. From the start, they planned their system based on underground cables along highways. Not only did the ETC have the railway wayleaves, but the United Kingdom Telegraph Company had the wayleaves for canals and the BETC had the wayleaves for overground cables along highways. This asset of the BETC was the attraction for the Magnetic in its takeover of both.

The Magnetic used a telegraph system not covered by ETC's patents—William Thomas Henley and George Foster's needle telegraph, which did not require batteries. While the operator was sending a message, the handle's movement generated the electricity electromagnetically. This was the meaning of "magnetic" in the company name. After the BETC takeover, the Magnetic acquired its founder Henry Highton's needle telegraph. This instrument was the cheapest of the manual telegraph systems at between £2 10 shillings (£2.50) and £3 (equivalent to £370 in 2024). By the time of nationalisation, the Magnetic were also using Bright's bells on their most important lines. Charles Tilston Bright invented this instrument, which was acoustic rather than visual, allowing the operator to work faster.

Not only did the Magnetic lay the first cable to Ireland, they had an exclusive agreement with the Submarine Telegraph Company which controlled the cables to Europe. For a short time, the Magnetic had control of all international traffic, shutting out the ETC. It acquired most of the railway wayleaves in Ireland, forcing the ETC to use roads and canals, the exact opposite of the situation in Great Britain.

=== London District Telegraph Company ===
London District Telegraph Company (the District), formed in 1859 in London, was closely associated with the Magnetic. John Watkins Brett and Charles Kemp Dyer were directors of both companies; Edward Brailsford Bright was secretary of both. Their telegraph operators were trained at the Magnetic's headquarters in the Strand. The Magnetic installed the telegraph lines for the District and leased them back for a peppercorn rent in exchange for the District passing on the Magnetic's messages to and from outside London. The District's business model was to provide cheap telegrams within London and not install expensive links between cities. Prices were fourpence (1.7p) for ten words and sixpence (2.5p) for fifteen. By comparison, a long distance telegram on the Electric cost four shillings (20p). The District's area was limited to within four miles (6.4 km) of Charing Cross, with possible later expansion to 20 miles (32 km). The District avoided the expense of constructing telegraph poles or burying cables by stringing the wires from building to building, a technique that could only be used in heavily built-up areas.

Rooftop wires may have been cheap to install, but getting the wayleaves could be troublesome. Thousands of individual permissions had to be obtained, and odd conditions were sometimes imposed. One householder insisted the installers enter her property only once (after wiping their feet) to access the roof. Meals were hoisted up to the workmen on rooftops until they had finished. Around seven thousand interviews and negotiations were conducted, many of them equally troublesome, to construct only 280 miles (450 km) of wire. The District's cheap prices stimulated a much more casual use of the telegraph. In 1862, the company transmitted a quarter of a million messages.

=== United Kingdom Telegraph Company ===
United Kingdom Electric Telegraph Company's Act 1851
- Act of Parliament
- Parliament of the United Kingdom
- Long title: An Act for enabling the United Kingdom Electric Telegraph Company to purchase and work certain Letters Patent.
- Citation: 14 & 15 Vict. c. cxxxvii
- Territorial extent: United Kingdom

Dates
- Royal assent: 7 August 1851
- Commencement: 7 August 1851 (Note: The Acts of Parliament (Commencement) Act 1793.)

Status: Current legislation

United Kingdom Electric Telegraph Act 1862 (Note: Section 82.)
- Act of Parliament
- Parliament of the United Kingdom
- Long title: An Act to enable the United Kingdom Electric Telegraph Company (Limited) to carry on the Works and Business of an Electric Telegraph Company.
- Citation: 25 & 26 Vict. c. cxxxi
- Territorial extent: England and Wales; Scotland; Ireland; (Note: Section 80.)

Dates
- Royal assent: 7 July 1862
- Commencement: 7 July 1862

Status: Current legislation

Text of statute as originally enacted

The United Kingdom Telegraph Company (UKTC), founded by Thomas Allan, was the last major telegraph company to be formed. Registered in 1850, it did not raise sufficient capital to launch until 1860. The business model was to charge a flat rate of one shilling (5p) for twenty words within 100 miles (160 km) and two shillings (10p) beyond this, undercutting the established companies. The Electric, with the Magnetic's support, put a great deal of effort into obstructing the UKTC, challenging their right to use highways in Parliament. This was unresolved until Parliament passed the United Kingdom Electric Telegraph Act 1862 (25 & 26 Vict. c. cxxxi), allowing the UKTC to construct trunk lines along highways. The Electric used their exclusive agreements with the railways to demand they cut down UKTC lines crossing railway property, a demand with which the railway companies mostly complied. The Electric also petitioned other landowners to exclude the UKTC. UKTC lines were sometimes cut illegally. All this activity made it extremely difficult for the UKTC to establish trunk routes between cities. They had one good option—exclusive rights along canals, but they could not reach Scotland or Ireland this way.

The UKTC completed their first trunk line in 1863 connecting London, Birmingham, Manchester, and Liverpool. In 1864, a second trunk ran along the route from London, to Northampton, Leicester, Sheffield, Barnsley, and Wakefield, ending in Hull. The northern end of this line was linked to Manchester and Liverpool, connecting the two trunks together at both ends. Later, UKTC extended the trunk network into Scotland, reaching Glasgow and Edinburgh. In 1865, the network was extended west, reaching Swansea and Plymouth. In 1858, the UKTC laid a cable from Newbiggin to Jutland, Denmark, which was extended to Russia giving the UK direct telegraph access to North European and Scandinavian countries.

The UKTC used the printing telegraph of David Edward Hughes. This was an early form of teleprinter that printed the message directly without the operator needing to decode it. Transmission was from a piano-like keyboard marked with the letters of the alphabet. The system had been offered to the Electric in 1858, but they rejected it. The operation of the printing telegraph was mechanical. A spinning wheel with the character types, similar to a modern daisy wheel printer, was pressed against the paper at the appropriate time. The wheel in the receiving machine had to be kept in exact synchrony with the sending machine, otherwise the result would be unreadable. The Hughes machine did this by sending synchronisation pulses down the line, a marked improvement over earlier machines which were slow and temperamental.

=== Universal Private Telegraph Company ===
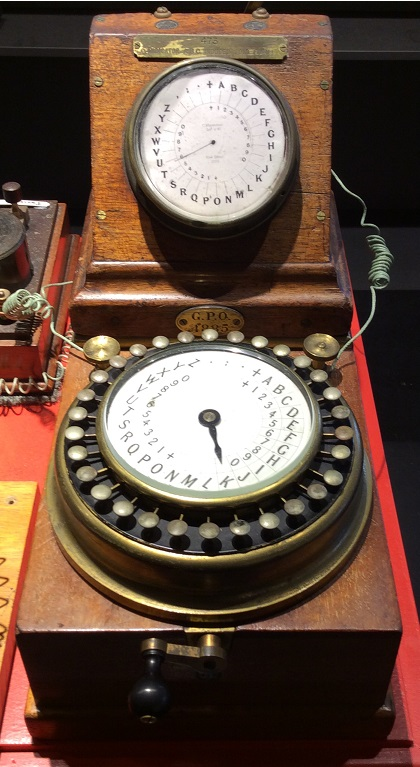
An ABC telegraph instrument from the General Post Office era, dated 1885

The Universal Private Telegraph Company (UPTC) was established in 1861 to provide private telegraph links for companies and institutions. They used the ABC telegraph, also known as Wheatstone's universal telegraph, an instrument patented by Charles Wheatstone in 1858. It was designed to be used by unskilled operators with no knowledge of telegraph codes. Letters were marked around a dial with a button for each. The operator pressed the desired button and then turned a handle which generated pulses of current. These pulses moved a pointer through successive positions until it reached the button that had been pressed, at which point the current was cut off. A receiving dial indicated the position that had been reached at both ends of the circuit. Although much slower than other telegraph systems, it was possible to reach 25 wpm with practice.

The company proved to be highly profitable. It charged £4 per mile of wire per annum and had few overheads. Unlike the public companies, it did not have to staff telegraph offices or employ operators to send and receive messages.

== Profitability ==
Of the inland public companies, only the ETC and the Magnetic were profitable. The District, with its low prices, suffered a loss every year of its existence except 1865. The UKTC, a later start up, hoped to take business away from the big two with low prices, but they were handicapped by an inability to obtain wayleaves on the best routes. The resulting price war ended with them joining the ETC/Magnetic cartel and agreeing a common price structure, destroying their original business model.

Competition from the District and UKTC, together with economies of scale as the network grew, steadily drove down prices. In 1851, the ETC charged ten shillings (50p) for a twenty-word inland telegram over 100 miles (160 km). This fell to four shillings (20p) in 1855, but was still expensive for a typical Victorian worker to use. A weaver, for instance, earned on average ten shillings and sixpence (52.5p) per week in 1855. Further reductions occurred in the early 1860s, with both the ETC and the Magnetic trying to compete with the UKTC's flat one shilling rate. The ETC stopped charging for the address as part of the message, reducing the cost further. In 1865, the ETC, Magnetic and UKTC fixed a common scale of charges for all three companies. The flat rate was dropped and a twenty-word message cost one shilling (5p) up to 100 miles (160 km), one shilling and sixpence (7.5p) up to 200 miles (320 km), and two shillings (10p) up to 300 miles (480 km). Local messages within London and large towns were sixpence (2.5p).

The falling prices stimulated more traffic as the public used the telegraph for mundane everyday messages. This generated a steep increase in profits. Between 1861 and 1866, the combined net profits of the ETC and Magnetic rose from £99,000 to £178,000. This was not due solely to the increasing size of the network, the gross income per mile of wire was also increasing.

== News service ==
The telegraph companies offered a news service useful to regional newspapers, which would otherwise have received the information some time after an event. The ETC had a staff of news gathering journalists and by 1854 had 120 newspaper customers. News items included political news from Parliament, stock exchange prices, and sports news, especially horse racing where race results were wanted quickly. Until telegraph offices were opened directly at the racetrack, (Newmarket did not get one until 1860) a fast rider took the results to the nearest telegraph office. In places where the office was in line of sight, the results could be signalled to an observer with a telescope at the office, but only in clear weather.

In 1859, the ETC and Magnetic entered into an exclusive agreement with Reuters to supply foreign news. Reuters retained the right to supply shipping and commercial news directly to private subscribers in the London region. In 1865, the ETC, Magnetic, and UKTC formed a combined news service, leaving only one source of news by telegraph. This monopoly irritated the newspapers, and some campaigned vigorously against the telegraph companies. This control of the news became an argument for nationalisation of the telegraph system.

== Submarine cables ==
To connect the telegraph to anywhere outside Britain, submarine telegraph cables were needed. The lack of a good insulator held back their development. Rubber was tried, but degraded in salt water. The solution came with gutta-percha, a natural latex from trees of the genus Palaquium in the Far East. It sets harder than rubber when exposed to air, but when soaked in hot water, it becomes plastic and mouldable. It rehardens upon cooling. William Montgomerie, the head of the medical department in Singapore, brought the material to the attention of the Royal Society in 1843 when he sent samples of Gutta-percha to them. Montgomerie thought of using the material, in place of rubber which deteriorated rapidly in damp tropical conditions, to make medical equipment. After testing some samples, Michael Faraday recognised its potential for underwater cables.

Wheatstone introduced plans in the House of Commons for submarine cables as early as 1840. In 1844–1845, he tested (probably short) lengths of cable in Swansea Bay. He tried various insulations, including gutta-percha, but he could not find a suitable way of applying it to long runs of cable.

=== Cable manufacturing companies ===
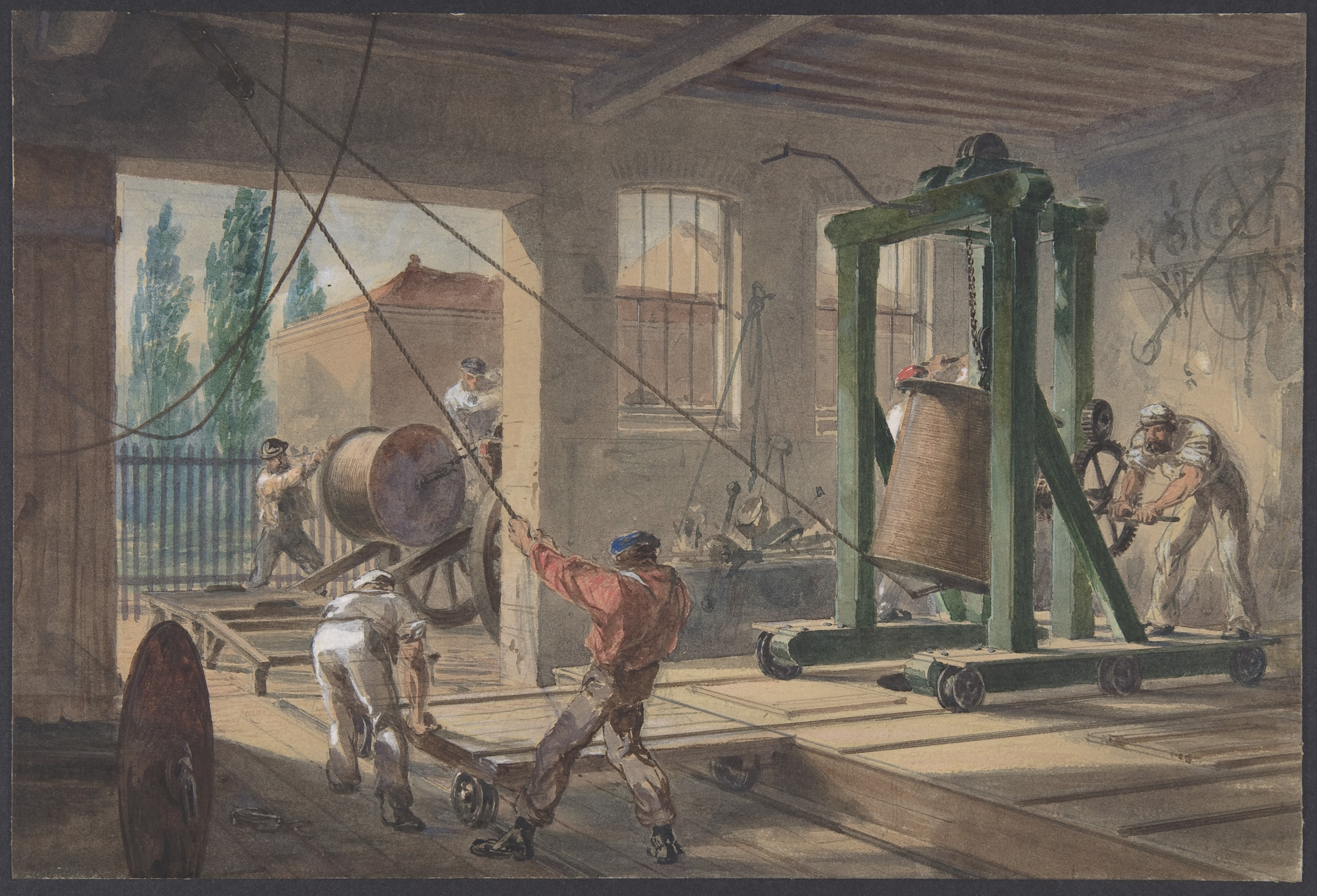
Telcon cable works at Greenwich, 1865–1866

The Gutta Percha Company was founded in 1845 to exploit the new material. They initially made bottle stoppers, but soon expanded to a wide range of products. In 1848, upon hearing of its potential use for telegraph cables, the firm modified a machine for extruding gutta-percha tubing into one capable of continuously applying gutta-percha to a copper conductor. Up to 1865, the Gutta Percha Company, which had a monopoly on the supply of the material, made nearly all the cores for submarine cables in the UK. S. W. Silver and Co. in Silvertown, London, made waterproof clothing using rubber and gutta-percha. In 1864, an offshoot of Silver and Co., the India Rubber, Gutta Percha and Telegraph Works Company, was founded as a rival cable manufacturer.

Some early submarine cables were laid with just their insulation for protection. This was often unsuccessful. The cables were easily damaged and some attempts to lay them failed because they would not sink. The configuration found to work well was to twist the cable cores together, bind them with tarred hemp, wind a tarred cord around the whole group of cores, and then protect the assembled cores with iron wires twisted around them. The Gutta Percha Company never made completed cables of this sort, sending them to another company for finishing instead. These companies were specialists in the manufacturing of wire rope. R.S. Newall and Company in Tyne and Wear, Glass, Elliot & Company, and W. T. Henley in London. were the principal companies involved in this early work. In 1864, the Gutta Percha Company merged with Glass, Elliot to form the Telegraph Construction and Maintenance Company (Telcon). John Pender instigated this becoming chairman. Pender, with a consortium including Thomas Brassey and Daniel Gooch, bought the SS Great Eastern, a huge, failing passenger ship built by Isambard Kingdom Brunel. They converted it into a cable layer. Telcon chartered the ship using it on some of the major cable installations around the world.

By 1880, cable production was centred on the banks of the Thames in East London. Telcon was the major supplier, with some work subcontracted to W. T. Henley at North Woolwich, a major manufacturer of electrical equipment with a 16.5-acre (6.7 ha) site. Gutta-percha production was near-monopolised by the India Rubber, Gutta Percha and Telegraph Works Company, by then a subsidiary of Telcon, at their 15-acre (6.1 ha) site in Silvertown. The company operated several cable ships, of which the Silvertown was the largest in the world. Siemens also had a cable manufacturing facility at Woolwich. Exports were a large part of the business totalling over £2 million in 1873—one per cent of total British manufactured exports.

=== Ocean cable companies ===
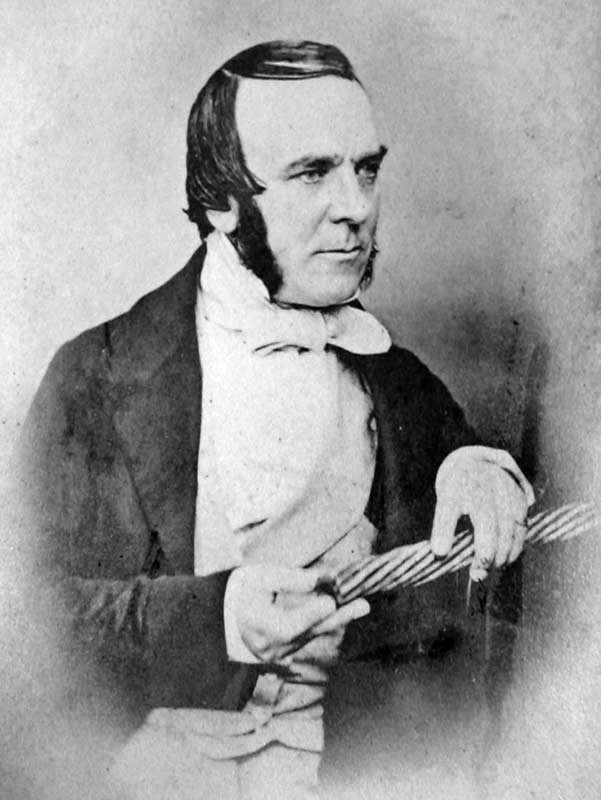
John Brett c. 1850s

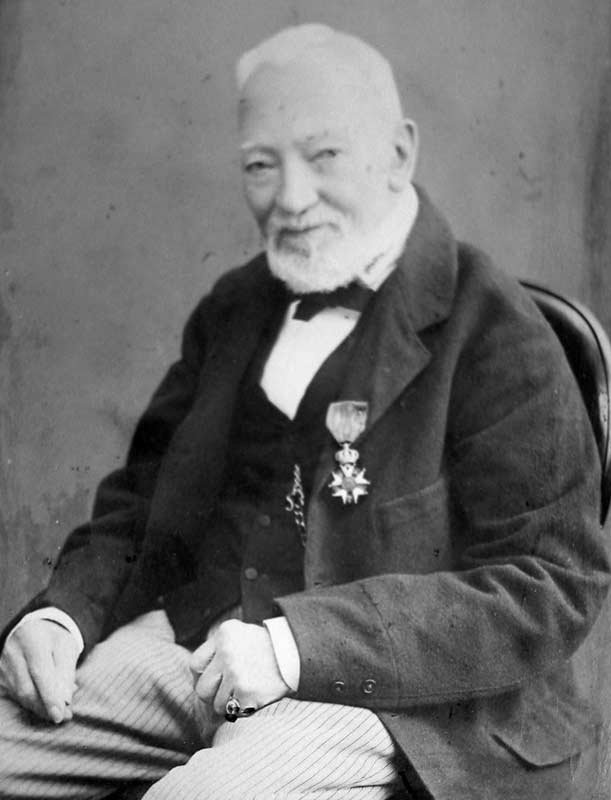
Jacob Brett in later life

The world's first ocean cable was laid across the English Channel. Jacob and John Watkins Brett had been planning such a cable since 1847. In 1849, the South Eastern Railway Company conducted a trial of two miles (3.2 km) of cable made by the Gutta Percha Company from the ship Princess Clementine anchored off Folkestone. The ship could send telegraph messages directly to London via a connection to the South Eastern's overhead telegraph line. After several failed attempts, the Bretts' company, the Submarine Telegraph Company (STC), succeeded in connecting to France in 1851. The company went on to lay many other cables to European countries.

The Magnetic had a close relationship with the STC. From about 1857, the two companies had an agreement that all STC submarine cables were to be used only with the Magnetic's landlines. The Magnetic also controlled the first cable to Ireland. This control of international traffic gave them a significant advantage in the domestic market. Both Newall and Glass, Elliot laid cables as subcontractors to the inland telegraph companies. Newall was prone to fall out with his customers and was often involved in litigation resulting in the company slowly moving away from the telegraph cable business.

The British government took a strong interest in the provision of international telegraph connections. Government assistance to telegraph projects included the provision of Royal Navy ships to assist with cable laying and monetary guarantees. Two major failures gave them cause for concern—the first transatlantic telegraph cable, laid in 1858 by the Atlantic Telegraph Company, and the Red Sea to India cable in 1859 laid by the Red Sea & India Company. The transatlantic cable's insulation failed after a few weeks. The cable to India (manufactured and laid by Newall) was too thin and laid taut over underwater peaks which soon broke it in multiple places. The guarantees provided by the government for these two ventures led to a financial loss. In response, a government committee was formed in 1859 to investigate the issue. In their final report in 1861, the committee concluded that future failures of this kind were avoidable now that the technology was better understood. They recommended specifications for future cable construction, installation, and maintenance. After the Red Sea failure, the government no longer provided subsidies or guarantees and left it to private companies to assume the risk of new ventures entirely.

Getting a telegraph connection to India was a priority for the government after the Indian Mutiny of 1857. The urgent telegram requesting assistance had taken forty days to reach London. The telegraph went only as far as the coast of India and from there the message travelled by ship. The failure of the first cable was a significant blow. A connection to India was finally achieved in 1864 after the Indian government had laid a new cable made by W. T. Henley from Karachi to Fao, Iraq, and the using overland routes. This ocean route was a shorter distance than the Red Sea route and in shallower water, but still 1,450 miles (2,330 km). Many times longer than any other submarine cables, this was the first extremely long submarine cable to be a permanent success. The British government believed the telegraph would provide the means for much greater central control of overseas possessions. Colonial officials necessarily had a great deal of latitude for independent action due to the communication delay. The telegraph greatly restricted their independence, although it took some time for embedded attitudes to change.

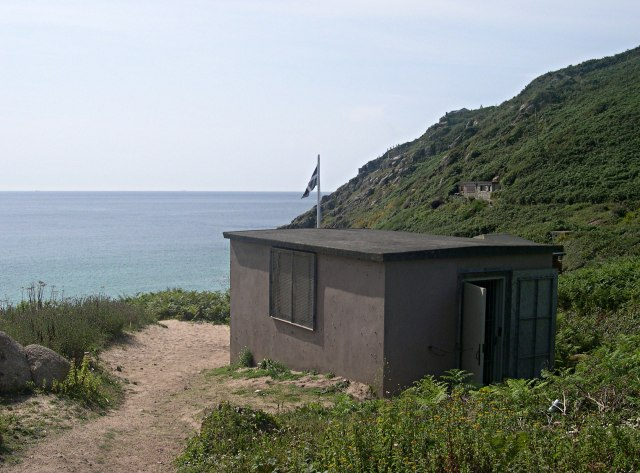
The hut where the Porthcurno cables were landed

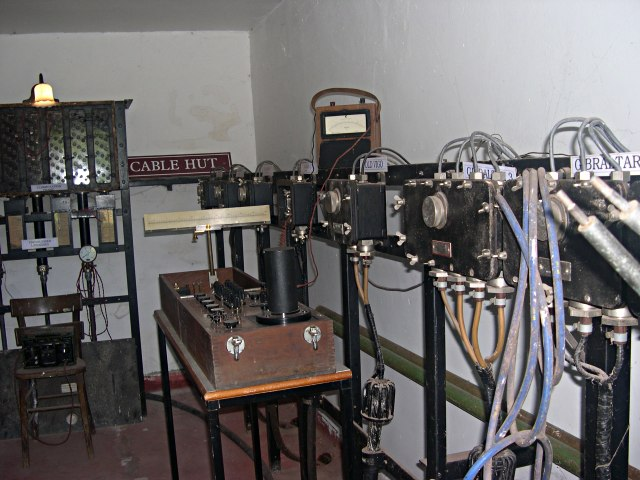
The equipment inside the Porthcurno hut

Pender's motivation in creating Telcon from the merger of Glass, Elliot and the Gutta Percha companies was to create a company that could make and maintain the second transatlantic telegraph cable for the Atlantic Telegraph Company. It was also his motivation for buying Great Eastern, the only ship capable of holding all the required cable. With great difficulty, the transatlantic connection was achieved by 1866, creating a truly worldwide telegraph network. London could now communicate with most other telegraph offices in the world. In 1862, a new submarine cable had been laid from Queenstown in southern Ireland to St David's Head in Wales. When this was connected to the transatlantic landing point at Valentia Bay (opposite Valentia Island), it dramatically reduced the distance transatlantic messages had to travel from Ireland to London from 750 miles (1,210 km) to 285 miles (459 km).

The success of the transatlantic cable triggered the formation of many new companies to lay more submarine cables around the world. Pender founded most of these companies. His first project was to lay a new cable to India that covered most of the distance in international waters. This put it fully under British control, avoiding the political and other risks associated with an overland route. Telcon manufactured the cable and used the Great Eastern to lay it. To limit the risk, Pender founded three companies, each tasked with laying one section of the cable. The Anglo-Mediterranean Company (founded 1868) laid a cable from Malta to Alexandria in Egypt. From there, a short overland cable via Cairo connected to Suez. The Falmouth, Gibraltar and Malta Telegraph Company (founded 1869) connected Malta to Porthcurno, Cornwall, with landings at Gibraltar and Carcavelos, Portugal. The company was so named because Falmouth was originally intended as the landing site in England. The tiny village of Porthcurno became the largest submarine cable station in the world after numerous other cables were landed there. In 1870, the British-Indian Submarine Company (founded 1869) provided the final link from Suez via Aden to Bombay. Once the connection was complete, the three companies were merged as the Eastern Telegraph Company in 1872. James Anderson, the captain of the Great Eastern, was made managing director.

The British-Indian Submarine Extension Company laid a cable going east from India in 1871. This ran from Madras, which was connected overland to Bombay, to Singapore via Penang and Malacca. This met a cable in Singapore laid by the China Submarine Telegraph Company (founded 1869) running to Hong Kong. The British-Australian Telegraph Company (founded 1870) then connected Hong Kong to Port Darwin, Australia, via Java. This was the end point of the Australian Overland Telegraph Line, running 2,000 miles (3,200 km) to Port Augusta in South Australia. The three companies were merged as the Eastern Extension, Australasia and China Telegraph Company in 1873. This company connected Australia to New Zealand in 1876. Other Pender companies included: the Western and Brazilian Telegraph Company (1873), the Brazilian Submarine Telegraph Company (1873), Marseilles, Algiers and Malta Telegraph Company (1870), Eastern & South African Telegraph Company (1879), and the African Direct Telegraph Company (1885). These companies were all merged into the Eastern Telegraph Company, which became the Eastern and Associated Cable Company—the largest multinational of the 19th century.

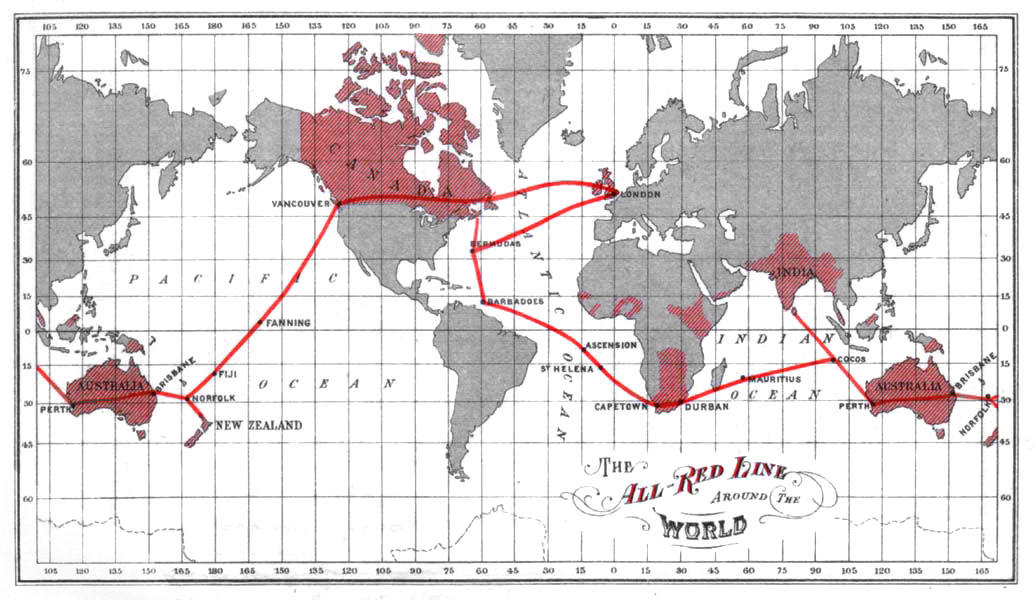
British telegraph All Red Line global network in 1902

The development of the undersea telegraph cable network began in the late nineteenth century. In October 1902, a worldwide network of cables and relay stations—including some 100,000 miles of undersea cables—was inaugurated. Called the All Red Line, because at that time British territories and colonies were usually coloured red or pink on maps, it carried long-distance telecommunications to all parts of the British Empire. The idea was to create a network that did not pass through any non-British territory to avoid security and political risks.

In 1928, British submarine cables still dominated world telecommunications, but they were increasingly under threat from radiotelegraphy. A particular concern was RCA in the US, but they were also losing business because of the Imperial Wireless Chain set up by the British government to connect the empire. The Marconi Wireless Telegraph Company, which was also a competitor outside the Empire, supplied the transmitters for the Imperial Chain. The Electra House Group, an informal alliance of British telecommunication companies, decided that they could best compete worldwide by merging their cable and radio companies into a single entity. Thus, the Eastern Telegraph Company and the Marconi Wireless Company were merged into Imperial and International Communications Ltd, which changed its name to Cable & Wireless Ltd in 1934. The Porthcurno station remained open for exactly one hundred years, closing in 1970 when the last cable was taken out of service. Submarine coaxial cables with repeaters, which carried multiple telephone channels using frequency division multiplexing, had been in use for some time. By then, there was no real need for distinct telegraph cables. Telegraph was declining, and multiple telegraph channels could be multiplexed into a single telephone channel since the 1920s. The Porthcurno Cable Hut where cables were landed is now the Porthcurno Telegraph Museum and the historic archive of Cable & Wireless.

=== Maintenance and technical problems ===
Maintenance costs of submarine cables were high. Ships' anchors frequently damaged them, and their insulation deteriorated over time. They were most at risk in shallow water near the coast, but very deep water was avoided because it was difficult to retrieve cables for repair. In 1868, the expected life of a cable was fifteen years, and most laid to that date had not lasted that long. A similar problem with deteriorating insulation plagued buried inland cables, the Magnetic suffering the most from this.

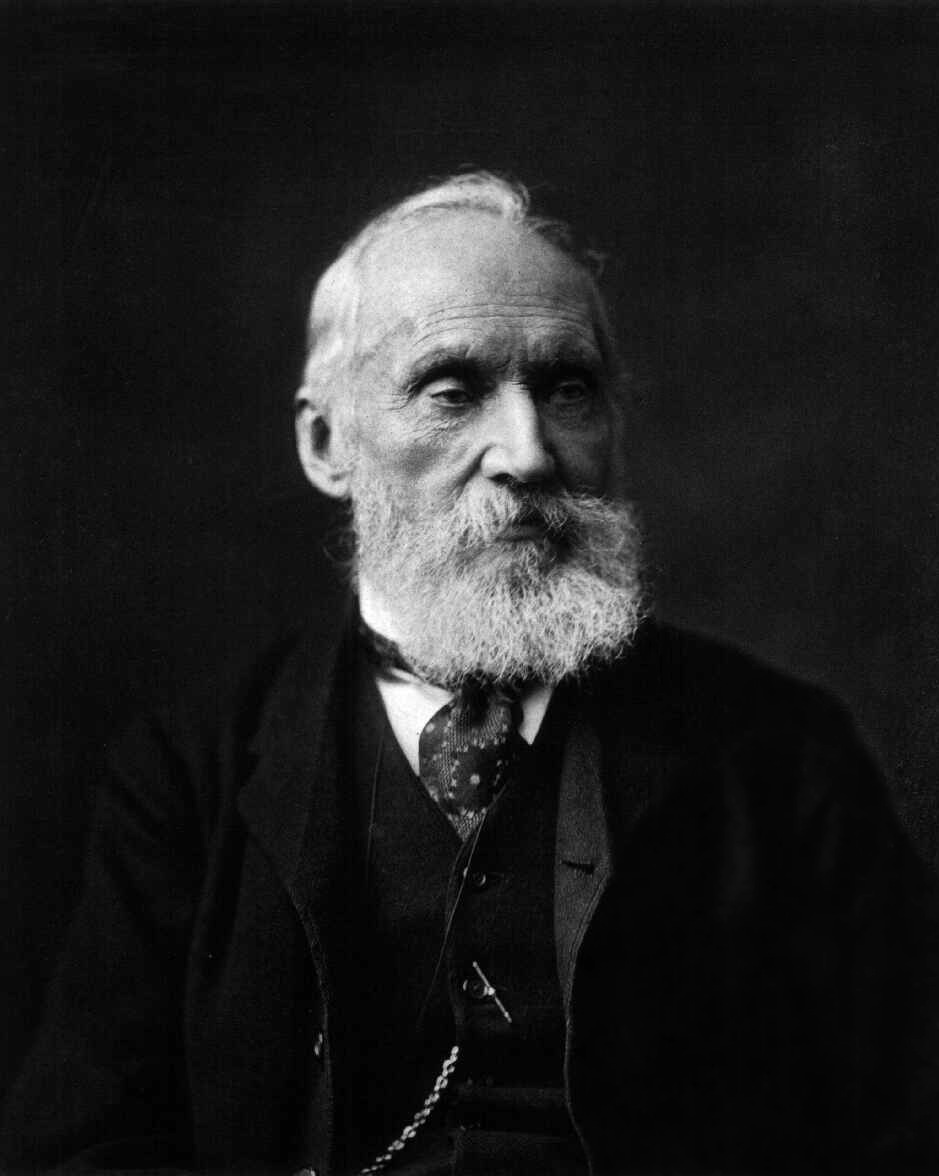
Lord Kelvin gave the first mathematical description of retardation

A recurring problem with buried cables, and most especially submarine cables, was the phenomenon of dispersion, which produces the effect called retardation. Dispersion, as it relates to transmission lines, is different frequency components of a signal travelling along a line at different speeds. Early telegraph engineers did not understand frequency analysis of this sort. The effect of dispersion on a telegraph pulse is to spread it out in time. This is because a rectangular pulse (as used in telegraphy) has multiple frequency components. At the receiving end, it appears as if part of the pulse has been retarded, hence the term. The problem this causes for telegraphy is that adjacent pulses smear into each other, an effect called intersymbol interference by modern engineers, and if severe enough, the message cannot be read. It forces the operator to slow the speed of sending so that there is separation between the pulses. The problem was so bad on the first transatlantic cable in 1858 that transmission speeds were in minutes per word rather than words per minute. Thinking he could solve the problem by using a higher voltage, telegraph engineer Wildman Whitehouse only succeeded in permanently damaging the cable, making it unusable. This failure represented a loss of nearly £2 million (£280 million in 2024)) for the Atlantic Telegraph Company.

Retardation is worse in insulated cables because the electromagnetic wave is travelling mostly in the insulation material. Uninsulated wires on overhead poles, the most common system on overland routes, are largely unaffected, even over long distances. This solution is not open to submarine cables and the very long distances maximise the problem. The problem of retardation was not fully solved until the introduction of long-distance telephony made it essential to do so. However, various mitigating actions were taken. The Magnetic, operating a large number of buried cables, had an instrument that sent a delayed pulse of opposite polarity to the main pulse, cancelling the worst of the retarded signal. The mirror galvanometer designed by Lord Kelvin made it easier to read weak signals, and larger cables with thicker insulation had less retardation.

In 1854, Kelvin produced a mathematical description of retardation by analogy with heat flow after the fiasco with the first transatlantic cable. In 1881, Oliver Heaviside gave the full analysis of transmission lines which described how the problem arose and suggested how it could be resolved by 1887. Heaviside believed that adding the right amount of inductance to the line would completely remove the dispersion effect. He tried to persuade the General Post Office (the Post Office) to take up the idea, but as an outsider—and considered a maverick—he was ignored, largely because of his long-running dispute with William Preece, the Post Office chief electrician (chief engineer). It was left to George Ashley Campbell in the US to implement the idea when he added loading coils to a telephone line for the first time in 1900.

== Employment of women ==
Telegraph companies began employing women as telegraph operators early on in the companies' history. The Magnetic was one of the first to do so and the ETC started employing them from 1855. It was a popular, keenly sought job with unmarried women, who had few other good options for a well-paid job in comfortable surroundings. The ETC paid between ten shillings (50p) and thirty shillings (£1.50) per week and the Magnetic paid a starting rate of ten shillings. The District heavily employed women when it began operating in 1859. New recruits were unpaid until they completed training—typically six weeks. At the end of training, the Magnetic expected trainees to achieve a minimum transmission speed of 10 wpm, 8 wpm at the ETC. Failure to achieve this minimum speed resulted in dismissal.

These wages compared very well with other common occupations for women. A seamstress working at home, for instance, earned about threepence (1.3p) per day. The pay was less than for a male telegraph operator, but compared well with the 35s that a print compositor earned for 63 hours a week. Companies preferred to use women primarily due to their lower pay rate and because they were not organised into unions. Adolescent boys were also employed, but only men worked the night shifts. Employment of women continued after nationalisation. The primary reason was the economic one of lower wages, but a secondary reason was the social class of the women. They usually had a well-educated middle-class background. Only men from an "inferior class" could be employed at the same wage.

== Spread of public use ==
The ability of the telegraph was first brought to the attention of a wider public on 6 August 1844 when The Times reported the birth of Alfred Ernest Albert to Queen Victoria only 40 minutes after it was announced. A second event was even more sensational when John Tawell murdered a woman in Salt Hill (near Slough) and tried to escape by train. His description was telegraphed to Paddington station, and he was arrested shortly after arriving. The event was widely reported in the newspapers.

The 1851 channel cable boosted the telegraph's reputation further. Prices in Paris could be relayed to the London Stock Exchange the same day during opening hours, a hitherto unprecedented ability in international communication. Likewise, news stories in France could be reported promptly to London newspapers. In the same year, the Great Exhibition featured many telegraph instruments which greatly enhanced the public awareness of the telegraph.

The biggest driver of the public take up was the fall in prices. Firstly, through competition between the companies, especially competition with the District, and later price control under nationalisation. By 1860, it had become common to use the telegraph for everyday purposes, especially in areas where a cheap service was available such as the London area covered by the District.

== Nationalisation ==
Thomas Allan was an early advocate of nationalisation in 1854. He believed a flat rate of one shilling (5p) for 20 words regardless of distance would encourage wider use of the telegraph, which would lead to more intensive usage of lines and provide the economic case for building new ones. According to Allen, this could only happen if the Post Office ran the network as a unified whole. He compared his proposal to the effect of the introduction of the Penny Post. Allan later tried to bring about cheaper telegrams through private enterprise by founding the UKTC. A surprising and influential advocate was John Ricardo, co-founder of the ETC. He was a free trade-campaigning Member of Parliament and a railway entrepreneur and banker. Having ended his financial interest in the ETC, in 1861 he wrote a memorandum to William Gladstone, then chancellor of the exchequer and future prime minister, setting out the case for nationalisation. Ricardo's argument was the telegraph was an important government tool for diplomatic, military, and administrative purposes. He pointed out that in all European countries state control had been in place from the beginning. Ricardo estimated that the government could nationalise for £2 million or less.

Telegraph Act 1863 (Note: Section 1.)
- Act of Parliament
- Parliament of the United Kingdom
- Long title: An Act to regulate the Exercise of Powers under Special Acts for the Construction and Maintenance of Telegraphs.
- Citation: 26 & 27 Vict. c. 112
- Territorial extent: United Kingdom

Dates
- Royal assent: 28 July 1863
- Commencement: 28 July 1863
Other legislation
Amended by	Telegraph Act Amendment Act 1866; Statute Law Revision Act 1950; Statute Law Revision (Northern Ireland) Act 1980; British Telecommunications Act 1981; Telecommunications Act 1984; Postal Services Act 2000 (Consequential Modifications No. 1) Order 2001

Status: Partially repealed

Text of statute as originally enacted

Revised text of statute as amended

Text of the Telegraph Act 1863 as in force today (including any amendments) within the United Kingdom, from legislation.gov.uk.

Telegraph Act Amendment Act 1866 (Note: Section 4.)
- Act of Parliament
- Parliament of the United Kingdom
- Long title: An Act to amend the Telegraph Act, 1863.
- Citation: 29 & 30 Vict. c. 3
- Territorial extent: United Kingdom

Dates
- Royal assent: 6 March 1866
- Commencement: 6 March 1866
- Repealed: 25 July 1969
Other legislation
Amends	Telegraph Act 1863
Repealed by	Post Office Act 1969

Status: Repealed

Text of statute as originally enacted

The first sign of government disquiet came when the United Kingdom Electric Telegraph Act 1862 (25 & 26 Vict. c. cxxxi) was passed, enabling the UKTC. The act included provisions to prevent the UKTC selling assets to other companies without permission. This was to discourage the UKTC from joining the emerging cartel in the telegraph industry. A further cause for concern came in 1865 when the companies, including the UKTC, set common tariffs and dropped the one shilling/20-word flat rate. The Telegraph Act 1863 (26 & 27 Vict. c. 112) gave the Board of Trade the power to regulate the telegraph companies on the same basis as other utilities. In 1865, Lord Stanley the postmaster general, came out in favour of nationalisation with Post Office reformer Frank Ives Scudamore leading the campaign. Scudamore pointed out that telegraph offices were often located inconveniently at railway stations outside town, some towns were not served at all, and some had multiple rival companies' offices next to each other. State control in continental countries, according to Scudamore, ensured a more rational and convenient distribution of offices and cheaper rates would lead to greater telegraph use. His opponents pointed to the United States, where rates were also cheaper, but with a great profusion of private companies. Many newspapers campaigned for nationalisation. They were generally dissatisfied with the news service they got from the companies, and they especially resented being unable to choose their own news provider. They wanted the telegraph merely to deliver the product from their chosen supplier.

=== Telegraph Act 1868 ===
By 1866, it was clear the government intended to nationalise the inland telegraph. This had the effect of inhibiting growth of the network. In fact, growth temporarily went backwards that year because of a snowstorm in January, which had damaged every above-ground line within a 50-mile (80 km) radius of London. The rooftop system of the District was put out of action entirely. Across the country, the Electric had 450 miles (720 km) of line damaged. In May, the Panic of 1866 put a further brake on growth. The financial turmoil and the resultant change of government caused a delay, but did not change the policy. In the following year, the Reform Bill took up significant parliamentary time and Scudamore's bill did not come before parliament until 1868. It did not mandate nationalisation or give the Post Office a legal monopoly. It merely gave it the right to set up telegraph services on the same basis as private companies and the ability to purchase private companies or their assets through normal commercial negotiation.

The government had expected the telegraph companies' opposition. They had not expected the railway companies were going to be a problem. In costing the scheme, Scudamore had made no allowance for purchasing railway wayleaves. The railway companies started to oppose the Telegraph Bill vociferously. Many railway telegraph systems were run by the telegraph company that had the wayleave. If the Post Office were to take over the telegraph company, the railway company would, or so they claimed, have the additional expense of running their own telegraph. This difficulty came as a great surprise to the new chancellor, George Ward Hunt. The problem for the Post Office was they could not take over on the same terms as private companies, effectively becoming servants of the railway companies. They wanted the lines, but not the terms that came with them.

The government was determined to reach a decision quickly so that future planning was not left in limbo. Rising company share prices meant any delay would likely add to the costs. In June, the companies began to negotiate, fearing that if they did not, a disadvantageous arrangement would be imposed on them. A select committee under Hunt reached deals with the telegraph companies based on the last twenty years' net profits and compensation for the railway companies. By July, opposition had largely disappeared. The government had originally not planned to nationalise the UPTC because they had no lines for public use; their lines were private wires of no interest to the Post Office. However, the UPTC complained that the planned Post Office uniform rate would damage their business and make it unprofitable. This persuaded Hunt that private wires should also be nationalised. Another problem area was the cables to continental Europe. The Magnetic was obliged to send all continental traffic through STC's cables. The ETC was obliged to use Reuter's Nordeney cable. It would be impossible for a unified nationalised organisation to meet both contractual obligations simultaneously. To solve this, the government purchased Reuter's cables and leased them back to the STC, together with other continental cables acquired by the Post Office. This was done in a great hurry, and the government admitted afterwards it had not been ideal. Reuters and STC were to remain un-nationalised. Parliament passed the bill into law as the Telegraph Act 1868 (31 & 32 Vict. c. 110), to take effect in July 1869.

Telegraph Act 1869
- Act of Parliament
- Parliament of the United Kingdom
- Long title: An Act to alter and amend The Telegraph Act, 1868.
- Citation: 32 & 33 Vict. c. 73
- Territorial extent: United Kingdom

Dates
- Royal assent: 9 August 1869
- Commencement: 9 August 1869
- Repealed: 25 July 1969
Other legislation
Amends	Telegraph Act 1868
Amended by	Post Office Act 1908; Statute Law Revision Act 1953; Statute Law Revision Act 1960
Repealed by	Post Office Act 1969

Status: Repealed

Text of statute as originally enacted

Under the act, government expenditure was not allowed immediately. They had concerns the entrepreneurs who had been bought out would set up in business again undercutting the Post Office flat rate of one shilling (5p) in lucrative city areas (the District charged sixpence (2.5p) in London) with no obligation to serve unremunerative outlying areas. Consequently, nationalisation was delayed until The Telegraph Act 1869 (32 & 33 Vict. c. 73) was passed. This amended the Telegraph Act 1868 to create a Post Office monopoly, with the actual transfer taking effect on 1 January 1870. The act excluded companies operating submarine cables with no landlines from nationalisation. Any company the Post Office had not taken over so far could demand this happen under the act on the same 20-year net profit basis as before. Several small companies that the Post Office considered virtually defunct and not worth buying took advantage of this. The Telegraph Act 1870 (33 & 34 Vict. c. 88) extended the monopoly to the Channel Islands and the Isle of Man, resulting in the purchase of the Jersey and Guernsey Telegraph Company and the Isle of Man Electric Telegraph Company. The Orkney and Shetland Islands Telegraph Company was purchased in 1876–77 and the Scilly Islands Telegraph Company in 1879–80. The STC was finally nationalised in 1890, bringing their international submarine cables and cable ships under Post Office control.

=== Aftermath ===
There was some criticism of the government handling of the nationalisation. The total price paid to nationalise the telegraph was £5.9 million, compared to Scudamore's original estimate of £2.5 million. By 1876, the total cost of acquisitions and extensions had exceeded £10 million. The price paid for most of the telegraph companies far exceeded their capital value because of the 20-year profit calculation. In comparison, the cost of the telegraph across the whole of continental Europe was only £4 million. It was alleged in Parliament, somewhat speculatively, that a new UK telegraph system could have been built from scratch for £2 million. The discrepancy was largely due to the unbudgeted payments to the railways, but compounded by paying them based on 20 years' net profit. Most of the railway leases had far less than 20 years to run, so the Post Office would not get 20 years profit from the purchase. However, it was difficult to avoid once the principle had been established. Reuters went to arbitration over the issue when the government offered them a lesser deal and won.

Further criticism concerned the purchase of the reversionary rights of the railway wayleaves, which had been another unforeseen expense. Without these purchases, when the lease expired, the railway company would then have the right to use the line for public telegraphy on its own account unless a new lease was taken out. Another issue concerned the railways' free use of the telegraph on their property. This was part of the leasing arrangement with the private companies inherited by the Post Office. Also, in most cases, the railway company was entitled to send free messages to stations not on its own line for the purpose of controlling trains, but it was heavily abused. In 1891, 1.6 million free messages were sent, compared to 97,000 in 1871. The contractual arrangements with the railway companies were so complex arbitration cases concerning them were still being heard ten years after nationalisation.

== Post Office Telegraphs ==
Post Office Telegraphs, the branch of the Post Office running the telegraph network, located their head office in Telegraph Street in the old ETC building. "The ever open door" was their slogan above the entrance. Immediately after nationalisation, they set about extending the telegraph from outlying railway stations to town centres. It was their policy to provide telegraph facilities at every office where money orders could be sent, an increase over the existing number. For example, telegraph offices in London increased from 95 in 1869 to 334 in 1870. The Post Office opened 1,007 telegraph stations at post offices by the 5 February 1870 official nationalisation date, and 900 more by the end of the year. By then, 91% of telegrams were sent from post offices. By 1872, the Post Office had 5,000 telegraph offices, and traffic had increased 50% over pre-nationalisation, to some 12 million messages per year.

The expansion was much more expensive than expected. Scudamore had estimated that each new telegraph office would need 3/4 mile of new line, and not the actual three miles. More offices meant installing more lines, plus the lines handed over to the railways for operating their own internal telegraphs had to be replaced. There were 22,000 miles (35,000 km) of line, 83,000 miles (134,000 km) of wire, and over 6,000 instruments in 1872. By 1875, the Telegraph Street central office was the largest telegraph centre in the world, with 450 instruments on three floors working connections both in the UK and worldwide on the Imperial telegraph network.

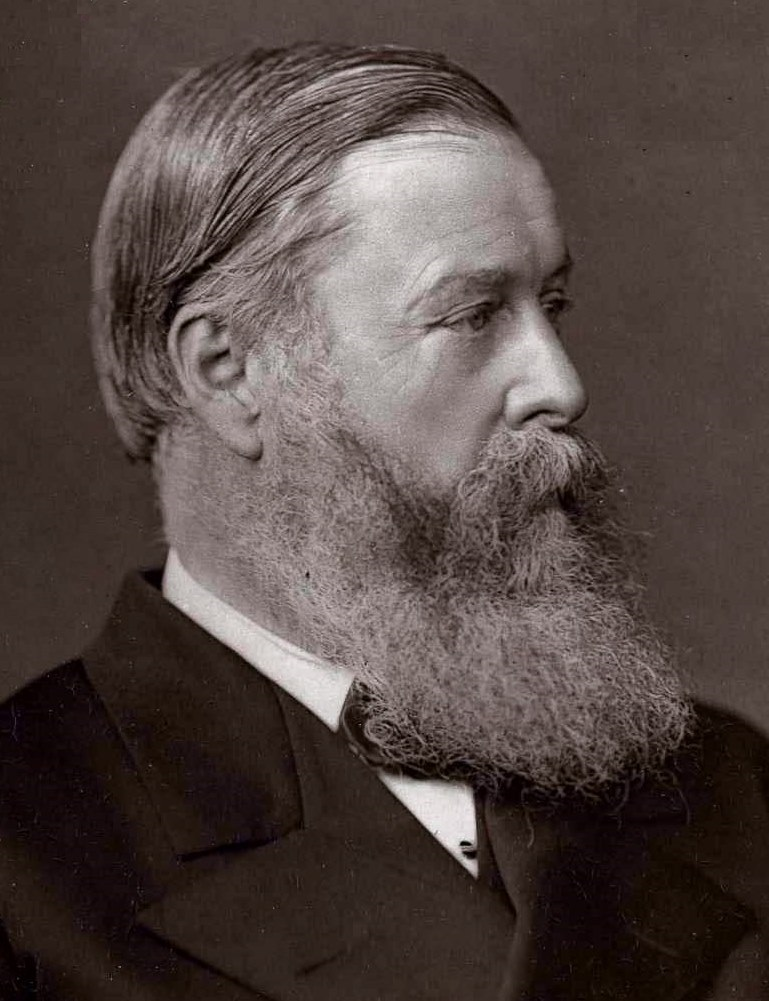
Hugh Childers, 1878

The Post Office decided to standardise on the Morse telegraph system, the international standard since 1865. Companies had used a great variety of different equipment. The largest company, ETC, used the Cooke and Wheatstone needle telegraph. It is possible to send Morse code on a needle telegraph system, but this is slower than using Morse sounders. This standardisation could not be implemented everywhere immediately, not least because the Franco-Prussian War prevented imports of German-made instruments. Some needle telegraphs continued in use, mostly on the railways, well into the 20th century.

In 1873, Scudamore was forced to leave the Post Office, when Parliament's Committee of Public Accounts learned of misappropriation. He had been taking money out of other Post Office budgets to pay for the unforeseen costs of telegraph expansion, anticipating that Parliament would approve more money. Although Scudamore acted in what he thought was the public interest, the rationale for nationalisation—that independent auditors would always detect fraud in a public service—had failed. He was employed to modernise the post and telegraph of the Ottoman Empire.

Post Office telegraph losses grew steadily until 1914. Interest on the capital overspend was not the only problem. Although Scudamore's estimate of the increase in traffic from expansion proved largely accurate, he badly underestimated the operating costs. As a result, net revenue did not cover the interest on loans and year on year the debt was growing, but overall the Post Office remained profitable throughout that time.

The government changed its policy in 1873. It would no longer open a telegraph facility at every office issuing money orders in outlying areas, unless likely to be profitable. There was no proposal to disconnect already connected unprofitable offices. However, the number of these declined with increasing traffic. The situation was not helped when in 1883, Parliament, under pressure from business groups, and against the wishes of the government and the Chancellor of the Exchequer Hugh Childers, called for the minimum charge on inland telegrams be reduced to sixpence (2.5p). In 1885 Postmaster General George Shaw-Lefevre introduced a bill to implement the sixpence rate, which was passed into law as the Telegraph Act 1885 (48 & 49 Vict. c. 58). Shaw-Lefevre tried to mitigate the adverse effects by limiting sixpence telegrams to only 12 words, including the address. Addresses had been free, but would now be charged for on all telegrams. £500,000 was spent on new wires and training additional staff in anticipation of the increased traffic. Traffic did increase from 33 million messages in 1884–85 to 50 million in 1886–87, reaching its peak by 1900 at over 90 million. At the same time, there was an increase in the deficit, mainly due to the cost of the increased staff. Despite the losses, the telegraph remained under national ownership as it was considered a public service.

=== Unionisation ===
In 1871, telegraph clerks in Manchester formed the Telegraphers' Association to agitate for higher wages. This was the first union in the public service. Scudamore demanded the clerks resign from the association and then dismissed those who refused. A strike followed to demand their reinstatement. Scudamore blocked the telegraphic transmission of news of the strike to national newspapers. The resulting protests from the press got him officially censured. Wages were increased in 1872 and a formal staff structure introduced. Their pay was still less than that of cable and maintenance companies, resulting in more than 2,300 out of 6,000 clerks leaving the Post Office between 1872 and 1880.

In 1868, Charles Monk introduced a private member's bill in parliament that extended the vote to Post Office workers and other civil servants. It became law, despite opposition from the Benjamin Disraeli government and lack of support from Gladstone, the leader of the opposition. There was concern that organised workers could have an undue influence on Members of Parliament, but this fear never materialised.

=== Exchange Telegraph Company ===
The Exchange Telegraph Company (later known as Extel) was a news distribution service like Reuters. Founded in 1862, it was a very minor player until 1872 when the Post Office granted it a license to provide London Stock Exchange prices and other financial news to its customers in London. The license limited their operation to within 900 yards of the stock exchange. The Post Office granted similar licenses for local stock exchanges in Liverpool, Manchester, Leeds, Birmingham, Edinburgh, Glasgow, and Dublin. These were all linked to a central office from which news could be distributed. Extel also provided a service for calling the police, or raising a fire alarm.

== Competition from the telephone ==
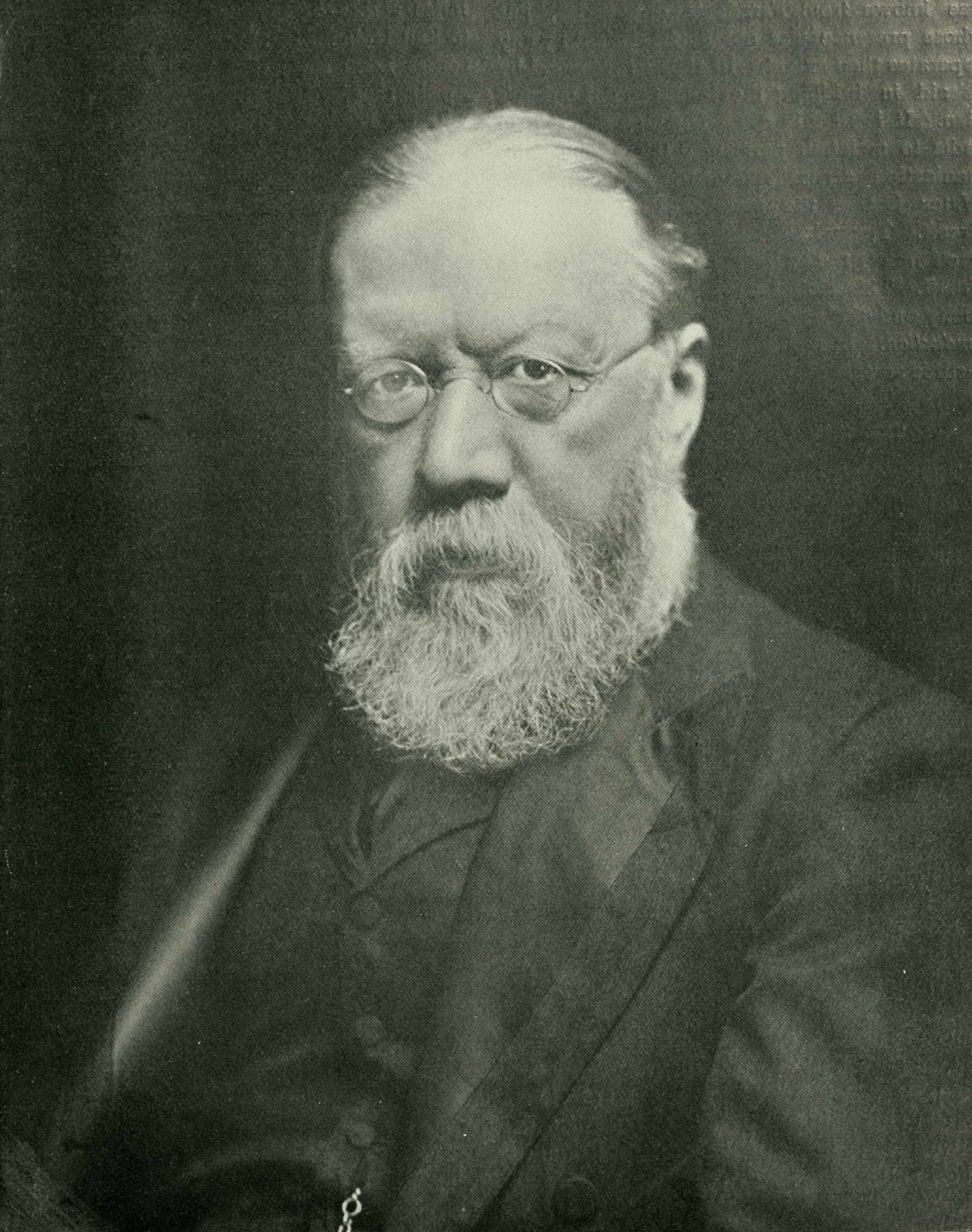
William Preece, 1904

Telegraph usage never developed to the extent Scudamore predicted. Despite the introduction of the sixpence (2.5p) rate, it was still too expensive to compete on price with the letter post, and the telephone after its introduction at the end of the 19th century. Telephones were introduced to Britain when William Preece exhibited a pair he brought from America in 1877. In 1878, the Post Office entered into an agreement with the Bell Telephone Company for the supply of telephones. They initially intended to rent telephone instruments as an alternative to the Wheatstone ABC telegraph on private wires.

The founding of a string of private telephone companies followed. The Telephone Company had the rights to Alexander Graham Bell's patent, and the Edison Telephone Company had Thomas Edison's rival patents. These two firms later merged, forming the United Telephone Company (UTC). Additionally, a number of companies were founded to set up telephone exchanges, starting with the Lancashire Telephone Exchange Company in Manchester in 1879. Telephones on private wires were not a threat, but if exchanges were allowed to connect people over more than a very limited distance, or even worse, connect between exchanges nationally, they could do serious damage to the telegraph business. Parliament had declined to give the Post Office a monopoly over telephones. However, the Post Office argued telephone messages counted as telegraph messages under the Telegraph Act 1869, so private companies so could not set up telephone exchanges without a license from the Post Office.

The Post Office announced they would issue licenses similar to that granted to Extel in 1872, with a limit of half a mile to the distance an exchange could connect. The companies challenged the Post Office monopoly in court, but lost the case in 1880. The same year, a new Postmaster General, Henry Fawcett, began setting up telephone exchanges on the Post Office's own account by modifying the ABC telegraph private wire network, and using telephones made by the Gower Bell Telephone Company. The telephone companies launched an appeal against the court decision. The UTC, which held all the telephone instrument patents, further claimed Gower-Bell, by selling to the Post Office, were in breach of their license that forbade them to set up their own exchanges. However, an agreement was reached before it came to court. The companies were given licenses on more liberal terms and in exchange they dropped their appeal and recognised the Post Office monopoly.

Although the Post Office now accepted the telegraph service was going to decline, they were in a better position financially as the telephone business was very lucrative. Not only was there a fixed charge for the licenses, but the Post Office also took 10% of company gross receipts as a royalty payment. The cost to the Post Office of maintaining the telephone system was insignificant compared to the cost of the telegram system. The Post Office was careful not to allow the companies to grow into a national system. They refused the companies permission to install trunk lines in 1881, preferring to provide them themselves and rent them to the companies. Licenses were limited to one year so that only the Post Office had long term control. In response to complaints that the Post Office was hindering the development of the telephone in the UK, Fawcett allowed the companies to build trunk lines in 1874. Nevertheless, telephone development in the UK still lagged behind other countries.

In 1889, the three main companies, UTC, the National Telephone Company, and the Lancashire & Cheshire Telephone Company amalgamated as the National Telephone Company (NTC). In 1891, the NTC patents ran out and the question of nationalisation was raised, but the Post Office was not ready to do so. The NTC was accused of inefficiency, high prices, and of disfiguring the landscape with haphazard overhead wires, especially in London. When the NTC's license expired in 1911, they were nationalised under the Post Office. After 1911, telegraph usage declined rapidly. At the same time, telephone use grew, especially after 1960. By 1970, there were nearly 14 million telephones in the UK, almost double the 1960 figure.

== Specialist uses ==
=== Railway block signalling ===
From the beginning, Cooke promoted the Cooke and Wheatstone telegraph to the railways as a safer way of working, particularly on single lines, with the first installations in the 1840s. Separation of trains had previously relied on strict timetabling. Block working, controlled by the telegraph, ensured that only one train at a time could be on a section of line. The benefits of block working were not generally appreciated until the late 1860s. The number of block instruments on the London and North Western Railway, for instance, increased from 311 in 1869 to 3,000 in 1879.

=== News service ===
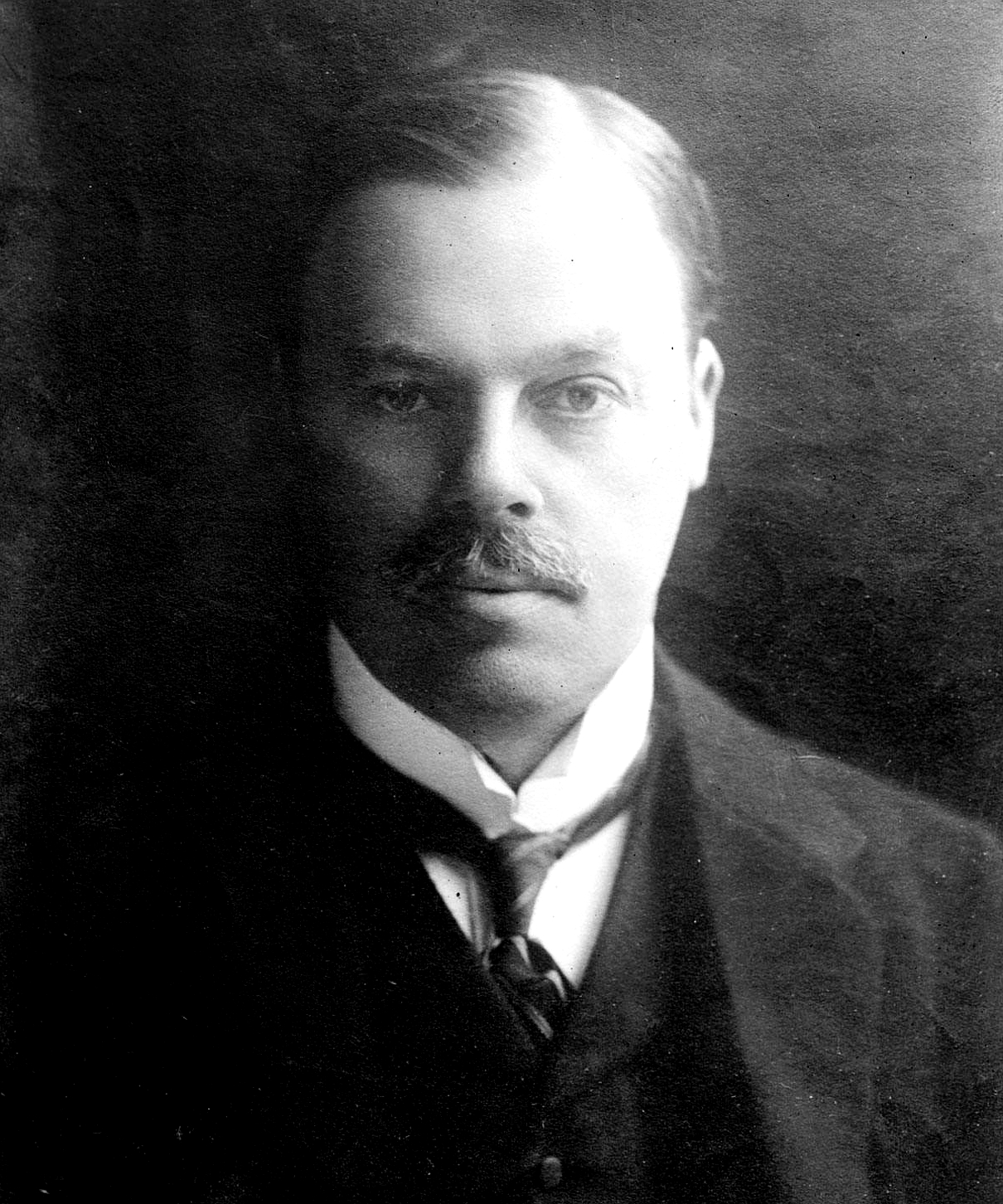
Lord Rothermere, 1914

Prior to World War I, the telegraph rates charged to news services became a political issue. There was a preferential rate granted for news providers. They were charged one shilling (5p) for 75 or 100 words (depending whether it was inside or out of office hours respectively) and then twopence (0.4p) for each additional 75/100 words, including repeat messages to different addresses. A journalist could send 100 messages and 99 of them would cost only twopence. This was unprofitable for the Post Office, but the government was reluctant to act because they did not want to antagonise the newspapers. The issue was put on hold when war broke out, but in 1915, the minimum price of ordinary inland telegrams was raised from sixpence (2.5p) to ninepence (3.8p). Postmaster General Herbert Samuel commented, "If 6d for 12 words is unremunerative, 1s for 100 words is far more so", let alone the twopence copy rate for subsequent messages. Samuel proposed a new press scale of 1s for 60/80 words and a copy rate of threepence (1.3p). This was delayed to 1917 because of the war, and then to 1920, when it was finally implemented.

Some London newspaper proprietors, notably Lord Rothermere, proprietor of the Daily Mirror and cofounder of the Daily Mail, supported increased charges, which could discourage new rivals. In 1926, Rothermere tried to persuade the chancellor of the exchequer, Winston Churchill, but the postmaster general, William Mitchell-Thomson, was against charging an economic rate. Provincial papers would stop using the telegraph, or be driven out of business altogether, with little saving to the Post Office. The fixed costs of maintaining and operating the telegraph system would still have to be paid. The press rate was not increased until 1940 when it went up to one shilling and threepence (6.3p), the result of a general increase in all charges. The copy rate remained at threepence until 1955, when it was abolished. By that time, with increasing use of the telephone, income from press telegrams had become insignificant.

=== Military ===
The first military use of the telegraph in action was during the Crimean War (1853–1856). A submarine cable was laid across the Black Sea from Varna to Balaklava. The army found the use of civilian volunteer telegraphists problematic because of their lack of military training. From 1870, the War Office arranged with the Post Office to train military telegraphists. The army used Royal Engineers from the Telegraph Battalion on state telegraphs, withdrawing them for overseas duties in time of war.

In World War I, the telegraph was recognised as being of crucial importance. Both sides tried to damage the other's international telegraph lines. Post Office cable ships were involved in the action. Just a few hours after the declaration of war on 4 August 1914, CS Alert cut the German cables in the English Channel, almost completely isolating Germany from the rest of the world.

=== Meteorology ===
The rapid weather reports made possible by the telegraph assisted the science of meteorology. In 1860, the Board of Trade contracted the Magnetic to pass weather data between London and Paris. Lighthouses, lightships, and islands got telegraph connections and became weather stations. There were even attempts to place weather ships far out into the Atlantic. The first attempt was in 1870 with the old Corvette The Brick 50 miles (80 km) off Lands End. £15,000 was spent on the project, which ultimately failed. In 1881, a proposal for a weather ship in the mid-Atlantic came to nothing. Deep-ocean weather ships had to await the commencement of radiotelegraphy.

=== Emergency services ===
The provision of telegraph connections to lightships gave them a means of calling for assistance for a ship in difficulties. Prior to having a telegraph connection, there had been cases of ships wrecked on rocks after being seen to be struggling by a lightship for as long as twelve hours. For instance, the SS Agnes Jack sunk with the loss of all hands in January 1883 in view of a lightship off the coast of Wales.

Street call points to raise a fire alarm by electric telegraph had been installed in Berlin as early as 1849. Siemens Brothers had proposed a system in Manchester using the now ubiquitous break glass call points around 1861. The town council rejected the scheme, fearing hooliganism. The first system was not installed in Britain until the Metropolitan Fire Brigade in London took it up in 1880, installing 40 call points. Other towns soon followed resulting in a dramatic reduction in serious fires.

The police were an early user of telegraph private wires. In 1850, Scotland Yard had a line to Charing Cross railway station. In 1860, the Wheatstone ABC system connected the City of London's police stations. Church steeples were used to keep the wires out of reach of vandals and criminals. In 1872–73, the Metropolitan Police connected numerous points in their district to police stations.

=== Commercial codebooks ===
Telegraph codebooks comprise many short codewords which replace a whole phrase or sentence. They were important in the UK, and elsewhere. Used by businesses which sent a large number of telegrams, they reduced a message's word count, holding down its cost. This was particularly important for international traffic sent over long, expensive submarine cables, and much more effective than the common practise of telegram style—heavily abbreviated messaging using the minimum number of words. In some cases, telegraph codes also served the purpose of maintaining the secrecy of commercially sensitive information; companies developed their own private codes.

Many commercial codebooks were published in the UK. Popular titles included The ABC Universal Commercial Electric Telegraphic Code, first published 1873, and Bentley's Complete Phrase Code, first published 1906. William Clausen-Thue, a shipping manager, who later became a Fellow of the Royal Geographical Society, wrote the ABC Code, the first public code to be widely sold. Many codebooks were written for a specific trade or industry. Bentley's, for instance, published a supplement especially for mining.

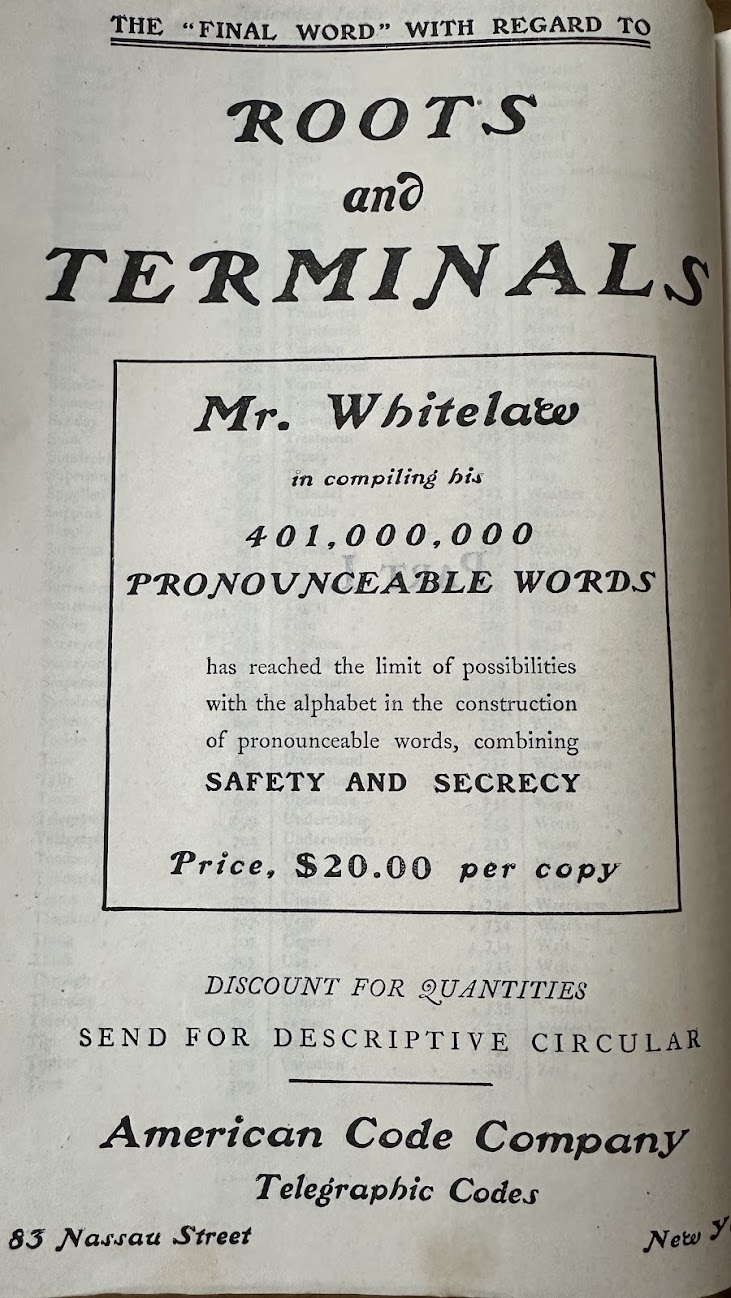
1901 advertisement for Mr Whitelaw's 401,000,000 pronounceable words for use in telegraphic codes.

Bentley's, written by Ernest Lungley Bentley, may have been the most widely used codebook worldwide. It had sold 100,000 copies by 1967. In 1905, Bentley was working for a shipping agency on the company's private code. He left to found his own company and develop a code for general use. He used codewords from Whitelaw's Telegraph Cyphers, published in London in 1904, which contained 20,000 pronounceable five-letter words. Whitelaw's could be used to generate 400 million codewords by running any two five-letter words together to make a still pronounceable ten-letter word. Pronouncability was important because the telegraph authorities only allowed pronounceable codewords. Whitelaw's was purely a list of codewords with no meanings assigned to them. Bentley's was the first codebook of such five-letter codewords.

Starting in 1896, the International Telegraph Union (ITU) attempted to control the use of codes in international telegrams to protect telegraph incomes and avoid messages difficult for operators to transmit. In 1875, they reduced the maximum length of a word (telegrams were charged by the word) from seven syllables to ten letters. In 1879, at a conference in London, they decided all words used must come from one of eight named languages. Codes using invented words could then be charged as a cipher message at a much higher rate. The attempt was unsuccessful. The rules were abused in the UK and Europe and incoming messages from the US (which was not an ITU member) ignored them entirely. In 1890, in an attempt to stop the abuse, the ITU published a list of a quarter of a million authorised codewords. There was strong opposition to this, as many existing codes would not be allowed under this scheme. In 1896, they allowed any code provided it was first submitted for approval and the words added to the official dictionary. By 1901, this had expanded to well over a million words. Maintaining the list had become too difficult, and in 1903, the requirement became that words merely had to be "pronounceable". The publication of Whitelaw's 400 million codewords permanently killed the idea of an official list.

== Automation ==
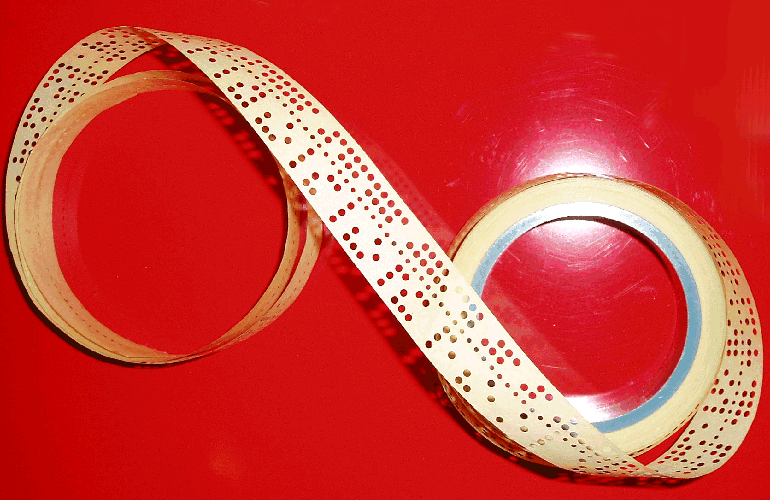
Punched paper tape as used for Baudot-Murray code messages, c. 1976

On busy lines, multiplexing was used to avoid the cost of constructing additional wires. The Post Office used a system that could send four messages simultaneously in each direction (eight simultaneous messages in all). These systems were typically used with high-speed paper punched tape readers to maximise usage of the line. Messages were first typed on to punched tape before sending to the line. The code used was the Baudot code, invented by Émile Baudot. The early keyboards used were Baudot's five-key "piano" keyboards (each key corresponding to one of the bits of the code, and hence to one hole in each column of holes on the tape). Later keyboards were like a typewriter and used Murray's 1901 modification of the Baudot code.

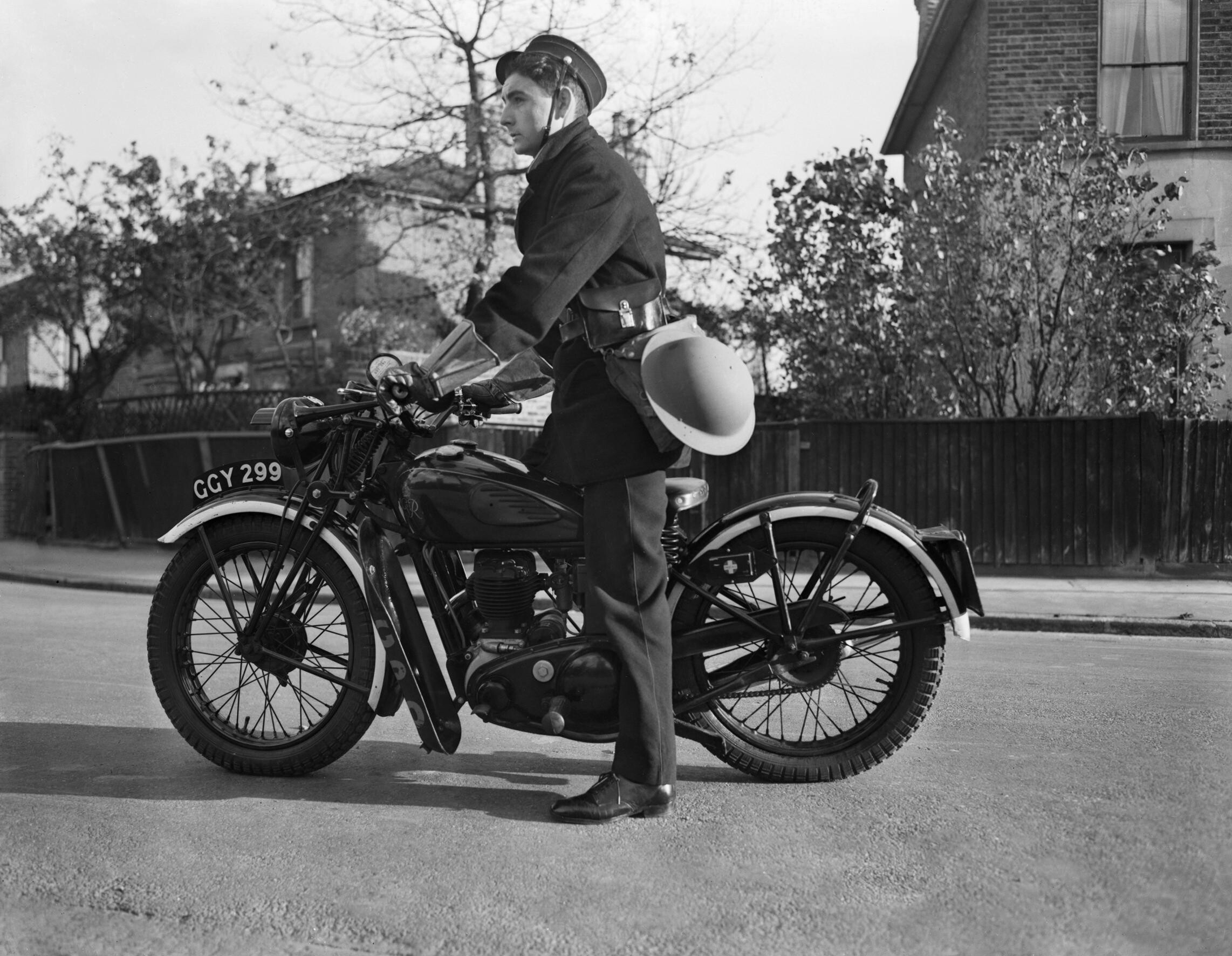
Motorcycle telegraph messenger from Wood Green Post Office, 1941

The teleprinter was invented in the United States in 1915, but the Post Office did not adopt it until 1922, after a British firm, Creed & Company, began producing a similar machine in 1921. From then on, the adoption of teleprinters replaced the Morse system. Morse was eliminated from Post Office landlines and submarine lines in 1932, but continued in use in radiotelegraphy. A teleprinter has a typewriter-like keyboard for sending messages, which are printed automatically at both the sending and receiving ends. The system had great cost savings for the Post Office. The operators did not need to be trained in Morse, and a receiving operator did not need to be attending the machine during receipt of the message. It was only necessary to fix the printed message to the telegram form for delivery, allowing one operator to work several telegraph lines simultaneously.

Because traffic was declining in the 1920s, it was not worthwhile to automate many less-busy lines. Wherever possible, the Post Office closed direct lines and diverted traffic on to the main automated lines by a more circuitous route. About eighty such circuits were closed. Between 1929 and 1935, on the recommendation of a committee set up by Postmaster General William Mitchell-Thomson in 1927, Creed teleprinters replaced the old Morse and Baudot equipment without waiting for it to reach end of life. The War Office expressed concern at this change. They would no longer have a pool of trained Morse operators to call upon. Another innovation in this time was the use of motorcycle messengers to speed up delivery.

Automation, closing uneconomic lines, and staff rationalisation reduced, but did not eliminate, the deficit on the telegraph service. Between 1930 and 1934, the deficit fell from over £1 million to £650,000. Towards the end of the 1930s, teleprinter automatic switching in exchanges was introduced, eliminating the need for manual exchange operators. The possibility of direct dialing between customers' teleprinters was investigated in 1939, but nothing was done until after World War II.

== Decline and recovery ==
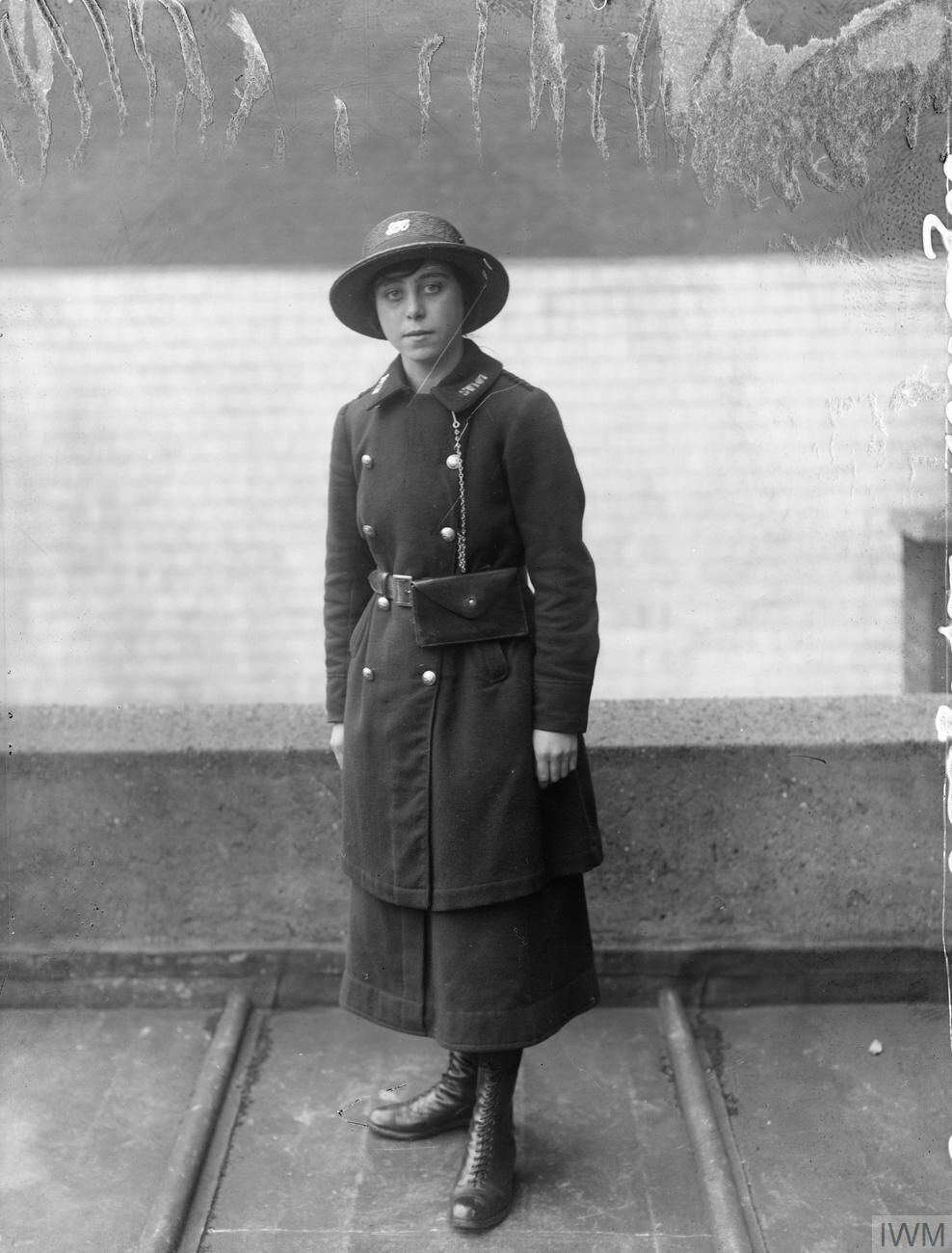
Female telegram messenger during World War I

The pre-war decline was halted briefly during World War I, but usage started falling again in 1920 when the minimum charge for inland telegrams doubled to one shilling (5p). By 1935, with the country in the grip of an economic depression, inland telegram messages had fallen to 35 million, less than half the pre-war figure, and just over one third of the 1900 peak. At the same time, telephone usage increased rapidly as the number of subscribers grew. The number of telephone calls grew from 716 million in 1919 to over 2.2 billion in 1939. Even the number of telephone trunk calls alone, 112 million in 1939, exceeded the number of telegrams. In some cases, telegrams were sent or received by telephone (phonograms), making it increasingly difficult to treat the two services separately. By 1939, 40% of telegrams were phonograms.

Another issue that encouraged the decline was the introduction in 1921 of telegram delivery by "walks" similar to mail delivery. A group of telegrams was delivered by one messenger on the same outing over a predefined route. Previously, as soon as the telegram was received, a messenger was sent out to deliver it. Walks eroded the speed advantage of the telegraph over the post, although the time between them was still usually very short. The postal service was cheaper and could guarantee next-day delivery almost anywhere in the British Isles, which for most purposes was good enough. Around 800 fewer messengers were required as a result of the introduction of this system.

In 1935, Postmaster General Kingsley Wood took steps to increase use of the telegraph service. The sixpence (2.5p) rate was restored, but for only nine words. A priority service was introduced for an additional sixpence, delivered in a red envelope. Special envelopes were also introduced for greetings telegrams, coloured gold with a red and blue border, and a dove logo. This service was heavily publicised to overcome a widespread belief that telegrams usually meant bad news. The message was handwritten rather than using the printed tape, and the Post Office provided a free diary service for recurring events like birthdays and anniversaries. In 1939, over four million greetings telegrams were delivered and the total number of telegrams rose back to 50 million. Another service introduced around this time was facsimile by telegraphy (fax), which newspapers used heavily to receive photographs.

== World War II ==
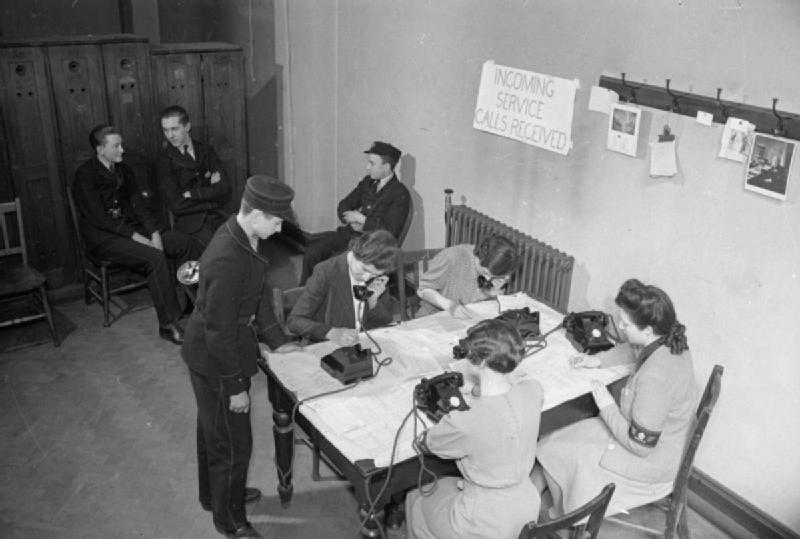
Telegraph messengers collecting telephone messages for bombed-out telephone subscribers at an emergency telephone bureau, 1942

World War II saw an increase in telegraph traffic. Usage peaked in 1945 with 63 million messages. Children evacuated overseas were given one free telegram per month to stay in touch with their parents. Telegraph operators trained in Morse were considered important enough to make it a reserved occupation.

Enemy action caused disruption to the British telegraph system both domestically and in the imperial network worldwide, but communication was largely maintained. A German bombing raid in December 1940 destroyed the Central Telegraph Office in Telegraph Street. Service was maintained by emergency centres in London set up to cover just such an eventuality. The financial centre in the City of London was important enough that messengers were stationed in the street in 1941 to collect telegrams. Italy entered the war on the Axis side in June 1940, before the fall of France to the Germans. The Italian navy then cut the five British telegraph cables from Gibraltar to Malta and two of the five going on from Malta to Alexandria. This was the most direct route of communication with the British forces in Egypt and East Africa. The resistance of the British forces in Egypt to first the Italians, then Erwin Rommel's Afrika Korps played an important part in winning the war, and it was vital to maintain a telegraph connection. Malta was important too because of the threat it posed to the German line of communication supplying their forces in North Africa. The telegraph system was resilient enough to do this, but only by a very roundabout route going round the African continent on submarine cables.

== End of the telegraph era ==
=== Telegrams ===
After the war, telegram usage went back into decline and the deficit returned into the millions of pounds. Telegram numbers were 42 million in 1950, under 14 million in 1960, and only 7.7 million in 1970, the lowest it had ever been under nationalisation. Repeated price rises by successive postmasters general, Ness Edwards and Ernest Marples, in an attempt to keep the deficit under control only made the situation worse by driving traffic down even further. Other measures were the ending or reduction of special prices for certain categories. These included the end of free messages for the railways in 1967, an increase of the press rate, and an increase of the surcharge for telegrams to the Republic of Ireland, which had not been part of the United Kingdom since 1922, and officially a republic since 1949.

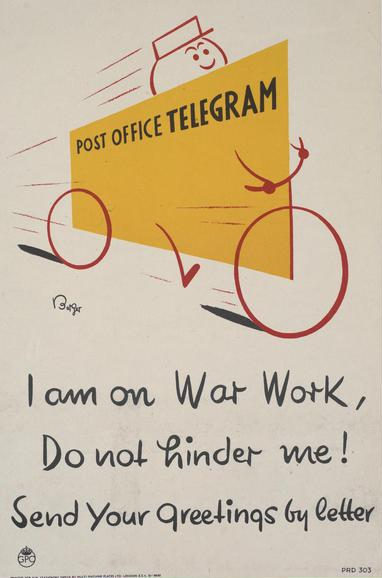
Wartime poster instructing users not to send greetings telegrams

One area that continued to grow was greetings telegrams. More special occasion categories were added and premium "de luxe" telegrams were introduced for some categories in 1961. Business use of public telegrams, once the major user of the service, was now minimal. A greeting telegram unique to the UK was the practise of the monarch sending a message to citizens reaching their hundredth birthday. Instituted by George V in 1917, in the 1940s a special telegram bearing a Royal Crest was introduced. There were only 24 recipients in 1917, rising to 255 in 1952 and by 2015, over 8,000 messages were sent, but no longer by telegram as the service had been discontinued.

In 1969, Post Office Telecommunications, of which the telegraph service formed a part, was made a distinct department of the Post Office, and in 1981, it was separated entirely from the Post Office as British Telecom as a first step to its privatisation in 1984. British Telecom ended their inland telegram service in 1982. International telegrams were still handled, of which there were 13.7 million in 1970. However, incoming international telegrams were no longer delivered by messenger, but by ordinary post.

The telegram service was replaced with the telemessage service in which the message is dictated over the phone to an operator and delivered by post in a yellow envelope similar to the old telegram envelope. British Telecom discontinued this service in 2003 and sold the business to Telegrams Online.

=== Telex and private wires ===
At the end of World War II, the Post Office restarted their move to automatic switching, which had been put on hold for the duration. Automatic switching was established in 1947 and sowed the seed of the international telex network that developed from 1970 onwards. Telex, standing for "telegraphy exchange", was a switched network of teleprinters using automatic exchanges. It was originally a trademark of Western Union, which set up a telex system in the United States in 1962, but soon became a generic name for the worldwide network. The advantages of telex over telephone were that an operator was not required to staff the station to receive messages, and a printed message provided a permanent record. While the telegram service was declining post-war, in the same era, business use of telegraph private wires and telex was growing. Most press traffic was also now on telex or private wires so the increase in the press rate on the public telegram system was of little concern to them. The British military also used telex to link military installations through the Cold War era. Their Telegraph Automatic Switching System was used from 1955 until well into the 1980s.

As office computers became commonplace in the 1980s, telex switched to a new telegraph code, ASCII, which aided integration with computers. ASCII is a 7-bit code, compared to the Baudot 5-bit code, which means it has enough codes to represent both upper and lower case whereas Baudot machines printed in upper case only. Teleprinters could then be used in conjunction with word processor programs for instance. Increased use of fax machines on telephone lines drove down telex traffic, a change that was precipitated by the postal strikes of 1971, and most especially those of 1988. Email and the internet mostly superseded Telex in the 1990s. The number of subscribers in the UK fell from 115,000 in 1988 to 18,000 in 1997. One of the last groups using the telex service was solicitors, who used it for exchange of contracts in conveyancing amongst other things. Conveyancing can be done by post or telephone, but telex has an immediacy that the former does not and provides a written record that the latter does not. Conveyancing can also be done over the internet, but in the 1990s, there was some concern over its security.

== Bibliography ==
- Ash, Stewart (2014). "The development of submarine cables". In Burnett, Douglas R.; Beckman, Robert; Davenport, Tara M. (eds.). Submarine Cables: The Handbook of Law and Policy. Martinus Nijhoff Publishers. ISBN 978-90-04-26032-0.
- Ball, Michael; Sunderland, David T. (2001). An Economic History of London, 1800–1914. Routledge. ISBN 978-0-415-24691-0.
- Beauchamp, Ken (2001). History of Telegraphy. Institution of Engineering and Technology. ISBN 978-0-85296-792-8.
- Bennett, Robert J. (2011). Local Business Voice: The History of Chambers of Commerce in Britain, Ireland, and Revolutionary America, 1760-2011. Oxford University Press. ISBN 0-19-958473-7.
- Bentley, Ernest L. (1909) [1906]. Bentley's Complete Phrase Code. London: E. L. Bentley. OCLC 556787913.
- Bentley, Ernest L. (1907). Mining Supplement to Bentley's Complete Phrase Code. London: E. L. Bentley. OCLC 38695869.
- Black, Robert Monro (1983). The History of Electric Wires and Cables. Peter Peregrinus. ISBN 978-0-86341-001-7.
- Bowers, Brian (2001). Sir Charles Wheatstone: 1802–1875. IEE. ISBN 978-0-85296-103-2.
- Bowler, Peter J.; Morus, Iwan Rhys (2010). Making Modern Science: A Historical Survey. University of Chicago Press. ISBN 978-0-226-06862-6.
- Bright, Charles (1898). Submarine Telegraphs. London: Crosby Lockwood. OCLC 776529627.
- Bright, Edward Brailsford; Bright, Charles (2012) [1898]. The Life Story of the Late Sir Charles Tilston Bright, Civil Engineer. Cambridge University Press. ISBN 978-1-108-05288-7.
- Bruton, Elizabeth (2017). "The Cable Wars': military and state surveillance of the British telegraph cable network during World War One". In Marklund, Andreas; Mogens, Rüdiger (eds.). Historicizing Infrastructure. Aalborg University Press. ISBN 87-7112-594-9.
- Burns, Russel W. (2004a). Communications: An International History of the Formative Years. IEE. ISBN 978-0-86341-327-8.
- Burns, Russel W. (2004b). Matthew, H. C. G.; Harrison, Brian (eds.). "Bain, Alexander (1810–1877), clockmaker and inventor". Oxford Dictionary of National Biography. Oxford University Press. doi:10.1093/ref:odnb/1080.
- Clauson-Thue, William (1873). The ABC Universal Commercial Electric Telegraphic Code.
- Commission of the European Communities: Directorate-General for Employment, Industrial Relations and Social Affairs, "Office automation and social change in Europe", Social Europe, supplement 5/91, Office for Official Publications of the European Communities, 1992 ISBN 92-826-3757-3.
- Cookson, Gillian, "The golden age of electricity", ch. 6 in, Inkster, Ian; Griffin, Colin; Hill, Jeff; Rowbotham, Judith (eds), The Golden Age: Essays in British Social and Economic History, 1850–1870, Taylor & Francis, 2017 ISBN 978-1-351-88874-5.
- Coopersmith, Jonathan (2015). Faxed: The Rise and Fall of the Fax Machine. Johns Hopkins University Press. ISBN 978-1-4214-1591-8.
- Corera, Gordon (2015). Intercept: The Secret History of Computers and Spies. Hachette UK. ISBN 978-0-297-87174-3.
- Darella, Sara L. (2019). "Transatlantic cable". In Welch, Rosanne; Lamphier, Peg A. (eds.). Technical Innovation in American History: An Encyclopedia of Science and Technology. Vol. 1. ABC-Clio. pp. 302–303. ISBN 978-1-61069-094-2.
- Davies, Edward J. II, The United States in World History, Routledge, 2006 ISBN 1-134-47716-3.
- Day, Lance; McNeil, Ian, Biographical Dictionary of the History of Technology, Taylor & Francis, 1998 ISBN 978-0-415-19399-3.
- Derry, Thomas Kingston; Williams, Trevor Illtyd (1960). A Short History of Technology from the Earliest Times to A.D. 1900. Courier Corporation. ISBN 978-0-486-27472-0.
- Duffy, Michael C., Electric Railways: 1880–1990, IEE, 2003, ISBN 978-0-85296-805-5.
- Godfrey, Helen, Submarine Telegraphy and the Hunt for Gutta Percha, BRILL, 2018 ISBN 90-04-35728-9.
- Haigh, Kenneth Richardson, Cableships and Submarine Cables, Adlard Coles, 1968 OCLC 497380538.
- Hamer, Mick, "Quicker by phone?", New Scientist, no. 1689, 4 November 1989.
- Headrick, Daniel R. (1991). The Invisible Weapon: Telecommunications and International Politics, 1851-1945. Oxford University Press. ISBN 0-19-972819-4.
- Hearn, Chester G., Circuits in the Sea: The Men, the Ships, and the Atlantic Cable, Greenwood Publishing Group, 2004 ISBN 978-0-275-98231-7.
- Hewitt, D. E. (1978). Engineering Science II. Macmillan. ISBN 978-1-349-03180-1.
- Hills, Jill, The Struggle for Control of Global Communication, University of Illinois Press, 2002 ISBN 978-0-7099-3701-2.
- Hubbard, Geoffrey, Cooke and Wheatstone and the Invention of the Electric Telegraph, Routledge\, 2013 ISBN 978-1-135-02850-3.
- Huurdeman, Anton A. (2003). The Worldwide History of Telecommunications. Wiley. ISBN 978-0-471-20505-0.
- Hunt, Bruce J. (1997). "Doing science in a global empire: cable telegraphy and electrical physics in Victorian Britain". In Lightman, Bernard (ed.). Victorian Science in Context. University of Chicago Press. ISBN 978-0-226-48112-8.
- Hunt, Bruce J. (2010). Pursuing Power and Light: Technology and Physics from James Watt to Albert Einstein. Johns Hopkins University Press. ISBN 978-0-8018-9358-2.
- Ittmann, Karl, Work, Gender and Family in Victorian England, Springer, 2016 ISBN 134913337X.
- Kahn, David, The Codebreakers: The Story of Secret Writing, New York: Macmillan, 1967 OCLC 855457547.
- Kieve, Jeffrey L. (1973). The Electric Telegraph: A Social and Economic History (PDF). David and Charles. OCLC 655205099.
- Kragh, Helge, "Telephony, long distance", pp. 809–811 in, Hempstead, Colin; Worthington William (eds), Encyclopedia of 20th-Century Technology, Routledge, 2005 ISBN 978-1-135-45551-4.
- Lord, Cliff; Sterling, Christopher H., "Teleprinter/teletype", pp. 447–449 in, Christopher H. Sterling (ed), Military Communications: From Ancient Times to the 21st Century, ABC-CLIO, 2008 ISBN 1-85109-732-5.
- Lundheim, Lars, "On Shannon and Shannon's formula", Telektronikk, vol. 98, no. 1, pp. 20–29, 2002.
- McDonald, Donald; Hunt, Leslie B. (1982). A History of Platinum and its Allied Metals. Johnson Matthey. ISBN 978-0-905118-83-3.
- McNamara, John R., The Economics of Innovation in the Telecommunications Industry, Greenwood Publishing Group, 1991 ISBN 978-0-89930-558-5.
- Mercer, David, The Telephone: The Life Story of a Technology, Greenwood Publishing Group, 2006 ISBN 978-0-313-33207-4.
- Moran, Terence P., Introduction to the History of Communication, Peter Lang, 2010 ISBN 978-1-4331-0412-1.
- Morrison, Heather S., Inventors of Communications Technology, Cavendish Square Publishing, 2015 ISBN 1-5026-0656-9.
- Morse, Samuel, "Examination of the Telegraphic Apparatus and the Processes in Telegraphy", in, Blake, William Phipps (ed), Reports of the United States Commissioners to the Paris Universal Exposition, 1867, vol. 4, US Government Printing Office, 1870 OCLC 752259860.
- Nahin, Paul J., Oliver Heaviside: The Life, Work, and Times of an Electrical Genius of the Victorian Age, Johns Hopkins University Press, 2002 ISBN 978-0-8018-6909-9.
- Nickles, David Paull, How the Telegraph Changed Diplomacy, Harvard University Press, 2003 ISBN 0-674-01035-3.
- Orji, Uchenna Jerome (2019). International Telecommunications Law and Policy. Cambridge Scholars Publishing. ISBN 978-1-5275-2641-9.
- Parsons, Patrick R., Blue Skies: A History of Cable Television, Temple University Press, 2008 ISBN 1-59213-706-7
- Pitt, Douglas C., The Telecommunications Function of the British Post Office, Saxon House, 1980 ISBN 978-0-566-00273-1.
- Prescott, George Bartlett, History, Theory, and Practice of the Electric Telegraph, Boston: Ticknor and Fields, 1866 LCCN 17-10907
- Roberts, Steven, Distant Writing, distantwriting.co.uk,
  - ch. 4, "The Electric Telegraph Company", archived 1 July 2016,
  - ch. 5, "Competitors and allies", archived 1 July 2016.
- Russell, Robert W., History of the Invention of the Electric Telegraph, New York: William C. Bryant & Co., 1853 OCLC 904216191.
- Schiffer, Michael B., Power Struggles: Scientific Authority and the Creation of Practical Electricity Before Edison, MIT Press, 2008 ISBN 978-0-262-19582-9.
- Seward, Ingrid, The Queen's Speech: An Intimate Portrait of the Queen in Her Own Words, Simon and Schuster, 2015 ISBN 1-4711-5097-6.
- Shaffner, Taliaferro Preston (1859). The Telegraph Manual. Pudney & Russell.
- Smith, Willoughby (1891). The Rise and Extension of Submarine Telegraphy. London: J.S. Virtue & Co. OCLC 1079820592.
- Stephenson, Charles, The Fortifications of Malta 1530–1945, Bloomsbury Publishing, 2012 ISBN 978-1-84908-015-6.
- Thomas, William Arthur (2012) [1973]. The Provincial Stock Exchanges. Routledge. ISBN 978-0-7146-2981-0.
- Thompson, Silvanus Phillips, The Life of Lord Kelvin, vol. 1, American Mathematical Society, 2004 ISBN 978-0-8218-3743-6 (first published 1910).
- Walker, Peter M., "Contract", The Solicitors' Journal, vol. 142, 1998.
- Welch, Dick; Frémond, Olivier, eds. (1998). The Case-by-case Approach to Privatization. World Bank Publications. ISBN 978-0-8213-4196-4.
- Wenzlhuemer, Roland, Connecting the Nineteenth-Century World: The Telegraph and Globalization, Cambridge University Press, 2013 ISBN 1-107-02528-1.
- Williams, Liz, Kind Regards: The Lost Art of Letter Writing, Michael O'Mara Books, 2012 ISBN 1-84317-713-7.
- Winseck, Dwayne R.; Pike, Robert M., Communication and Empire, Duke University Press, 2007 ISBN 978-0-8223-8999-6.
- Whitelaw, Whitelaw's Telegraph Cyphers, London: Whitelaw's Telegraph Cypher Co., 1904 OCLC 820084531.
