= Telegraph Act =

Stock short title used for UK legislation

Telegraph Act is a stock short title which used to be used for legislation in the United Kingdom, relating to telegraphy.

The Bill for an Act with this short title may have been known as a Telegraph Bill during its passage through Parliament.

Telegraph Acts may be a generic name either for legislation bearing that short title or for all legislation which relates to telegraphy. It is a term of art.

See also Wireless Telegraphy Act.

== List ==
The Telegraph Act 1863 (26 & 27 Vict. c. 112)
The Telegraph Act Amendment Act 1866 (29 & 30 Vict. c. 3)
The Telegraph Act 1868 (31 & 32 Vict. c. 110)
The Telegraph Act 1869 (32 & 33 Vict. c. 73)
The Telegraph Act 1870 (33 & 34 Vict. c. 88)
The Telegraph Act 1878 (41 & 42 Vict. c. 76)
The Submarine Telegraph Act 1885 (48 & 49 Vict. c. 49)
The Telegraph Act 1885 (48 & 49 Vict. c. 58)
The Submarine Telegraph Act 1886 (50 Vict. c. 3)
The Telegraph (Isle of Man) Act 1889 (52 & 53 Vict. c. 34)
The Telegraph Act 1892 (55 & 56 Vict. c. 59)
The Telegraph Act 1899 (62 & 63 Vict. c. 38)
The Telegraph (Money) Act 1907 (7 Edw. 7. c. 6)
The Telegraph (Construction) Act 1908 (8 Edw. 7. c. 33)
The Telegraph (Arbitration) Act 1909 (9 Edw. 7. c. 20)
The Telegraph (Construction) Act 1911 (1 & 2 Geo. 5. c. 39)
The Telegraph (Construction) Act 1916 (6 & 7 Geo. 5. c. 40)

The Telegraph Acts

The Telegraph Acts 1868–1869 means the Telegraph Act 1868 and the Telegraph Act 1869.

The Telegraph Acts 1863 to 1892 means the Telegraph Act 1863, the Telegraph Act Amendment Act 1866, the Telegraph Act 1868, the Telegraph Act 1869, the Telegraph Act 1870, the Telegraph Act 1878, the Telegraph Act 1885, the Telegraph (Isle of Man) Act 1889 and the Telegraph Act 1892.

== See also ==
List of short titles
