= Attorney General v Edison Telephone Co of London Ltd =

English case law

- Court: Queen's Bench
- Citation: LR 6 QBD 244

Court membership
- Judges sitting: Stephen J and Pollock B

Attorney General v Edison Telephone Co of London Ltd (1880–81) LR 6 QBD 244 is an English law case on the application of the old Telegraph Act 1869. It held that the monopoly of the Post Office under the statute extended to telephone companies.

== Facts ==
The Attorney General claimed the company, formed in 1879 to produce telephones according to two new patents, would be breaching the Postmaster General’s monopoly on the telegraph.

== Judgment ==
Stephen J and Pollock B gave judgment. They held the Act covered ‘communications by any wire and apparatus connected therewith used for telegraphic communication, or by any other apparatus for transmitting messages or other communications by means of electric signals’ (249) This meant that the telephone companies were subject to the licensing and monopoly provisions of the Act. It effectively allowed the Post Office to take over the businesses, which had acted without an authority.

== See also ==
- UK enterprise law
- Telegraph Act 1868
