= Frank Ives Scudamore =

Frank Ives Scudamore (1823–1884) was an English Post Office reformer and writer. He oversaw the country's first significant nationalization and in 1874 he was managing a turnover of a million pounds per annum passing through 3,600 different offices.

== Life ==
The son of John Scudamore, a solicitor, by his wife Charlotte, daughter of Colonel Francis Downman, R.A. and niece of Sir Thomas Downman, he was born at Eltham in February 1823, and educated at Christ's Hospital; Sir Charles Scudamore was his uncle. On leaving school he entered the General Post Office (1841), and, on the amalgamation of the receiver-general's and the accountant-general's offices in 1852, was appointed chief examiner of the new department.

In 1856 Scudamore became receiver and accountant general. He was, after George Chetwynd of the money-order office, heavily involved in the scheme for government savings banks. Scudamore explained to William Ewart Gladstone as Chancellor of the Exchequer the proposed machinery, and had support and obtained authorization from parliament in 1861.

In 1865 Scudamore drew up a report on the advisability of the state acquiring the telegraphs, which were then in the hands of a few private companies, on lines suggested by Frederick Ebenezer Baines. In negotiations Scudamore was employed as chief agent, and the way was prepared for the Telegraph Act 1868 entitling the state to acquire all the telegraphic undertakings in the kingdom, and the Telegraph Act 1869 giving the Post Office the monopoly of telegraphic communication. In 1870 the Irish telegraphs were transferred to the Post Office. Sir John Tilley, Scudamore's superior, did not support the nationalization, but allowed Scudamore to run the resulting state telegraph system.

Scudamore had been promoted assistant secretary (1863) and soon afterwards second secretary, of the Post Office, and in 1871 he was made C.B. By 1874 he had overseen the country's first significant nationalization, he was managing a turnover of a million pounds per annum passing through 3,600 different offices. Clashes over his impatience of obstacles led to his resignation in 1875. Among other changes made by Scudamore was the introduction of female clerks into the postal service. He then accepted an offer of the Ottoman government to go to Constantinople to organize the Turkish international post office; the sultan conferred on him the order of the Medjidieh in 1877; he gave up his post on encountering delays. He continued to live at Therapia, and wrote.

Scudamore died at Therapia on 8 February 1884, aged 61, and was buried in the English cemetery at Scutari.

== Works ==
Scudamore wrote:

- People whom we have never met (1861), a lecture on fairies.
- The Day Dreams of a Sleepless Man, London, 1875.
- France in the East; a contribution towards the consideration of the Eastern Question (London, 1882), which is a plea for the good intentions of France in south-eastern Europe, and against the policy of preserving the integrity of the Ottoman Empire.

Scudamore also contributed to Punch, and in The Standard, The Scotsman, the Comic Times, and other papers. He wrote for The World under Edmund Yates.

== Mentioned by Anthony Trollope ==
The distinguished British author Anthony Trollope (1815–1882), was employed in the Post Office from 1859 until 1867, when he resigned to devote all his energy to his writing. In his autobiography, he mentioned Scudamore:

When Sir Rowland Hill left the Post Office, and my brother-in-law, Mr.[John] Tilley, became Secretary in his place, I applied for the vacant office of Under-Secretary. Had I obtained this I should have given up my hunting, have given up much of my literary work,—at any rate would have edited no magazine,—and would have returned to the habit of my youth in going daily to the General Post Office. There was very much against such a change in life. The increase of salary would not have amounted to above £400 a year, and I should have lost much more than that in literary remuneration. I should have felt bitterly the slavery of attendance at an office, from which I had then been exempt for five-and-twenty years. I should, too, have greatly missed the sport which I loved. But I was attached to the department, had imbued myself with a thorough love of letters,—I mean the letters which are carried by the post,—and was anxious for their welfare as though they were all my own. In short, I wished to continue the connection. I did not wish, moreover, that any younger officer should again pass over my head. I believed that I had been a valuable public servant, and I will own to a feeling existing at that time that I had not altogether been well treated. I was probably wrong in this. I had been allowed to hunt,—and to do as I pleased, and to say what I liked, and had in that way received my reward. I applied for the office, but Mr. Scudamore was appointed to it. He no doubt was possessed of gifts which I did not possess. He understood the manipulation of money and the use of figures, and was a great accountant. I think that I might have been more useful in regard to the labours and wages of the immense body of men employed by the Post Office. However, Mr. Scudamore was appointed; and I made up my mind that I would fall back upon my old intention, and leave the department. I think I allowed two years to pass before I took the step; and the day on which I sent the letter was to me most melancholy.

In one of his novels, Trollope made a humorous mention of Scudamore. In The Way We Live Now, the planned elopement of Marie Melmotte is frustrated when she is intercepted by detectives instructed by a telegram sent by her father:

It may be well doubted whether upon the whole the telegraph has not added more to the annoyances than to the comforts of life, and whether the gentlemen who spent all the public money without authority ought not to have been punished with special severity in that they had injured humanity, rather than pardoned because of the good they had produced. Who is benefited by telegrams? The newspapers are robbed of all their old interest, and the very soul of intrigue is destroyed. Poor Marie, when she heard her fate, would certainly have gladly hanged Mr. Scudamore.

== Family ==
Scudamore married in 1851 Jane, daughter of James Sherwin, surgeon, of Greenwich, and left children. They had at least one son called Leonard George Scudamore who was a casualty during the First World War. He was buried in the Commonwealth war graves cemetery of St Leonard's Church at Sutton Veny.

== Notes ==
Attribution

This article incorporates text from a publication now in the public domain: Lee, Sidney, ed. (1897). "Scudamore, Frank Ives". Dictionary of National Biography. Vol. 51. London: Smith, Elder & Co.
