= Telegraph Act 1962 =

Act of the Parliament of the United Kingdom

Telegraph Act 1962 (Note: Section 2(1).)
- Act of Parliament
- Parliament of the United Kingdom
- Long title: An Act to consolidate certain enactments empowering the Postmaster General to regulate the use of telegraphs and the general conduct of telegraphic business.
- Citation: 10 & 11 Eliz. 2. c. 14
- Territorial extent: England and Wales; Scotland; Northern Ireland; Isle of Man; Channel Islands; (Note: Sections 2(4) and 2(5).)

Dates
- Royal assent: 29 March 1962
- Commencement: 29 April 1962 (Note: Section 2(6).)
- Repealed: 1 October 1969
Other legislation
| Amends | See § Repealed enactments |
| Repeals/revokes | See § Repealed enactments |
| Repealed by | Post Office Act 1969 |

Status: Repealed

Text of statute as originally enacted

The Telegraph Act 1962 (10 & 11 Eliz. 2. c. 14) was an act of the Parliament of the United Kingdom that consolidated enactments empowering the Postmaster General to regulate the use of telegraphs and the general conduct of telegraphic business.

== Provisions ==
=== Repealed enactments ===
Section 2(3) of the act repealed 4 enactments, listed in the schedule to the act.

| Citation | Short title | Extent of repeal |
|---|---|---|
| 48 & 49 Vict. c. 58 | Telegraph Act 1885 | The whole act. |
| 3 & 4 Geo. 6. c. 25 | Post Office and Telegraph Act 1940 | The whole act. |
| 2 & 3 Eliz. 28 | Telegraph Act 1954 | The whole act. |
| 9 & 10 Eliz. 2. c. 15 | Post Office Act 1961 | In section sixteen, in subsection (2), the words from "section two of the Telegraph Act, 1885" to "transmission of telegrams". In section seventeen, the words "or regulations under section two of the Telegraph Act, 1885". In section eighteen, paragraphs (e) and (f). In the Schedule, the entries relating to the Telegraph Act, 1885, the Post Office and Telegraph Act, 1940, and the Telegraph Act, 1954. |

== Subsequent developments ==
The whole act was repealed by section 141(1) of, and part II of schedule 11 to, the Post Office Act 1969, which came into operation on 1 October 1969.
