= Telegraph Act 1885 =

Act of the Parliament of the United Kingdom

Telegraph Act 1885 (Note: Section 1.)
- Act of Parliament
- Parliament of the United Kingdom
- Long title: An Act to amend the Telegraph Acts, 1863 to 1878.
- Citation: 48 & 49 Vict. c. 58
- Territorial extent: England and Wales; Scotland; Ireland; Jersey; Guernsey; Isle of Man; (Note: Section 4.)

Dates
- Royal assent: 14 August 1885
- Commencement: 14 August 1885 (Note: The Acts of Parliament (Commencement) Act 1793.)
- Repealed: 29 April 1962
Other legislation
Amends	Telegraph Act 1868
Amended by	Statute Law Revision Act 1950
Repealed by	Telegraph Act 1962

Status: Repealed

Text of statute as originally enacted

The Telegraph Act 1885 (48 & 49 Vict. c. 58) was an act of the Parliament of the United Kingdom. It became law on 14 August 1885.

It was considered to be read as one with the previous acts of 1863–1878, and cited with them as the Telegraph Acts; it was also considered a Post Office Act with regard to the Post Office (Offences) Act 1837 (7 Will. 4 & 1 Vict. c. 36).

The act repealed section 15 of the Telegraph Act 1868 (31 & 32 Vict. c. 11 0), and substituted for it provisions enabling the Postmaster-General, with the consent of the Commissioners of the Treasury, to make regulations about the hours and general conduct of business at telegraph offices, the conditions of use of telegraphic services, and the fees for those services. However, it laid down maximum charges for the most common uses of the service.

It stipulated that charges throughout the United Kingdom were to be at a fixed rate regardless of distance, not exceeding 6d for the first twelve words or ½d per additional word, inclusive of addresses. This charge was to include delivery on foot within one mile of the telegraph office, or to the town postal boundaries; if the message was to travel further, it would be delivered with the next standard postal delivery from that office, at no additional charge, or optionally by foot messenger at no more than 6d per two miles.

All regulations made under the act were to be laid before Parliament, and have statutory force; any regulations made under the 1868 Act were to remain in force until repealed by the Postmaster-General or superseded by new regulations. The act extended to the Isle of Man and the Channel Islands.

It was one of Post Office Acts 1837 to 1895.

== Subsequent developments ==
Section 3 of the act was repealed by section 1(1) of, and the first schedule to, the Statute Law Revision Act 1950 (14 Geo. 6. c. 6), which came into force on 23 May 1950.

The whole act was repealed by section 2(3) of, and the schedule to, the Telegraph Act 1962 (10 & 11 Eliz. 2. c. 14), which came into force on 29 April 1962.

== See also ==
- Telegraph Act

== Bibliography ==
- Oliver & Boyd's new Edinburgh almanac and national repository for the year 1886. Oliver & Boyd, Edinburgh, 1886
- Terramedia UK media law - accessed 6 March 2009
