= Exchanging contracts =

Under English law, exchanging contracts is the final step in a house purchase. It occurs after a solicitor or conveyancer has carried out all necessary searches, and there is agreement to the contract terms. Once each party has signed the contracts, and they have been exchanged, they are binding.

The contracts will include a completion date, when the property becomes acquired by the purchaser. At exchange of contracts, any deposit needed has to be paid, and arrangements for building insurance must be made so that the property is insured from that day. Usually, the present insurer will cover this new property free of increased premium until the completion date.

This is a system that occurs only under English law, and the exchange of contracts can occur many weeks or months after a sale offer has been agreed in principle. That contrasts with most other countries, where the house sale becomes legally binding very quickly.
