= Telegraph Act 1870 =

Act of the Parliament of the United Kingdom

Telegraph Act 1870 (Note: Section 1.)
- Act of Parliament
- Parliament of the United Kingdom
- Long title: An Act to extend the Telegraph Acts of 1868, 1869 to the Channel Islands and the Isle of Man.
- Citation: 33 & 34 Vict. c. 88
- Territorial extent: United Kingdom; Jersey; Guernsey; Isle of Man

Dates
- Royal assent: 9 August 1870
- Commencement: 9 August 1870 (Note: The Acts of Parliament (Commencement) Act 1793.)
Other legislation
Amends	Telegraph Act 1868
Amended by	Statute Law Revision (No. 2) Act 1893

Status: Amended

Text of statute as originally enacted

Revised text of statute as amended

Text of the Telegraph Act 1870 as in force today (including any amendments) within the United Kingdom, from legislation.gov.uk.

The Telegraph Act 1870 (33 & 34 Vict. c. 88) is an act of the Parliament of the United Kingdom. It extended the Telegraph Act 1868 (31 & 32 Vict. c. 110) to cover the Channel Islands and the Isle of Man, thus allowing the British state to nationalise telegraph companies in these territories.

The act gave orders to the Postmaster General to nationalize the Jersey and Guernsey Telegraph Company and the Isle of Man Electric Telegraph Company (the sale of which to the government had already been agreed in October 1868). The act further makes clear that the Submarine Telegraph Company, which had laid a commercial submarine telegraph cable across the English Channel in 1853, was not to be affected. The act was introduced partly due to the efforts of William Henry Preece, who was chief engineer of the Jersey and Guernsey Telegraph Company and a major shareholder, and had campaigned on behalf of the Channel Islands' inclusion in the Telegraph Act 1868.

The Isle of Man Electric Telegraph Company was nationalised under the act at a cost to the Post Office of £16,106. The shareholders received in total £11,774, which was approximately 160 times the worth of their holdings. The Jersey and Guernsey Telegraph Company was also purchased by the government.

The act was modified in 1923 in order to clarify the fact that the legislation does not apply to the Irish Free State or any of its successors. Its provisions have been made essentially redundant by the Telecommunications Act 1984, which allowed the Channel Islands' telecommunication companies to be privatized, leading to the creation of Jersey Telecom, Manx Telecom and Sure.
