= Telegraph Act 1868 =

Act of the Parliament of the United Kingdom

Telegraph Act 1868 (Note: Section 1.)
- Act of Parliament
- Parliament of the United Kingdom
- Long title: An Act to enable Her Majesty's Postmaster General to acquire, work and maintain Electric Telegraphs.
- Citation: 31 & 32 Vict. c. 110
- Territorial extent: United Kingdom

Dates
- Royal assent: 31 July 1868
- Commencement: 31 July 1868 (Note: The Acts of Parliament (Commencement) Act 1793.)
Other legislation
Amended by	Telegraph Act 1869; Telegraph Act 1870; Statute Law Revision Act 1875; Administration of Justice (Miscellaneous Provisions) Act 1933; Statute Law Revision Act 1953; Statute Law Revision Act 1960; Local Government Act 1966; Local Government (Scotland) Act 1966; British Telecommunications Act 1981; Telecommunications Act 1984; Postal Services Act 2000 (Consequential Modifications No. 1) Order 2001

Status: Partially repealed

Text of statute as originally enacted

Revised text of statute as amended

Text of the Telegraph Act 1868 as in force today (including any amendments) within the United Kingdom, from legislation.gov.uk.

The Telegraph Act 1868 (31 & 32 Vict. c. 110) is an act of the Parliament of the United Kingdom. It provided the basis for the British state to nationalise and take over telegraph companies and/or their operations.

It has been effectively repealed (only section 1, providing the short title remains in force).

It was one of Post Office Acts 1837 to 1895.

== Subsequent developments ==
Section 8(7) of the act was repealed by section 1 of, and the first schedule to, the Statute Law Revision Act 1953 (2 & 3 Eliz. 2. c. 5), which came into force on 18 December 1953.

Sections 4, 5, 7 and 14 of the act were repealed by section 1(1) of, and the schedule to, the Statute Law Revision Act 1960 (8 & 9 Eliz. 2. c. 56), which came into force on 29 July 1960.

Section 22 of the act was repealed for England and Wales by section 43(2) of, and part III of schedule 6 to, the Local Government Act 1966, which came into force on 1 April 1967.

Section 22 of the act was repealed for Scotland by section 48(2) of, and schedule 6 to, the Local Government (Scotland) Act 1966, which came into force on 1 April 1967.

Section 11 of, and paragraphs 7–9, 12 and 13 of the schedule to, the act were repealed by section 89(1) of, and part I of schedule 6 to, the British Telecommunications Act 1981, which came into force on 27 July 1981.

== See also ==
- General Post Office
- Telegraph Act
- UK public service law
- Attorney General v Edison Telephone Co of London Ltd (1880–81) LR 6 QBD 244
