= George Chetwynd (disambiguation) =

Sir George Chetwynd (1916–1982) was a British lecturer and politician.

George Chetwynd may also refer to:

- George Chetwynd (civil servant) (1824–1882), Receiver and Accountant General of the British Post Office
- Sir George Chetwynd, 1st Baronet (1739–1824), of the Chetwynd baronets
- Sir George Chetwynd, 2nd Baronet (1783–1850), of the Chetwynd baronets, MP for Stafford
- Sir George Chetwynd, 3rd Baronet (1808–1869), of the Chetwynd baronets
- Sir George Chetwynd, 4th Baronet (1849–1917), of the Chetwynd baronets
- Sir George Guy Chetwynd, 5th Baronet (1874–1935), of the Chetwynd baronets

== See also ==
- Chetwynd (disambiguation)
