= Chetwynd (surname) =

Chetwynd is a surname, originally a toponymic surname of people from the village of Chetwynd, Shropshire, England. Notable people with the surname include:

- Amanda Chetwynd, British mathematician and statistician
- Catana Chetwynd, American cartoonist
- Edward Chetwynd (1577–1639), English churchman, Dean of Bristol
- George Chetwynd (civil servant) (1824–1882), Receiver and Accountant General of the British Post Office
- Sir George Chetwynd (1916–1982), British lecturer, politician and public servant
- Godfrey Chetwynd, 8th Viscount Chetwynd (1863–1936), British industrialist
- John Chetwynd (1643–1702), English politician
- John Chetwynd, 2nd Viscount Chetwynd (c.1680–1767), English diplomat and politician
- Josh Chetwynd (born 1971), British journalist, broadcaster, author and former baseball player
- Lionel Chetwynd (born 1940), Canadian-American screenwriter and film director and producer
- Marvin Gaye Chetwynd (born Alalia Chetwynd, 1973, a.k.a. Spartacus Chetwynd), British artist
- Paul Chetwynd British paranormal investigator and one half of the paranormal team Ghosts on Trent
- Ralph Chetwynd (1890–1957), British-Canadian businessman and politician
- Walter Chetwynd (Newcastle-under-Lyme MP) (died 1638), English politician
- Walter Chetwynd (1633–1693), English antiquary and politician
- Walter Chetwynd (Lichfield MP) (c.1680–1732), British politician, Governor of Barbados
- Walter Chetwynd, 1st Viscount Chetwynd (1678–1736), English politician
- William Chetwynd (MP for Wootton Bassett) (c.1691–1744), British lawyer and politician
- William Chetwynd, 3rd Viscount Chetwynd (1684–1770), English politician
- William Richard Chetwynd (c.1731–1765), English politician

Fictional characters

- Courtney Chetwynde, character in American author D.J. MacHale's Pendragon series of science fiction/fantasy novels
