= Baynard House, London =

Office block in London

Coordinates: 51°30.7151′N 0°6.0734′W

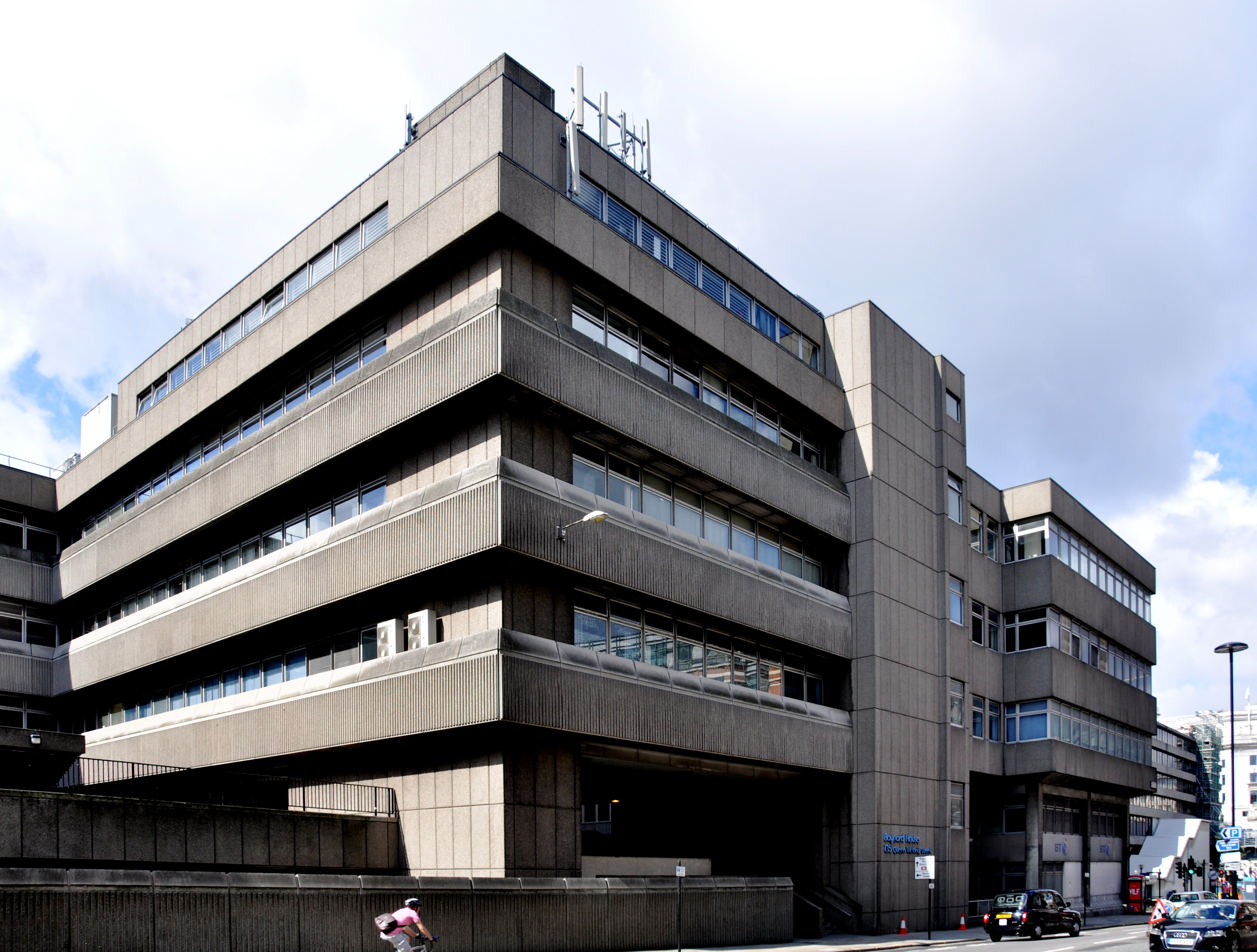
Baynard House, Blackfriars, seen from Queen Victoria Street

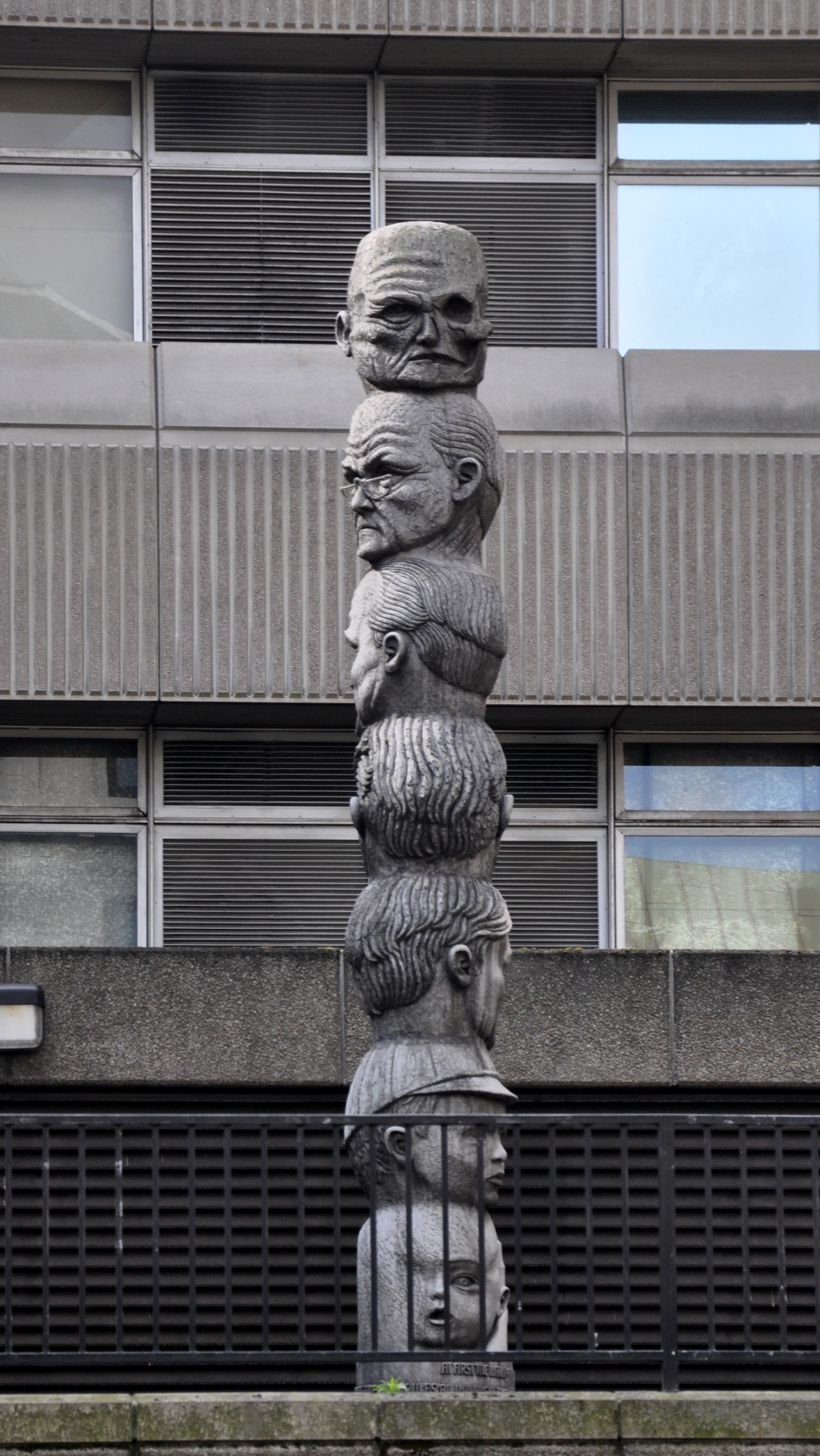
The Seven Ages of Man by Richard Kindersley

Baynard House is a brutalist office block in Queen Victoria Street in Blackfriars in the City of London, occupied by BT Group. It was built on the site of the second (and last) Baynard's Castle. Most of the land under it is a scheduled monument. From 1982 to 1997 it housed the BT Museum.

== Features and uses ==
The building was designed by William Holford incorporating a separation of pedestrians from streets, with a first-floor adjoining walkway along Queen Victoria Street that connects to Blackfriars station. The entrance foyer to Baynard House remains off this first floor level. A plaque in the building foyer reads:

"BAYNARD HOUSE handed over on 5th July 1979 to PETER BENTON Esq., Managing Director Telecommunications, Architects: Holford / PSA; Construction: John Laing"

Legislation protecting the sightline of St Paul's Cathedral from bridges across the Thames and from places such as Putney and Richmond Park restricted the overall height of the building to three full levels above ground.

Baynard House was for a few years a telephone exchange, and housed the first operational System X telephone exchange, which went live in 1980. From 1982 to 1997 it housed the BT Museum.

It is the site of an unusual cast aluminium public sculpture by Richard Kindersley, entitled The Seven Ages of Man. The sculpture, consisting of a column made up of sculptural heads resembling a totem pole, was commissioned by Post Office Telecommunications and unveiled in April 1980.

As of 2012 it had the largest solar panel area in the City of London and the second largest of a corporate building in the UK.

The Faraday Building, one of the first major telephone exchanges in the UK, is across the road.

== In film ==
Actor Tom Cruise broke his ankle whilst performing a stunt, jumping from the roof in 2017, shooting scenes for the film Mission: Impossible – Fallout.

== Gallery ==
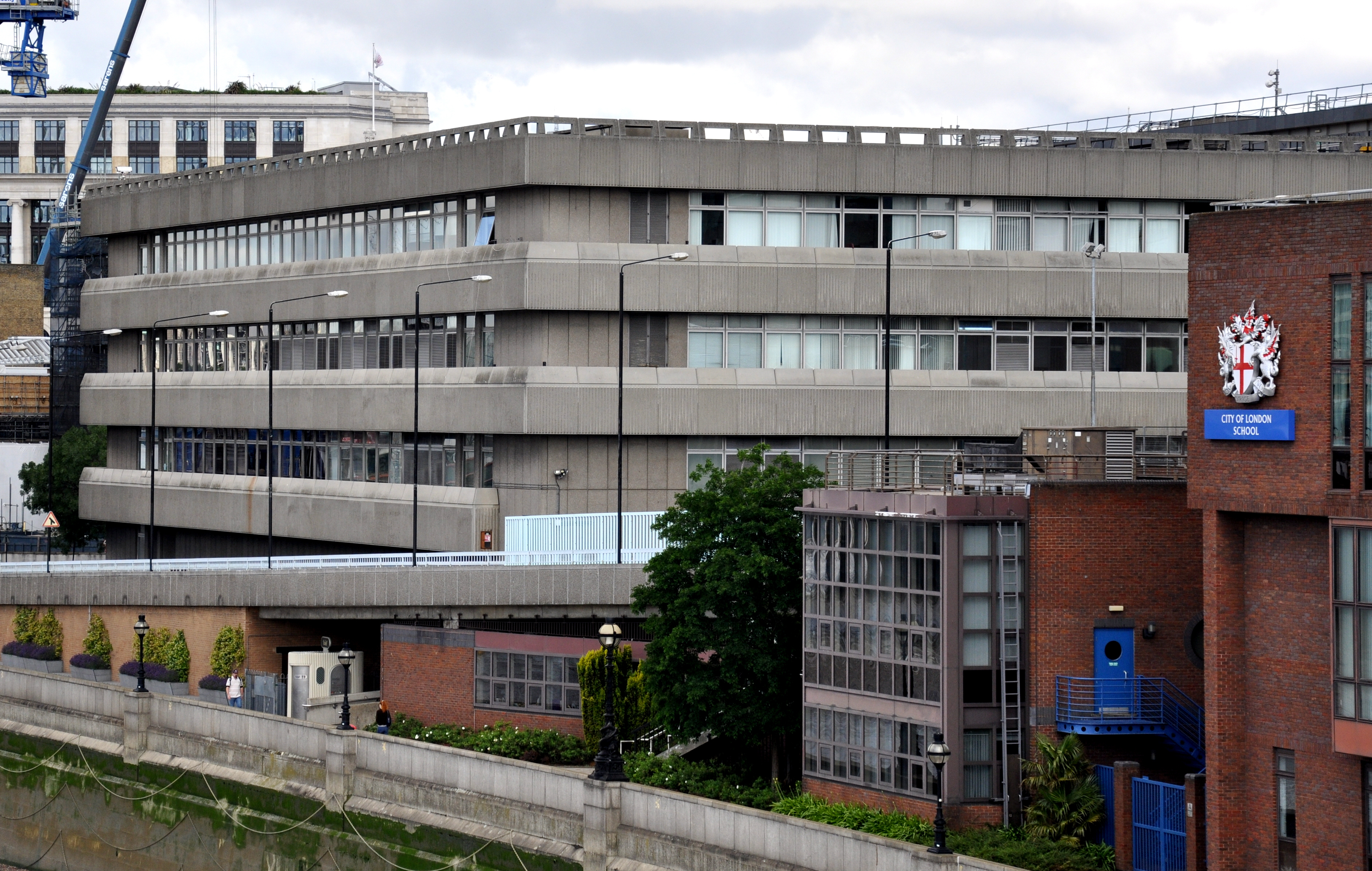
Waterfront side of Baynard House

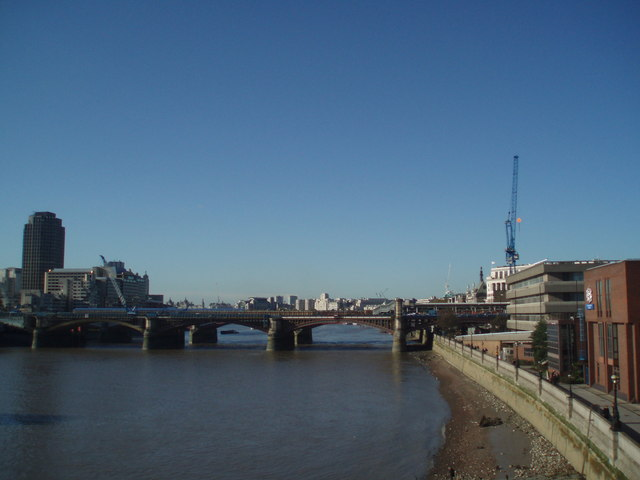
Waterfront side of Baynard House and Blackfriars Railway bridge. Viewed from the Millennium Bridge.

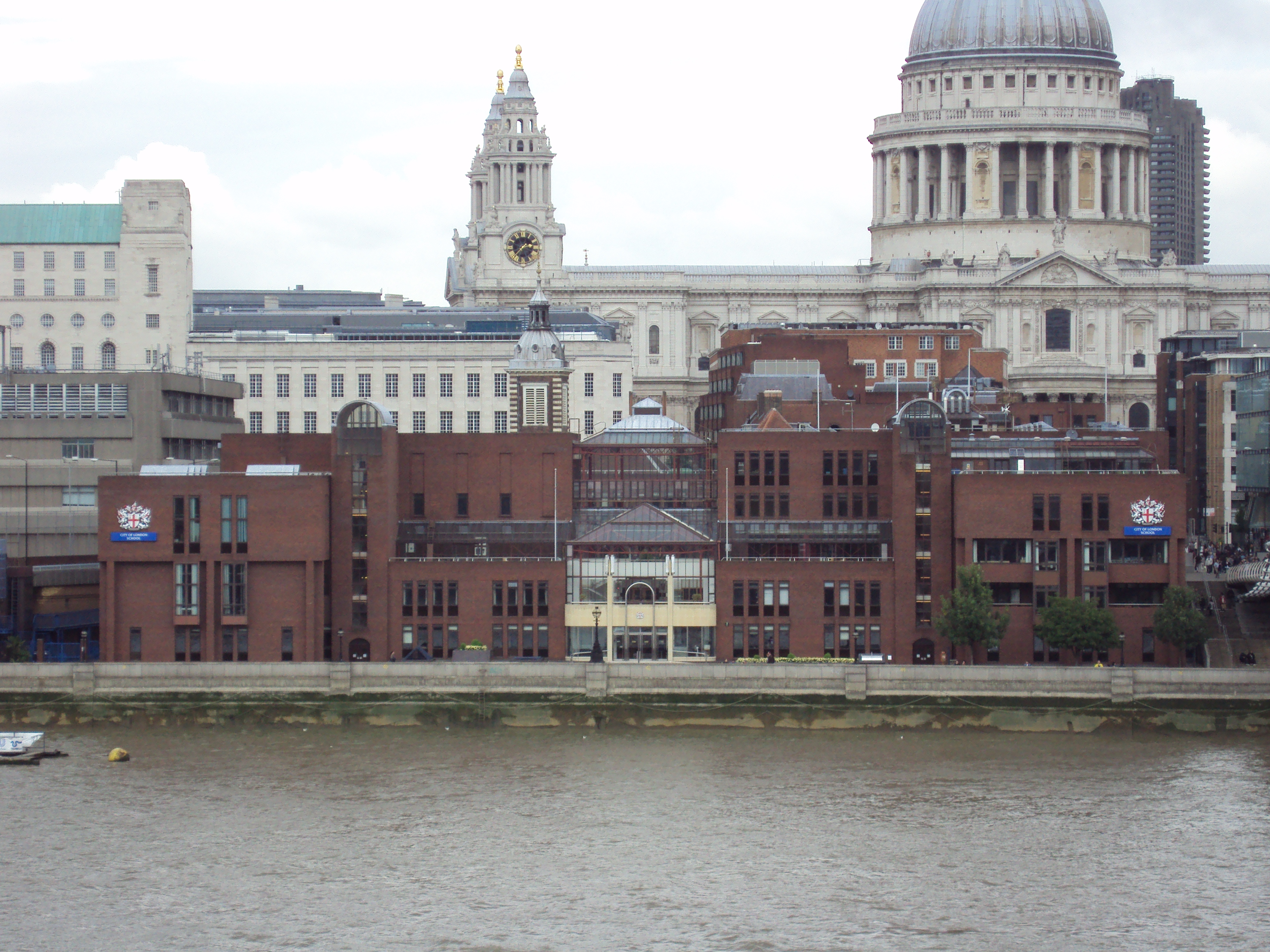
Baynard House and Faraday Building (green roof) on the left, City of London School centre on the north bank of the River Thames, London. Shows height of construction restriction.

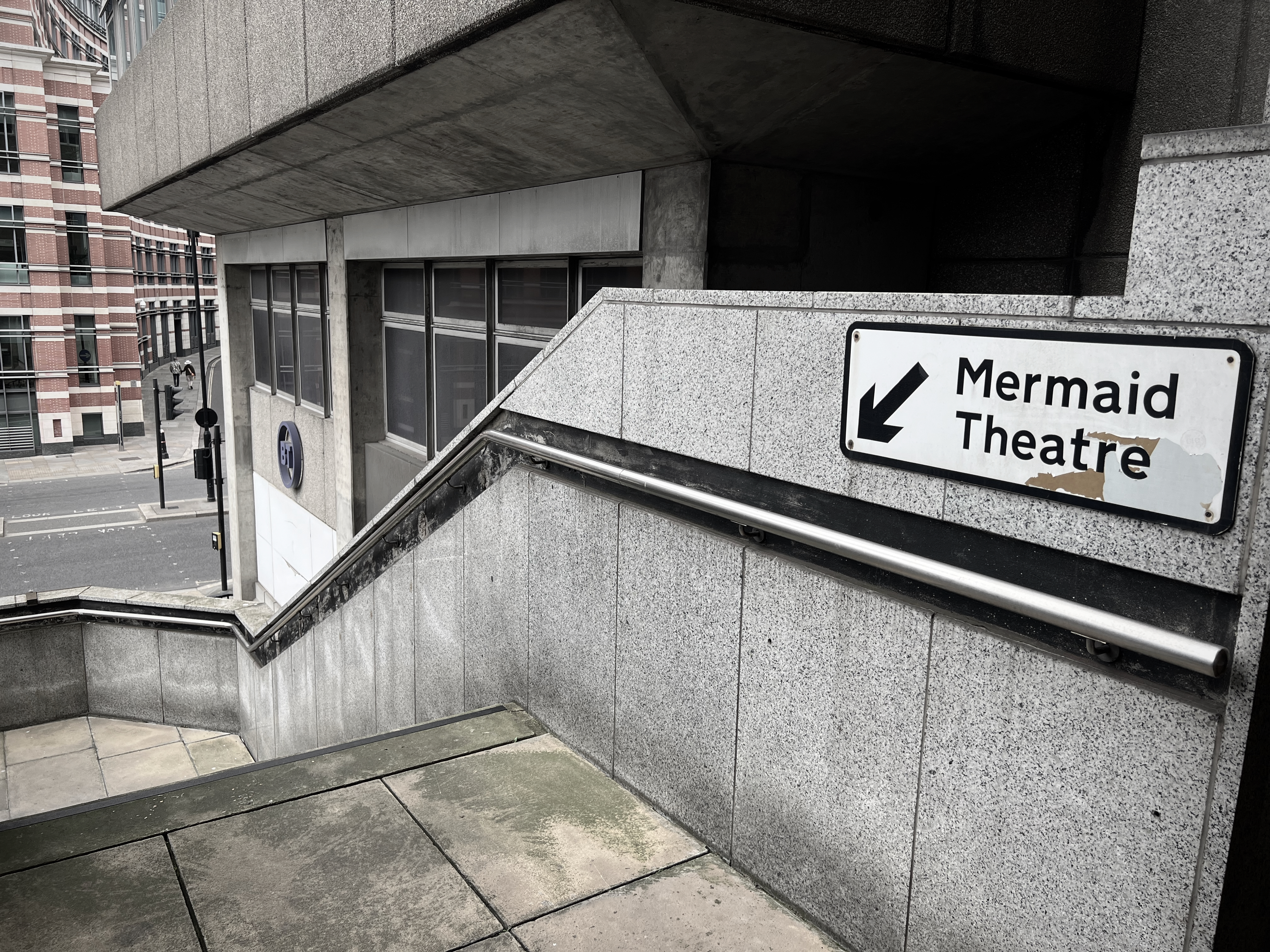
Baynard House taken stairs near Blackfriars Station

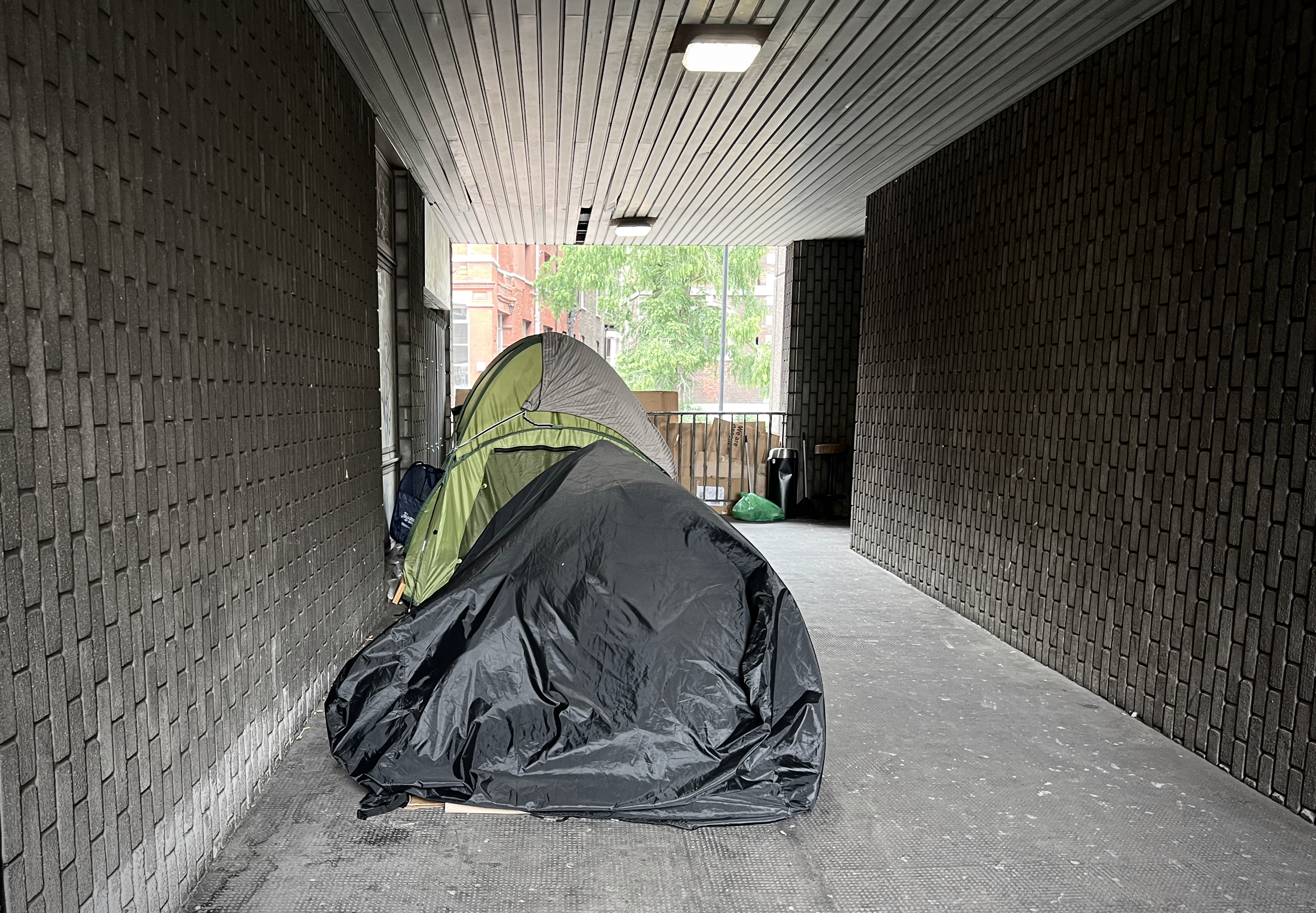
Detail of Baynard House and tents used for shelter

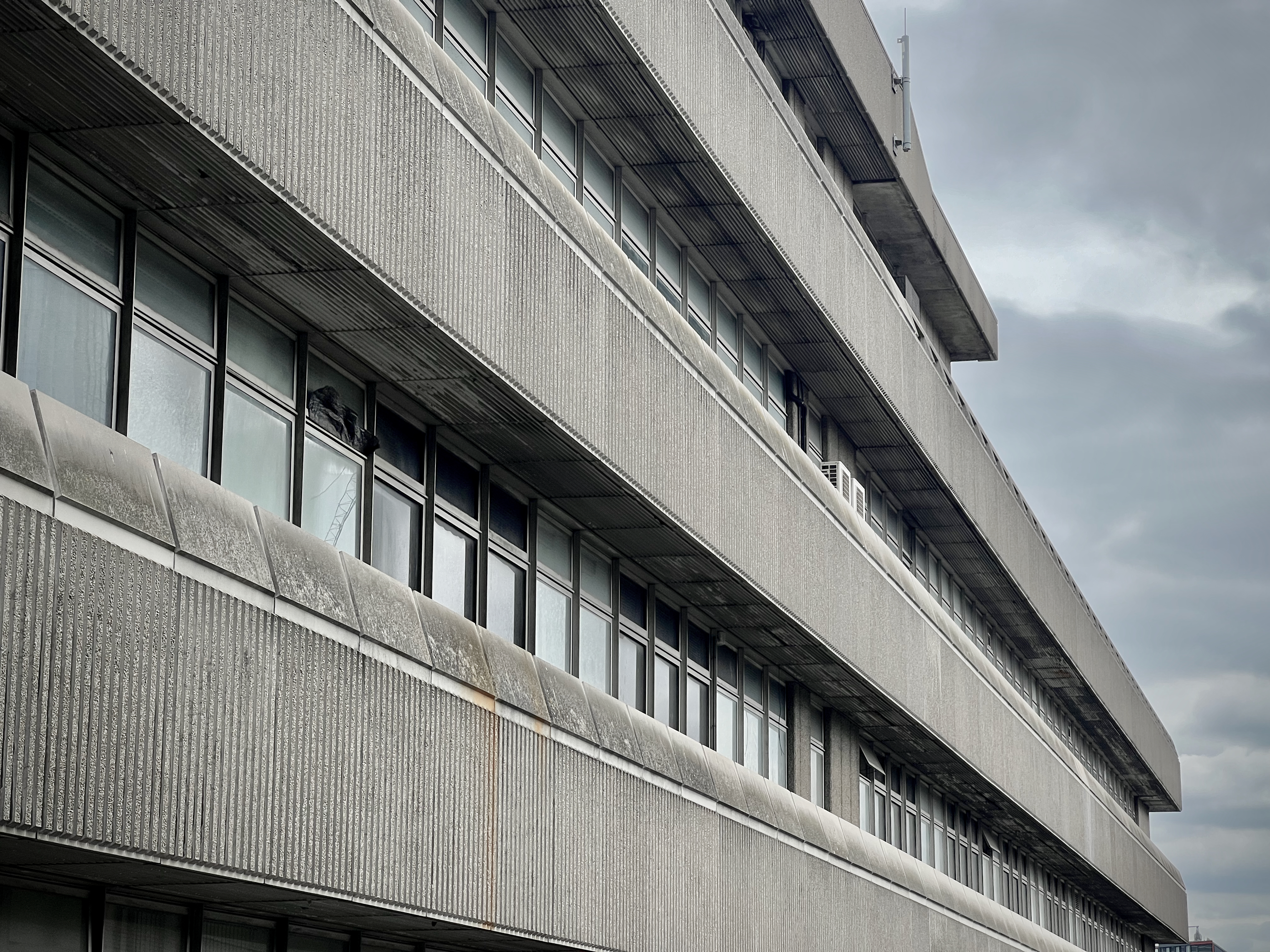
Detail of Baynard House

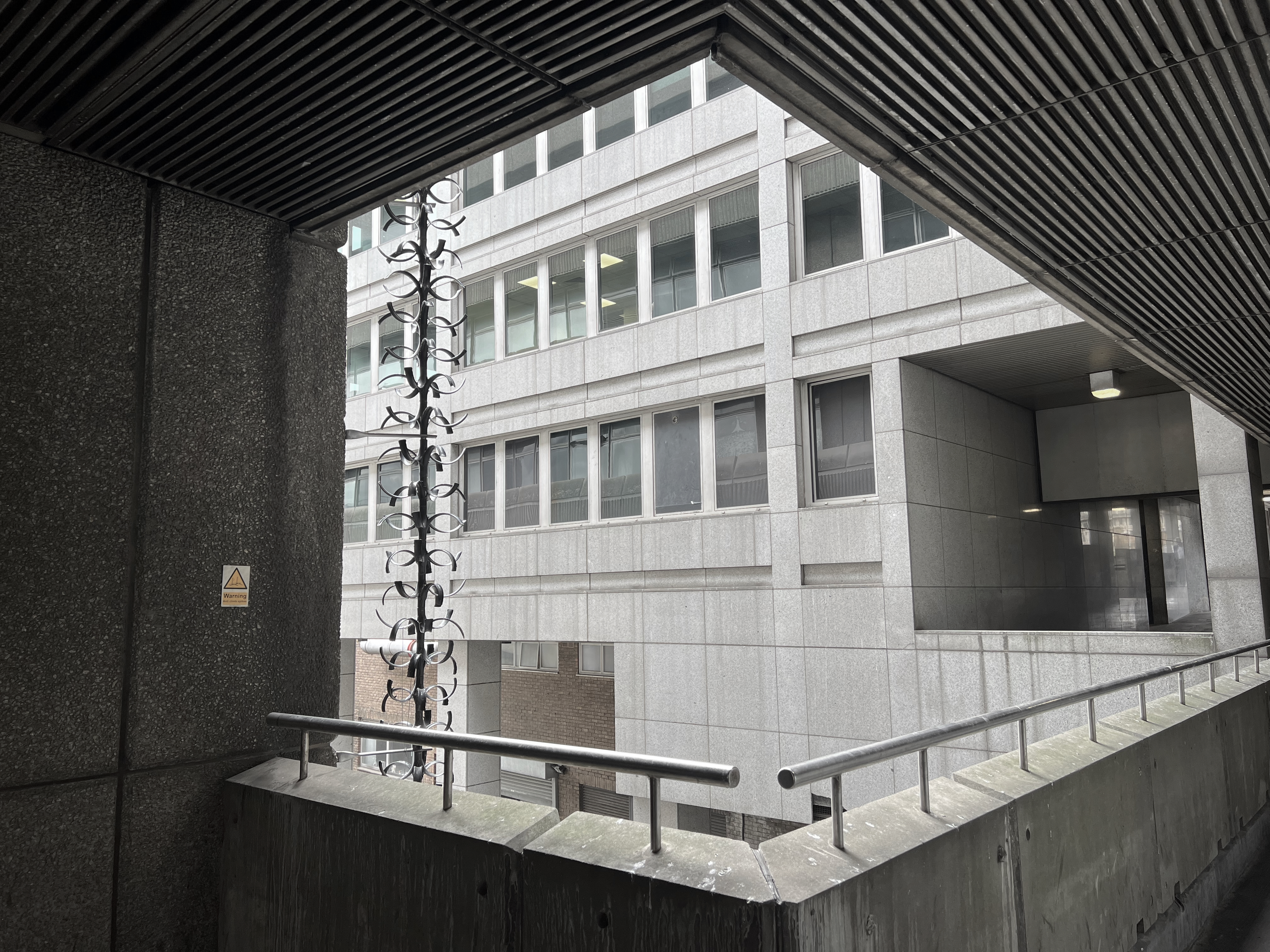
Detail of Baynard House and spikes used to stop climbing

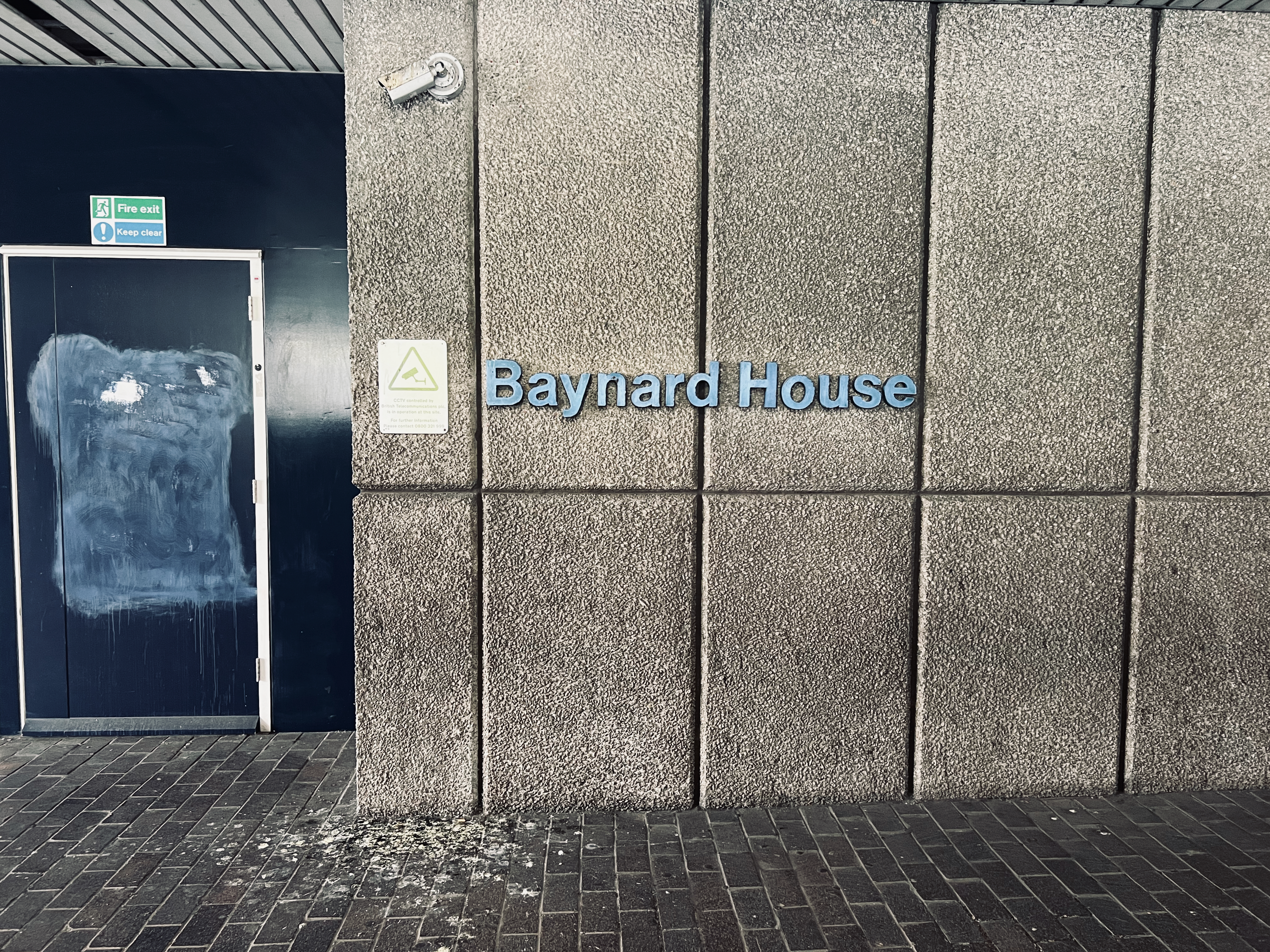
Baynard House sign next to entrance

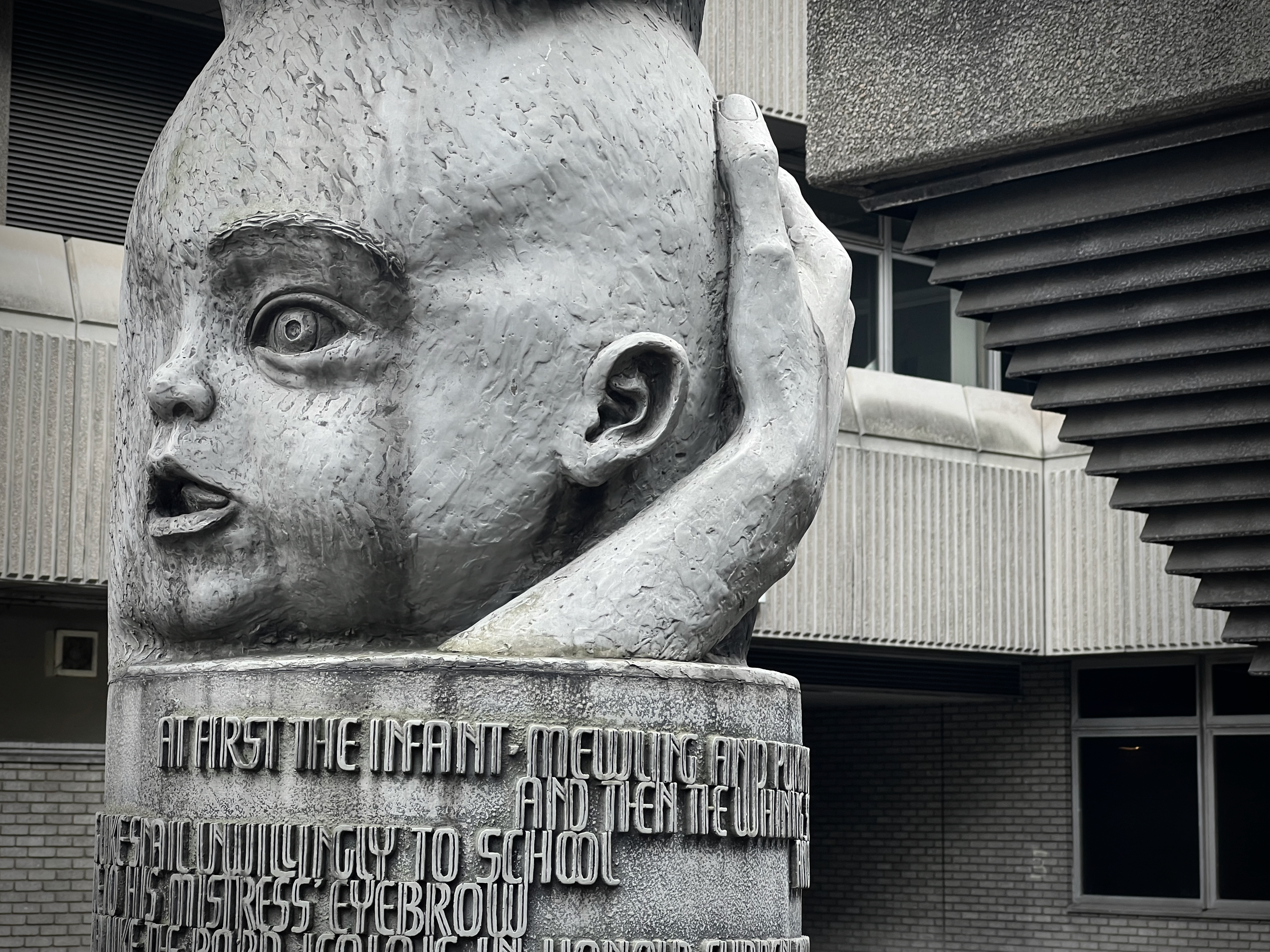
The Seven Ages of Man sculpture by Richard Kindersley at Baynard House

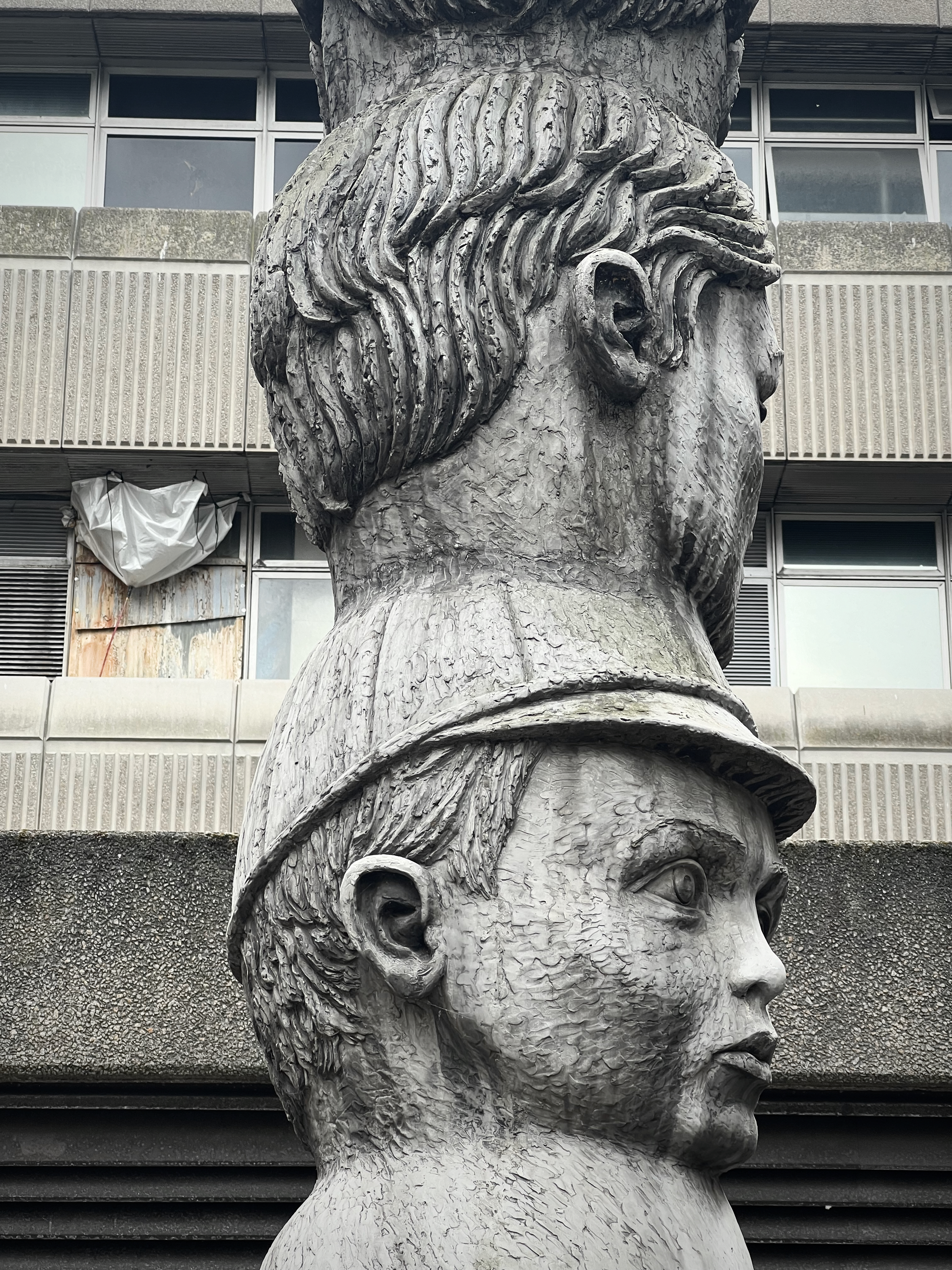
Close up of The Seven Ages of Man sculpture by Richard Kindersley at Baynard House

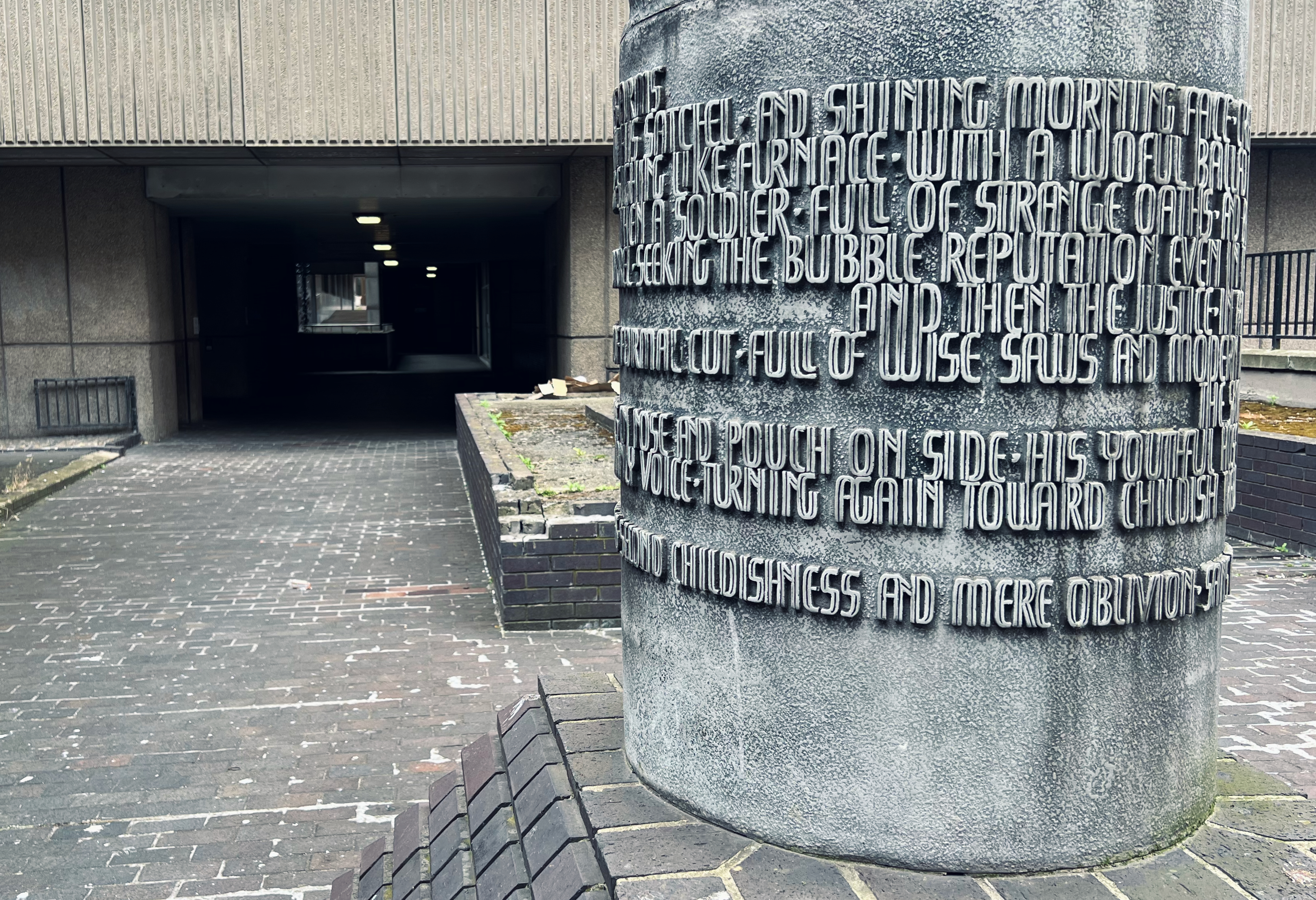
Close up of text on The Seven Ages of Man sculpture by Richard Kindersley at Baynard House

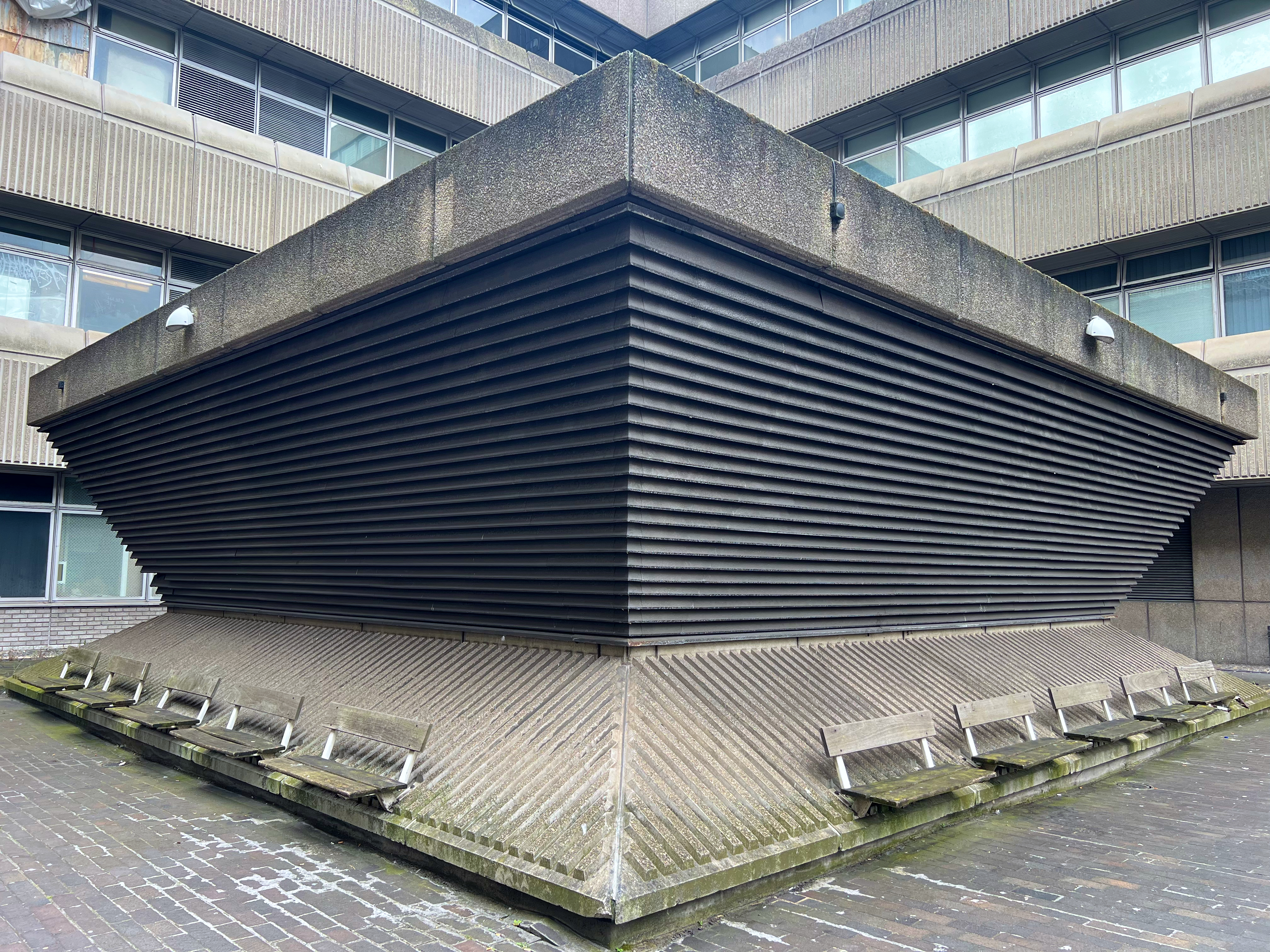
Detail of Baynard House

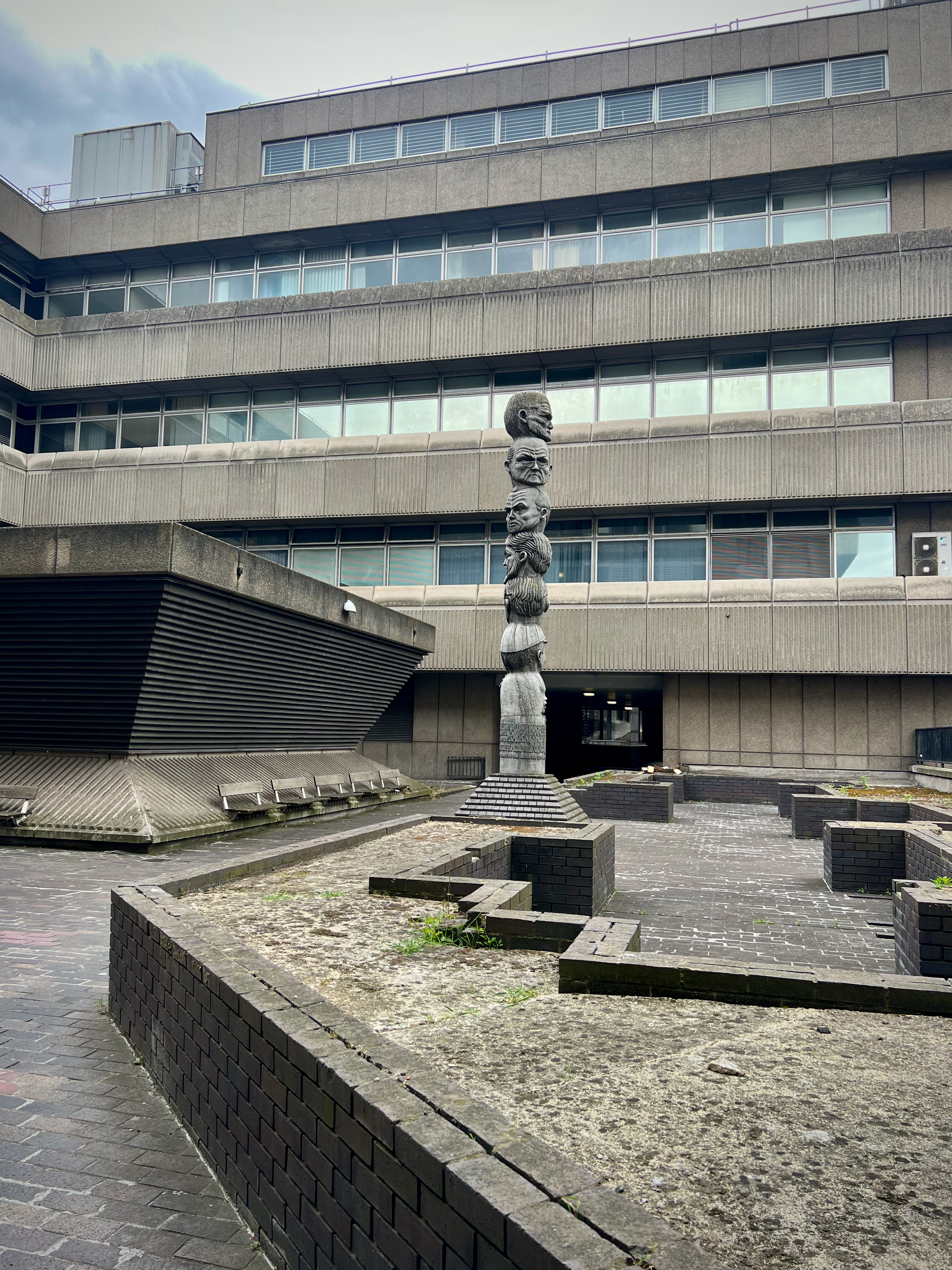
Baynard House and sculpture The Seven Ages of Man by Richard Kindersley

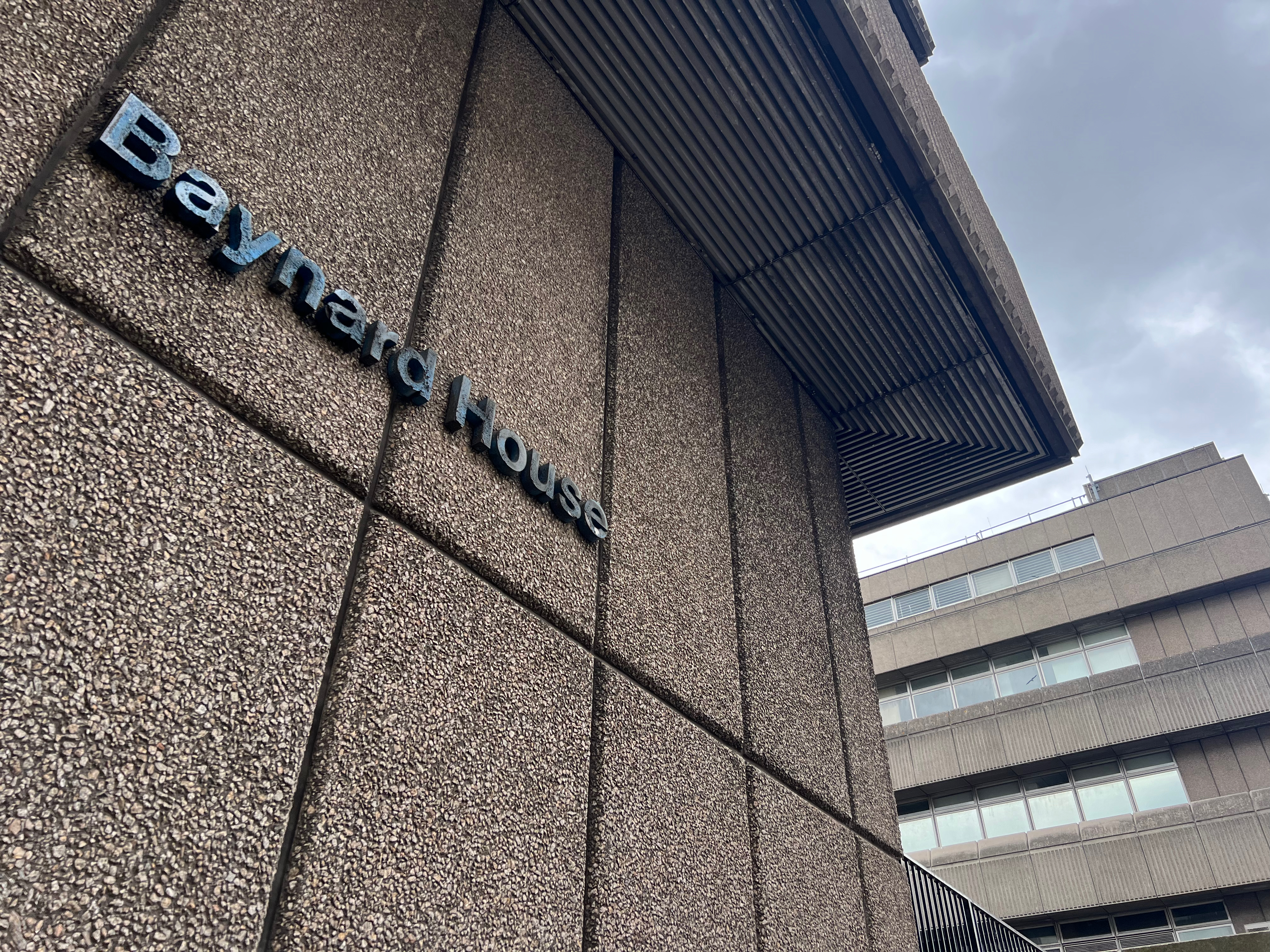
Baynard House sign
