= National Savings and Investments =

State-owned savings bank in the United Kingdom

National Savings and Investments Welsh: Cynilion a Buddsoddiadau Cenedlaethol
- Type: Non-ministerial government department of HM Treasury
- Industry: Financial services
- Founded: 1861; 165 years ago
- Headquarters: London, England, UK
- Key people: Luke Jensen, interim chairman; Jim Harra, interim chief executive
- Products: Savings and investments
- Number of employees: ▲265 (2025)
- Website: nsandi.com

National Savings and Investments (NS&I), formerly called the Post Office Savings Bank and National Savings, is a state-owned savings bank in the United Kingdom, based in London, England.

It is both a non-ministerial government department and an executive agency of HM Treasury. The aim of NS&I has been to attract funds from individual savers in the UK for the purpose of funding the government's deficit. NS&I attracts savers through offering savings products with tax-free elements on some products, and a 100% guarantee from HM Treasury on all deposits. As of 2017, approximately 9% of the government's debt is met by funds raised through NS&I, around half of which is from the Premium Bond offering.

== History ==
=== Post Office Savings Bank ===
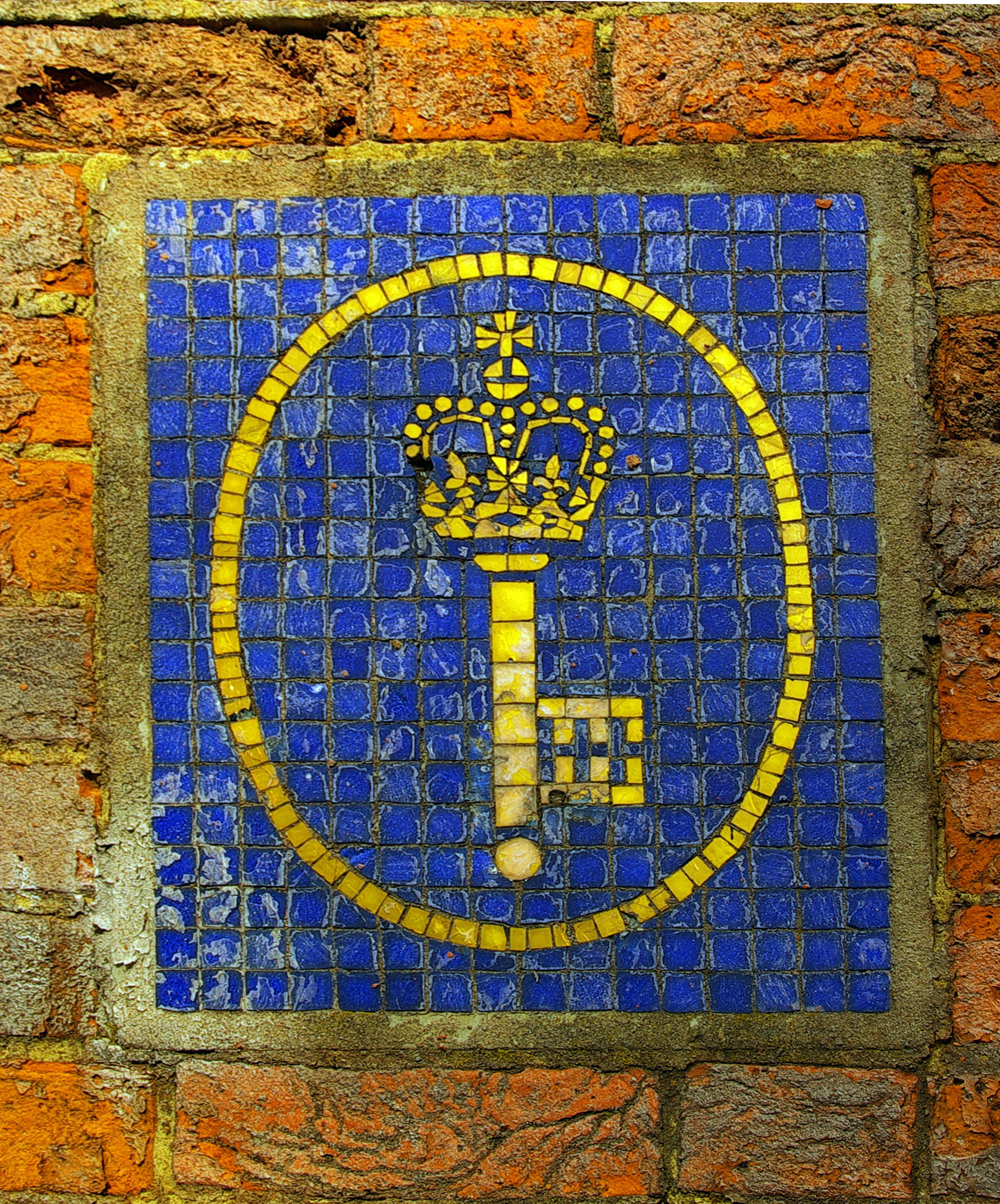
Logo used by the Post Office (and later the National) Savings Bank from 1936.

The Post Office Savings Bank (POSB) was founded in 1861 by the Palmerston government following a suggestion by George Chetwynd, a clerk in the Money Order department of the General Post Office. It was the world's first postal savings system. The aim of the bank was to allow ordinary workers a facility "to provide for themselves against adversity and ill-health", and to provide the government with access to debt funding; savers were paid a fixed rate of interest by the POSB, which used their deposits to purchase government securities, which offered a marginally higher rate of return.

Alongside Chetwynd, Frank Ives Scudamore was an early champion of the savings bank. At first, 700 Post Office branches offered the savings bank service; within two years their number had risen to 2,500. Since banks at the time only had branches in larger conurbations, the POSB provided a new opportunity for many individuals. Its services were also used by friendly societies and other mutuals. Under Postmaster General Henry Fawcett, the POSB was expanded and made more accessible; savings stamps were introduced in 1880.

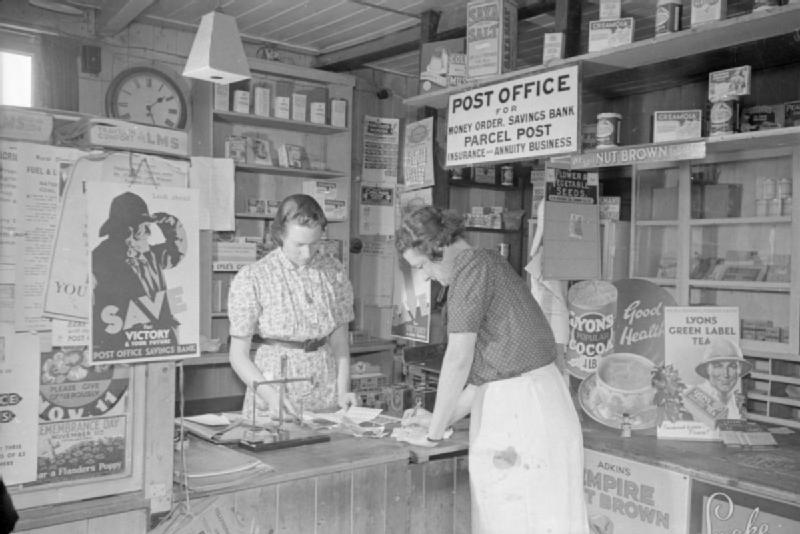
Mrs Scott, school mistress at the village school, visits the village Post Office in Lewknor and hands over the money she has collected for Savings Stamps for the last week (1941).

By the start of the 20th century the POSB had grown to become the largest banking system in the country, with 14,000 branches; it managed 8.5 million accounts with deposits totalling £140 million. Savings bank facilities were available for troops at the field post offices set up on the Western Front and elsewhere during the First World War. Savings certificates were issued in the First and Second World Wars to help finance the war effort. On 1 June 1957, the Premium Bonds draws were inaugurated, with the first prizes selected by ERNIE.

=== National Savings Bank ===
In 1969, when the GPO ceased to be a department of government, the bank was transferred from the Post Office to the Treasury. Its name was changed to National Savings Bank, and it gained an independent legal identity under the National Savings Bank Act 1971 (c. 29). Post Office branches continued to act as agents for the National Savings Bank. Despite its independence, it was used by Government in 1980 to fund a significant proportion of the public sector borrowing requirement. The then Director, Stuart Gilbert, was given a target of attracting £2 billion from savers.

=== NS&I ===
The name was changed again in 2002 to National Savings and Investments.

The previous graphic identity of NS&I, including the NS&I logotype, was created in 2005 by Lloyd Northover, the British design consultancy founded by John Lloyd and Jim Northover. The identity was updated in 2020.

=== Headquarters ===
The Post Office Savings Bank initially operated from a room in the General Post Office building on St. Martin's Le Grand in the City of London. By 1864 it had outgrown the space available there, so the Post Office took out a lease on a nearby warehouse at No. 27 St Paul's Churchyard. In the following years the business of the savings bank expanded, and further premises were acquired to the south, linked to the old warehouse by a bridge across Little Carter Lane. In the 1870s, with the lease on these buildings due to expire, work began on a new purpose-built Central Post Office Savings Bank building further to the south in Queen Victoria Street. The building had five floors plus a basement; the public business of the Savings Bank was conducted on the ground floor, and the clerks had their offices on the upper floors. An extension was built to the north, in Carter Lane, in 1890-94 by Sir Henry Tanner; but soon afterwards work began on a new headquarters in West Kensington: Blythe House, where the Post Office Savings Bank took up residence in 1903. (The premises on Queen Victoria Street and Carter Lane became a telephone exchange; the Faraday Building now stands on the site).

The Post Office Savings Bank continued to occupy Blythe House until the early 1970s, although it was announced in 1963 that its main centre of operations would be moved to Glasgow. A small headquarters staff remained in London, moving to Charles House on Kensington High Street.

== Role ==
NS&I managed around £150 billion in savings in 2017, and by 2024 this had risen to £231bn belonging to 24 million customers. Funds from NS&I have historically been a relatively cheap source of government borrowing. NS&I sets interest rates both to attract savers and provide low-cost finance for the government, and 100% of any individual's savings are guaranteed by HM Treasury; rules are in place to ensure that it does not offer market-leading products that would stifle competition.

== Operations ==
NS&I's head office is within the Department of Education building, in Westminster, London; with operational sites in Blackpool, Glasgow, and Durham. However, its back office and customer services operations are contracted out.

NS&I first outsourced out its operations in 1999 to Siemens Business Services; some 4,000 staff were transferred to Siemens, leaving 130 NS&I staff responsible for the design, management and marketing of products, and managing the relationship with Siemens. A 2000 report by the National Audit Office stated that the contract was better value than keeping the operations in-house, and suggested other government departments could learn from the way this public-private partnership was procured and managed. The Siemens business unit was acquired by French company Atos in 2011, and by 2023 the number of staff involved had reduced to just over 1,600.

The Atos contract was renewed for a further seven years in 2014, then extended to March 2024. In November 2023, a six-year customer services contract was awarded to Sopra Steria, another French company, after Atos missed performance targets.

In the past the bank offered many of its services through post offices, but in November 2011 it was announced that most products would only be available by phone, online, or by post; Premium Bonds would be the only remaining product sold in post offices. From August 2015, NS&I stopped selling Premium Bonds through post offices, and became a purely direct business.

== Products ==
NS&I offers a wide range of savings and investment products, specialising in tax-free and income-generating products. As of December 2019 the following are offered:

- Premium Bonds
- Direct ISA
- Junior ISA
- Income Bonds
- Direct Saver Account
- Investment Account

Some products are off-sale and only available for roll-over of maturing investments:

- Index-linked Savings Certificates
- Fixed Interest Savings Certificates
- Guaranteed Growth Bonds
- Guaranteed Income Bonds

=== Former products ===
NS&I products which are no longer available include:

- Children's Bonds
- Children's Bonus Bonds
- Investment Guaranteed Growth Bond
- TESSA-only ISA
- Fixed-Rate Savings Bonds
- Pensioners' Bonds and Capital Bonds
- Ordinary Account/Treasurer's Account/SAYE/Yearly Plan/Deposit Bonds
- FIRST Option Bonds
- National Savings Stamps and Gift Tokens
- Easy Access Savings Account

== Gallery ==
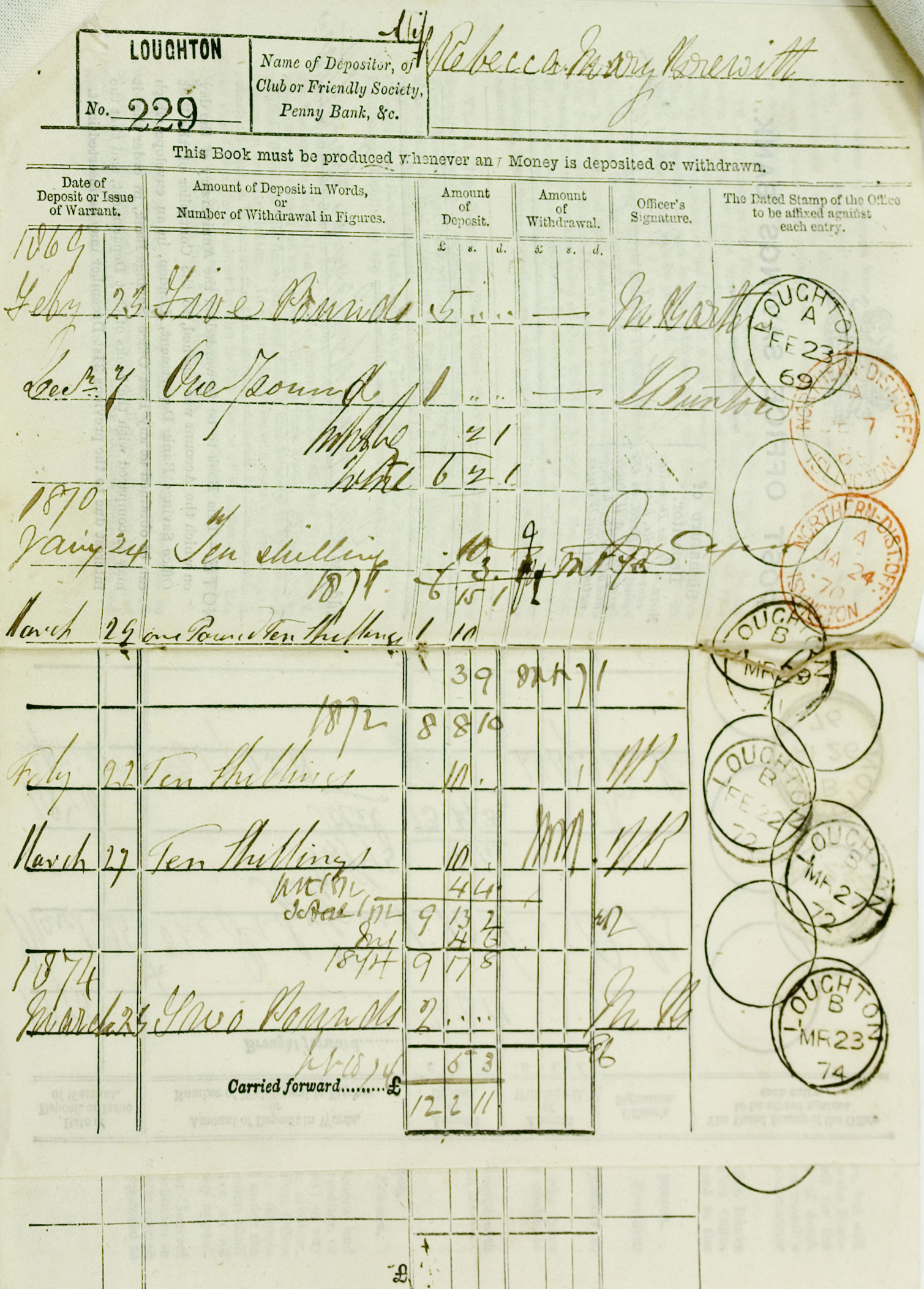
From the 1860s onwards, customers would take their deposit book, such as this 1869 example, to a Post Office each time they made a transaction

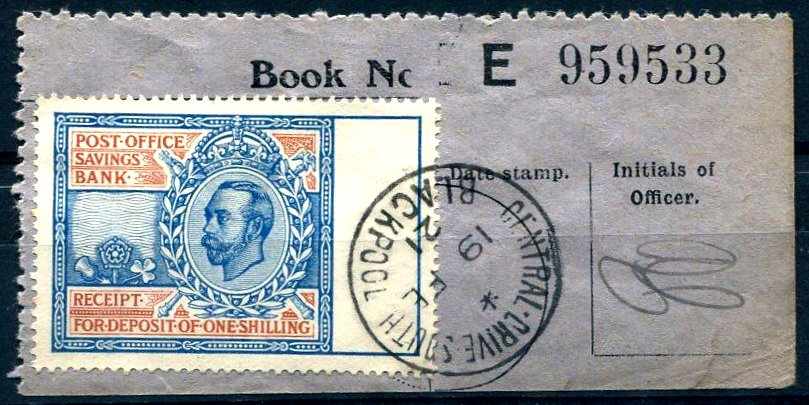
A 1921 receipt for a deposit of one shilling in the Post Office Savings Bank

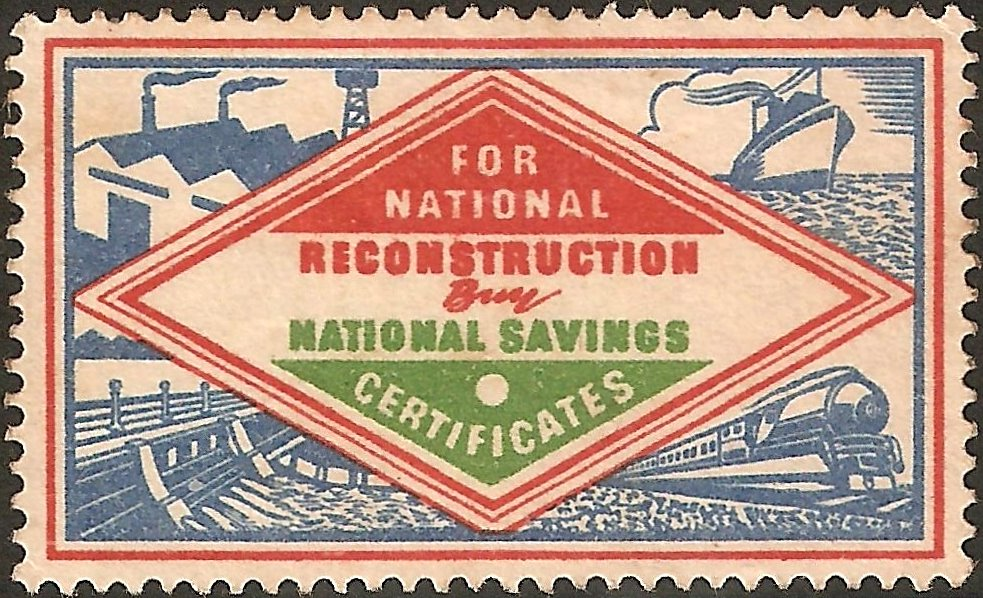
A publicity stamp from around the end of the Second World War urging investors to buy National Savings Certificates for National Reconstruction

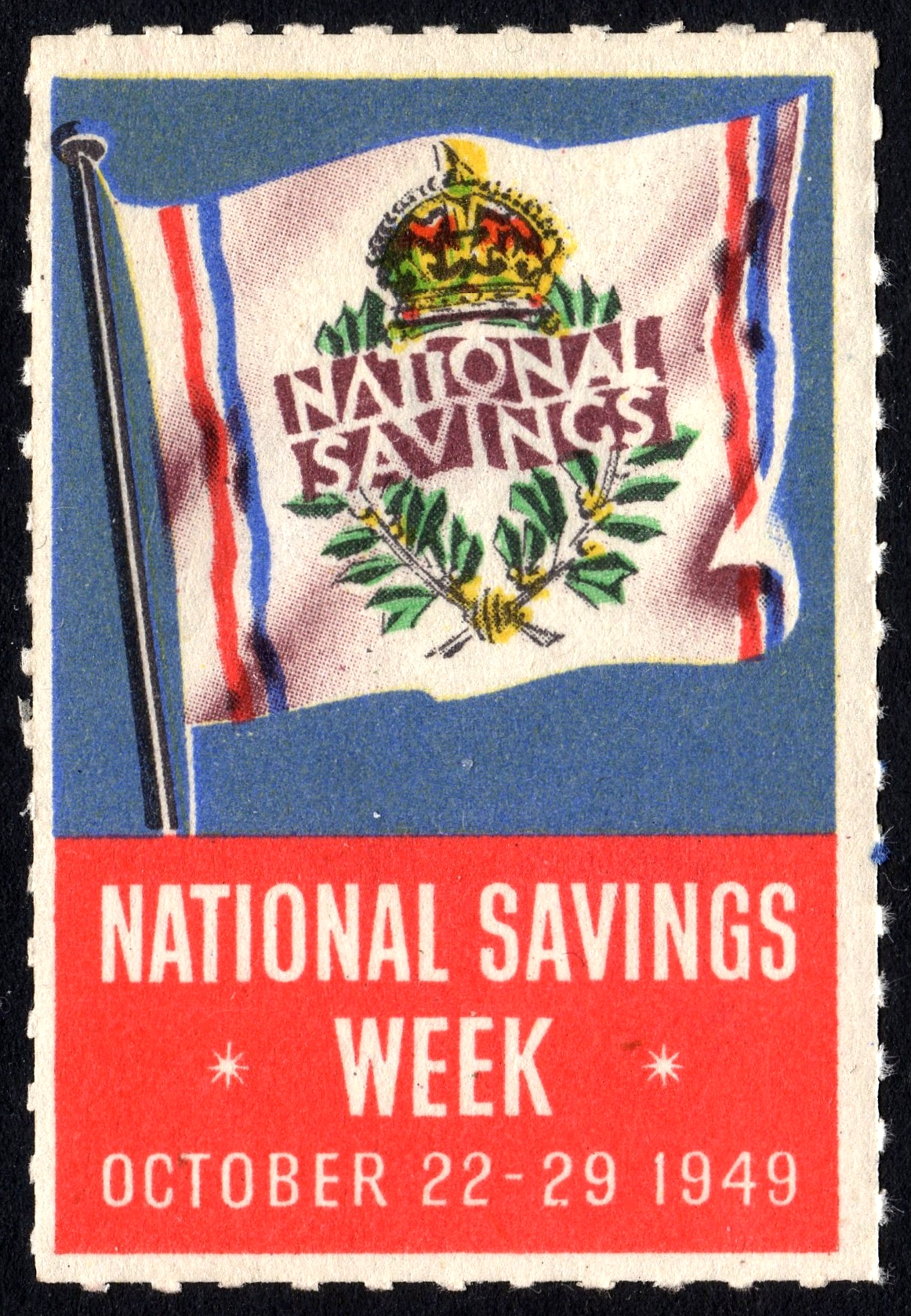
A National Savings Week publicity label from 1949

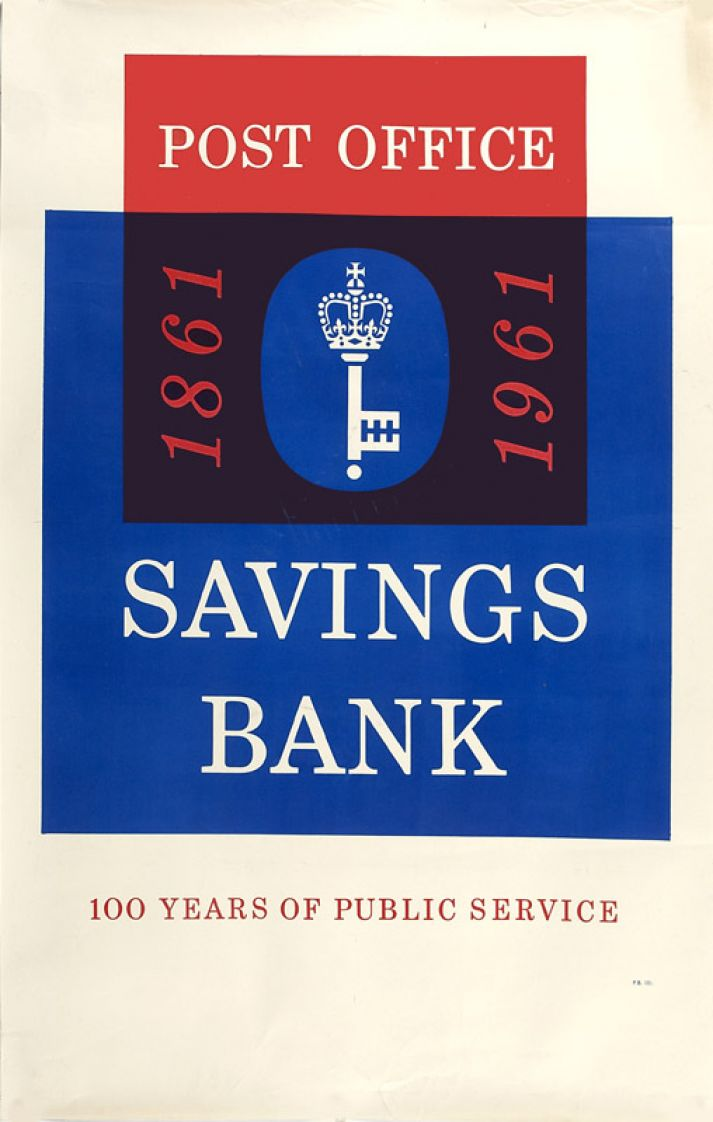
The Post Office Savings Bank celebrated its centenary in 1961.

== See also ==
- National Savings Movement
- National Girobank
- Rainbow Dance, Post Office Savings Bank film, 1936
- Blythe House, London, headquarters 1903–1970s
