= Richard Kindersley =

British artist (1939–2025)

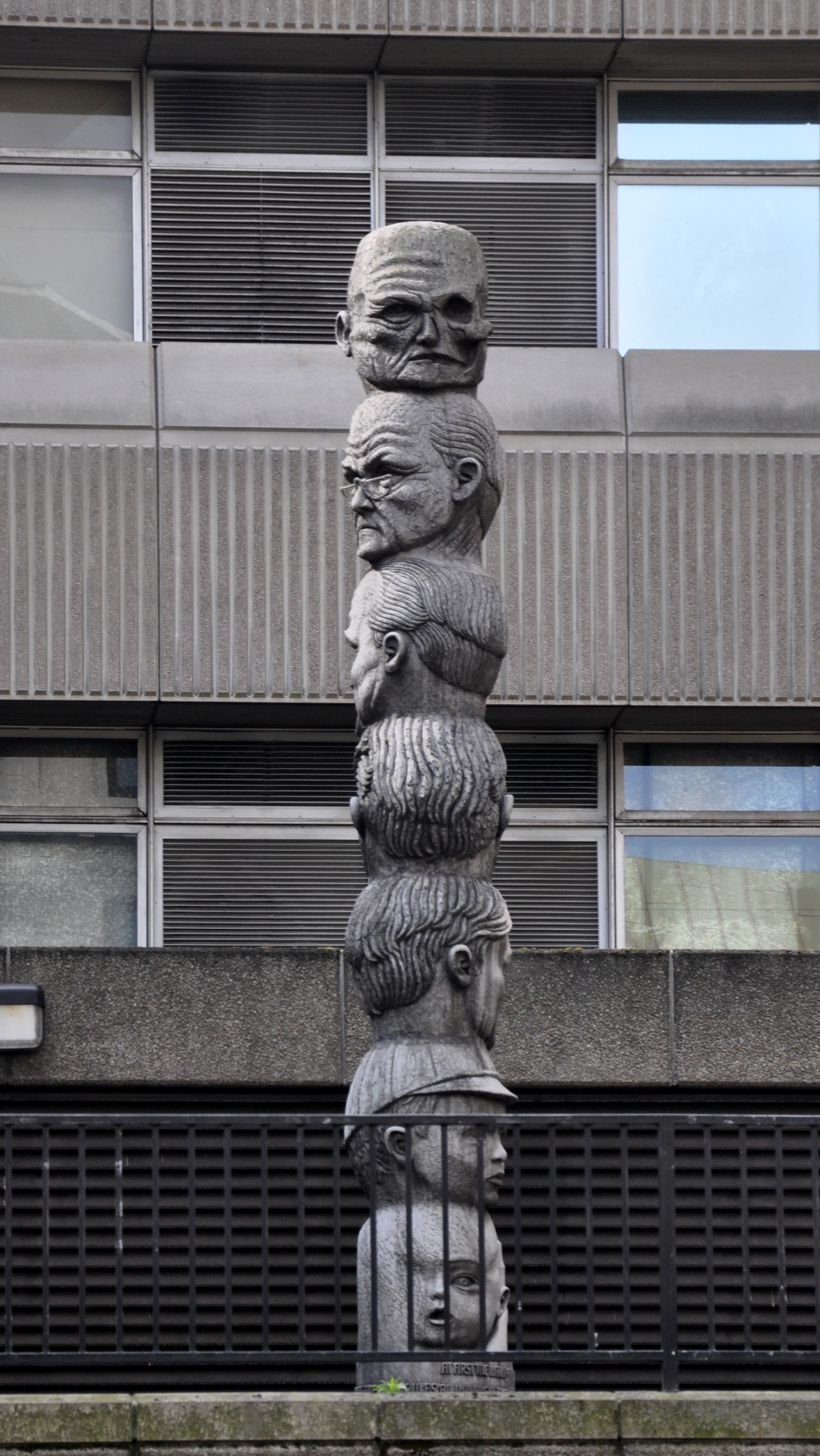
The Seven Ages of Man, 1980

Richard James Kindersley (14 May 1939 – 27 November 2025) was a British typeface designer, stone letter carver and sculptor.

== Life and career ==
Kindersley was born in London. He studied lettering and sculpture at Cambridge School of Art and in the workshop of his father David Kindersley, who was also a noted stone carver.

His major public sculpture is the Seven Ages of Man, located outside Baynard House in the City of London. Unveiled in April 1980, it depicts the seven ages from Shakespeare's "All the world's a stage" monologue.

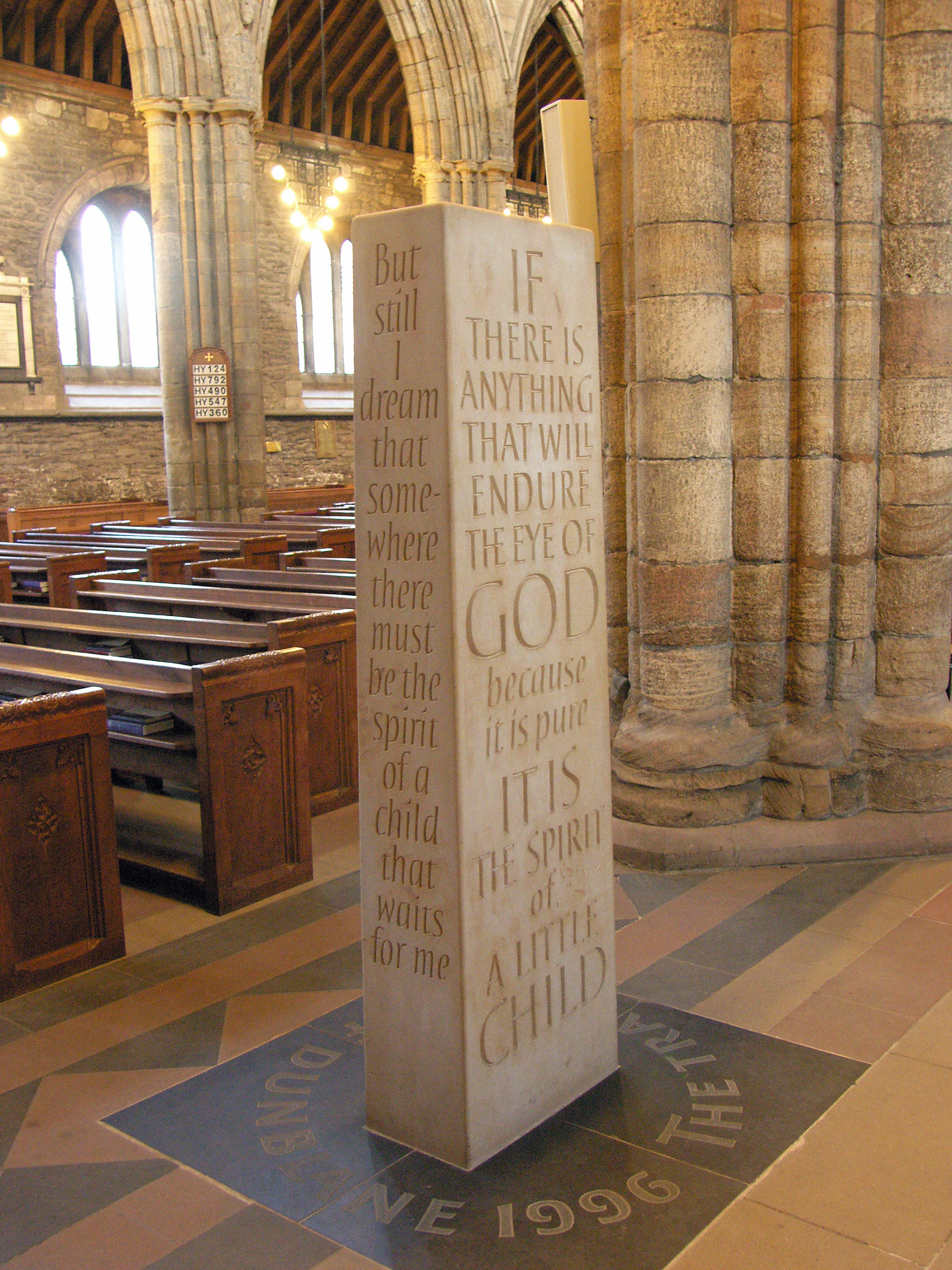
Dunblane massacre memorial

He also constructed a modern stone circle called The Millennium Stones created during 1998 to 1999 in Gatton Park, Surrey, to mark the double millennium from AD1 to AD2000. The first stone in the series is inscribed with the words from John 1:1, "in the beginning the word was". The subsequent nine stones are carved with quotations contemporary with each 200 year segment, ending with the words of T. S. Eliot.

Kindersley contributed sculpting and lettering to a number of memorials, including the British Normandy Memorial, the Dunblane massacre memorial in Dunblane Cathedral, and a memorial at St Paul's Cathedral to Londoners killed by World War II bombing.

He was a fellow of the Royal Society of Arts, and in 2001 became an honorary fellow of the Royal Institute of British Architects. He was also given the Freedom of the City of London. He died on 27 November 2025, at the age of 86.

== Gallery ==
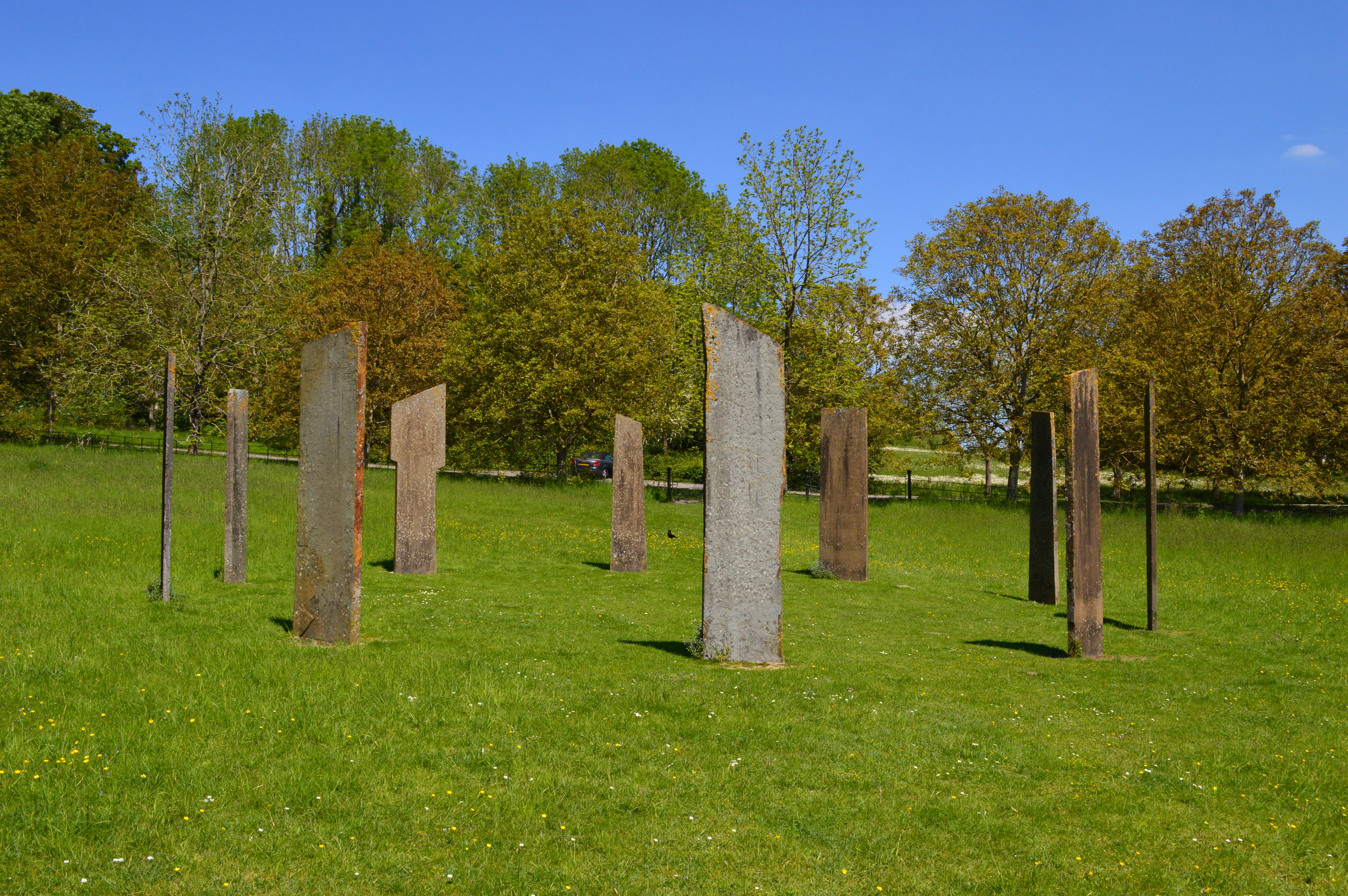
The Millennium Stones, Gatton Park

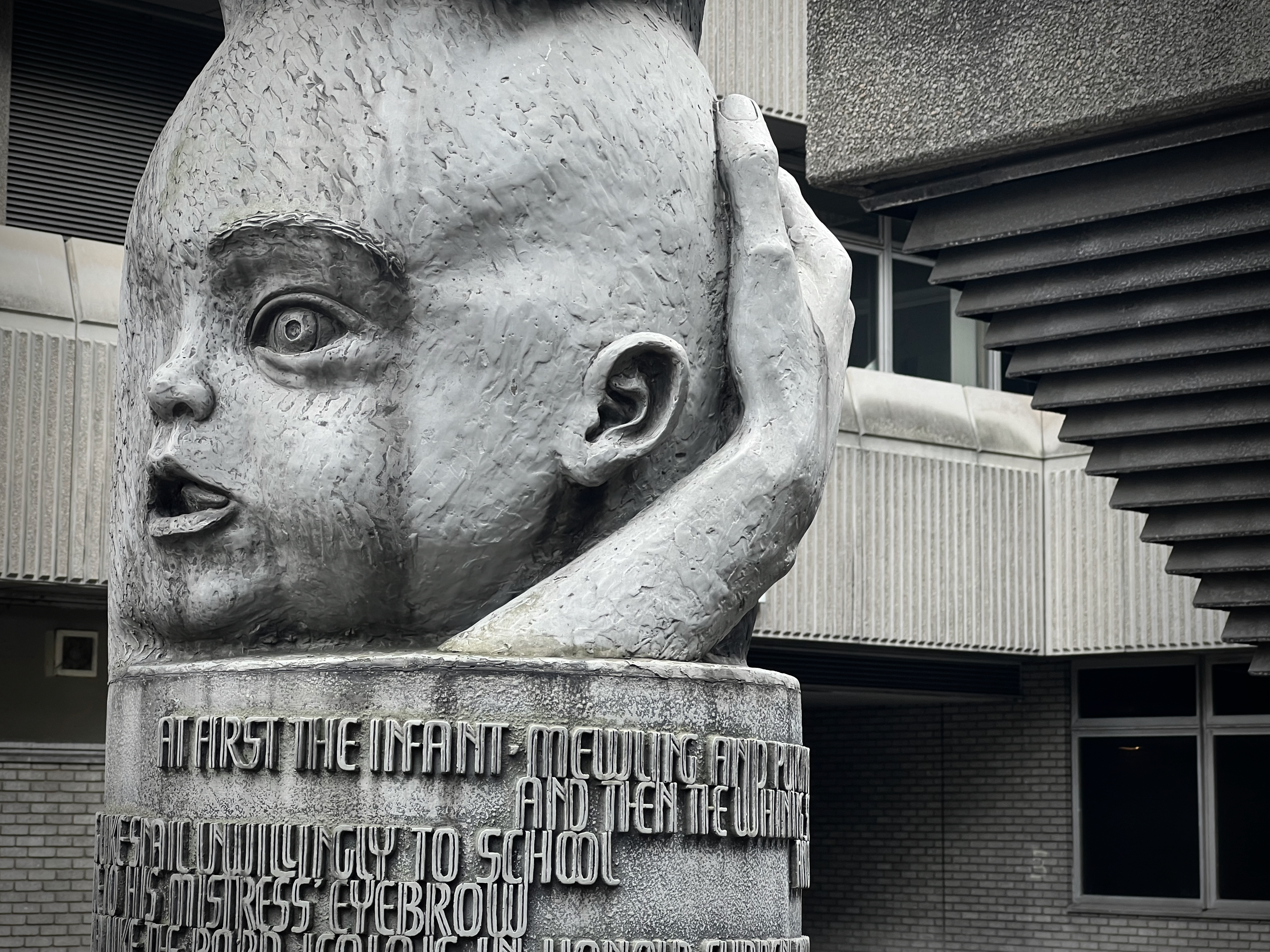
Close up of The Seven Ages of Man at Baynard House, London

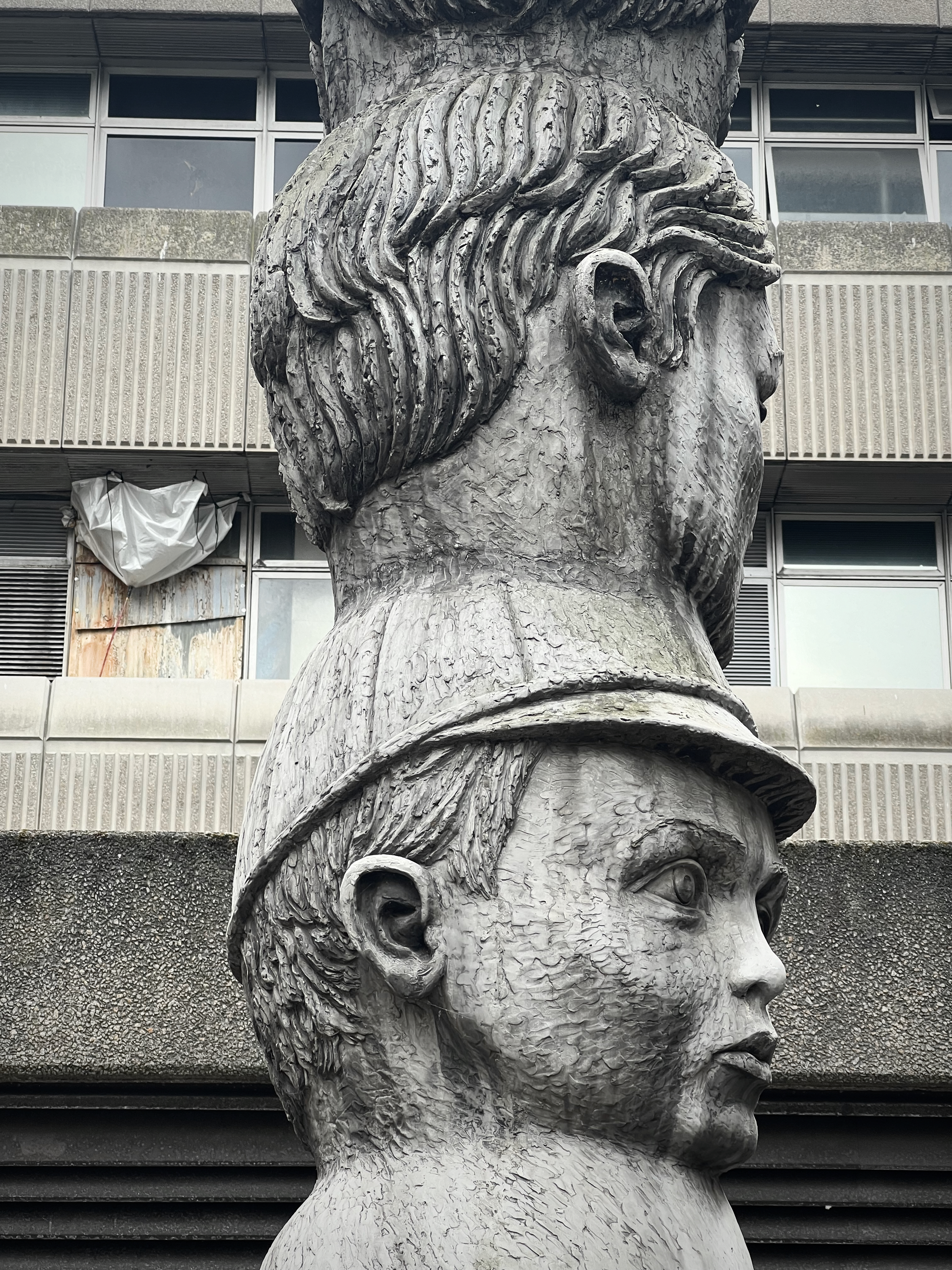
Close up of The Seven Ages of Man

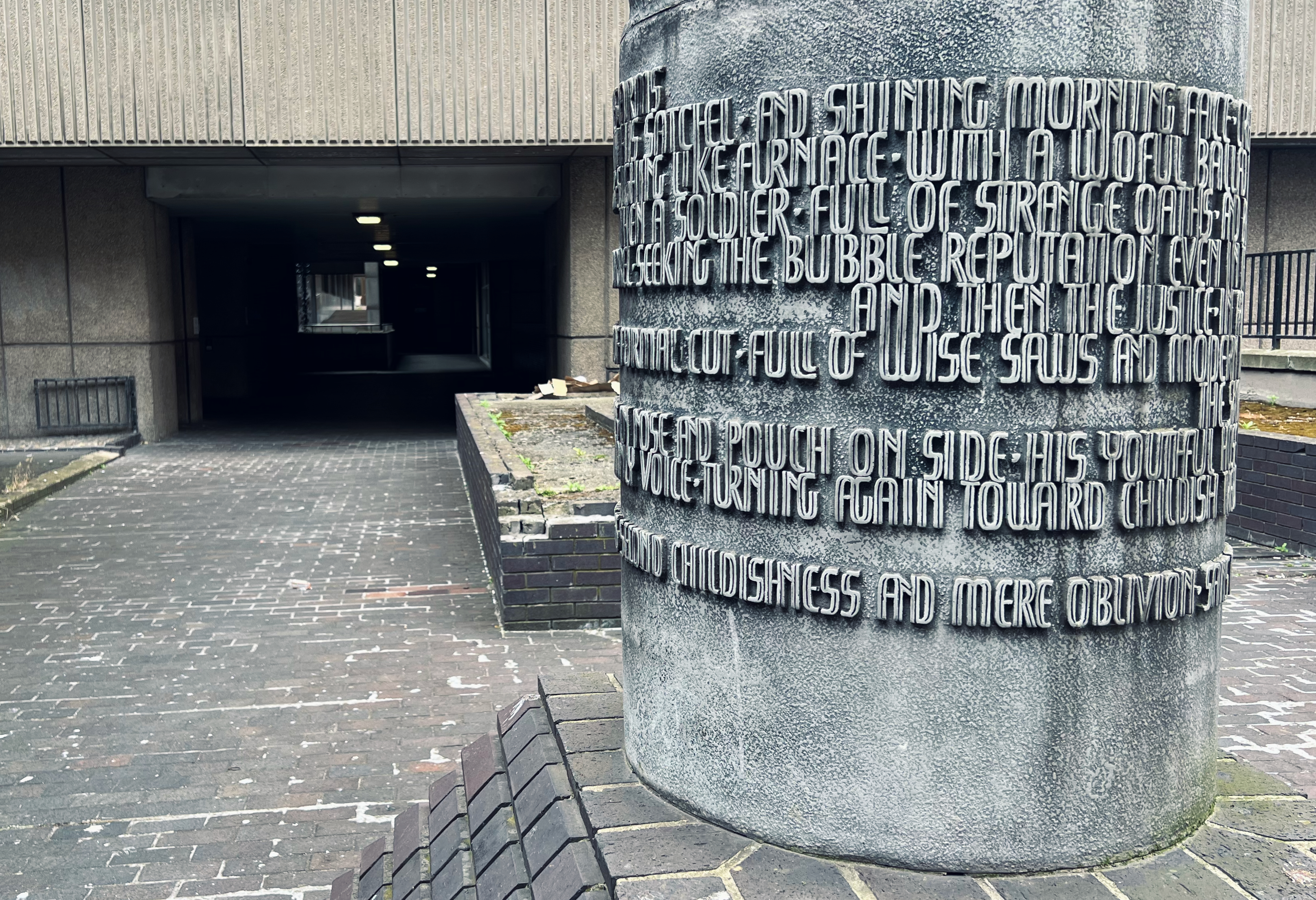
Close up of text on The Seven Ages of Man

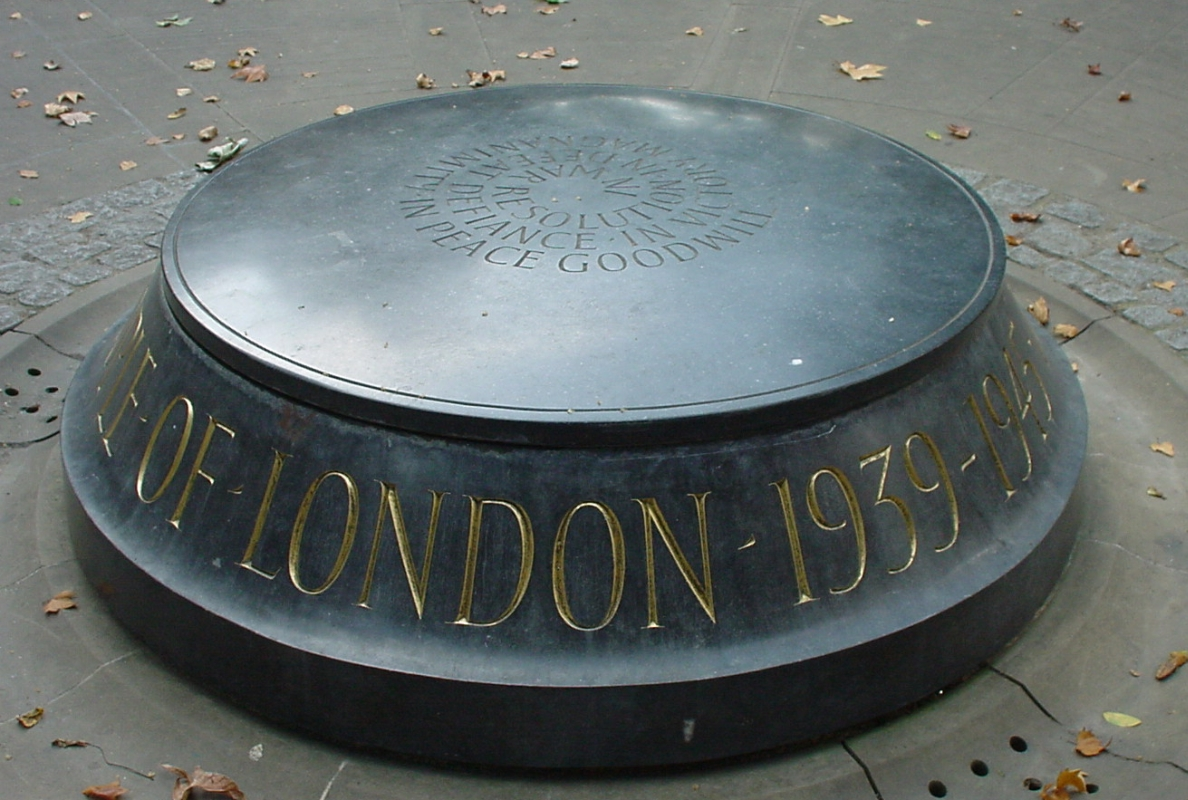
People of London memorial at St Paul's Cathedral

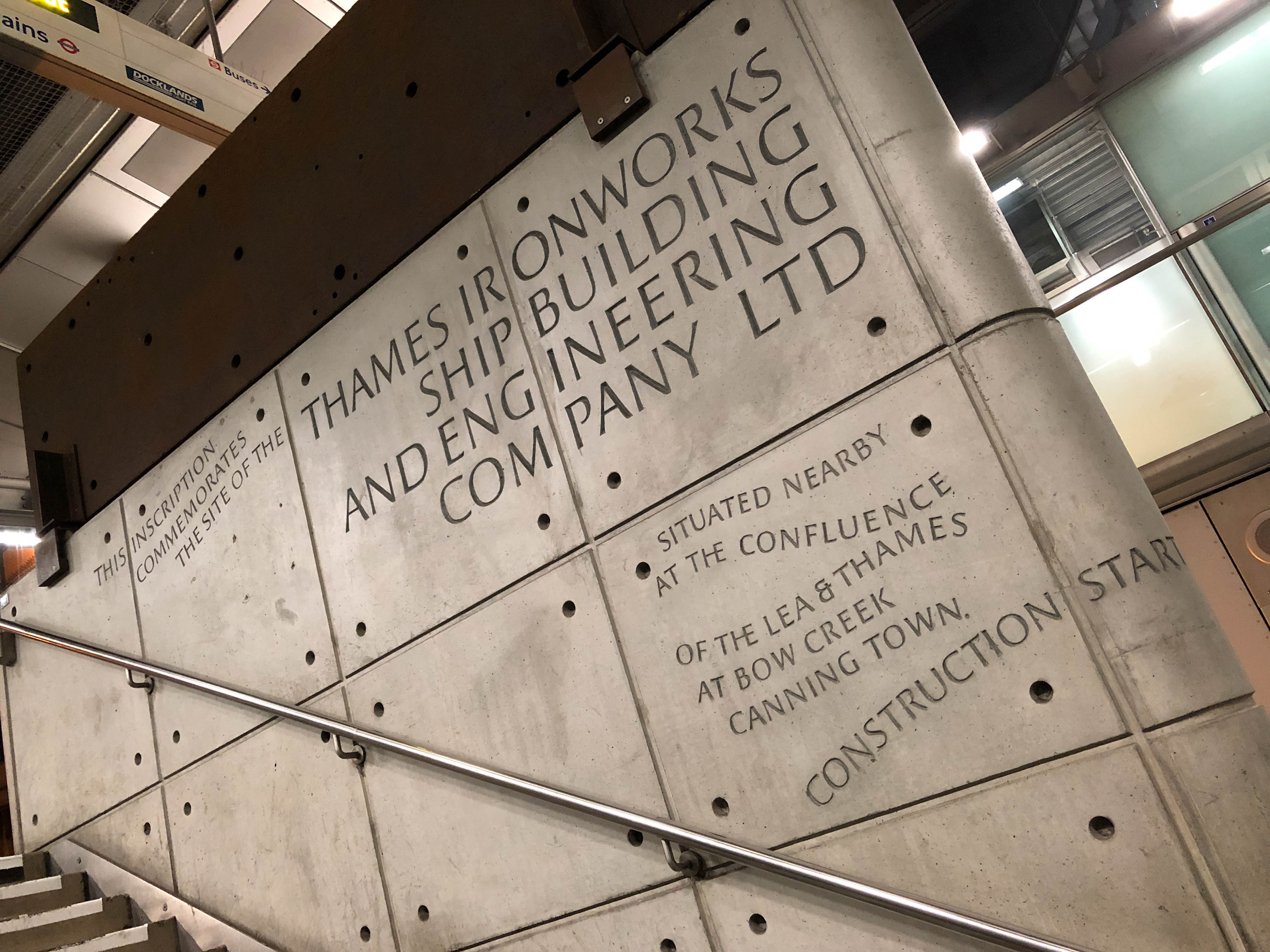
Artwork at Canning Town station commemorating the nearby Thames Ironworks and Shipbuilding Company
