= Chetwynd =

Chetwynd or Chetwynde may refer to:

- Chetwynd (surname)
- Chetwynd, British Columbia
  - Chetwynd Airport
  - Chetwynd Secondary School
- Chetwynd, Shropshire
- Chetwynde School, a private school in Barrow-in-Furness, Cumbria, England
- Chetwynd Barracks
- Chetwynd, Victoria, Australia

== See also ==
- Chetwynd baronets
- Viscount Chetwynd
- Chetwynd-Talbot, a family name associated with the Earl of Shrewsbury and Earl Talbot
