= Index-linked Savings Certificates =

Index-linked Savings Certificates are British inflation linked bonds from National Savings and Investments, the state-owned savings bank in the United Kingdom. The bond terms are typically 2, 3 or 5 years. The returns are linked to Retail Price Index (RPI) with a tiny added interest rate on top. The Bonds can now only be cashed in at maturity.

Index-linked Savings Certificates are free from UK income tax making them relatively attractive to tax-payers, particularly higher rate tax-payers. They are backed by the Treasury of the UK Government so are considered to be safe deposits. The certificates used to be informally known as "Granny Bonds" because they were originally only available to savers who were over the retirement age. This is no longer the case.

== Issues ==
The bonds come in issues. Each issue has a per person investment limit, which as of 2011 was £15,000.

3 Year Issues
Date	Issue	Return
19 July 2010	withdrawn	N/A
7 April 2010	20th Issue	RPI + 1.00%
29 April 2009	19th Issue	RPI + 1.00%
18 June 2008	18th Issue	RPI + 1.00%
21 May 2008	17th Issue	RPI + 0.70%
2 April 2008	16th Issue	RPI + 0.25%
25 April 2007	15th Issue	RPI + 1.35%
26 October 2006	14th Issue	RPI + 1.15%
20 May 2006	13th Issue	RPI + 1.05%
13 April 2006	12th Issue	RPI + 0.90%

5 Year Issues
Date	Issue	Return
7 September 2011	withdrawn	N/A
12 May 2011	48th Issue	RPI + 0.50%
19 July 2010	withdrawn	N/A
7 April 2010	47th Issue	RPI + 1.00%
29 April 2009	46th Issue	RPI + 1.00%
18 June 2008	45th Issue	RPI + 1.00%
21 May 2008	44th Issue	RPI + 0.70%
2 April 2008	43rd Issue	RPI + 0.35%
25 April 2007	42nd Issue	RPI + 1.35%
20 May 2006	41st Issue	RPI + 1.15%
13 April 2006	40th Issue	RPI + 0.95%

2 Year Issues
Date	Issue	Return
13 April 2006	?th Issue	RPI + 0.85%

On 19 July 2010, due to high investment levels the certificates were withdrawn from general sale in order to keep investments within the financing target set by HM Treasury. After re-introduction in May 2011, this happened again on 7 September 2011.
