= Faraday Building =

Building in the City of London

Coordinates: 51.5122°N 0.1002°W

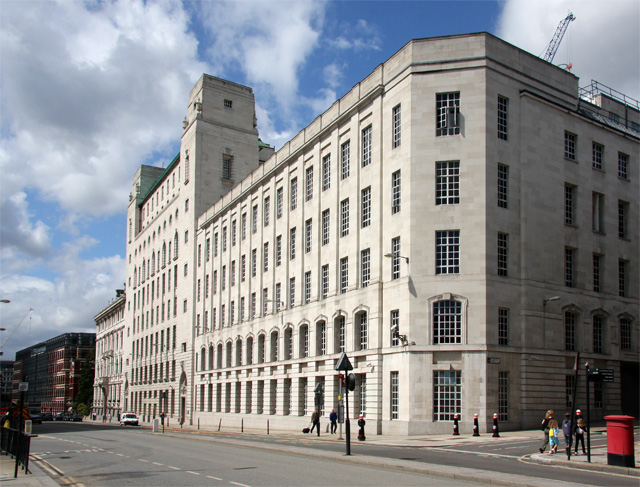
The building's main façade of 26 ½ bays on Queen Victoria Street, also showing part of its narrower front to Godliman Street

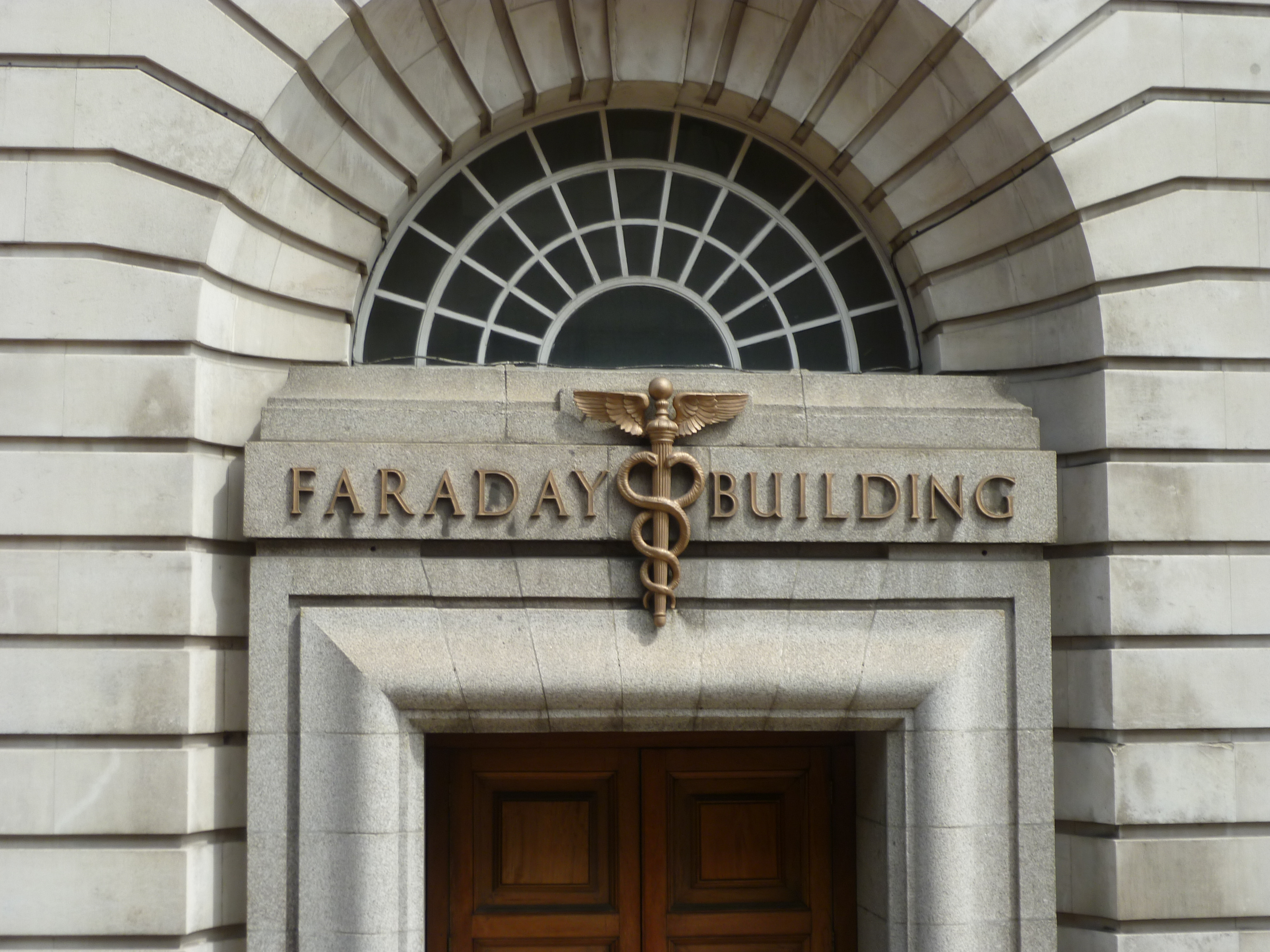
The building's entrance

The Faraday Building is in the southwest of the City of London close to St Paul's Cathedral. The land was first acquired by the General Post Office in the 1870s, for the Post Office Savings Bank.

In 1902 it was converted to a GPO telephone exchange serving sections of London, and underwent several capacity expansions over the next several years. The eastern extension of the building stands on the site of Doctors' Commons whose members had lower-courts say in ecclesiastical (including, during its currency, probate and divorce) and admiralty matters.

In 1933 the original building was rebuilt to house the International Telephone Exchange, more than doubling the size of the building as a whole. The new building included a raised central portion with decorative turrets which was highly controversial at the time as it blocked the view of St Paul's Cathedral from the River Thames. This led to a new law that restricted the height of new buildings in London to protect the sightlines of the Cathedral.

Although generally five storeys high, the central section and rectangular turrets roughly double that and remain a high point in the area in spite of a century of new building in the area. It fronts Queen Victoria Street and backs onto Knightrider Street. The complex is one narrow block west from Peter's Hill which is the northern footpath to/from the Millennium Bridge; the College of Arms stands in the intervening space.

BT Group (which took over the General Post Office's telephone services in the early 1980s) still uses the building, although today it is rented as general offices and retail space.

== History ==
=== Former buildings ===
The building began as 'Central' telephone exchange at the Post Office Savings Bank at Queen Victoria Street, opening for business on 1 March 1902 with just 200 subscribers. The Central Post Office Savings Bank building at 144 Queen Victoria Street dated from 1880; designed by James Williams of the Office of Works, it had been built alongside the British and Foreign Bible Societies building (which still stands at No. 146) and was, at over 80 feet (24 m) high, the loftiest building in the street at that time. In 1890-94 an extension was built in Carter Lane, immediately to the north, by Sir Henry Tanner, linked to the earlier building by a bridge and a tunnel, over and under Knightrider Street.

In 1903 the Post Office Savings Bank moved out to new purpose-built premises (Blythe House) in West Kensington, whereupon the GPO Money Order & Postal Order Department, along with a new Central Telephone Exchange, took over the vacated buildings.

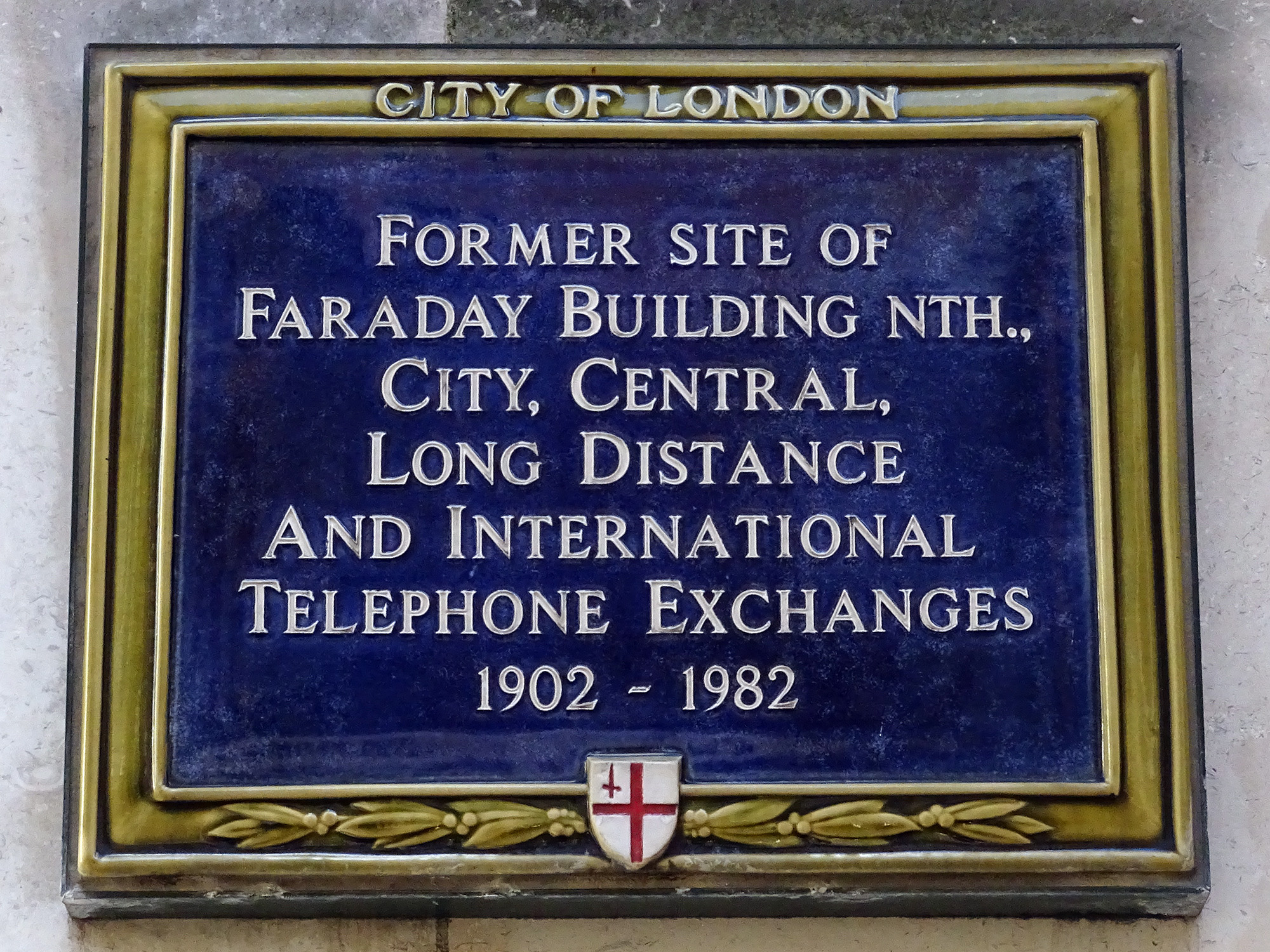
Blue plaque on the site of Tanner's Central Savings Bank extension, recording its use as Faraday Building North from 1902 to 1982.

The Post Office's first London telephone exchange served nearly two and a half square miles (6 km^{2}) of the capital – notable subscribers included the Treasury, the War Office and Fleet Street. Take-up of the telephone by the public was very quick so that by 1905 the exchange capacity was extended to 10,000 subscribers, and full capacity was exhausted just three years later. To meet the growing demand from businesses in the City, a new common battery exchange was installed in 1906 with a capacity of 15,000 lines. This became 'City' exchange and officially opened in November 1907. In common with other exchanges in London, Central was able to connect subscribers to the Electrophone exchange at Gerard Street. This allowed people to listen to performances at certain London theatres and music halls while sitting at home.

In 1911 the Money Order and Postal Order department moved out of Queen Victoria Street to new premises in Manor Gardens, off Holloway Road.

=== Current building ===
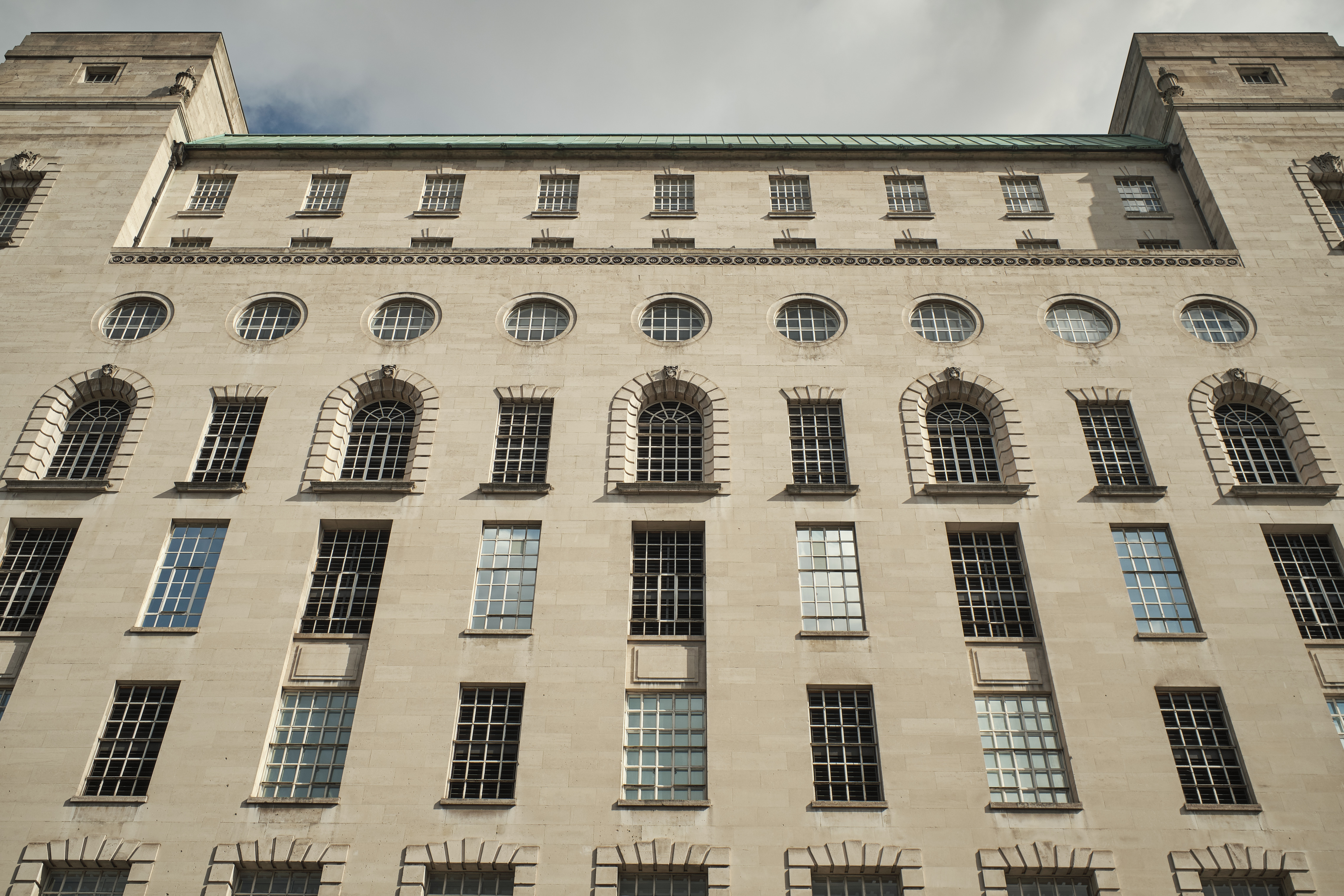
Upper part of the 1933 building.

The present edifice, known as the Faraday Building, replaced the old Savings Bank building in Queen Victoria Street. Designed by the architect A. R. Myers for the Office of Works, it was completed in 1933. That same year the international telephone exchange was opened at Faraday. In 1935, an automatic exchange was opened with more than 6,000 working lines. The complex task of switching subscribers over to the new exchange involved 60 engineers working for more than 15 months.

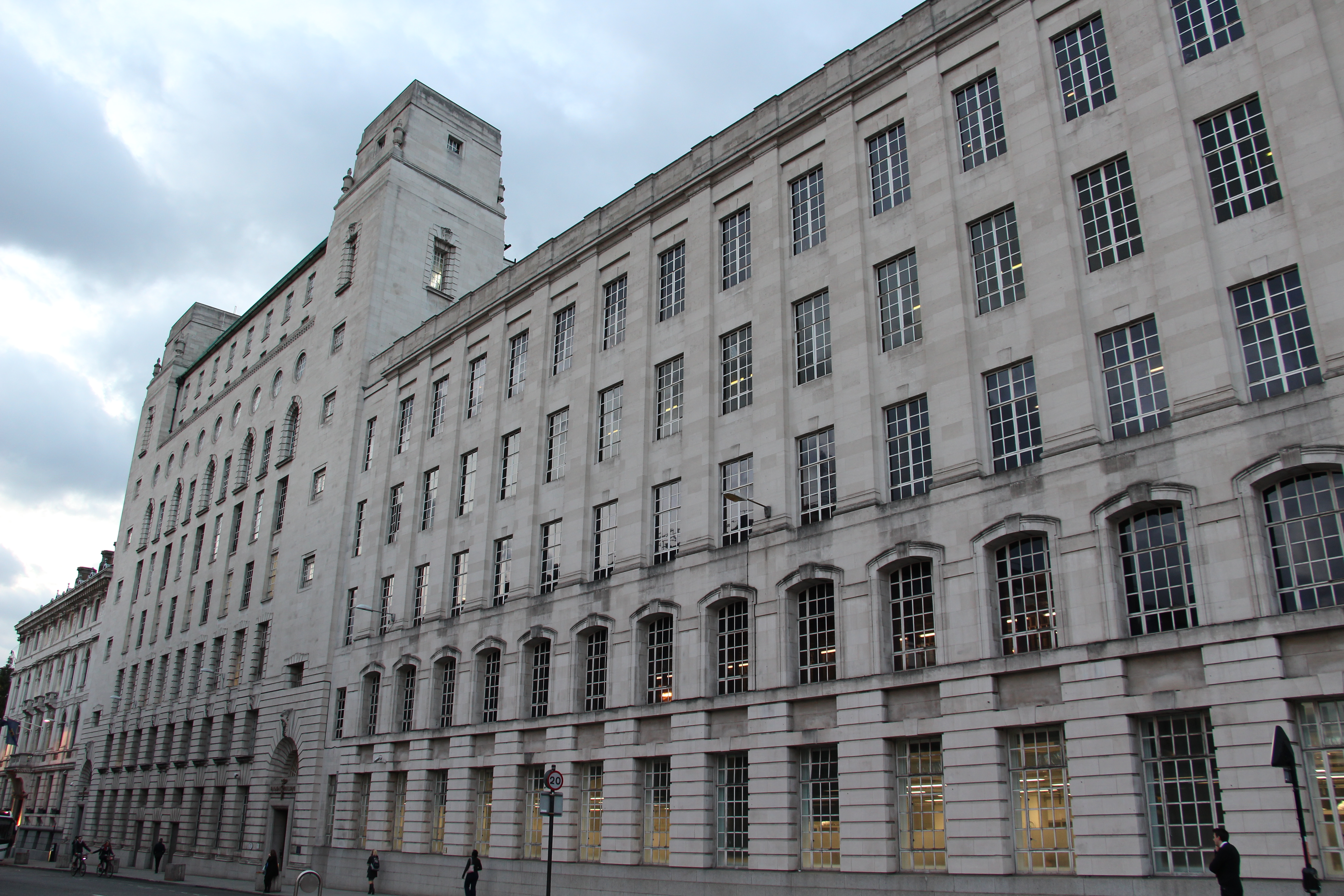
The 1939 extension (right).

The building was extended to the east along Queen Victoria Street (at a lower elevation) in 1938-39. To the north of this extension (on the other side of Knightrider Street), a 'tall windowless concrete shelter [...] called The Citadel' was built in 1942, adjoining the old Savings Bank extension in Carter Lane. Excavated to a depth of thirty feet, this was designed to provide bomb-proof accommodation for the Communications department. The Citadel was re-clad and extended upwards in 1962-64. On the opposite side of Queen Victoria Street, Baynard House was built (1974-79) to provide further accommodation for the exchange.

The buildings north of Knightrider Street (Tanner's Savings Bank extension and the World War II Citadel) were demolished in the early 2000s.

== Architecture and streetscape ==
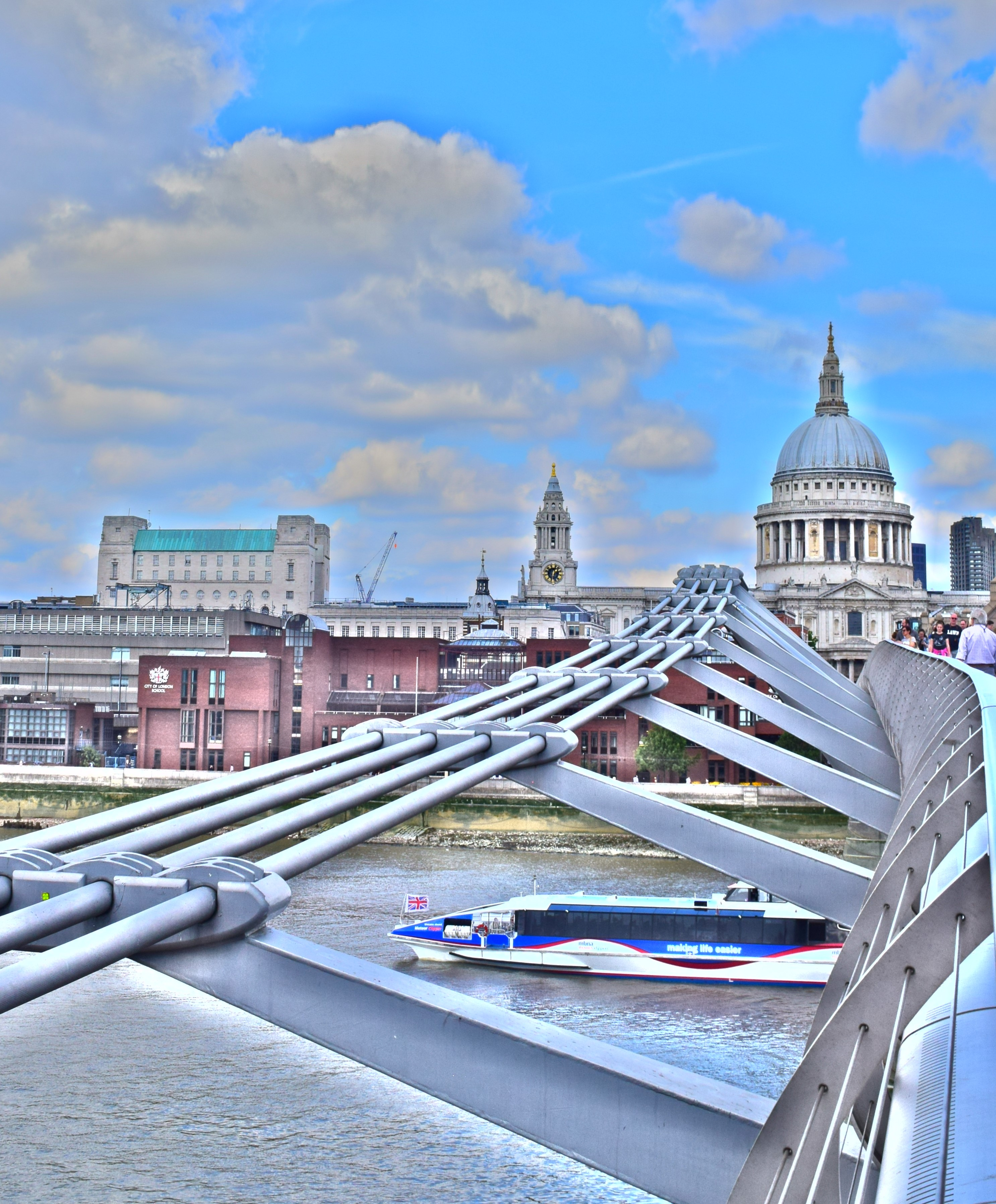
The building (left) as seen from the Millennium Bridge.

The building is cream-coloured. It has one-bay chamfered corners on its east side (Godliman Street) which mean the footprint of the building is, at fine level, an irregular hexagon rather than its general form of a slightly tapering rectangle. Its southwestern quarter hosts bays that rise (a further five) to ten storeys, with rectangular turrets and recessed upper storeys. The windows across the western "half" of the building give away its on average lower ceiling height and this section slightly projects from the rest of the main, long, façade (which was added a few years later).

One building is attached, the older № 146 Queen Victoria Street, which matches in colour and has been adapted as a place of Scientology training.

The construction of the Faraday Building obscured the riverside view of upper parts of St Paul's Cathedral. This led directly to regulations protecting views to and from the dome from a number of vantage points by restricting the height of new buildings constructed in certain designated areas. The City of London School and another telephone exchange, Baynard House, were built between the riverside and Faraday Building but are restricted in height to just three levels above ground.
