= Catana Chetwynd =

American cartoonist

- Occupation: Cartoonist
- Known for: Catana Comics

Catana Chetwynd is an American cartoonist and author of Catana Comics. Catana has also authored three books: Little Moments Of Love, Snug: A Collection Of Comics About Dating Your Best Friend, and In Love & Pajamas: A Collection of Comics about Being Yourself Together.

== Biography ==
Catana Chetwynd grew up in Saratoga Springs, New York, where she spent her time drawing and studying psychology in State University of New York at Plattsburgh.

After her boyfriend John Freed encouraged her to start a comic about their relationship on Thanksgiving Day 2016, Catana created the first comic briefly afterwards and five more in the following days.

Catana currently works on Catana Comics full-time and is the author of four books, including bestselling Little Moments Of Love, a collection of comics, and Snug: A Collection Of Comics About Dating Your Best Friend. After a tour in the United States, the cartoonist cancelled a tour in the United Kingdom in 2020 over “public health concerns” during the COVID-19 pandemic.

== Works ==
- Little Moments of Love
- Snug: A Collection Of Comics About Dating Your Best Friend
- In Love & Pajamas: A Collection of Comics about Being Yourself Together
- You are Home

== Personal life ==
Chetwynd currently lives in North Carolina with her fiancé, John Freed, and their dogs Murphy and Ringo.
