= George Chetwynd (civil servant) =

George Chetwynd (1824 – 3 December 1882) was the Receiver and Accountant General of the British Post Office.

In 1860, when working as a junior bookkeeper in the Money Order Office of the General Post Office, Chetwynd proposed the establishment of a network of Post Office Savings Banks 'having for its object the security of money deposited at Savings Banks, and the encouragement of the working classes in provident habits'. The Post Office Savings Bank was established in the UK the following year, with Chetwynd appointed to be its Controller.

In 1874 (by which time he had been promoted to the senior office of Receiver and Accountant General), Chetwynd conceived of the postal order as a cheaper alternative to the more cumbersome money order (though it was 1 January 1881 before the first "post office notes" finally went on sale). Chetwynd's scheme was so successful that when the scheme started, around 1.5 million notes were printed by Bradbury Wilkinson but another million had to be printed by the end of 1881. Despite postal orders being a form of money order, the Money Order Office initially refused to have anything to do with the innovation, so Chetwynd's own Receiver and Accountant General's Department administered the postal order system (more than twenty years passed before the Postal Order Branch and Money Order Department were finally amalgamated).

George Chetwynd died at Blackheath, London, aged 58.
