= List of acts of the New Zealand Parliament (1840–1890) =

The first enactment of the New Zealand parliament (General Assembly), created by the New Zealand Constitution Act 1852, was the English Laws Act 1854, which established the applicability of all English laws in effect 14 January 1840, to New Zealand. The New Zealand Constitution Act 1846 was never implemented and was suspended.

This is a list of acts of the New Zealand Parliament for the period up to and including part of the first year of the Liberal Government of New Zealand.

== 1840s ==
=== 1841 ===
- County Courts Act
- Courts of Requests Act
- Customs Act Amended: 1844/46/1914/20/21/22/23/24/26/27/29/59/65/67/68/70/71/72/73/76/81/82/85/86/87/88/89/90/91/92/94/95/96
- Distillation Act Amended: 1918/58/59/61/86 Repealed: 1844
- Juries Act Amended: 1844/1951/57/59/60/61/62/63/66/67/68/74/75/76/79/82/85/94/2000/01
- Land Registration Act Amended: 1852
- Local and Personal Ordinances Act
- New South Wales Act 4 Vict No 7 Repealed Act
- New South Wales Laws Adopted Act
- New Zealand Banking Company Act
- Police Magistrates Act
- Sessions Courts Act
- Supreme Court Act Amended: 1846/48/66

=== 1842 ===
- Auctioneers Act Amended: 1844/1910/15/57/64/77
- Cattle Trespass Act Amended: 1844 Repealed: 1846
- Churches and Chapels Act
- Conveyancing Act Amended: 1844
- Copyright Act Amended: 1924/67/71/85/86/89/90/96/97/99/2005
- Harbours Act Amended: 1844/1908/10/12/13/14/21/22/25/33/48/52/56/57/59/61/62/63/64/65/66/67/68/69/70/71/74/75/77/80/81/83/88/89/90/93/94
- Land Claims Act Amended: 1844
- Licensing Act Amended: 1844/51/54/1910/14/18/20/33/48/49/52/53/55/56/57/58/59/60/61/63/74/80/81
- Marriage Validation Act
- Municipal Corporations Act Amended: 1902/03/06/10/13/14/15/21/23/28/38/48/50/51/53/56/57/58/59/60/61/62/63/64/66/68/69/70/71/72/74/75/76/77
- New South Wales Laws Repealed Act
- Postage Act
- Raupo Houses Ordinance
- Summary Proceedings Act Amended: 1844/1961/63/64/67/68/69/70/73/74/75/76/78/79/80/81/82/85/86/87/89/91/92/93/94/95/96/98/99/2000/03/04/06

=== 1844 ===
- Appropriation Act
- Debentures Act
- Dog Nuisance Act
- German Settlers Naturalization Act
- Imprisonment for Debt Act
- Land Claimants Estates Act
- Native Exemption Act
- Native Trust Act
- Property Rate Act Repealed: 1845
- Supreme Court Rules Act
- Union Bank of Australia Act
- Unsworn Testimony Act

Plus nine acts amended and one act repealed.

=== 1845 ===
- Arms Importation Act
- Crown Grants Act Amended: 1867/70/1955/65/72/79
- English Acts Act
- Fines for Assaults Act
- Militia Act
- Naturalization Act
- New Munster Ordinances Act
- Public Roads and Works Act
- Supplementary Appropriation Act

Plus one act repealed.

=== 1846 ===
- Arms Act Amended: 1921/30/34/62/64/66/68/71/74/76/85/87/89/92/99/2000
- Constabulary Act
- Coroners Act Amended: 1908/20/30/45/54/56/59/70/76/96/2003/04
- Destitute Persons Act Amended: 1915/26/30/51/53/55/63
- Fees on Crown Grants Act
- Lunatics Act
- Native Land Purchase Act
- Prisons Act Amended: 1912/19
- Resident Magistrates Courts Act
- Sessions of the Peace Act
- Sheriffs Office Act
- Weights and Measures Act Amended: 1904/22/33/68/69/71/72/76/77/80/91/99/2000/01/05

Plus three acts amended and two acts repealed.

=== 1847 ===
- Debentures Security Act
- Education Act Amended: 1908/10/12/13/15/19/20/21/24/26/32/36/38/47/48/49/50/52/53/54/55/57/58/59/60/61/62/63/64/65/66/67/68/69/70/71/72/74/75/76/77/78/79/81/82/83/85/86/87/89/90/91/92/93/94/96/98/99/2000/06/07
- Fencing Act Amended: 1922/53/55/79
- Footpaths Act
- Gunpowder Act
- Impounding Act Amended: 1908/63/68/80
- Indemnity Act
- Marriage Act Amended: 1851/1912/15/19/20/26/27/29/33/46/51/59/66/70/76/78/82/85/86/91/93/94/99/2005
- Native Force Act
- Paper Currency Act Amended: 1851
- Registration Act (New Zealand)
- Sales of Spirits to Natives Act
- Savings Banks Act
- Slaughter-Houses Act
- Thomas Walker Nene's Annuity Act

=== 1848 ===
- Provincial Councils Act

Plus one act amended

=== 1849 ===
- Constabulary Force Act
- Country Roads Act
- Crown Lands Act Amended: 1851
- Crown Titles Act
- Empowering Act
- Entire Animal Act
- Medical Practitioners Act Amended: 1924/49/51/54/57/62/64/67/70/72/73/77/78/79/80/82/83/86/87/94/99
- Pensions Act Amended: 1914/24/25/32/36/37
- Scab Act
- Summary Ejectment Act
- Town Roads and Streets Act

== 1850s ==
=== 1851 ===
- Bank Charters Act Amended: 1853
- Building and Land Societies Act Amended: 1865/69
- Census Act
- Debtors Writ of Arrest Act
- Duties of Customs Act
- Interpretation Act Amended: 2005
- Land Fund Appropriation Act
- Municipal Elective Franchise Act
- New Zealand Company's Land Claimants Act

Plus six acts amended

=== 1853 ===
- Supreme Court Practitioners Act

=== 1854 ===
- Dower Act
- Law Practitioners Act Amended: 1913/15/20/21/29/30/35/52/53/57/61/62/63/64/65/67/68/69/70/74/75/76/81/85/87/88/91/93/94/95/99
- Nelson Trust Funds Act Amended: 1856/63
- Powers of Attorney Act
- Provincial Waste Lands Act
- Public Reserves Act Amended: 1862
- Secondary Punishment Act
- Waste Lands Act

Plus two acts amended

=== 1856 ===
- Auckland Hospital and Grammar School Reserves Act
- Bank Paper Currency Act
- Bills of Sale Registration Act Amended: 1862
- Counties Act Amended: 1908/10/13/15/19/21/25/27/29/31/34/49/52/54/55/56/57/58/59/60/61/62/63/64/65/66/67/68/69/70/71/72/74/75/76/77
- Customs Duties Act Amended: 1900/09
- Friendly Societies Act Amended: 1911/14/15/22/48/49/53/54/57/59/61/62/63/64/68/70/72/73/75/77
- Governor's Salary Act
- Land Claims Settlement Act
- Land Orders and Scrip Act
- Local Posts Act
- Magistrates Indemnity Act
- Nelson Wesleyan Chapel Sale Act
- New Zealand Colonial Bank of Issue Winding-Up Act
- New Zealand Debenture Act
- New Zealand Loan Act
- New Zealand Native Reserves Act
- Privileges Act
- Provincial Laws Act
- Public Offices Act
- Religious Charitable and Educational Trusts Act
- Resident Magistrates' Courts Extension of Jurisdiction Act
- Scotch Law Practitioners Act
- Superintendents Deputy Act
- Supreme Court Procedure Act
- The Provincial Councils Powers Act

Plus six acts amended

=== 1858 ===
- Absent Debtors Act
- Absent Defendants Act
- Appropriation Act 1858 No 1 Act
- Appropriation Act 1858 No 2 Act
- Auckland Improvement Act Amended: 1875
- Auckland Reserves Act
- Auckland Roman Catholic Endowments Sales Act
- Audit Act
- Australasian Creditors Act
- Bankers' Draft Act
- Bankers' Returns Act
- Bay of Islands Settlement Act
- Bishop of New Zealand's Trusts Act
- Boundaries of Provinces Act
- Canterbury Association Land Orders Act
- Civil List Act Amended: 1915/36/54/55/57/61/64/65/70/71/72/73/75/77/83/85/87
- Civil Service Superannuation Act
- Corrupt Practices Prevention Act Amended: 1895
- Crown Costs Act
- Crown Grants Correction Act
- Definition of Districts Act
- Disqualification Act
- District Courts Act Amended: 1979/80/81/82/83/85/86/87/88/89/91/92/94/95/96/98/99/2001/02/03/04/05/06/07
- Election Petitions Act
- Electoral Districts Act
- English Laws Act
- Execution of Criminals Act
- Foreign Seamen's Act
- Gaolers Act
- Gold Duty Act Amended: 1909/12
- Gold Fields Act
- Highways and Watercourses Diversion Act
- Interpretation 001 Act
- Interpretation 002 Act
- Justices of the Peace Act 1858 Amended: 1908/10/12/23/26/46/48/52/55/2007
- Land Claims Settlement Extension Act
- Land Revenue Appropriation Act
- Martin's Annuity Act
- Merchant Shipping Act
- Native Circuit Courts Act Amended: 1862
- Native Districts Regulation Act Amended: 1862
- Native Schools Act
- Native Territorial Rights Act
- Nelson College Act Amended: 1954
- Nelson College Trust Act
- New Provinces Act
- Ordinary Revenue Act
- Pensioner Villages Sale of Reserves Act
- Petty Sessions Act
- Post Office Act Amended: 1960/61/62/63/64/65/66/67/68/69/70/71/72/73/74/75/77/78/80/81/82/83/85
- Provincial Elections Act
- Provincial Lawsuits Act
- Provincial Reserved Bills Act
- Public Debt Apportionment Act
- Qualification of Electors Act
- Registration of Electors Act
- Regulation of Elections Act Amended: 1863
- Resident Magistrates' Courts Act
- Sheriffs Act
- Special Partnerships Act
- Supreme Court Judges Act
- Surplus Revenues Act
- The Elections Writs Act
- The Law Practitioners' Act
- The Province of Taranaki Act
- Unstamped Instruments Act
- Wool and Oil Securities Act

Plus five acts amended

== 1860s ==
=== 1860 ===
- Anderson Pipe Patent Act
- Auckland Harbour Debenture Act
- Auckland Waterworks Act
- Barristers and Solicitors Admission Act
- Foreign Seamen Act
- Fraudulent Trustees Act
- Half-caste Disability Removal Act
- Joint Stock Companies Act Amended: 1869
- Land for compensation Nelson and Marlborough Act
- Land Registry Act Amended: 1861
- Loan Expenditure Confirmation Act
- Lyttelton and Christchurch Railway Act
- Married Women's Property Protection Act
- Miners' Franchise Act
- Native Council Act
- Naval and Military Settlers Act
- Nelson and Marlborough Public Debt Apportionment Act
- Nelson Rowan Catholic Endowments Sale Act
- Nelson Wesleyan Schoolmaster's Land Sale Act
- Official Documents Evidence Act
- Patents Act 1860 Amended: 1972/76/92/94/96/99/2002
- Private Bills Evidence Act
- Public Domains Act
- Purchas and Ninnis Flax Patent Act
- Real Estate Administration Act
- Remission of Penalties Act
- Representation Act
- Summary Proceedings Improvement Act
- Taranaki Settlers' Relief Act
- The Indemnity Act
- Trade and Commerce Act
- Wellington Hawke's Bay and Taranaki Land Regulations Act

Plus seven acts amended

=== 1861 ===
- Advances to Agents Act
- Arms Act Continuance Act
- Auckland Immigration Certificate Act
- Auckland Representation Act
- Balneavis Remission Act
- Bank of New South Wales Act Amended: 1951
- Bank of New Zealand Act Amended: 1986/89
- Canterbury and Otago Boundary Act
- Canterbury and Otago Boundary Act No 2 Act
- Commissioners Powers Act
- Diseased Cattle Act
- Dun Mountain Railway Act
- Hawke's Bay Naval and Military Settlers Act
- Intestate Natives Succession Act
- Lost Land Orders Act
- Naval and Military Settlers' Marlborough Act
- Official Administrators Act
- Otago and Southland Public Debt Apportionment Act
- Parliamentary Costs Taxation Act
- Pensioners Claims Act
- Picton Railway Act
- Protection of certain Animals Act
- Provincial Audit Act
- Standing Orders for Private Bills Act
- Survey Correction Act

Plus 16 acts amended

=== 1862 ===
- Birds Protection Act
- Colonial Defence Force Act
- Commencement of Acts Act
- Court of Appeal Act
- Crown Grants No 1 Act
- Debtors and Creditors Act
- Marine Boards Act
- Military Supplies Customs Act
- Miner's Representation Act
- Native Lands Act
- Native Purposes Appropriation Act
- Panama Route Act
- Resident Magistrates' Jurisdiction Extension Act
- Steam Navigation Act
- Summary Procedure on Bills Act
- The Crown Grants Act No 2 1862 Act
- The Delegations Continuance Act
- The Sale for Non-payment for Rates Act
- Trustees' Relief Act

Plus 13 acts amended

=== 1863 ===
- Auckland And Drury Railway Act
- Bank of Otago Limited Act
- Bluff Harbour and Invercargill Railway and Extension Act
- Enquiry into Wrecks Act
- Foreign Offenders Apprehension Act
- Lands Clauses Consolidation Act
- Loan Appropriation Act
- Nelson College Trust Lands Act
- Nelson Waste Lands Act
- New Zealand Settlements Act Amended: 1865
- Otago Waste Lands No 1 Act
- Otago Waste Lands No 2 Act
- Provincial Compulsory Land Taking Act
- Provincial Councils Powers Extension Act
- Southland Waste Lands Act Amended: 1867
- Stewart's Island Annexation Act
- Superintendents Incorporation Act
- Suppression of Rebellion Act
- Tikokino Reserve Act
- Vaccination Act
- Wellington and Hawke's Bay Naval and Military Settlers Act
- Wellington Patent Slip Act

Plus 14 acts amended and one act repealed.

=== 1864 ===
- Albert Hall Act
- Bank of Auckland Act
- Canterbury Great Northern Railway Act
- Canterbury Great Southern Railway Act
- Canterbury Waste Lands Act
- Coupons Act
- Dunedin Water Works Act
- New Customs Duties Act
- Panama Mail Service Act
- Public Works Lands Act
- The Arms Act Continuance Act
- The Fourth Session of the Third Parliament of New Zealand Act
- The Rate of Interest Act
- The Registration of Deeds Validation Act Otago 1864 Act
- The Wild Birds' Protection Act

Plus six acts amended

=== 1865 ===
- Bailors of Sheep and Cattle Protection Act
- British Companies Act
- Comptroller's Act
- Crown Lands Nelson Leasing Act
- Duck's Nest Dam Act
- Electric Telegraph Act
- Hawke's Bay Military and Colonial Defence Corps Settlement Act
- Injuries by Dogs Act
- Intestate Estates Act Amended: 1870
- Leases and Sales of Settled Estates Act
- Lincoln Road Mill Dam Act
- Loan Allocation Act
- Lost Licenses and Leases Act
- Maori Funds Investment Act
- Master and Apprentice Act Amended: 1920/24
- Mining Companies Limited Liability Act
- Native Commission Act
- Native Rights Act
- New Plymouth Exchanges Commission Act Amended: 1866
- Otago Municipal Corporations Empowering Act
- Otago Public Offices Site Trusts Act
- Outlying Districts Police Act
- Picton and Blenheim Railway Act
- Post Office Savings Banks Act Amended: 1869
- Protection of Certain Animals Act
- Railway Offences Act
- Southland Provincial Debt Act
- The Armitage Pension Act
- The Commencement of Acts Act
- The Howard's Pension Act
- The Legislative Council Quorum Act
- The Mayne Pension Act
- The New Provinces Act
- The Nixon Pension Act
- The Prisoners' Removal Act
- The Private Estates Bills Act
- The Provincial Constabulary Act
- The Provincial Corporations Act
- The Provincial Lawsuits Act Declaratory Act
- The Provisional Jury List Act
- The Taranaki Naval and Military Settlers' Act
- The Volunteers' Land Act
- The West Coast Gold Field Provincial Representation Act
- Volunteer Force Act
- Wellington Hospital Reserves Act
- Wellington Supreme Court House Site Act

Plus 17 acts amended

=== 1866 ===
- Adulteration of Food Act
- Aliens Act Amended: 1957/65/67
- Attorney-General's Act
- Auckland Waste Lands Act Amended: 1862/63
- Carriers Act Amended: 1962
- Civil Service Act Amended: 1861/1908
- Criminal Law Procedure Act
- Crown Debts Act
- Crown Lands Sales Extortion Prevention Act
- Customs Tariff Act
- District Courts Jurisdiction Extension Act
- Duty on Bonded Warehouses Act
- East Coast Land Titles Investigation Act
- Friendly Natives' Contracts Confirmation Act
- Indictable Offences Trials Act
- Innkeepers' Liability Act
- Justices Protection Act
- Loan Expenditure Indemnity Act
- Marine Act
- Military Pensions Act Amended: 1903
- Nelson Cobden and Westport Railway Land Act
- Offences Against the Person Act
- Otago Southern Trunk Railway Act Amended: 1867
- Otago Waste Lands Act
- Oyster Fisheries Act
- Presbyterian Church of Otago Lands Act
- Sale of Poisons Act Amended: 1900
- Stamp Duties Act Amended: 1908/09/10/13/24/25/26/27/31/52/53/55/56/57/58/60/61/63/64/65/66/67/68
- The Affirmations in lieu of Oaths in Criminal Proceedings Act
- The Appropriation Act
- The Gold Fields Members Qualification Act
- The Loan Appropriation Act
- The Newcastle Crown Grants Validation Act
- The Privileges Act
- The Superintendents' Election Disallowance Signification Act
- The Supreme Court Judges Act
- The Treasury Bills Act
- The Williams Compensation Act
- Trade Marks Act Amended: 1972/76/85/87/90/94/96/99/2003/05
- Treasury Bills Regulation Act
- Vagrant Act
- Wellington Land Purchase Loan Sanction Act
- Wellington Loan Sanction Act

Plus 22 acts amended and two acts repealed.

=== 1867 ===
- Accessories Act
- Appeals from Justices Act
- Armed Constabulary Act
- Auckland and Drury Railway Act
- Auckland and Onehunga Native Hostelries Act
- Bankruptcy Act Amended: 1927/55/56/60
- Bills of Sale Act
- British-Australasian Mail Services Act
- Coinage Offences Act
- Confiscated Lands Act
- County of Westland Act Amended: 1869
- Divorce and Matrimonial Causes Act Amended: 1912/13/19/20/21/30/53/58
- Execution of Judgments against Real Estate Act
- Forgery Act
- Governor's Delegations Act
- Introduction of Convicts Prevention Act
- John Jones Land Claims Settlement Act
- Land Claims Arbitration Act
- Larceny Act
- Malicious Injuries to Property Act
- Maori Real Estate Management Act
- Maori Representation Act
- Marlborough Waste Lands Act
- Naval and Victualling Stores Act
- Neglected and Criminal Children Act
- New Zealand Institute Act Amended: 1920/30
- Offences against the Person Act
- Old Metal and Marine Store Dealers Act
- Presbyterian Church Land Sale Act
- Private Estates Bills Act
- Protection of Animals Act
- Provident and Industrial Societies Act
- Public Buildings Reserves Act
- Public Debts Act
- Public Offenders Disqualification Act
- Public Revenues Act Amended: 1912/13/14/15/52/56/57/58/60/62/63/64/65/66/67/68/69/70/71/72/73/74/75/76
- Public Stores Act
- Salmon and Trout Act
- Supplementary Electoral Rolls Revision Act
- Surplus Revenue Adjustment Act
- Taranaki Naval and Military Settlers Act
- Tauranga District Lands Act
- The Auckland Waste Lands Act
- The Bartley Pension Act
- The Canterbury Public Reserves Act
- The Commissioners Powers Act
- The Consolidated Loan Act
- The Diseased Sheep Fines Appropriation Act
- The Governor's Salary Act
- The Hokitika Greymouth and Okarita Town Lands Act
- The Imprest Supply Act
- The Legislative Officers Salaries Act
- The Otago Gold Fields Judicial Officers Act
- The Provincial Acts Validation Act
- The Resident Magistrates' Act
- Timaru and Gladstone Board of Works Act Amended: 1870
- Wairarapa Racecourse Exchange Act
- Waste Lands Boards Appeal Act
- Westland Representation Act Amended: 1868

Plus 23 acts amended and two acts repealed.

=== 1868 ===
- Bishop of New Zealand Trusts Act
- Canterbury and Westland Public Debt Apportionment Act
- Canterbury Rivers Act
- Colonial Forces Courts-Martial Act
- Companies Act Amended: 1902/10/19/20/21/22/23/28/52/59/60/63/64/65/66/67/69/70/71/73/75/76/77/78/80/81/82/83/85/86/87/88/89/90/93/98/99/2004/06/07
- Confiscated Land Revenue Appropriation Act
- Consolidated Loan Provincial Charges Act
- Courts of Law Trust Moneys Act
- Deeds Registration Act Amended: 1863
- Distress and Replevin Act Amended: 1913/36/50/67/2004
- East Coast Act
- Electric Telegraph Reserves Release Act
- Escheat Act
- Gold Mining Claims Drainage Act
- Government House Site Act
- Green and Spencer Land Claims Act
- Hawke's Bay and Marlborough Rivers Act
- Immigration Act Amended: 1965/66/68/69/76/77/78/79/80/88/89/90/91/92/93/96/99/2002/03/04/06
- Mortgages of Stock Registration Act
- Nelson and Cobden Railway Act
- Ngaitahu Reference Validation Act
- Otago Education Reserves Abandonment Act
- Otago Surveys Correction Act
- Printers and Newspapers Registration Act
- Provincial Acts Validation Act Continuance Act
- Provincial Appropriations Validation Act
- Public Debts Sinking Funds Act
- Public Domains Acts Extension Act
- Resident Magistrates Act
- Russell Military Grant Act
- The Bridges and Ferries Act
- The Conveyancing Charges Act
- The Interest on Money Act
- The Marlborough Reserve Leasing Act
- The Mete Kingi Paetahi Election Act
- The Otago Road Boards Endowment Act
- The Pawnbrokers Act
- The Public Houses Act
- The Treason-Felony Act
- The Trigonometrical Stations and Survey Marks Act
- Treasury Bills Act
- University Endowment Act
- Wellington and Hawke's Bay Public Debt Apportionment Act
- Williamson Compensation Act

Plus 20 acts amended

=== 1869 ===
- Acclimatization Society of Southland Grant Act
- Auckland Gold Fields Proclamations Validation Act
- Bailments of Stock and Chattels Registration Act
- Botanic Garden Act
- Canterbury Temporary Mining Reserves Act
- Commissioners of Crown Lands Act
- Consolidated Loan Application Act
- Contagious Diseases Act
- Crown Bonds and Securities Act
- Dangerous Goods Act Amended: 1963/64/67/75/78/79/83/89
- Delivery of Goods and Lien for Freight Act
- Disturbed Districts Act
- Gaolers and Prisoners Act
- Gold Fields Officers' Salaries Act
- Government Annuities Act 1869
- Greymouth Quays Act
- Medical Practitioners' Registration Act
- Merchant Shipping Acts Adoption Act
- Military Contribution Act
- New Zealand Commissioners Act
- New Zealand Cross Endowment Act
- New Zealand Law Society's Act
- Oamaru Town Reserves Management Act
- Otago Hundreds Regulation Act
- Otago Settlements Act
- Provincial Acts Validation Continuance Act
- Public Libraries Act
- Public Payments without Probate Act
- Railways Act
- Restriction on Marine Re-assurance Removal Act
- Shortland Beach Act
- The Hugo Max Bucholz Naturalization Act
- The Nelson Marriages Act
- The Poverty Bay Grants Act
- The Provincial Councils Legislation Appeal Act
- The Wellington and Hawke's Bay Public Debt Apportionment Acts Exte Act
- Trustees' Powers Delegation Act
- Walsh and Others Pension Act
- Whiteley Pension Act

Plus 26 acts amended

== 1870s ==
=== 1870 ===
- Agricultural Produce Lien Act
- Christchurch Gas Act Amended: 1971
- Colonial Reciprocity Act
- Deceased Persons Estates Act
- Defence and other Purposes Loan Act
- Deputy Superintendent of Wellington Act
- District Courts Criminal Jurisdiction Extension Act
- Fire Inspectors Act
- Gisborne Land Act
- Gold Duties Act
- Government Officers Guarantee Act
- Government Summary Prosecutions Act
- Green Land Claims Settlement Act
- Harbour Boards Act
- Hawke's Bay Crown Lands Sale Act
- Hawke's Bay Renewal of Licenses Act
- Immigration and Public Works Act
- Immigration and Public Works Loan Act
- Kaiapoi Native Industrial School Grant Act
- Land Transfer Act Amended: 1902/13/25/39/50/58/59/60/61/63/66/72/82/85/86/91/93/94/95/97/2005
- Limited Liability Companies Winding-up Act
- Marlborough Sale of Reserves Act
- Merchant Ships Officers Examination Act
- Meredith and Others Pension Act
- Mohaka and Waikare District Act
- Native Lands Frauds Prevention Act
- New Zealand and Australian Submarine Telegraph Act
- New Zealand Government Insurance and Annuities Act
- New Zealand University Act Amended: 1912/14/15/19/23/26/28/29/30/50/53/54/56/57/58/59/60
- Otago and Southland Union Act
- Outlying Districts Sale of Spirits Act
- Partition Act
- Patents Act 1870
- Payments to Provinces Act
- Punishment of High Treason Act
- Qualifications of Electors Act
- Resident Magistrates Evidence Act
- Richmond Land Sales Act
- Sale for Non-Payment of Rates Act
- Sales by Mortgagees Act
- South Sea Islands Drawbacks Act
- Temporary Loan Act
- The Aliens Act
- The Canterbury Gauge Act
- The Johnston Land Grant Act
- The Provincial Reserved Bills Act
- The Treasury Bills Extended Currency Act
- The Wellington and Hawke's Bay Public Debt Apportionment Act Exten Act
- Turner's Land Grant Act
- Unincorporated Boards Suits Act
- Vexatious Indictments Act
- Wairarapa Town Lands Management Act
- Wairau Valley Road Act
- Wellington Gas Company Act
- Wellington Waste Lands Act Amended: 1865
- Westland Waste Lands Act

Plus 27 acts amended

=== 1871 ===
- Appeals from Provincial Rating Act
- Auckland Burial-Ground Act
- Auckland Gas Company Act Amended: 1963/68/69
- Auckland Harbour Docks Act
- Auckland Military Reserves Act
- Auckland Mineral Leases Act
- Bakers and Millers Act
- Bishops in New Zealand Trusts Act
- Branigan Allowance Act
- Carrington Land Grant Act
- Charitable Funds Appropriation Act
- Church Lands Building Leases Act
- City of Christchurch Loan Act
- City of Dunedin Borrowing Act
- Coasting Trade Regulation Act
- Contractors Debts Act
- Convicts Forfeitures Act
- Crown Redress Act
- Dunedin and Port Chalmers Railway Act
- East Coast District Land Titles Validation Act
- Forest Trees Planting Encouragement Act
- Gold Mines Drainage Act
- Gold Mining Districts Act
- Highway Boards Act
- Invercargill Public Gardens Reserves Alienation Act
- Kukutai Grant Validation Act
- Lundon and Whitaker Claims Act
- Masterton and Greytown Lands Management Act
- Native Districts Road Boards Act
- Naturalization Act 1870 Fees Act
- Nelson City Gas Act
- Nelson City Loan Act
- Otago Supreme Court Offices Act
- Prisoners Maintenance Expenses Act
- Sharebrokers Act Amended: 1952/57/67/81/88/94/96
- Taranaki Education Reserves Act
- The Juries Act
- The Otago Settlements Act
- Wellington City Reserves Act
- Wellington Debts Act
- Wellington Education Reserves Act
- Wellington Reclaimed Land Act
- Wellington Special Settlements Act
- Wellington Waterworks Act

Plus 27 acts amended

=== 1872 ===
- Auckland Mechanics Institute Site Sale Act
- Auckland Temperance Hall Site Sale Act
- Borough of Wanganui Borrowing Act
- Canterbury Public Domains Act
- Canterbury Ratepayers' Rolls Revision Act
- Church of England Lands Buildings Lease Act
- Coromandal Tunnel Company Act
- Drawbacks Act
- Dunedin Gas and Water Works Loan Act
- Government Contractors Arbitration Act
- Greymouth Harbour Works Advance Validation Act
- Hawke's Bay Native Lands Alienation Commission Act
- Hawke's Bay Special Settlements Act
- Imprest Supply Act
- Limited Liability Joint Stock Companies Dissolution Act
- Lyttelton Harbour Works Loan Act
- Miners' Rights Extension Act
- Mining Companies Act
- Municipal Corporations Waterworks Act
- Newmarket Reserve Disposal Act
- North Dunedin Cemetery Act
- North Otago District Public Works Loan Act
- Oamaru Dock Trust Land Act
- Otago Dock Trust Debt Act
- Public Health Act Amended: 1901/02/03/04/10/15/18/19
- Public Trust Office Act Amended: 1905/07/12/13/17/19/21/48/51/56/67/68/71/72/75/77/78/82/83/86/90/94
- Quartz-Crushing Machines Regulation and Inspection Act
- Schafer, McGuire, and Others Pension Act
- Superintendents of Marlborough Election Act
- Taranaki New Zealand Company's Land Claims Act
- Telegraph Service of Notices Act
- The Auckland Waterworks Act
- The Clerk of Parliaments Act
- The Gold Duties Act
- The Highway Boards Empowering Act
- The Nelson Special Settlements Act
- The Payments to Provinces Act
- The Public Revenues Act
- The Tramways Act 1872 Amended: 1910/11/13/15/20/30/59/69/73/76/78/79/88
- Wanganui Bridge and Wharf Act
- Wanganui Hospital Act
- Wardens' Courts Proceedings Validation Act
- Wellington College Act

Plus 25 acts amended

=== 1873 ===
- Assaults on Constables Act
- Auckland Supreme Court Site Act
- Bank Holidays Act
- Broughton Land Grant Act
- Canterbury Public Library Act
- Christchurch Cathedral Square Act
- Employment of Females Act
- General Purposes Loan Act
- Governor's Salary and Allowances Act
- Green Island Branch Railway Act
- Harata Patene Claim Rehearing Act
- Heni Tareha Matangi Grant Validation Act
- Imbecile Passengers Act
- Immigrants Land Act
- Life Assurance Companies Act
- Ministerial Residence Lease and Lowry Bay Sale Act
- Native Grantees Act
- Native Land Act Amended: 1912/13/14/15/16/17/18/19/20/21/22/23/24/25/26/27/28/29/30/32/36
- Native Land Duties Act
- Native Reserves Act Amended: 1858/62
- Neglected Children's Act
- New Zealand Extradition Act
- Otago Hundreds Proclamations Validation Act
- Promissory Oaths Act
- Province of Westland Act
- Queenstown Reserves Act
- Railways Regulation and Inspection Act
- Rangitikei-Manawatu Crown Grants Act
- Resumption of Land for Mining Purposes Act
- Stewart Island Grants Act Amended: 1876
- Superintendents of Hawke's Bay Election Act
- Telegraph Cables Subsidy Agreement Ratification Act
- Thames Gas Company's Act
- The Port Chalmers Waterworks Act
- The Superintendent of Taranaki Empowering Act
- Timber Floating Act
- Township of Geraldine Act
- Wanganui River Foreshore Grant Act
- Washdyke and Pleasant Point Railway Act
- Wellington College Loan Act
- Wellington College Vote in Aid Act
- Wellington Drainage and Sewerage Works Loan Act
- Wellington Harbour Reserves Mortgage Release Act
- Westland Loan Act

Plus 24 acts amended

=== 1874 ===
- Auckland Harbour Act
- Borough of Thames Tramways Act
- Burial-Ground Closing Act
- Canterbury Marriages Act
- Canterbury Water Supply Act
- City of Christchurch Drainage Debentures Act
- City of Dunedin Gasworks Act
- Clutha River Trust Reserves Act
- Colonial Bank of New Zealand Act
- Constitution of the Westport Borough Proceedings Validation Act
- Cromwell Waterworks Act
- Dunedin Waterworks Act
- Excise Duties Act
- Government Insurance and Annuities Act
- Harbour Works Act
- Hokitika Mayors Act
- Imprisonment for Debt Abolition Act
- Inspection of Machinery Act Amended: 1894/1908/10/14/27/31
- Invercargill Gas Loan Act
- Lyttelton Gas Act
- Municipal Reserves Act
- Napier Harbour Board Act Amended: 1887/89/99/1912
- Naval Training Schools Act
- New Plymouth Exchanges Completion Act
- New Zealand Forests Act
- Oamaru Harbour Board Land Act
- Oamaru Hospital Reserves Act
- Otago Reserves Act
- Otago Waste Lands Administration Act
- Outlying Districts Sale of Spirits Act 1870 Orders in Council Validation Act
- Poverty Bay Lands Titles Act
- Provincial Fencing Laws Empowering Act
- Provincial Public Works Advances Act
- Real Estate Descent Act
- Regulation of Mines Act
- Taimaro and Waimahana Grants Act
- Taranaki Iron Smelting Works Lands Act
- Taranaki Waste Lands Act
- The David Lewis Retiring Allowance Act
- The New Plymouth Harbour Board Endowment Act
- The Otago Provincial Public Works Advances Act
- The Wilson Gray Pension Act
- Wanganui Mayors Act
- Wellington Hospital Loan Act
- Wellington Land Payments Act
- Wellington Mayors Act
- Wellington Waterworks Loan Act
- Whakataki Grants Act

Plus 29 acts amended

=== 1875 ===
- Abolition of Provinces Act
- Anatomy Act
- Anne Hood Grant Act
- Auckland City Endowments and Reserves Act Amended: 2001
- Auckland Harbour Foreshore Grant Act
- Auckland Institute Act
- Campbelltown Athenaeum Act
- Christchurch District Drainage Act Amended: 1911/14/20/22/23/24/26/27/28/31/32/35/44/48/54/57/60/66/67/69/70/71/75/79/85
- Chubbin Land Purchase Act
- Clutha River Conservators Board Act
- Clyde Waterworks Empowering Act
- Commissioners of the Supreme Court Act
- Davides Succession Act
- Dunedin Corporation Borrowing Powers Extension and Debentures Act
- Dunedin Waterworks Extension Act Repealed: 1978
- Fraudulent Debtors Act
- Government Apprentices Act
- Greytown and Masterton Public Park and Cemetery Reserve Act
- Immigration and Public Works Appropriation Act
- Immigration Expenditure Indemnity Act
- Invercargill Municipal Council Empowering and Waterworks Loan Act
- Invercargill Public Offices Site Act
- Kaitangata Railway and Coal Company Limited Empowering Act
- Lodgers Franchise Act
- Martin Grant Act
- Moeraki Harbour Board Act
- Napier Gas Company Act Amended: 1936
- Napier Municipal Council Empowering and Waterworks Loan Act
- Napier Swamp Nuisance Act
- New River Harbour Board Land Act
- New Zealand Presbyterian Church Act
- New Zealand University Reserves Act
- Oamaru Gasworks Act
- Oamaru Town Hall and Gasworks Sites Recreation Reserves Act
- Oamaru Waterworks Act
- Onehunga Reserves Act
- Otago Harbour Board Empowering Act
- Otago University Site Exchange Act
- Outram Electric Telegraph Station Reserve Act
- Palmerston Waterworks Act
- Plans of Towns Regulation Act
- Presbyterian Church of Otago Corporation Act
- Provincial Appropriations Extension Act
- Public Libraries Powers Act
- Queenstown Waterworks Act
- Railway Companies Act
- Registration of Births and Deaths Act Amended: 1892
- Registration of Mining Companies Validation Act
- Riddell Grant Act
- Stamp Act
- Stamp Fee Act
- The Kakanui Harbour Board Act
- The New Zealand Presbyterian Church Act
- The Wellington Reclaimed Land Act
- Timaru Municipal Council Waterworks Loan Act
- University of Otago Site Act
- Wellington Athenaeum and Mechanics Institute Incorporation Act
- Wellington Rivers Act
- Wellington Toll Gates Act
- Westport Municipal Reserve Act

Plus 32 acts amended

=== 1876 ===
- Animals Importation Prohibition Act
- Auckland Beach Road Grants Act
- Auckland Public Buildings Act
- Blueskin Athenaeum Reserve Act
- Blueskin Recreation Reserve Act
- Bluff Harbour Board Act
- Building Societies Act Amended: 1856/1951/55/70/78/80/82/83/87/89/93/2004/07
- Canterbury Educational Reserves Sale and Leasing Act
- Canterbury New Brighton Bridge Act
- Castlepoint Harbour Board Act
- City of Wellington Loans Consolidation Act
- Cromwell Racecourse Reserve Act
- Diseased Sheep Act
- Douglas Special Settlement Act
- Dunedin Drill-shed Reserve Act
- Dunedin Reserves Exchange Act
- Dunedin Wharves and Quays Reserves Act
- Education Boards Act
- Ellesmere and Forsyth Reclamation and Akaroa Railway Trust Act
- Executive Councillors Indemnity Act
- Financial Arrangements Act
- Foxton Harbour Board Act Amended: 1917
- Hawke's Bay Rivers Act Amended: 1912/17/20/30/32/33/34/36
- Hokitika Harbour Board Act
- Intestate Native Succession Act
- Lawrence Athenaeum and Mining Institute Reserve Act
- Lawrence Recreation Reserve Act
- Lyttelton Harbour Board Act
- Lyttelton Public Reserves Vesting Act
- Milton Athenaeum Reserve Act
- Milton Municipality Extension Act
- Moa Flat School Reserve Act
- Napier Athenaeum and Mechanics' Institute Incorporation Act
- Napier Borough Endowments Act Amended: 1999
- Napier Hospital Site Act
- Naseby Waterworks Act
- Oamaru Harbour Board Act
- Ohinemuri Gold Field Agricultural Leases Validation Act
- Otago and Wellington Tolls Act
- Otago Harbour Board Act
- Otago Presbyterian Church Conveyance Validation Act
- Otepopo Athenaeum and Public Library Reserve Act
- Patea Harbour Board Act
- Port Molyneux Reserves Leasing Act
- Public Works Act Amended: 1901/04/05/08/09/10/11/13/14/23/24/25/27/28/35/47/48/52/53/54/55/56/58/60/61/62/63/64/65/67/70/71/72/73/74/75/76/77/82/83/87/88/91
- Queenstown Commonage Reserve Management Act
- Rabbit Nuisance Act Amended: 1918/20/21/35/47/49/52/53
- Rating Act Amended: 1910/11/13/15/22/24/35/50/54/57/60/62/65/69/70/72/73/74/76/77/78/80/81
- Regulation of Local Elections Act
- Renwick Lease and Conveyance Act
- Roman Catholic Lands Act
- Roxburgh Reserves Act
- South Dunedin and St Kilda Municipalities Validation Act
- Taranaki Botanic Garden Act
- Thames Harbour Board Act
- Thames Water Supply Act
- The Imprest Supply Act No 2 1876 Act
- The Maori Representation Acts Continuance Act
- Timaru Gas Act
- Timaru Harbour Board Act Amended: 1906
- Waimakariri Harbour Board Act
- Waitahuna Athenaeum Act
- Waitara Harbour Board Act
- Waiuku Church of England Site Crown Grant Act
- Waiuku Native Grants Act
- Wanganui Harbour and River Conservators Board Act
- Warehoused Goods Act
- Waste Lands Administration Act
- Wellington Corporate Land Act
- Wellington Hospital and College Reserves Exchange Act
- Wellington Reserves Act

Plus 14 acts amended

=== 1877 ===
- Agricultural and Pastoral Societies Act Amended: 1903/12/20/33/61/73/77/79/93
- Akaroa Public Library Site Act
- Auckland College and Grammar School Act
- Auckland Highway Districts Validation Act
- Balculutha Athenaeum Act
- Bankers' Books Evidence Act
- Bluff Harbour Endowment and Borrowing Act
- Borough of New Plymouth Reserves Act
- Cemeteries Management Act
- Christchurch City Reserves Act Amended: 1929/32
- Church Trust Property at Little River Exchange Act
- City of Dunedin Loans Consolidation Act
- Clyde Public Reserves Grant Act
- Cromwell Athenaeum Reserves Act
- Crown Lands Sale Act
- District Railways Act Amended: 1920/88
- Domicile Act
- Dunedin Gaol Street Act
- Dunedin Gas and Waterworks Act
- Dunedin School Reserve Act
- Dunedin Town Hall Site Act
- Education Reserves Act Amended: 1910/11/13/14/15/24/27/31/34/48
- Fine Arts Copyright Act
- Fish Protection Act
- Government Native Land Purchases Act
- Greenwood Pension Act
- Havelock Athenaeum and Mechanics' Institute Incorporation Act
- Havelock Commonage Act
- Himatangi Crown Grants Act
- Hokanui Education Reserve Act
- Hokitika Gas Company Act
- Hutt County Offices Site Act
- Industrial and Provident Societies Act Amended: 1919/23/52/57/64/65/67/73/77/79/81/83/93/94/2003/07
- Jackson's Bay Road District Act
- Kaiapoi Cemetery Act
- Kaiapoi Native Reserves Act
- Land Act 1877 Amended: 1950/51/52/53/54/56/58/59/60/61/62/63/64/65/67/68/70/71/72/74/75/77/79/81/82/84/98
- Lawrence Athenaeum and Mining Institute Act
- Lawrence Municipal Waterworks Act
- Lawrence Reserves Act
- Lyttelton and Heathcote Recreation Ground Act
- Lyttelton Harbour Board Land Act
- Lyttelton Harbour Works Compensation Act
- Lyttelton Public Domain Act
- Manawatu Land Orders Act
- Mataura Reserve Act
- Middle Island Half-Caste Crown Grants Act
- Mines Act
- Mount Cook Road District Act
- Napier Swamp Nuisance Act Continuance Act
- Nelson Gas and Waterworks Sale Act
- New River Harbour Management Act
- New Zealand Consolidated Stock Act
- Oamaru Athenaeum and Mechanics' Institute Reserves Act
- Onehunga Endowments Act
- Otago Boys' and Girls High Schools Act
- Otago Museum Act
- Peninsula County Libraries Act
- Ponsonby Highway District Act
- Port Chalmers Compensation Act
- Port Chalmers Mechanics' Institute Incorporation and Reserves Act
- Provincial Laws Evidence Act
- Public Libraries Subsidies Act
- Public Reserves Sale Act
- Queenstown Athenaeum Act
- Sale of Food and Drugs Act Amended: 1915/24
- Shipping and Seamen Act Amended: 1909/10/11/12/13/22/24/25/29/36/46/48/50/54/56/57/59/61/62/63/64/65/66/67/68/69/70/71/72/75/76/77/82/85/87/88/90/91
- Slaughterhouses Act
- Southland Agricultural and Pastoral Association Reserve Act
- Southland Boys' and Girls' High Schools Act Amended: 1951/71
- Special Contracts Confirmation Act
- Tapanui Agricultural and Pastoral Exhibition Reserve Act
- Taranaki County Reserves Act
- Timaru and Gladstone Board of Works Property Vesting Act
- Timaru Mechanics' Institute Act
- Tokomairiro Farmers' Club Reserve Act
- Volunteers and Others Lands Act
- Waikato Hospital Reserves Exchange Act
- Waikouaiti Athenaeum Land Act
- Waiwera School Glebe Sale Act
- Wakapuaka Telegraph Station Site Act
- Wanganui Gas Company Act
- Wanganui Harbour Endowment and Borrowing Act
- Waste Lands Boards Continuance Act
- West Harbour Mayoralty Election Validation Act
- Westland and Nelson Coal Fields Administration Act Amended: 1881
- Whangarei Port Act
- Wyndham Recreation Reserve Act Amended: 1915/23

Plus 41 acts amended

=== 1878 ===
- Administration Act Amended: 1911/35/44/51/57/58/60/64/65/67/70/73/75/79/81/82/85/87/93/94/98/2001/03/05
- Ashburton High School Act
- Auckland Girls' High School Act
- Bluff Harbour Endowment Act
- Borough of Christchurch Reserves Act
- Christchurch Boys High School Act
- Christchurch Racecourse Reserve Act
- Cruelty to Animals Act
- District Law Societies Act
- Foxton Reserves Act
- Greymouth Racecourse Reserve Act
- Hamilton Volunteer Hall Site Act
- Hokitika Harbour Board Endowment Act
- Inch Clutha Act
- Incorporation of Campbelltown Act
- Invercargill Water Works Loan Act
- Land Tax Act Amended: 1977/78/81/82/83/85/86/88/89
- Lyttelton Waterworks Transfer Act Amended: 1979
- Malvern Water-race Transfer Act
- Milford Harbour Board Act
- Milton Athenaeum Endowment Act
- Mount Cook Reserve Sale Act
- Mount Ida Water-race Trust Act
- Native Licensing Act
- Nelson Harbour Board Act Amended: 1901/02
- New Plymouth High School Act Amended: 1966/70
- New River Harbour Endowment and Borrowing Act
- Newmarket Reserve Act
- Norsewood Mechanics' Institute Site Act
- North Otago Benevolent Society Act
- Oamaru Athenaeum and Mechanics' Institute Act
- Oamaru Market Reserve Act
- Ormond Military Grants Act
- Otago and Southland Education Reserves Leasing Act
- Otago School Commissioners Empowering Act
- Otago University Act
- Parnell Reserve Act
- Patea Harbour Act Amended: 1919
- Patumahoe Hall Site Act
- Railways Construction Act
- Repeals Act
- Reprint of Statutes Act
- Riverton Harbour Endowment and Borrowing Act
- Savings Bank Profits Act
- Seals Fisheries Protection Act
- Sheep Act
- Special Powers and Contracts Act
- Taranaki County Council Loan Act
- Temporary Powers Act
- Thames Boys' and Girls' High School Act Amended: 1960/63
- The Catlin's River Cemetery Act
- Timaru Harbour Board Endowment Act
- Timaru High School Act Amended: 1958
- Timaru Post and Telegraph Offices Site Sale Act
- Trade Union Act
- Waikato Crown Lands Sale Act
- Wairoa Harbour Board Act
- Waitaki High School Act Amended: 1954/63
- Wanganui High School Act
- Wellington City Boundaries Act
- Wellington College Reserves Confirmation Act
- Wellington Local Boards Empowering Act
- Whakatane Grants Validation Act
- Whangarei High School Act Amended: 1959/66
- Wyndham Cemetery Act

Plus 30 acts amended

=== 1879 ===
- Alexandra Corporation Reserve Act
- Ashburton County Council Waterworks Act
- Auckland Free Public Library Aid Act
- Auckland Harbour Board Act
- Auckland Improvement Commissioners' Transfer of Powers Act
- Awatere Shearing Reserve Act
- Christchurch Drill-shed Act
- City of Auckland Loans Consolidation Act
- Confiscated Lands Inquiry and Maori Prisoners' Trials Act
- District Courts Proceedings Validation Act
- Elections Validation Act
- Intercolonial Probate Act
- Kaitangata and Wangaloa Athenaeums Reserves Act
- Kumara Education Reserve Act
- Maori Prisoners' Trials Act
- Marlborough River Districts Union Act
- New River Pilot Station Reserve Act
- Onehunga Water Reserves Act
- Onewhero Grant Empowering Act
- Oreti Bridge and Ferry Reserves Act
- Otago University Reserve Leasing Act
- Property Assessment Act
- Property Tax Act
- Queenstown Racecourse Reserve Act
- Revision of Statutes Act
- Riverton Drill-shed Reserve Management Act
- Sites for Working-men's Clubs Act
- The Bluff Harbour Foreshore Endowment Act
- The Imbecile Passengers Act Extension Act
- The Land-Tax Collection Act
- The Oamaru Harbour Board Act
- The Palmerston North Reserves Act
- The Timaru Harbour Board Empowering Act
- The Triennial Parliaments Act
- Timaru Waterworks Act
- Tobacco Act Amended: 1910
- Wairarapa Racecourse Act
- Waitara Harbour Board Land and Borrowing Act
- Waiuku Recreation Reserve Act
- Wanganui Bridge Debentures Act
- Wellington Harbour Board Act
- Wellington Provincial District Highway Boards Act
- West Clive Public Hall Site Act

Plus 25 acts amended and one act repealed.

== 1880s ==
=== 1880 ===
- Adulteration Prevention Act
- Animals Protection Act Amended: 1903/10/20/62/64/71/78/83/87/93
- Banks and Bankers Act
- Beer Duty Act Amended: 1913
- Bills of Exchange Procedure Act
- Bluff Harbour Foreshore Leasing Act
- Brands and Branding Act
- Caversham Boroughs Incorporation Act
- Chattel Securities Act
- Deaths by Accidents Compensation Act Amended: 1950/56/64/2005
- Deceased Wife's Sister Marriage Act
- Dentists Act Amended: 1910/11/21/26
- Diseased Cattle Proclamations Validations Act
- Dog Registration Act
- Execution against Real Estate Act
- High School Reserves Act
- Hokitika Harbour Board Loan Act
- Invercargill Drill-Shed Site Act
- Jackson's Bay Settlement Act
- Lodgers' Goods Protection Act
- Maori Prisoners Act
- Maori Prisoners Detention Act
- Mercantile Law Act Amended: 1922/94
- Native Land Court Act
- Native Schools Sites Act
- Otago Road Rates Validity Act
- Permanent Officers' Salaries Act
- Pharmacy Act Amended: 1912/22/54/57/59/62/65/68/73/75/77/79/82/85/94/99
- Proclamations Validation Act
- Sydenham Borough Council Empowering Act
- Taonui-Ahuaturanga Land Act
- Thames Water Supply Transfer Act
- Waikato Confiscated Lands Act
- Wanganui Harbour and River Conservators Board Grant Act
- Wellington Harbour Board and Corporation Land Act

Plus 21 acts amended

=== 1881 ===
- Adoption of Children Act
- Akaroa High School Act
- Auckland Reserves Exchange and Change of trust Act
- Chatham Islands Act
- Chinese Immigrants Act Amended: 1907
- Crown Suits Act Amended: 1910
- Customs and Excise Duties Act
- Deceased Persons' Estate Duties Act
- Drainage Act
- Employment of Females and Others Act
- Gaming and Lotteries Act Amended: 1979/80/81/82/83/87/88/89/91/92/94/96/2000
- Geraldine Race-course Reserve Act
- Hororata Water-race Act
- Invercargill Gasworks Site Act
- Native Succession Act
- Otago University Reserves Vesting Act
- Port Chalmers Cemetery Act
- Port Chalmers Dock Trust Act
- Port Chalmers Drill-Shed Act
- Property-Tax Act
- Railways Authorization Act
- Railways Construction and Land Act Amended: 1913
- Rangiora High School Act Amended: 1960/63
- Roxburgh Recreation-ground Management Act
- Thermal-Springs Districts Act
- Timaru Harbour Board Loan Act Amended: 1937
- Timaru Water-Race Reserve Act
- Town Districts Act
- Volunteer Act
- Waimakariri Harbour Board Loan Act
- Waimate and Temuka Public Schools Sites Act
- Waimate Race-course Reserve Act
- Waitara Harbour Board Loan Act
- Wellington Queen's Wharf and Store Sales Act
- West Coast Settlement Reserves Act Amended: 1913/14/15/23/48

Plus 27 acts amended

=== 1882 ===
- Amnesty Act
- Ashburton County Council Empowering Act
- Ashburton Racecourse Reserve Act
- Auckland Harbour Board Empowering Act Amended: 1973
- Auckland Museum Endowment Act
- Auckland Railway-station Act
- Auckland University College Act Amended: 1912/23/47
- Bluff Harbour Foreshore Reclamation Act
- Borough of Hamilton Boundaries Act
- Cemeteries Act Amended: 1912/22/26/50/53/59
- Criminal Law Act
- Crown and Native Lands Rating Act
- Customs Duties Consolidation Act
- Customs Laws Consolidation Act
- Dunedin Southern Market Reserve Leasing Act
- Education Districts Act
- Employers' Liability Act
- Explosives Act Amended: 1958/62/73/75/78/83/89/2000
- Gas Companies' and Consumers' Liability Act
- Gisborne Harbour Board Act Amended: 1903/20
- Industrial Schools Act Amended: 1909
- Mining Companies Registration Validation Act
- Napier High School Act Amended: 1916/60
- Native Land Division Act
- New Zealand Colonial Inscribed Stock Loan Act
- North Island Main Trunk Railway Loan Act
- North Timaru Cemetery Sale Act
- Oamaru Harbour Board Loan Act
- Ohoka and Eyreton Domain Board Empowering Act
- Orakei Native Reserve Act
- Otago Harbour Board Further Empowering Act
- Patea Harbour Land Act
- Portobello Road Board Enabling Act
- Private and Local Bills Costs Act
- Private Tramways Act Amended: 1891
- Protection of Telegrams Act
- Rangiora Domain Board Empowering Act
- Rangipo-Murimotu Agreement Validation Act
- Reserves and Endowments in Mining Districts Act
- Rhodes Estate Duty Act
- Road Boards Act Amended: 1914/21
- Roads and Bridges Construction Act
- Small Birds Nuisance Act
- Te Aroha Township Act
- Tea Examination Act
- Thorndon Reclamation Act
- Trustees, Executors and Agency Company Act
- West Coast Peace Preservation Act

Plus 34 acts amended

=== 1883 ===
- Auckland Hospital Reserves Act
- Bills of Exchange Act Amended: 1963/71/79/95/2002
- Caversham, South Dunedin and St Kilda Streets Improvement Act
- Charitable Gifts Duties Exemption Act
- City of Auckland Additional Loan Act
- Confederation and Annexation Act
- Criminals Executions Act
- Fugitive Offenders Jurisdiction Act
- Gisborne Courts Proceedings Validation Act
- Greymouth High School Act
- Guardian, Trust, and Executors Company Act Amended: 1911
- Hokitika High School Act
- Industrial Societies Act Amended: 1926/63/87
- Inspection of Machinery Extension Act
- Invercargill Reserves Exchange Act
- Kawhia Township Sale Act
- Land Boards Inquiry Act
- Massey Frauds Indemnity Act
- Middle Island Half-caste Grants Act
- Murihiku Native Reserves Grants Act
- Native Committees Act
- New River Harbour Endowments Act
- Otago Dock Act
- Parliamentary Witnesses Indemnity Act
- Patents Act 1883
- Property Law Consolidation Act
- South Island Native Reserves Act
- St Johns College Auckland Removal Act
- Taiaroa Land Act
- Taumutu Native Commonage Act
- Timaru Racecourse Reserve Act
- Trustee Act Amended: 1901/14/24/33/35/46/55/57/60/62/68/69/74/77/82/83/86/88/2005
- Waimate High School Act
- Wanganui Bridge Act
- Wellington College Land Act
- Wellington Harbour Board Land and Reclamation Act
- West Coast Peace Preservation Act 1882 Continuance Act
- Westland Education District Subdivision Act

Plus 30 acts amended

=== 1884 ===
- Affirmations in lieu of Oaths Extension Act
- Beet-root Sugar Act
- Caversham Drainage Act
- Chatham Islands Animals Act
- City of Dunedin Leasing Powers Act
- Codlin Moth Act
- Consolidated Stock Act
- Drainage of Mines Act
- Electric Lines Act
- False Notice of Birth, Marriage, and Death Act
- Fisheries Conservation Act
- Foreign Companies Act
- Gisborne Gas Company Act
- Gisborne Harbour Act Amended: 1910
- Greymouth Harbour Board Act Amended: 1920/35/45/48/62
- Hokitika Racecourse Reserve Act
- Hokitika Steam Tug Act
- Invercargill Reserves Leasing Act
- Kaiapoi Domain Board Empowering Act
- Kowai Domain Board Empowering Act
- Life Assurance Policies Act
- Married Women's Property Act Amended: 1961
- Napier Harbour Board Empowering and Loan Act Amended: 1920
- Native Land Alienation Restriction Act
- New Zealand Government Insurance Association Act
- Otago Harbour Board Loans Consolidation Act
- Parliamentary Honorarium and Privileges Act
- Perpetual Trustees, Estate, and Agency Company Act Amended: 1971
- Police Offences Act Amended: 1901/03/04/06/13/19/24/26/35/50/51/52/53/54/55/56/58/60/65/67/69/70/74/76/79
- Registration of Births Extension Act
- Religious, Charitable, and Educational Trust Boards Incorporation Act
- River Boards Act Amended: 1910/13/14/17/34/52/56/58/68/71/74/75/76/78/80/88
- Statutes of New Zealand Private Acts Deemed to be Public Acts
- Tauranga School Site Act
- Thames Recreation Reserve Sale Act
- Timaru Market Reserve Act
- Timber-floating Act
- Wellington Harbour Board Loans Consolidation and Empowering Act
- West Harbour Borough Empowering Act
- Westport Harbour Board Act
- Workmen's Wages Act

Plus 31 acts amended and one act repealed.

=== 1885 ===
- Auckland Railway Land Compensation Act
- Auckland University College Reserves Act Amended: 1928
- Borough of Invercargill Loans Consolidation Act
- Canterbury and Otago Marriages Act
- Christ's College, Canterbury Act
- Christchurch Market Reserves Act
- Christchurch Public Works Loan Validation Act
- Congregational Union Incorporation Act
- Costley Training Institution Act Amended: 1975/79
- Customs Duties Interpretation Act
- Distress Act
- District Railways Purchasing Act
- Dunedin Cattle-market Reserve Leasing Act
- Enforcement of Judgments Act
- Fisheries Encouragement Act
- Gisborne High School Act Amended: 1909/56/63/66
- Hospitals and Charitable Institutions Act Amended: 1910/13/15/19/20/23/25/28/29/32/36/47
- Local Bodies Contractors Act
- Local Bodies Finance and Powers Act
- Mortgage Debentures Act
- Napier Harbour Board Empowering Act
- New Zealand State Forests Act
- Otago Harbour Board Leasing Act
- Palmerston North Burgess Roll Act
- Presbyterian Church Property Act Amended: 1930/61/63/70/74/96
- Rabbit Nuisance Act 1882 Continuance Act
- Resident Magistrates' Courts Proceeding Validation Act
- St Mary's Convent Property Leases Act
- Sydenham Public Works Loan Validation Act
- Waimea Plains Railway Rating Act
- Wellington Corporation Leaseholds Act
- Wellington Public Street-closing Act
- Westland and Grey Education Boards Act
- Whitmore Enabling Act

Plus 35 acts amended

=== 1886 ===
- Administration Act Extension Act
- Apportionment Act
- Auckland Harbour Board Loan Act
- Borough of Mornington Boundaries Act
- Cathedral-site, Parnell, Leasing Act
- Charitable Trusts Extension Act
- City of Christchurch Municipal Offices Act
- City of Dunedin Leasing Act
- Civil Service Reform Act
- Coal Mines Act Amended: 1950/53/59/60/61/64/68/70/71/72/74/80/82/83/85/86/87/88
- Companies' Branch Registers Act
- Deeds and Instruments Registration Act
- Defence Act 1886 Amended: 1908/10/12/14/15/31/73/74/76/80/82/85/86/87/88/92/97/98/99/2000/01/03/04/05/07
- First Offenders' Probation Act Amended: 1903
- Fish Auction Act
- Gisborne Public Prison Act
- Government Life Insurance Act Amended: 1912/48/51/54/59/62/64/67/68/70/72/77/82
- Government Loans to Local Bodies Act Amended: 1900
- Hakateramea Racecourse Reserve Act
- Hutt and Petone Gas Company Act
- Local Bodies' Loans Act Amended: 1902/03/08/10/12/21/22/24/51/55
- Lost Debentures Act
- Mining Act Amended: 1910/11/13/14/15/19/20/22/24/27/31/34/35/37/41/47/48/53/60/61/62/63/65/72/73/75/78/81/85/87
- Native Equitable Owners Act
- Native Land Administration Act
- Native Reserves' Titles Grant Empowering Act
- New Zealand Bible, Tract, and Book Society Act
- North Island Main Trunk Railway Loan Application Act Amended: 1891
- North Timaru Cemetery Sale or Exchange Act
- One-Tree Hill Reserve Act
- Otago Harbour Bridge Act
- Owhaoko and Kaimanawa-Oruamatua Reinvestigation of Title Act
- Police Force Act Amended: 1919/24/51/52/54/55/56
- Port Chalmers Fire-brigade Site Act
- Property-tax Act
- Public Bodies' Leaseholds Act
- Public Works Appropriation Act
- Railways Authorization and Management Act
- Settled Land Act Amended: 1915/22
- Waimate Racecourse Trustees Empowering Act
- Wellington and Manawatu Railway Company's Additional Capital and Debentures Val Act
- Wellington and Wanganui Education Districts Act
- Wellington Harbour Board Leasing Act
- Wyndham Show-ground Reserve Act

Plus 23 acts amended

=== 1887 ===
- Akaroa Borough Council Reserves Vesting and Reclamation Act
- Australasian Naval Defence Act
- Cambridge and Hastings Boroughs Act
- Christchurch Drainage Board Reserves Sale and Exchange Act
- Christchurch Hospital Act Amended: 1928/44/79
- Government Railways Act Amended: 1910/11/12/13/19/20/21/22/24/25/27/28/31/32/36/44/50/52/53/54/55/56/57/59/61/62/63/64/67/68/71/72/73/74/76/78/80
- Hammond Fencing-Claims Compensation Act
- Infants Guardianship and Contracts Act
- Invercargill Waterworks Reserve Act
- Kermadec Islands Act
- Midland Railway Contract Act
- Ministers' Salaries and Allowances Act Amended: 1900
- New Plymouth Borough and Harbour Board Street and Reserve Exchange Act
- New Plymouth Recreation and Racecourse Reserve Act Amended: 1910/20/42
- Order in Council Validation Act
- Phoenix Assurance Company of London Act
- Public Bodies' Powers Act
- Pukekohe Borough Act
- Reclamation within the Harbour of Wellington Act
- Sounds County Hospital Representation Act
- Tamaki West Licensing District Act
- Wairarapa North County Council Empowering Act
- Ward Conservation of Rights Act
- Wellington College and Girls' High School Act
- Wesleyan Methodist Church Property Trust Act
- Westland and Grey Education Boards Act Continuance Act
- Westland and Nelson Native Reserves Act

Plus 11 acts amended

=== 1888 ===
- New Zealand Loan Act 1887 Repeal
- Auckland Harbour Improvement Act
- Christchurch Rifle-range Act
- Clyde Domain and Recreation-ground Grant Act
- Demise of the Crown Act
- Ellesmere Lake Lands Act
- Invercargill Corporation Empowering Act
- Kaiapoi Drill-shed Act
- Local Bodies Audit Act
- Local Courts Proceedings Act
- MacKenzie Land Act
- Mokau-Mohakatino Act
- Mount Somers Road Board Empowering Act
- Native Contracts and Promises Act
- Naval and Military Forces Discipline Act
- Naval and Military Settlers' and Volunteers' Land Act
- Nelson Hospital Reserves Act
- Ngaruawahia Cemetery Reserve Leasing Act
- Oamaru Municipal and Education Reserves Exchange Act
- Opawa Education Reserve Act
- Otago Harbour Board Indemnity and Lands Vesting Act
- Penalties Recovery and Remission Act
- Puhoi Settlers Act
- Ross Compensation Act
- Volunteer Drill-sheds and Lands Act
- Waikato Agricultural College Model Farm Act
- Wellington Asylum, Home, Hospital, and Orphanage Reserves Act
- Wellington Corporation and College Land Exchange Act
- Whangarei Drill-shed Act

Plus 16 acts amended and 1 act repealed.

=== 1889 ===
- Borough of Brunner Enabling Act
- Canterbury Society of Arts Reserve Act
- Patents Designs and Trade-marks Act

Most of the links below don't work. We can fix them based on the list of 1889 Acts

- Canterbury Society of Arts Reserve Act 1889 Extension
- Certificates of Title Issue Empowering Act
- Chattels Transfer Act Amended: 1922/23/25/31/50/52/53/61/63/67/69/70/73/74/85/90/96
- Criminal Evidence Act
- Educational Endowments Act
- Fire and Marine Insurance Companies Act
- Geraldine Public School Site Act
- Hawera Borough Endowment Act
- Imprest Supply No 2 Act
- Imprest Supply No 3 Act
- Karamu Reserve Act
- Kumara Sludge-channel Act
- Masterton Trust Lands Act Amended: 1930/35/80
- Napier High School Board Leases Validation Act
- Napier Odd Fellows Lodge Site Act
- Naval and Military Settlers and Volunteers Land Act
- Nelson Foreshore Reserve Act
- Ngarara and Waipiro Further Investigation Act
- Orimakatea Title Empowering Act
- Otago Marriages Act
- Poututu Jurisdiction Act
- Requisitions Validation Act
- Riverton Corporation Empowering Act
- Selectors Lands Revaluation Act
- Timaru Harbour Board Land Act
- Triennial Licensing Committees Act
- Waimate Public Library Act
- Waimate Public Reserve Sale Act
- Waimea Riverworks Act
- Waipa Order in Council Validation Act
- Waitohi River Bed Act
- Wellington and Manawatu Railway Companys Drainage Empowering Act
- Wellington City Empowering Act
- Wi Pere Land Act

Plus 15 acts amended

== See also ==
The above list may not be current and will contain errors and omissions. For more accurate information try:

- Walter Monro Wilson, The Practical Statutes of New Zealand, Auckland: Wayte and Batger 1867
- The Knowledge Basket: Legislation NZ
- New Zealand Legislation Includes some imperial and provincial acts. Only includes acts currently in force, and as amended.
- Legislation Direct List of statutes from 2003 to order
- Early Statutes of New Zealand
