= Post Office Act =

Stock short title used for legislation

Post Office Act (with their variations) is a stock short title initially used in the United Kingdom and later in the United States and other English speaking countries, for legislation relating to the post office.

== List ==
=== Bahamas ===
- Post Office Act 1914

=== Bermuda ===
- Post Office Act 1900

=== Canada ===
- Post Office Act 1867

=== India ===
- Indian Post Office Act 1898
- Indian Post Office (Amendment) Bill, 2002
- Post Office Act, 2023

=== Ireland ===
- Post Office Act, 1908, Adaptation Order, 1932
- Post Office (Amendment) Act 1951
- Post Office (Amendment) Act 1969
- Postal and Telecommunications Services Act, 1983

=== Isle of Man ===
- Isle of Man Post Office Authority Act 1972
- Isle of Man Post Office Authority (Postal Services Etc.) Act 1973
- Post Office Act 1993

=== Jamaica ===
- Post Office Act 1941

=== Malaysia ===
- Post Office Act 1947
- Post Office Savings Bank Act 1948

=== South Africa ===
- Post Office Act 1958
- Post Office Amendment Act, 1991
- South African Post Office Act 2011

=== United Kingdom ===
- The Post Office Act 1660 (12 Cha. 2. c. 35)
- The Post Office (Revenues) Act 1710 (9 Ann. c. 11)
- The New General Post Office, Edinburgh, Act 1858 (21 & 22 Vict. c. 40)
- The South-western (of London) District Post Office Act 1880 (43 & 44 Vict. c. xciv)
- The Post Office and Telegraph Act 1897 (60 & 61 Vict. c. 41)
- The Post Office (Guarantee) Act 1898 (61 & 62 Vict. c. 18)
- The Post Office Guarantee (No. 2) Act 1898 (61 & 62 Vict. c. 59)
- The Post Office (Money Orders) Act 1903 (3 Edw. 7. c. 12)
- The Post Office Act 1904 (4 Edw. 7. c. 14)
- The Post Office (Money Orders) Act 1906 (6 Edw. 7. c. 4)
- The Post Office (Literature for the Blind) Act 1906 (6 Edw. 7. c. 22)
- The Post Office Act 1908 (8 Edw. 7. c. 48)
- The Post Office Act 1913 (3 & 4 Geo. 5. c. 11)
- The Post Office and Telegraph Act 1920 (10 & 11 Geo. 5. c. 40)
- The Post Office (Pneumatic Tubes Acquisition) Act 1922 (12 & 13 Geo. 5 c. 43)
- The Post Office (Parcels) Act 1922 (12 & 13 Geo. 5. c. 49)
- The Post Office (Amendment) Act 1935 (25 & 26 Geo. 5. c. 15)
- The Post Office (Amendment) Act 1952 (15 & 16 Geo. 6 & 1 Eliz. 2. c. 36)
- The Post Office Act 1953 (1 & 2 Eliz. 2. c. 36)
- The Post Office Savings Bank Act 1954 (2 & 3 Eliz. 2. c. 62)
- The Post Office Act 1961 (9 & 10 Eliz. 2. c. 15)
- The Post Office Savings Bank Act 1966 (c. 12)
- The Post Office (Borrowing Powers) Act 1967 (c. 15)
- The Post Office (Data Processing Service) Act 1967 (c. 62)
- The Post Office Act 1969 (c. 48)
- The Post Office (Banking Services) Act 1976 (c. 10)
- The Postal Services Act 2000 (c. 26)
- The Postal Services Act 2011 (c. 5)
- The Post Office (Horizon System) Compensation Act 2024 (c. 1)
- The Post Office (Horizon System) Offences (Scotland) Act 2024 (asp 6)
- The Post Office (Horizon System) Offences Act 2024 (c. 14)

The Post Office Acts 1837 to 1895 was the collective title of the following acts:

- The Post Office (Repeal of Laws) Act 1837 (7 Will. 4 & 1 Vict. c. 32)
- The Post Office Management Act 1837 (7 Will. 4 & 1 Vict. c. 33)
- The Post Office (Offences) Act 1837 (7 Will. 4 & 1 Vict. c. 36)
- The Post Office (Duties) Act 1840 (3 & 4 Vict. c. 96)
- The Post Office (Duties) Act 1844 (7 & 8 Vict. c. 49)
- The Post Office (Duties) Act 1847 (10 & 11 Vict. c. 85)
- The Post Office (Money Orders) Act 1848 (11 & 12 Vict. c. 88)
- The Colonial Inland Post Office Act 1849 (12 & 13 Vict. c. 66)
- The Post Office (Duties) Act 1860 (23 & 24 Vict. c. 65)
- The Post Office Lands Act 1863 (26 & 27 Vict. c. 43)
- The Post Office (Postmaster-General) Act 1866 (29 & 30 Vict. c. 55)
- The Telegraph Act 1868 (31 & 32 Vict. c. 110)
- The Telegraph Act 1869 (32 & 33 Vict. c. 73)
- The Post Office Act 1870 (33 & 34 Vict. c. 79)
- The Post Office Act 1875 (38 & 39 Vict. c. 22)
- The Post Office (Money Orders) Act 1880 (43 & 44 Vict. c. 33)
- The Post Office Newspaper Act 1881 (44 & 45 Vict. c. 19)
- The Post Office (Land) Act 1881 (44 & 45 Vict. c. 20)
- The Post Office (Reply Post Cards) Act 1882 (45 & 46 Vict. c. 2)
- The Post Office (Parcels) Act 1882 (45 & 46 Vict. c. 74)
- The Post Office (Money Orders) Act 1883 (46 & 47 Vict. c. 58)
- The Post Office (Protection) Act 1884 (47 & 48 Vict. c. 76)
- The Telegraph Act 1885 (48 & 49 Vict. c. 58)
- The Telegraph (Isle of Man) Act 1889 (52 & 53 Vict. c. 34)
- The Post Office Act 1891 (54 & 55 Vict. c. 46)
- The Post Office Act 1892 (55 & 56 Vict. c. 24)
- The Post Office Amendment Act 1895 (58 & 59 Vict. c. 18)

The Post Office (Duties) Acts 1840 to 1891 is the collective title of the following acts:

- The Post Office (Duties) Act 1840 (3 & 4 Vict. c. 96)
- The Post Office (Duties) Act 1844 (7 & 8 Vict. c. 49)
- The Post Office (Duties) Act 1847 (10 & 11 Vict. c. 85)
- The Post Office (Reply Post Cards) Act 1882 (45 & 46 Vict. c. 2)
- The Post Office Act 1891 (54 & 55 Vict. c. 46)
- The Post Office (Duties) Act 1860 (23 & 24 Vict. c. 65)
- The Post Office Act 1870 (33 & 34 Vict. c. 79)
- The Post Office Act 1875 (38 & 39 Vict. c. 22)

The Post Office (Management) Acts 1837 to 1884 was the collective title of the following acts:

- The Post Office Management Act 1837 (7 Will. 4 & 1 Vict. c. 33)
- The Post Office (Offences) Act 1837 (7 Will. 4 & 1 Vict. c. 36)
- The Colonial Inland Post Office Act 1849 (12 & 13 Vict. c. 66)
- The Post Office Lands Act 1863 (26 & 27 Vict. c. 43)
- The Post Office (Land) Act 1881 (44 & 45 Vict. c. 20)
- The Post Office (Protection) Act 1884 (47 & 48 Vict. c. 76)

The Post Office (Money Orders) Acts 1848 to 1883 is the collective title of the following Acts:

- The Post Office (Money Orders) Act 1848 (11 & 12 Vict. c. 88)
- The Post Office (Money Orders) Act 1880 (43 & 44 Vict. c. 33)
- The Post Office (Money Orders) Act 1883 (46 & 47 Vict. c. 58)

The Post Office (Offences) Acts 1837 to 1884 is the collective title of the following Acts:

- The Post Office (Offences) Act 1837 (7 Will. 4 & 1 Vict. c. 36)
- The Post Office (Protection) Act 1884 (47 & 48 Vict. c. 76)

The Post Office Savings Bank Acts 1861 to 1893 is the collective title of the following acts:

- The Post Office Savings Bank Act 1861 (24 & 25 Vict. c. 14)
  - And the enactments applied by that act which are for the time being in force
- The Post Office Savings Bank Act 1863 (26 & 27 Vict. c. 14)
- The Post Office Savings Bank Act 1874 (37 & 38 Vict. c. 73)
- The Savings Banks Act 1880 (43 & 44 Vict. c 36), so far as it relates to Post Office Savings Banks
- Parts I and III of the Savings Banks Act 1887 (50 & 51 Vict. c. 40)
- So much of the Savings Banks Act 1891 (54 & 55 Vict. c. 21), as relates to the Post Office Savings Bank
- The Savings Banks Act 1893 (56 & 57 Vict. c. 69)

=== United States ===
- Postal Service Act of 1792
- Post Office Act of 1872
- Comstock Act of 1873
- Postal Reorganization Act of 1970

== See also ==
- List of short titles
