= Post Office (Newspapers) Act 1836 =

Act of the Parliament of the United Kingdom

- Act of Parliament
- Parliament of the United Kingdom
- Long title: An Act to consolidate and amend the Laws relating to the Conveyance of Newspapers by the Post.
- Citation: 6 & 7 Will. 4. c. 54
- Territorial extent: United Kingdom

Dates
- Royal assent: 13 August 1836
- Commencement: 13 August 1836 (Note: The Acts of Parliament (Commencement) Act 1793.)
- Repealed: 1 August 1837
Other legislation
Amends	See § Repealed enactments
Repeals/revokes	See § Repealed enactments
Repealed by	Post Office (Repeal of Laws) Act 1837

Status: Repealed

Text of statute as originally enacted

The Post Office (Newspapers) Act 1836 (6 & 7 Will. 4. c. 54) was an act of the Parliament of the United Kingdom that consolidated enactments related to the postage of newspapers in the United Kingdom.

== Provisions ==
=== Repealed enactments ===
Section 1 of the act repealed 11 enactments, listed in that section.

Citation	Short title	Description	Extent of repeal
4 Geo. 3. c. 24	Postage Act 1763	An Act passed in the Fourth Year of the Reign of King George the Third, intituled An Act for preventing Frauds and Abuses in relation to the sending and receiving of Letters and Packets free from the Duty of Postage.	As relates to the Conveyance of Newspapers by the Post.
9 Geo. 3. c. 35	Customs, etc. Act 1769	An Act passed in the Ninth Year of the Reign of King George the Third, intituled An Act for discontinuing upon the Exportation of Iron imported in Foreign Ships the Drawback of such Part of the Duties payable thereon as exceeds the Duties payable upon Iron imported in British Ships; to prohibit the Exportation of Pig and Bar Iron and certain Naval Stores unless the Pre-emption thereof be offered to the Commissioners of the Navy; to repeal so much of an Act made in the Sixth Year of His present Majesty's Reign as discontinued the Drawback upon Foreign rough Hemp exported; for providing a Compensation to the Clerks in the Office of the Principal Secretaries of State for the Advantages such Clerks enjoyed before the Commencement of an Act made in the Fourth Year of the Reign of His present Majesty, for preventing Frauds and Abuses in relation to the sending and receiving Letters and Packets free from the Duty of Postage, and to explain and amend the said Act..	As relates to the Conveyance of Newspapers by the Post.
24 Geo. 3. Sess. 1. c. 6	Postage (No. 2) Act 1783	An Act passed in the Twenty-fourth Year of the Reign of King George the Third, intituled An Act or establishing certain Regulations concerning the Postage and Conveyance of Letters and Packets by the Post between Great Britain and Ireland.	As relates to the Conveyance of Newspapers by the Post.
35 Geo. 3. c. 53	Postage Act 1795	An Act passed in the Thirty-fifth Year of the Reign of King George the Third, intituled An Act for further regulating the sending and receiving Letters free from the Duty of Postage; for allowing Non-commissioned Officers, Seamen, and private Men in the Navy and Army whilst on Service to send and receive Letters at a low Rate of Postage; and for permitting Pat- terns and Samples of Goods to be transmitted by the Post at an easier Rate than is now allowed by Law.	As relates to the Conveyance of Newspapers by the Post.
42 Geo. 3. c. 63	Postage Act 1802	An Act passed in the Forty-second Year of the Reign of King George the Third, intituled An Act to authorize the sending and receiving of Letters and Packets, Votes, Proceedings in Parliament, and printed Newspapers by the Post free from the Duty of Postage by the Members of the Two Houses in Parliament of the United Kingdom, and by certain Public Officers therein named, and for reducing the Postage on such Votes, Proceedings, and Newspapers when sent by any other Persons.	As relates to the Conveyance of Newspapers by the Post.
45 Geo. 3. c. 11	Postage Act 1805	An Act passed in the Forty-fifth Year of the Reign ofKing George the Third, intituled An Act for granting certain additional Rates and Duties in Great Britain on the Conveyance of additional Rates and Duties in Great Britain on the Conveyance of Letters.	As relates to the Conveyance of Newspapers by the Post.
59 Geo. 3. c. 111	Postage Act 1819	An Act passed in the Fifty-ninth Year of King George the Third, intituled An Act to repeal so much of an Act assed in the Fifty-fifth Year of His present Majesty as relates to the Postage and Conveyance of Letters to and from the Cape of GoodHope, Ceylon, the Mauritius, and the East Indies, and to make other Regulations respecting the Postage of such Letters and Packets, and other Letters and Packets sent by the Post.	As relates to the Conveyance of Newspapers by the Post.
6 Geo. 4. c. 68	Postage (No. 3) Act 1825	An Act passed in the Sixth Year of the Reign of His late Majesty King George the Fourth, intituled An Act to regulate the Convey nce ofprinted Votes and Proceedings in Parliament, and printed Newspapers, by Packet Boats between Great Britain and Ireland and the British Colonies, and also in the United Kingdom.	As relates to the Conveyance of Newspapers by the Post.
7 & 8 Geo. 4. c. 21	Postage (No. 2) Act 1827	An Act passed in the Seventh and Eighth Years of the Reign of King George the Fourth, intituled An Act to amend the Laws relating to the Duties of Postage in Great Britain and Ireland.	As relates to the Conveyance of Newspapers by the Post.
4 & 5 Will. 4. c. 44	Postage Act 1834	An Act passed in the Fourth and Fifth Years of the Reign of His present Majesty, intituled An Act to regulate the Conveyance of printed Newspapers by Post between the United Kingdom, the British Colonies, and Foreign Parts.	As relates to the Conveyance of Newspapers by the Post.
5 & 6 Will. 4. c. 25	Post Office Act 1835	An Act passed in the Fifth and Sixth Years of the Reign of His present Majesty, intituled An Act to extend the Accommodation by the Post to and from ForeignParts, andfor other Purposes relating to the Post Office.	As relates to the Conveyance of Newspapers by the Post.

== Subsequent developments ==
The whole act was repealed by section 1 of, and schedule A. to, the Post Office (Repeal of Laws) Act 1837 (7 Will. 4 & 1 Vict. c. 32), which came into force on 1 August 1837.
