= Post Office (Revenues) Act 1710 =

Act of the Parliament of Great Britain

Post Office (Revenues) Act 1710 (Note: The citation of this act by this short title was authorised by section 1 of, and the first schedule to, the Short Titles Act 1896. Due to the repeal of those provisions it is now authorised by section 19(2) of the Interpretation Act 1978.)
- Act of Parliament
- Parliament of Great Britain
- Long title: An Act for establishing a General Post Office for all Her Majesties Dominions, and for settling a weekly Sum out of the Revenues thereof for the Service of the War and other Her Majesties Occasions. (Note: These words are printed against this act in the second column of the first schedule to the Short Titles Act 1896, which is headed "Title".)
- Citation: 9 Ann. c. 11 (Note: This is the citation in The Statutes of the Realm); 9 Ann. c. 10 (Note: This is the citation in The Statutes at Large)
- Territorial extent: Great Britain

Dates
- Royal assent: 16 May 1711
- Commencement: 1 June 1711 (Note: Section 2.)
- Repealed: 1 May 1909

Other legislation
- Amends: Post Office Act 1660
- Repeals/revokes: Post Office Act 1695
- Amended by: Post Office Act 1748; Postage Act 1765; Post Office (Repeal of Laws) Act 1837; Revenue Officers' Disabilities Removal Act 1874
- Repealed by: Statute Law Revision Act 1871; Post Office Act 1908

Status: Repealed

Text of statute as originally enacted

The Post Office (Revenues) Act 1710 (9 Ann. c. 11) was an act of the Parliament of Great Britain, which established post offices in the colonies and allotted its weekly revenues for the ongoing war and other uses.

The act repealed the Post Office Act 1695 (c. 31 (S)), and united the post offices of England and Scotland under two Postmasters General of Great Britain.

== Subsequent developments ==
The whole act, "except so far as relates to the Payment and Appropriation of the weekly Sum of Seven hundred Pounds thereby directed to be paid into the Receipt of the Exchequer, and as relates to Her Majesty's Hereditary Revenue, and except all Annuities and other Payments and Incumbrances to which the Revenue of the Post Office is thereby made liable, and except so far as relates to the Interference with or Participation in Elections of Members of Parliament by Officers of the Post Office", was repealed by section 1 of, and schedule (A.) to, the Post Office (Repeal of Laws) Act 1837 (7 Will. 4 & 1 Vict. c. 32).

The whole act, except the last two sections, was repealed for England and Wales by section 1 of, and the schedule to, the Statute Law Revision Act 1871 (34 & 35 Vict. c. 116), which came into force on 21 August 1871.

Section 45 (section 91 in Ruffhead's Edition). was repealed by section 1 of, and the schedule to, the Revenue Officers' Disabilities Removal Act 1874 (37 & 38 Vict. c. 22).]

So much of the act as was unrepealed was repealed by section 92 of, and schedule 2 to, the Post Office Act 1908 (8 Edw. 7. c. 48), which came into force on 1 May 1909.

== See also ==
- Post Office Act
