= Post Office (Repeal of Laws) Act 1837 =

Act of the Parliament of the United Kingdom

Post Office (Repeal of Laws) Act 1837 (Note: The citation of this act by this short title was authorised by section 1 of, and the first schedule to, the Short Titles Act 1896. Due to the repeal of those provisions it is now authorised by section 19(2) of the Interpretation Act 1978.)
- Act of Parliament
- Parliament of the United Kingdom
- Long title: An Act to repeal the several Laws relating to the Post Office.
- Citation: 7 Will. 4 & 1 Vict. c. 32
- Territorial extent: United Kingdom

Dates
- Royal assent: 12 July 1837
- Commencement: 1 August 1837 (Note: Section 4.)
- Repealed: 1 May 1909
Other legislation
Amends	See § Repealed enactments
Repeals/revokes	See § Repealed enactments
Repealed by	Post Office Act 1908
Relates to	Post Office (Management) Act 1837; Postage Act 1837; Postage Act 1837; Post Office (Offences) Act 1837

Status: Repealed

Text of statute as originally enacted

The Post Office (Repeal of Laws) Act 1837 (7 Will. 4 & 1 Vict. c. 32) was an act of the Parliament of the United Kingdom that repealed enactments related to the Post Office of the United Kingdom.

== Provisions ==
=== Repealed enactments ===
Section 1 of the act repealed 99 enactments, listed in schedule A. to the act.

Citation	Short title	Description	Extent of repeal
September 1690 c. 3	Robbing the Packet Act 1690	An Act against robbing of the Packet.	The whole act.
9 Anne. c. 10	Post Office (Revenues) Act 1710	An Act for establishing a General Post Office for all Her Majesty's Dominions, and for settling a weekly Sum out of the Revenues thereof for the Service of the War, and other Her Majesty's Occasions.	The whole act, except so far as relates to the Payment and Appropriation of the weekly Sum of Seven hundred Pounds thereby directed to be paid into the Receipt of the Exchequer, and as relates to Her Majesty's Hereditary Revenue, and except all Annuities and other Payments and Incumbrances to which the Revenue of the Post Office is thereby made liable, and except so far as relates to the Interference with or Participation in Elections of Members of Parliament by Officers of the Post Office.
6 Geo. 1. c. 21	Excise Act 1719	An Act for preventing Frauds and Abuses in the Public Revenues of Excise, Customs, Stamp Duties, Post Office, and House Money.	So much as relates to the Post Office.
4 Geo. 2. c. 33	Postage Act 1730	An Act for obviating a Doubt which hath arisen concerning the usual Allowance made upon the Delivery of Letters sent by the Penny Post to Places out of the Cities of London and Westminster and Borough of Southwark, and the respective Suburbs thereof.	The whole act.
22 Geo. 2. c. 25	Post Office Act 1748	An Act to explain and amend so much of an Act made in the Ninth Year of the Reign of Queen Anne, intituled "An Act for establishing a General Post Office for all Her Majesty's Dominions, and for settling a weekly Sum out of the Revenues thereof for the Service of the War, and other Her Majesty's Occasions," as relates to Horses or Furniture to be let to Persons riding Post.	The whole act.
26 Geo. 2. c. 13	Tobacco Trade, etc. Act 1753	An Act for the more effectually preventing the fraudulent Removal of Tobacco by Land or Water, and for the Ease of the fair Trader in Tobacco; and for ascertaining the Rates payable for the Portage of certain Letters; and for amending and explaining the Laws relating to the Sale of Spirituous Liquors by Retail.	So much as relates to the Post Office.
4 Geo. 3. c. 24	Postage Act 1763	An Act for preventing Frauds and Abuses in relation to the sending and receiving of Letters and Packets free from the Duty of Postage.	The whole act.
5 Geo. 3. c. 25	Postage Act 1765	An Act to alter certain Rates of Postage, and to amend, explain, and enlarge several Provisions in an Act made in the Ninth Year of the Reign of Queen Anne and in other Acts relating to the Revenue of the Post Office.	The whole act, except so much thereof as relates to the Postage on Letters and Packets conveyed by the Post within the British Dominions in America and the West Indies, and to any Felony or other Offence committed within such Dominions.
7 Geo. 3. c. 50	Post Office Offences and Isle of Man Postage Act 1767	An Act for amending certain Laws relating to the Revenue of the Post Office, and for granting Rates of Postage for the Conveyance of Letters and Packets between Great Britain and the Isle of Man, and within that Island.	The whole act, except so much thereof as relates to any Felony or other Offence committed within the British Dominions in America and the West Indies.
9 Geo. 3. c. 35	Customs, etc. Act 1769	An Act for discontinuing upon the Exportation of Iron imported in Foreign Ships the Drawback of such Part of the Duties payable thereon as exceeds the Duties payable on Iron imported in British Ships; to prohibit the Exportation of Pig and Bar Iron and certain Naval Stores, unless the Pre-emption thereof be offered to the Commissioners of the Navy; to repeal so much of an Act made in the Sixth Year of His present Majesty's Reign as discontinued the Drawback upon Foreign rough Hemp exported; for providing a Compensation to the Clerks in the Offices of the Principal Secretaries of State for the Advantages such Clerks enjoyed before the Commencement of an Act made in the Fourth Year of the Reign of His present Majesty for preventing Frauds and Abuses in relation to the sending and receiving Letters and Packets free from the Duty of Postage, and to explain and amend the said Act.	So much as relates to the Post Office, except so much thereof as directs the Payment out of the Revenues of the Post Office of the annual Sum of Fifteen hundred Pounds to or for the Use of the Clerks in the Offices of Her Majesty's Principal Secretaries of State.
22 Geo. 3. c. 70	Postage Act 1782	An Act to enable the Commander in Chief of His Majesty's Forces and the Secretary to the Commander in Chief of His Majesty's Forces to send and receive Letters and Packets free from the Duty of Postage.	The whole act.
23 Geo. 3. c. 69	Postage Act 1783	An Act to enable the Adjutant General of His Majesty's Forces and the Comptrollers of Army Accounts to send and receive Letters and Packets free from the Duty of Postage.	The whole act.
23 & 24 Geo. 3. c. 17 (I)	Post Office Act 1783	An Act for establishing a Post Office within this Kingdom.	The whole act.
24 Geo. 3. Sess. 1. c. 6	Postage (No. 2) Act 1783	An Act for establishing certain Regulations concerning the Portage and Conveyance of Letters and Packets by the Post between Great Britain and Ireland.	The whole act.
24 Geo. 3. Sess. 2. c. 8	Postage Act 1784	An Act for establishing certain Regulations concerning the Portage and Conveyance of Letters and Packets by the Post between Great Britain and Ireland.	The whole act.
24 Geo. 3. Sess. 2. c. 37	National Debt (No. 2) Act 1784	An Act for granting to His Majesty certain additional Rates of Postage for Conveyance of Letters and Packets by the Post within the Kingdom of Great Britain; for preventing Frauds in the Revenue carried on by the Conveyance of certain Goods in Letters and Packets; and for further preventing Frauds and Abuses in relation to the sending and receiving of Letters and Packets free from Postage.	The whole act, except so far as relates to the Payment and Appropriation of the weekly Sum of Two thousand three hundred Pounds thereby directed to be paid into the Receipt of the Exchequer, and as relates to the Hereditary Revenue.
25 Geo. 3. c. 57	Turnpike Toll Act 1785	An Act to exempt Carriages carrying the Mail from paying Tolls at any Turnpike Gate in Great Britain.	The whole act.
25 Geo. 3. c. 60	Appropriation, etc. Act 1785	An Act for granting to His Majesty a certain Sum of Money out of the Sinking Fund, and for applying certain Monies therein mentioned for the Service of the Year One thousand seven hundred and eighty-five, and for further appropriating the Supplies granted in this Session of Parliament; and for providing a Compensation to the Clerks in the Offices of the Principal Secretaries of State for the Advantage such Clerks enjoyed before the Commencement of an Act made in the Twenty-fourth Year of the Reign of His present Majesty, for establishing certain Regulations concerning the Portage and Conveyance of Letters and Packets by the Post between Great Britain and Ireland.	So much as relates to the Post Office, except so much thereof as respects the Payment out of the Revenues of the Post Office of an annual Sum of One thousand Pounds to or for the Use of the Clerks in the Offices of Her Majesty's Principal Secretaries of State.
27 Geo. 3. c. 9	Postage Act 1787	An Act for granting Rates of Postage for the Conveyance of Letters and Packets between Great Britain and the Port of Waterford in the Kingdom of Ireland, by way of Milford Haven.	The whole act.
28 Geo. 3. c. 13 (I)	Post Office Act 1788	An Act to explain and amend an Act passed in the Twenty-third and Twenty-fourth Years of His present Majesty's Reign, intituled "An Act for establishing a Post Office within this Kingdom."	The whole act.
33 Geo. 3. c. 60	Mail to Spain Act 1793	An Act to enable the Postmaster General to send the Mail to the Dominions of His Catholic Majesty on board of any Vessels authorized by His Catholic Majesty to carry the same.	The whole act.
34 Geo. 3. c. 17	Penny Post Act 1794	An Act for regulating the Portage and Conveyance of Letters by the Carriage called the Penny Post.	The whole act.
34 Geo. 3. c. 18	Postage Act 1794	An Act for granting Rates of Postage for the Conveyance of Letters and Packets between Great Britain and the Islands of Jersey and Guernsey, and within those Islands.	The whole act.
35 Geo. 3. c. 53	Postage Act 1795	An Act for further regulating the sending and receiving Letters free from the Duty of Postage; for allowing Non-commissioned Officers, Seamen, and Private Men in the Navy and Army, whilst on Service, to send and receive Letters at a low Rate of Postage; and for permitting Patterns and Samples of Goods to be transmitted by the Post at an easier Rate than is now allowed by Law.	The whole act.
36 Geo. 3. c. 7 (I)	Post Office Act 1796	An Act to further explain and amend an Act passed in the Twenty-third and Twenty-fourth Years of His present Majesty's Reign, intituled ''An Act for establishing a Post Office within this Kingdom;'' and also to explain and amend an Act passed in the Twenty-eighth Year of His present Majesty's Reign, intituled 'An Act to explain and amend an Act passed in the Twenty-third and Twenty fourth Years of His present Majesty's Reign, intituled 'An Act for establishing a Post Office within this Kingdom'".	The whole act.
37 Geo. 3. c. 18	Postage Act 1796	An Act to further explain and amend an Act passed in the Twenty-third and Twenty-fourth Years of His present Majesty's Reign, intituled "An Act for establishing a Post Office within this Kingdom;" and also to explain and amend an Act passed in the Twenty-eighth Year of His present Majesty's Reign, intituled "An Act to explain and amend an Act passed in the Twenty-third and Twenty fourth Years of His present Majesty's Reign, intituled 'An Act for establishing a Post Office within this Kingdom.'"	The whole act.
38 Geo. 3. c. 47 (I)	Post Office Act 1798	An Act for altering certain Rates of Postage for Conveyance of Letters in England and Scotland respectively, and of Packets to and from Great Britain, from and to Portugal and the British Colonies in America respectively; and for setting apart at the Receipt of the Exchequer, for a certain Period, out of the Revenues of the Post Office, the annual Sum of Forty thousand Pounds towards defraying the increased Charge occasioned by any Loan raised or Stock created by any Act or Acts passed in the Thirty-fifth Year of the Reign of His present Majesty.	The whole act, except so much thereof as relates to the Application of the Revenue of the Post Office.
39 Geo. 3. c. 76	Postage Act 1799	An Act for the further Amendment of the Acts relating to the Post Office, and for further facilitating Prosecutions under the said Acts.	The whole act.
40 Geo. 3. c. 8 (I)	Postage Act 1800	An Act for the more secure Conveyance of Ship Letters, and for granting to His Majesty certain Rates of Postage thereon.	The whole act.
41 Geo. 3. (U.K.). c. 7	Postage Act 1801	An Act for granting to His Majesty, His Heirs and Successors, certain Duties and Rates upon the Portage and Conveyance of all Letters and Packets within this Kingdom.	The whole act.
42 Geo. 3. c. 63	Postage Act 1802	An Act to authorize the sending and receiving of Letters and Packets, Votes, Proceedings in Parliament, and printed Newspapers by the Post, free from the Duty of Postage by the Members of the Two Houses of Parliament of the United Kingdom, and by certain public Officers therein named; and for reducing the Postage on such Votes, Proceedings, and Newspapers when sent by any other Persons.	The whole act.
42 Geo. 3. c. 81	Post Office Act 1802	An Act for amending so much of an Act passed in the Seventh Year of the Reign of His present Majesty as relates to the secreting, embezzling, or destroying any Letter or Packet sent by the Post; and for the better Protection of such Letters and Packets; and for more effectually preventing Letters and Packets being sent otherwise than by the Post.	The whole act.
42 Geo. 3. c. 101	Postage (No. 2) Act 1802	An Act for repealing the Rates and Duties of Postage upon Letters to and from France and the Batavian Republic from and to London, and for granting other Rates and Duties in lieu thereof; and for exempting from the Duty of Tonnage the Ships and Vessels to be employed in conveying the Mails of Letters from France to the United Kingdom of Great Britain and Ireland.	The whole act.
43 Geo. 3. c. 28	Postage Act 1803	An Act for granting to His Majesty certain Rates and Duties upon Letters and Packets sent by the Post within Ireland.	The whole act.
43 Geo. 3. c. 31	Woods and Forests Act 1803	An Act for establishing certain Regulations in the Office of Surveyor General of His Majesty's Woods, Forests, Parks, and Chases.	So much as relates to the Post Office and the sending and receiving Letters and Packets by the Post free from the Duty of Postage.
43 Geo. 3. c. 119	Chest at Chatham Act 1803	An Act for improving the Funds of the Chest at Chatham; and for transferring the Administration of the same to Greenwich Hospital; and for ameliorating the Condition of the Pensioners on the said Funds.	So much as relates to the Post Office and the sending and receiving Letters and Packets by the Post free from the Duty of Postage.
44 Geo. 3. c. 84	Postage Act 1804	An Act to permit certain Persons in the Office of Ordnance, and the Quarter Master General, to send and receive Letters free from the Duty of Postage; and to enable the Board of Ordnance, the Adjutant General, the Quarter Master General, and the Barrack Master General to authorize Persons in their Offices to send Letters free from the said Duty.	The whole act.
45 Geo. 3. c. 11	Postage Act 1805	An Act for granting certain additional Rates and Duties in Great Britain on the Conveyance of Letters.	The whole act.
45 Geo. 3. c. 21	Postage (No. 2) Act 1805	An Act for repealing certain Duties upon Letters and Packets sent by the Post within Ireland, and granting other Duties in lieu thereof.	The whole act.
45 Geo. 3. c. 72	Manning of the Navy Act 1805	An Act for the Encouragement of Seamen, and for the better and more effectually manning His Majesty's Navy during the present War.	So much as relates to the Post Office and the sending Letters and Packets by the Post free from the Duty of Postage.
46 Geo. 3. c. 61	Postage Act 1806	An Act to authorize certain Public Officers to send and receive Letters and Packets by the Post free from the Duty of Postage.	The whole act.
46 Geo. 3. c. 73	Postage (No. 2) Act 1806	An Act for granting Rates of Postage on the Conveyance of Letters and Packets to and from Gibraltar and the Island of Malta.	The whole act.
46 Geo. 3. c. 83	Post Office Act 1806	An Act for the better Regulation of the Office of Receiver General of the Post Office in England.	The whole act.
46 Geo. 3. c. 92	Postage (No. 3) Act 1806	An Act to amend Three Acts made in the Thirty-fifth, Forty-first, and Forty-second Years of His present Majesty, relating to the Conveyance of Letters and Packets by the Post.	The whole act.
46 Geo. 3. c. 142	Woods and Forests Act 1806	An Act for the better Regulation of the Office of Surveyor General of Woods and Forests.	So much as relates to the Post Office and the sending and receiving of Letters and Packets by the Post free from the Duty of Postage.
47 Geo. 3. Sess. 2. c. 59	Post Office (No. 2) Act 1807	An Act to amend an Act of the Forty-sixth Year of His Majesty, for the better Regulation of the Office of Receiver General of the Post Office in England.	The whole act.
48 Geo. 3. c. 90	Postage Act 1808	An Act to enable the Commissioners for auditing Public Accounts, and the Commissioners for the Affairs of Barracks respectively, to send and receive Letters and Packets on the Business of their Office free of Postage.	The whole act.
48 Geo. 3. c. 116	Postage (No. 2) Act 1808	An Act for granting to His Majesty Rates of Postage on the Conveyance of Letters and Packets to and from the Island of Madeira and to and from the Portuguese Territories on the Continent of South America.	The whole act.
49 Geo. 3. c. 35	Pensions for Naval Officers' Widows Act 1809	An Act for the more convenient Payment of Pensions to Widows of Officers of the Navy.	So much as relates to the Post Office.
49 Geo. 3. c. 45	Compassionate List of the Navy, etc. Act 1809	An Act for more conveniently paying of Allowances on the Compassionate List of the Navy and of Half Pay to Officers of the Royal Marines.	So much as relates to the Post Office.
49 Geo. 3. c. 108	Wages and Prize Money, etc., in the Navy Act 1809	An Act to amend the several Acts respecting the Payment of Wages and Prize Money and Allotment of Wages to Persons serving in His Majesty's Royal Navy.	So much as relates to the Post Office.
49 Geo. 3. c. 123	Prize Money Act 1809	An Act to explain and amend an Act made in the Forty-fifth Year of His present Majesty, for the Encouragement of Seamen, and for the better and more effectually manning His Majesty's Navy during the present War; and for the further Encouragement of Seamen, and for the better and more effectually providing for the Interests of the Royal Hospital for Seamen at Greenwich and the Royal Hospital for Soldiers at Chelsea; and to extend the Provisions of the said Act to Cases arising in consequence of Hostilities commenced since the passing of the said Act.	So much as relates to the Post Office and the sending and receiving Letters and Packets by the Post free from the Duty of Postage.
50 Geo. 3. c. 65	Crown Lands Act 1810	An Act for uniting the Offices of Surveyor General of the Land Revenues of the Crown and Surveyor General of His Majesty's Woods, Forests, Parks, and Chases.	So much as relates to the Post Office and the sending and receiving Letters and Packets by the Post free from the Duty of Postage.
50 Geo. 3. c. 66	Postage Act 1810	An Act to authorize the Judge Advocate General to send and receive Letters and Packets free from the Duty of Postage.	The whole act.
50 Geo. 3. c. 74	Postage (No. 2) Act 1810	An Act to grant to His Majesty certain additional Duties upon Letters and Packets sent by the Post within Ireland.	The whole act.
52 Geo. 3. c. 88	Postage Act 1812	An Act for granting to His Majesty certain additional Rates of Postage in Great Britain.	The whole act.
52 Geo. 3. c. 132	Unclaimed Prize Money, etc. Act 1812	An Act for explaining, amending, and extending the several Laws relative to the Payment of forfeited and unclaimed Shares of Army Prize Money to the Royal Hospital at Chelsea ; and for directnig the Mode of making up the Accounts of Pensions paid to the Widows of Officers of the Army.	So much as relates to the Post Office and the sending and receiving Letters and Packets by the Post free from the Duty of Postage.
52 Geo. 3. c. 143	Land Tax Certificates Forgery Act 1812	An Act for amending and reducing into One Act the Provisions contained in any Laws now in force imposing the Penalty of Death for any Act done in breach of or in resistance to any Part of the Laws for collecting His Majesty's Revenue in Great Britain.	So much as relates to the Post Office.
53 Geo. 3. c. 13	Postage (No. 2) Act 1812	An Act for authorizing the Assistant Secretary to the Postmaster General to send and receive Letters and Packets free from the Duty on Postage.	The whole act.
53 Geo. 3. c. 58	Postage Act 1813	An Act to repeal certain Rates and Duties upon Letters and Packets sent by the Post from or to Dublin to or from the several Post Towns in Ireland, and to grant other Rates and Duties in lieu thereof; and to make further Regulations for securing the Duties on Letters and Packets sent by the Post in Ireland.	The whole act.
53 Geo. 3. c. 68	Postage, etc. Act 1813	An Act to repeal the Exemption from Toll granted for or in respect of Carriages with more than Two Wheels carrying the Mail in Scotland, and for granting a Rate for Postage as an Indemnity for the Loss which may arise to the Revenue of the Post Office from the Payment of such Tolls.	The whole act.
54 Geo. 3. c. 119	Postage Act 1814	An Act to repeal certain Duties upon Letters and Packets sent by the Post within Ireland, and to grant other Duties in lieu thereof.	The whole act.
54 Geo. 3. c. 169	Postage (No. 2) Act 1814	An Act for making certain Regulations respecting the Postage of Ship Letters and of Letters in Great Britain.	The whole act.
55 Geo. 3. c. 103	Postage Act 1815	An Act to regulate the Postage of Ship Letters to and from Ireland.	The whole act.
55 Geo. 3. c. 145	Postal Service Act 1815	An Act to increase the Allowance to the Post Office in Ireland in respect of Packet Boats to Great Britain.	The whole act.
55 Geo. 3. c. 153	Postage (No. 2) Act 1815	An Act for granting certain Rates on the Postage of Letters to and from Great Britain, the Cape of Good Hope, the Mauritius, and the East Indies; and for making certain Regulations respecting the Postage of Ship Letters and of Letters in Great Britain.	The whole act.
56 Geo. 3. c. 98	Consolidated Fund Act 1816	An Act to unite and consolidate into One Fund all the Public Revenues of Great Britain and Ireland, and to provide for the Application thereof to the general Service of the United Kingdom.	So much as relates to the sending and receiving Letters and Packets by the Post free from the Duty of Postage.
57 Geo. 3. c. 9	Comptroller of Barrack Department Act 1817	An Act for vesting all Estates and Property occupied for the Barrack Service in the Comptroller of the Barrack Department, and for granting certain Powers to the said Comptroller.	So much as relates to the Post Office and the sending and receiving Letters and Packets by the Post free from the Duty of Postage.
57 Geo. 3. c. 66	Board of Trade Act 1817	An Act to amend an Act of the Twenty-second Year of His present Majesty, for suppressing or regulating certain Offices therein mentioned, so far as relates to the Board of Trade; and for enabling the Vice-President of the Board of Trade to send and receive Letters and Packets free from the Duty of Postage.	So much as relates to the Post Office and the sending and receiving Letters and Packets by the Post free from the Duty of Postage.
58 Geo. 3. c. 45	Church Building Act 1818	An Act for building and promoting the building of additional Churches in populous Parishes.	So much as relates to the Post Office and the sending and receiving Letters and Packets by the Post free from the Duty of Postage.
59 Geo. 3. c. 108	Post Office (Ireland) Act 1819	An Act to amend several Acts relating to the Post Office and Conveyance of Letters in Ireland.	The whole act.
59 Geo. 3. c. 111	Postage Act 1819	An Act to repeal so much of an Act passed in the Fifty-fifth Year of His present Majesty as relates to the Postage and Conveyance of Letters to and from the Cape of Good Hope, Ceylon, the Mauritius, and the East Indies; and to make other Regulations respecting the Postage of such Letters and Packets, and other Letters and Packets sent by the Post.	The whole act.
1 Geo. 4. c. 89	Postage Act 1820	An Act for imposing additional Rates and Duties on the Conveyance of Letters between Port Patrick in Scotland and Donaghadee in Ireland.	The whole act.
3 Geo. 4. c. 105	Postage Act 1822	An Act for granting Rates of Postage for the Conveyance of Letters and Packets between the Port of Liverpool in the County of Lancaster and the Isle of Man.	The whole act.
3 Geo. 4. c. 126	Turnpike Roads Act 1822	An Act to amend the General Laws now in being for regulating Turnpike Roads in that Part of Great Britain called England.	So much as relates to the Exemption of Horses and Carriages employed or to be employed in carrying the Mails and Expresses from Payment of Tolls.
4 Geo. 4. c. 49	Turnpike Roads (Scotland) Act 1823	An Act for regulating Turnpike Roads in that Part of Great Britain called Scotland.	So much as relates to the Exemption of Horses and Carriages employed or to be employed in conveying the Mails from Payment of Tolls, and as authorizes the Trustees of Turnpikes to enter into any Agreement with the Postmaster General as to the Amount of Tolls to be paid for Mail Coaches.
4 Geo. 4. c. 81	East India Company's Service Act 1823	An Act to consolidate and amend the Laws for punishing Mutiny and Desertion of Officers and Soldiers in the Service of the East India Company, and to authorize Soldiers and Sailors in the East Indies to send and receive Letters at a reduced Rate of Postage.	So much as relates to the Post Office.
4 Geo. 4. c. 95	Turnpike Roads Act 1823	An Act to explain and amend an Act passed in the Third Year of the Reign of His present Majesty, to amend the General Laws now in being for regulating Turnpike Roads in that Part of Great Britain called England.	So much as tends to affect the Exemption from Payment of Tolls of Horses and Carriages employed or to be employed in conveying the Mails and Expresses under the Authority of Her Majesty's Postmaster General, either when employed in conveying, fetching, or guarding such Mails or Expresses or in returning back from conveying or guarding the same.
5 Geo. 4. c. 10	Postage Act 1824	An Act for granting to His Majesty Rates of Postage on the Conveyance of Letters and Packets to and from Buenos Ayres or other Port or Ports on the Continent of South America.	The whole act.
5 Geo. 4. c. 20	Conveyance by Post of Bank Notes, etc. Act 1824	An Act to regulate the Conveyance of Packets containing re-issuable Country Bank Notes by the Post, and to charge Rates of Postage thereon; to prevent Letters and Packets being sent otherwise than by the Post; to punish Persons embezzling printed Proceedings in Parliament or Newspapers; and to allow the President of the Commissioners of Revenue Inquiry to send and receive Letters and Packets free from the Duty of Postage.	The whole act.
6 Geo. 4. c. 28	Postage Act 1825	An Act for granting Rates of Postage for the Conveyance of Letters and Packets between Great Britain and Ireland by way of Liverpool.	The whole act.
6 Geo. 4. c. 44	Postage (No. 2) Act 1825	An Act for granting to His Majesty Rates of Postage on the Conveyance of Letters and Packets to and from Columbia and Mexico.	The whole act.
6 Geo. 4. c. 68	Postage (No. 3) Act 1825	An Act to regulate the Conveyance of printed Votes and Proceedings in Parliament, and printed Newspapers, by Packet Boats between Great Britain and Ireland and the British Colonies, and also in the United Kingdom.	The whole act, except so far as respects the Compensation to Officers of the Post Office having the Privilege of Franking.
7 Geo. 4. c. 16	Chelsea and Kilmainham Hospitals Act 1826	An Act to consolidate and amend several Acts relating to the Royal Hospitals for Soldiers at Chelsea and Kilmainham.	So much as relates to the Post Office and the sending and receiving of Letters and Packets by the Post free from the Duty of Postage.
7 & 8 Geo. 4. c. 6	Postage Act 1827	An Act for granting to His Majesty Rates of Postage on the Conveyance of Letters and Packets to and from Saint Domingo and Cuba.	The whole act.
7 & 8 Geo. 4. c. 21	Postage (No. 2) Act 1827	An Act to amend the Laws relating to the Duties of Postage in Great Britain and Ireland.	The whole act.
7 & 8 Geo. 4. c. 58	Average Price of Corn Act 1827	An Act to make Provision for ascertaining from Time to Time the Average Prices of British Corn.	So much as relates to the Post Office and the sending and receiving of Letters and Packets by the Post free from the Duty of Postage.
9 Geo. 4. c. 42	Church Building Society Act 1828	An Act to abolish Church Briefs, and to provide for the better Collection and Application of voluntary Contributions for the Purpose of enlarging and building Churches and Chapels.	So much as relates to the Post Office and the sending and receiving of Letters and Packets by the Post free from the Duty of Postage.
10 Geo. 4. c. 26	Greenwich Hospital Outpensions, etc. Act 1829	An Act for transferring the Management of Greenwich Out-pensions, and certain Duties in Matters of Prize, to the Treasurer of the Navy.	So much as relates to the Post Office and the sending and receiving of Letters and Packets by the Post free from the Duty of Postage.
1 Will. 4. c. 8	Postmaster-General Act 1831	An Act for enabling His Majesty to appoint a Postmaster General for the United Kingdom of Great Britain and Ireland.	The whole act.
1 & 2 Will. 4. c. 43	Turnpike Roads (Scotland) Act 1831	An Act for amending and making more effectual the Laws concerning Turnpike Roads in Scotland.	So much as relates to the Post Office.
2 Will. 4. c. 15	Post Office Act 1832	An Act to enable His Majesty's Postmaster General to extend the Accommodation by Post, and to regulate the Privilege of Franking in Ireland; and for other Purposes relating to the Post Office.	The whole act.
2 Will. 4. c. 53	Army Prize Money Act 1832	An Act for consolidating and amending the Laws relating to the Payment of Army Prize Money.	So much as relates to the Post Office and the sending and receiving of Letters and Packets by the Post free from the Duty of Postage.
2 & 3 Will. 4. c. 106	Officers and Persons on the Compassionate List, etc. Act 1832	An Act to enable the Officers in His Majesty's Army, and their Representatives, and the Widows of Officers, and Persons on the Compassionate List, and also Civil Officers on Retired or Superannuation Allowances payable by the Paymaster General of His Majesty's Forces, to draw for and receive their Half Pay and Allowances.	The whole act.
4 & 5 Will. 4. c. 44	Postage Act 1834	An Act to regulate the Conveyance of printed Newspapers by the Post between the United Kingdom, the British Colonies, and Foreign Parts.	The whole act.
5 & 6 Will. 4. c. 25	Post Office Act 1835	An Act to extend the Accommodation by the Post to and from Foreign Parts, and for other Purposes relating to the Post Office.	The whole act.
6 Will. 4. c. 21	Letter Stealing (Scotland) Act 1836	An Act to provide that Persons in Scotland accused of Letter Stealing shall not be entitled to Liberation on Bail, unless in certain Cases.	The whole act.
6 Will. 4. c. 25	Postage Act 1836	An Act for granting an additional Rate of Postage on Letters between Great Britain and Ireland by way of Milford and Waterford.	So much as imposed additional Rates of Postage on Letters and Packets conveyed by Post to and from Great Britain and Ireland, or to and from any Part beyond the Seas and Ireland, by way of Milford and Waterford.
6 & 7 Will. 4. c. 54	Post Office (Newspapers) Act 1836	An Act to consolidate and amend the Laws relating to the Conveyance of Newspapers by the Post.	The whole act.

== Subsequent developments ==
The whole act was repealed by section 92 of, and the second schedule to, the Post Office Act 1908 (8 Edw. 7. c. 48), which came into force on 1 May 1909.
