= Post Office Act 1908 =

Act of the Parliament of the United Kingdom

Post Office Act 1908 (Note: Section 94.)
- Act of Parliament
- Parliament of the United Kingdom
- Long title: An Act to consolidate Enactments relating to the Post Office.
- Citation: 8 Edw. 7. c. 48
- Territorial extent: United Kingdom

Dates
- Royal assent: 21 December 1908
- Commencement: 1 May 1909 (Note: Section 93.)
- Repealed: 31 August 1953
Other legislation
Amends	See § Repealed enactments
Repeals/revokes	See § Repealed enactments
Amended by	Post Office Act 1913; Indictments Act 1915; Representation of the People Act 1918; Post Office and Telegraph Act 1920; Territorial Army and Militia Act 1921; Local Government Act 1933; Post Office (Amendment) Act 1935; Local Government (Scotland) Act 1947
Repealed by	Post Office Act 1953

Status: Repealed

Text of statute as originally enacted

The Post Office Act 1908 (8 Edw. 7. c. 48) was an act of the Parliament of the United Kingdom

This was an extensive act covering many aspect of the mail system and some of the main provisions were: reaffirmation of the General Post Office monopoly for the carrying of mail and it gave the power to fix the postage rates to The Treasury with a minimum rate of at least one penny for an inland letter, a half-penny for a postcard, a book packet should not cost more than one halfpenny for every two ounces in weight in addition to other rates. Special rates were to be implemented for postal packets of books and papers impressed for blind people. Unpaid or deficient postage was to be charged at double the deficiency by the addressee and when rejected by the addressee, was to be returned to the sender who should pay the deficiency.

The Treasury was allowed to make regulations concerning mail with foreign countries.

Petitions and addresses to His Majesty or to Parliament, and on votes and parliamentary proceedings were allowed to be sent free though members of parliament could not receive items weighing more than thirty-two ounces postage free.

Postal censorship was permitted under provisions of the act when warrants are issued by a secretary of state in both Great Britain and in the Channel Islands.

Some of the lesser provisions were:

- To provide postal services (including cash on delivery services) and telecommunication services
- To provide a banking service of the kind commonly known as a giro system and such other services by means of which money may be remitted (whether by means of money orders, postal orders or otherwise) as it thinks fit
- To provide data processing services
- To perform services for Her Majesty's Government in the United Kingdom, Her Majesty's Government in Northern Ireland or the government of a country or territory outside the United Kingdom or for local or national health service authorities in the United Kingdom.

== Ireland ==
The act remained as the main legislation governing the postal services under the Minister for Posts and Telegraphs in Ireland after the establishment of the independent state in 1922. The Post Office (Amendment) Bill, 1951 repealed and amended several sections of the original act and was presented by the Minister for Posts and Telegraphs, Erskine Childers in Dáil Éireann.

== Provisions ==
=== Repealed enactments ===
Section 92 of the act repealed 35 enactments, listed in the second schedule to the act.

Citation	Short title	Extent of repeal
9 Anne c. 11	Post Office (Revenues) Act 1710	So much as is unrepealed.
7 Will. 4 & 1 Vict. c. 32	Post Office (Repeal of Laws) Act 1837	The whole act.
7 Will. 4 & 1 Vict. c. 33	Post Office Management Act 1837	The whole act.
7 Will. 4 & 1 Vict. c. 36	Post Office (Offences) Act 1837	The whole act.
3 & 4 Vict. c. 96	Post Office (Duties) Act 1840	The whole act.
7 & 8 Vict. c. 49	Post Office (Duties) Act 1844	The whole act.
10 & 11 Vict. c. 85	Post Office (Duties) Act 1847	The whole act, except sections sixteen and twenty. Section twenty from " and . . . . the following “to ” eighth “year of the reign of Her ” present Majesty."
11 & 12 Vict. c. 88	Post Office (Money Orders) Act 1848	The whole act.
12 & 13 Vict. c. 66	Colonial Inland Post Office Act 1849	The whole act.
17 & 18 Vict. c. 94	Public Revenue and Consolidated Fund Charges Act 1854	So much as relates to charges or payments charged upon the Post Office Revenue.
18 & 19 Vict. c. 78	Inland Revenue Act 1855	Section four.
23 & 24 Vict. c. 65	Post Office (Duties) Act 1860	The whole act.
26 & 27 Vict. c. 43	Post Office Lands Act 1863	The whole act.
32 & 33 Vict. c. 73	Telegraph Act 1869	Section twenty-three to "Provided always that."
33 & 34 Vict. c. 79	Post Office Act 1870	The whole act.
38 & 39 Vict. c. 22	Post Office Act 1875	The whole act.
42 & 43 Vict. c. 49	Summary Jurisdiction Act 1879	In section fifty-three the words "The Summary Jurisdiction Acts shall apply to all informations, complaints, and other proceedings before a court of summary jurisdiction under the statutes relating to the Post Office."
43 & 44 Vict. c. 33	Post Office (Money Orders) Act 1880	The whole act.
44 & 45 Vict. c. 19	Post Office (Newspaper) Act 1881	The whole act.
44 & 45 Vict. c. 20	Post Office (Land) Act 1881	The whole act.
45 & 46 Vict. c. 2	Post Office (Reply Post Cards) Act 1882	The whole act.
46 & 47 Vict. c. 58	Post Office (Money Orders) Act 1883	The whole act.
47 & 48 Vict. c. 76	Post Office (Protection) Act 1884	The whole act, except the first and third paragraphs of section one and sections eleven and seventeen.
52 & 53 Vict. c. 34	Telegraph (Isle of Man) Act 1889	Subsection seventeen of section one.
54 & 55 Vict. c. 46	Post Office Act 1891	The whole act, except sections eleven and fourteen.
55 & 56 Vict. c. 24	Post Office Act 1892	The whole act.
58 & 59 Vict. c. 18	Post Office Amendment Act 1895	The whole act.
60 & 61 Vict. c. 41	Post Office and Telegraph Act 1897	Section two.
61 & 62 Vict. c. 18	Post Office (Guarantee) Act 1898	The whole act.
61 & 62 Vict. c. 37	Local Government (Ireland) Act 1898	Section seventy-five.
61 & 62 Vict. c. 59	Post Office Guarantee (No. 2) Act 1898	The whole act.
3 Edw. 7. c. 12	Post Office (Money Orders) Act 1903	The whole act.
4 Edw. 7. c. 14	Post Office Act 1904	The whole act.
6 Edw. 7. c. 4	Post Office (Money Orders) Act 1906	The whole act.
6 Edw. 7. c. 22	Post Office (Literature for the Blind) Act 1906	The whole act.

== Subsequent developments ==
The whole act was repealed by section 91(1) of, and the third schedule to, the Post Office Act 1953 (1 & 2 Eliz. 2. c. 36), which came into force on 31 August 1953.
