= Dog Nuisance Act 1844 =

Act of Parliament in New Zealand

The Dog Nuisance Act 1844 (or Dog Nuisance Ordinance) was created on 17 July 1844 to deal with the nuisance of dogs wandering freely around New Zealand towns. A newspaper report from Auckland in March 1844 stated:

There are more of the canine species in this town than in any other four times the size, and we care not how soon a dog act is [e]nforced to rid us of these brutes. The streets swarm with them, the greater portion apparently without owners. Strolling through the streets of a dark night, should you escape with the loss of a mere mouthful out of each calf, you may consider yourself extremely fortunate.

Under the act, all dogs wandering at large without their owner would be seized and kept for a night and day. The owner could claim their dog and pay a fine of five shillings for its return. If the dog had a collar with its owner's name on it, the fine was reduced to two shillings and sixpence. If a dog was not claimed in the specified time period, it would be hanged.

The new law was largely ineffectual. Residents in towns were disturbed day and night by groups of dogs barking and fighting, and dogs sometimes attacked people walking on city streets. Country areas were not included under the act, and farmers continued to suffer severe stock losses from attacks on sheep and calves by wandering dogs.

In 1849 a committee of the Legislative Council discussed the dog problem, noting that stock losses were a major issue and that the Dog Nuisance Act was not effective at reducing the problem. The committee recommended that the Dog Nuisance Act be repealed and replaced with a tax on every dog. The committee also considered Māori dog ownership. Although their dogs were sometimes a nuisance and occasionally attacked stock, it was recognised that Māori had traditionally kept a lot of dogs for pig-hunting and other purposes. The committee thought that Māori might not understand the intent of a dog tax, would find it oppressive, and might not be able to pay a tax anyway. The committee concluded that it was better to exempt Māori-owned dogs from taxation.

Accordingly, the Dog Nuisance Act was repealed on 11 June 1849 and replaced with 'An Ordinance to Abate the Dog Nuisance' which would be enforced in New Munster (the South Island and lower half of the North Island) and require all dog owners to register their dogs. Māori owners and their dogs living outside of towns would be exempt from the regulations. This was the first of 27 dog tax statutes enacted between 1849 and 1875 by the provincial governments of New Zealand. Provincial governments were abolished in 1876, and from 1880 local authorities were able to collect dog taxes.

== See also ==
- Dog Tax War – 1898 confrontation in New Zealand
