= Post Office (Offences) Act 1837 =

Act of the Parliament of the United Kingdom

Post Office (Offences) Act 1837 (Note: The citation of this act by this short title was authorised by section 1 of, and the first schedule to, the Short Titles Act 1896. Due to the repeal of those provisions it is now authorised by section 19(2) of the Interpretation Act 1978.)
- Act of Parliament
- Parliament of the United Kingdom
- Long title: An Act for consolidating the Laws relative to Offences against the Post Office of the United Kingdom, and for regulating the judicial Administration of the Post Office Laws, and for explaining certain Terms and Expressions employed in those Laws.
- Citation: 7 Will. 4 & 1 Vict. c. 36
- Territorial extent: United Kingdom; Isle of Man; Jersey; Guernsey; Sark; Alderney

Dates
- Royal assent: 12 July 1837
- Commencement: 1 August 1837 (Note: Section 1. The commencement of the Post Office (Repeal of Laws) Act 1837 (7 Will. 4 & 1 Vict. c. 32).)
- Repealed: 1 May 1909
Other legislation
Amends	See § Repealed enactments
Repeals/revokes	See § Repealed enactments
Amended by	Public Authorities Protection Act 1893
Repealed by	Post Office Act 1908
Relates to	Post Office (Repeal of Laws) Act 1837; Post Office (Management) Act 1837; Postage Act 1837; Postage Act 1837

Status: Repealed

Text of statute as originally enacted

The Post Office (Offences) Act 1837 (7 Will. 4 & 1 Vict. c. 36) was an act of the Parliament of the United Kingdom that consolidated enactments relating to offences against the Post Office of the United Kingdom.

== Subsequent developments ==
Section 46 of the act was repealed by section 2 of, and the schedule to, the Public Authorities Protection Act 1893 (56 & 57 Vict. c. 61), which came into force on 1 January 1894.

The whole act was repealed by section 92 of, and the second schedule to, the Post Office Act 1908 (8 Edw. 7. c. 48), which came into force on 1 May 1909.
