= Raupo Houses Ordinance =

Act of Parliament in New Zealand

Raupo Houses Ordinance 1842

New Zealand Parliament

Repealed by
- Repeals Act 1878
- Status: Repealed

The Raupo Houses Ordinance (also known as the Raupo Houses Act) was the first building legislation enacted in New Zealand. The ordinance was created on 3 March 1842, enabling the governor of New Zealand to proclaim that the ordinance could be put into force in any town or part of a town where it was deemed necessary for the prevention of fire risk. Where the ordinance was in force, an annual tax of £20 would be levied on any building in that town constructed "wholly or in part of raupo, nikau, toetoe, wiwi, kakaho, straw or thatch". Any person erecting a house of such materials after the ordinance was in force in a locality would be fined £100.

== Introduction ==
Early European settlers' houses and businesses were often constructed of raupō in a manner similar to traditional Māori housing, since it was cheap and quick to build with. However it was also highly flammable. A large fire swept through Wellington early in the morning of 9 November 1842. The fire started in a raupō bakehouse with a thatched roof, and a strong north-west wind spread the fire rapidly to other thatched roofs. Around 57 buildings were destroyed. Many of these were described as "Maori-houses", i.e. made of raupō or similar materials, as opposed to "wooden-houses". All of the buildings at Kumutoto Pā were destroyed. Just days after the fire, the Wellington Municipal Council requested that the governor proclaim the Raupo Houses Ordinance be effected in Wellington. The proclamation was made on 30 March 1843, to take effect six months from that date.

The ordinance was proclaimed in Auckland in May 1842, Dunedin and Port Chalmers in February 1850, Lyttelton in 1850, Christchurch in 1852, and in New Plymouth in 1857. After the ordinance was proclaimed in New Plymouth, but before it came into effect, a gale destroyed many of the thatched and raupō houses there. In 1858, New Plymouth repealed the act and replaced its £100 fine for building a raupō house with a lower fine of £20, under a new "Thatch and Straw Building Ordinance".

A census of the European population in Auckland and its vicinity published in 1849 showed that in some areas, raupō was still the most common material used in house construction: Ōtāhuhu had 2 weatherboard and 72 raupo houses, Howick had 50 weatherboard and 180 raupō houses, and Panmure had 5 weatherboard and 99 raupō houses. Overall, raupō houses made up almost a third of the total European housing in the Auckland area at that time.

== Repeal ==
Although the raw number of raupō houses built by Europeans had increased by the late 1850s, the number as a percentage of total European housing was in decline. The decline continued throughout the 1860s as more permanent building materials such as wood, brick or stone came into use. The Raupo Houses Ordinance was one of many ordinances and acts repealed in 1878 under the Repeals Act. By this time, only 0.55% of non-Māori dwellings nationwide were constructed of raupō.

== Māori housing ==
When the Raupo Houses Ordinance was proclaimed in Wellington on 30 March 1843, there was an exception made for the two pā at Pipitea and Te Aro. Raupō dwellings in the pā were not to be taxed. Kawau Pā at New Plymouth was similarly exempted when the ordinance was proclaimed there in 1857, although in 1866 the pā reserve was added to the area covered by New Plymouth's Thatch and Straw Building Ordinance. The Raupo Houses Ordinance was not targeted at Māori, and most Māori housing in New Zealand did not come under the control of the ordinance.

As European housing materials and construction materials became widespread, some Māori moved away from raupō buildings. One example is the people at a pā in Ōtaki who in 1847 were reported to be planning to build new homes in wood when they had some spare time to saw the timber required. In 1862, members of a rūnanga (tribal council) discussed whether or not a new courthouse and meeting place should be built in wood or raupō. Some preferred raupō, because it was familiar and quick to build with. Others preferred wood, because it would be more durable, resistant to wind, and need fewer repairs. Cost and the skills and tools required to construct a wooden building were also considered. One member stated: "If I could find sawyers I would have a wooden house; what is the good of a raupo building, it is always out of repair, besides my people are all young men and don't know how to build raupo houses".

Examples of raupo houses and whare

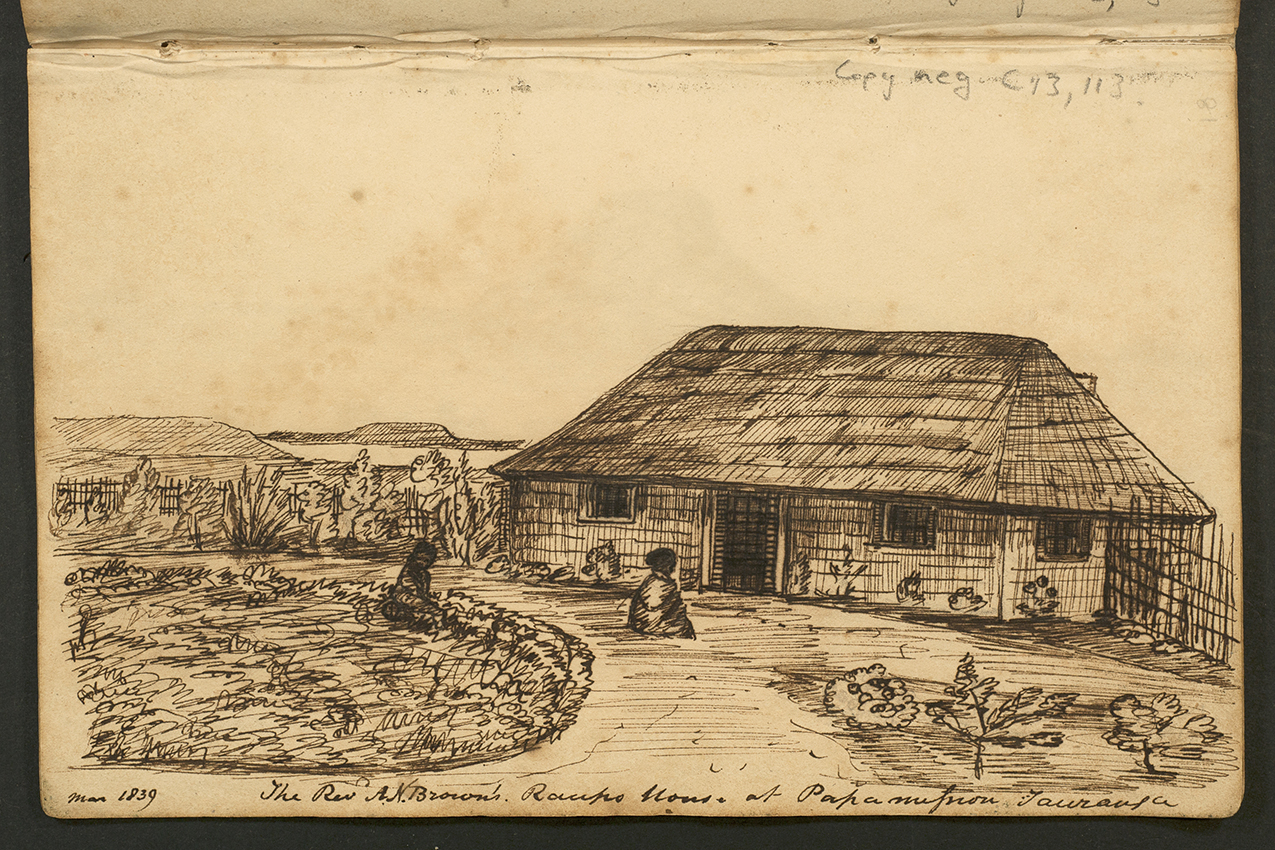
Rev. Brown's raupō house at Tauranga (1839)

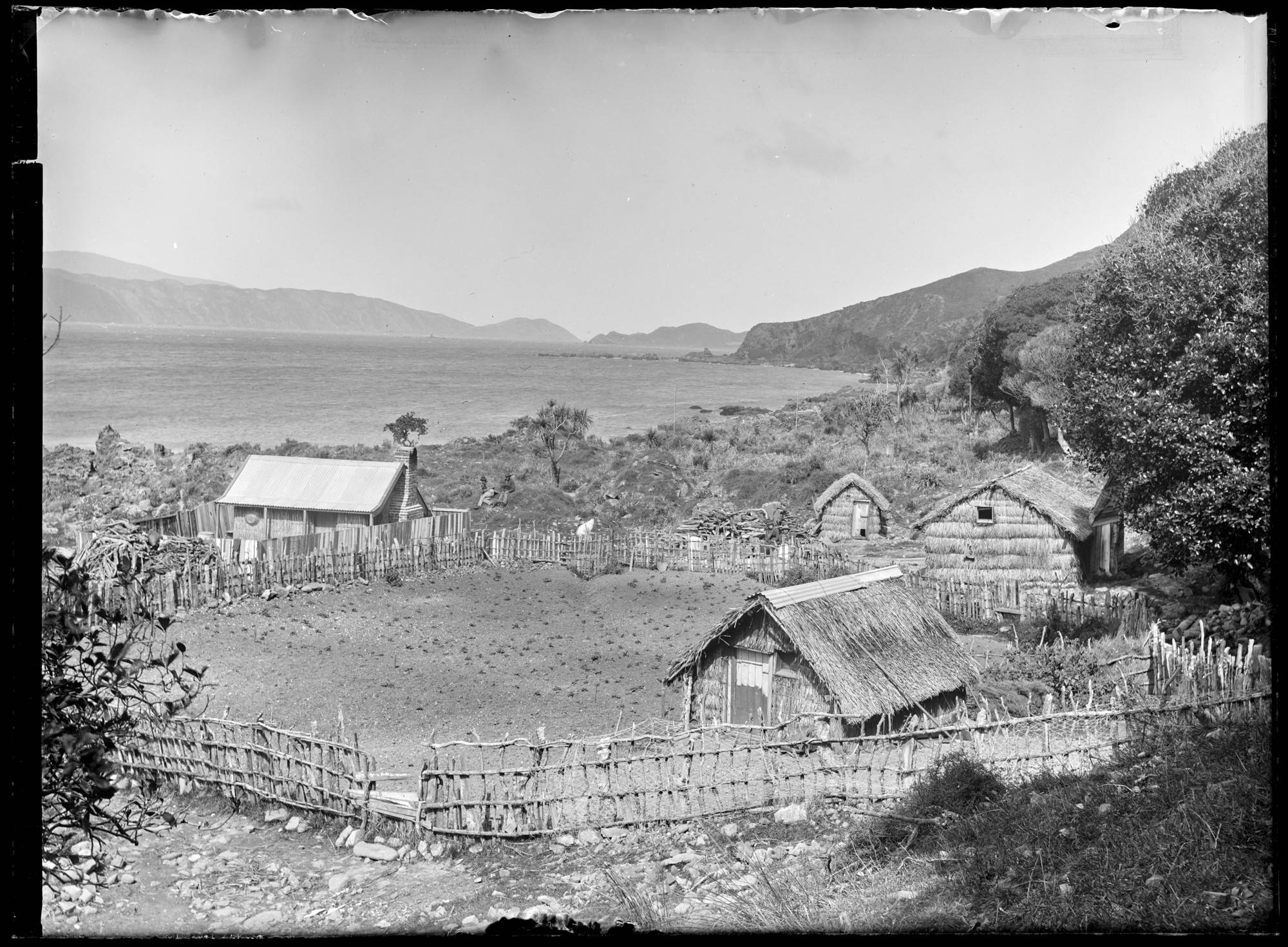
House and several raupō whare at Karaka Bay, Wellington (1880s)

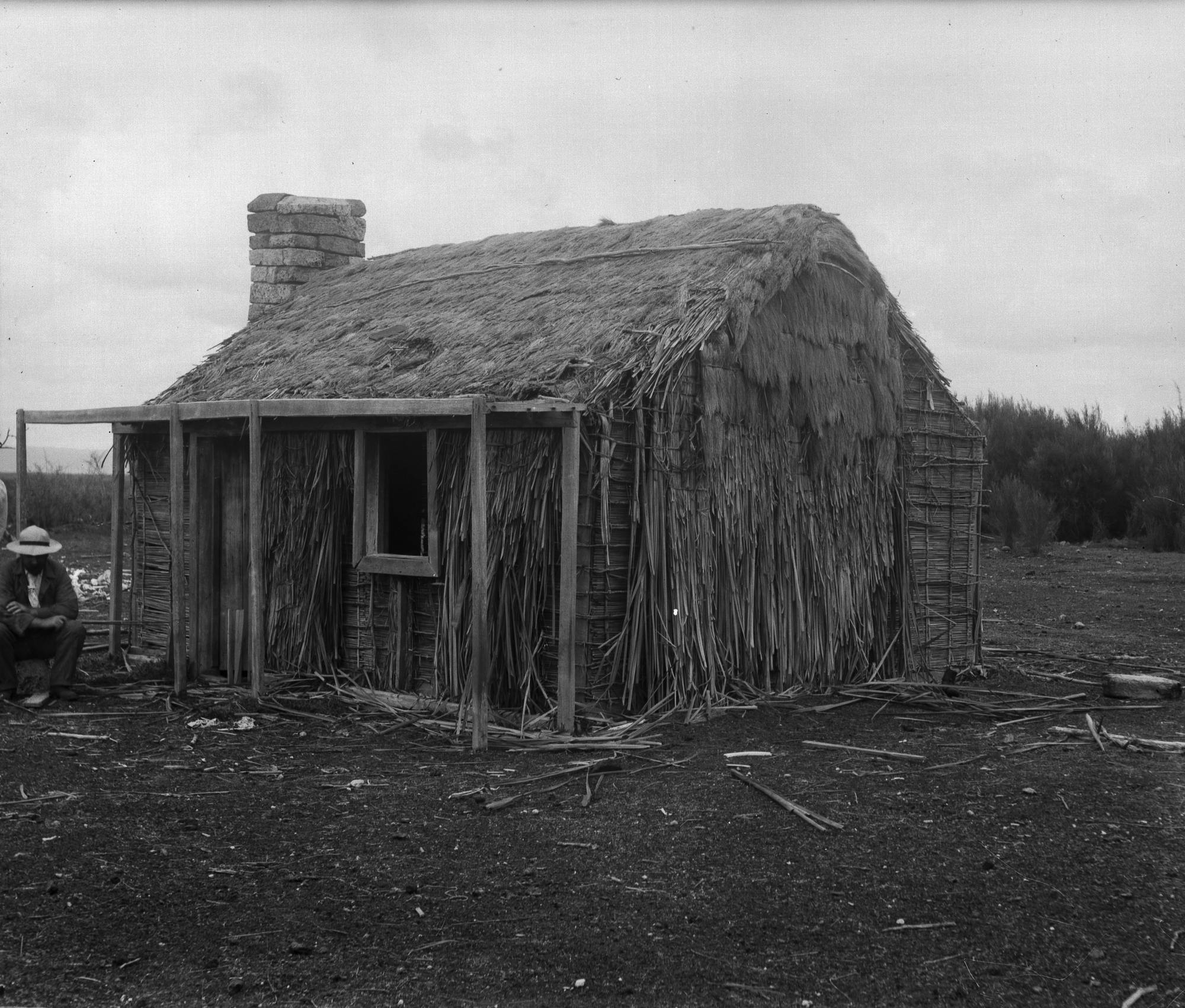
Raupō house with a pumice chimney, in disrepair, at Ohaaki, Reporoa (1908)

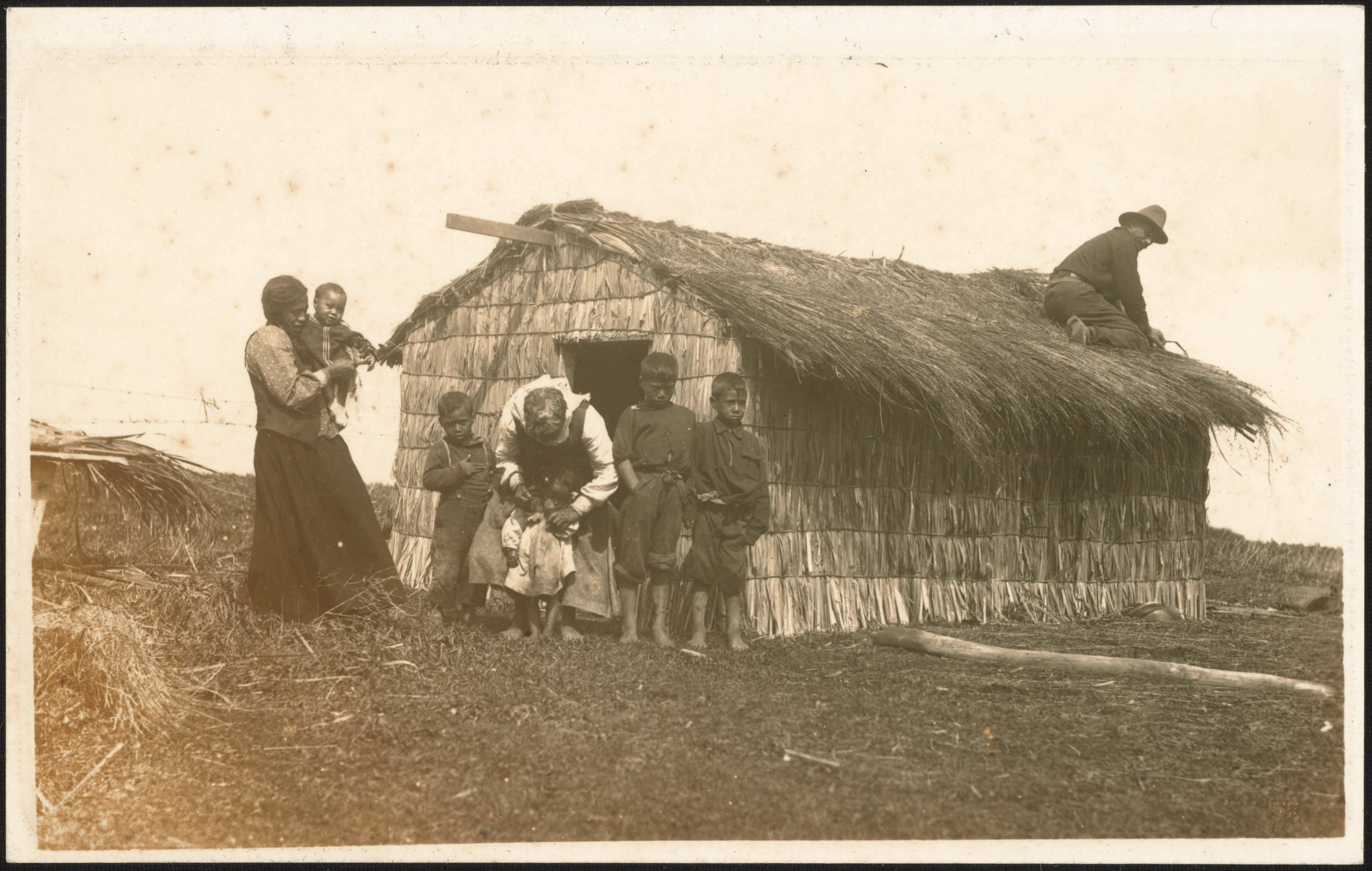
Māori family in front of a raupō whare (early 1900s)
