= Monarch (disambiguation) =

A monarch is the head of state of a monarchy, who holds the office for life or until abdication.

Monarch or Monarchy may also refer to:

== Biology ==
- Danaus (genus), a genus of butterflies commonly called monarchs

- Danaus plexippus, the North American butterfly most commonly referred to as the monarch butterfly

- Monarch flycatcher or Monarchidae, a family of passerine birds

== Places ==
=== Canada ===
- Monarch, Alberta
- Monarch Icefield, a large continental icecap in British Columbia
- Monarch Mountain (British Columbia), a summit of the Pacific Ranges in British Columbia
- Monarch Mountain (Alberta), a peak in the Victoria Cross Ranges
- The Monarch (Canadian Rockies), a mountain

=== United States ===
- Monarch, Colorado
- Monarch, Montana
- Monarch, Virginia
- Monarch, West Virginia
- Monarch, Wyoming
- Monarch Lake, a reservoir in Colorado
- Monarch Mountain (ski area), Colorado
- Monarch Pass, Colorado

== Entertainment ==
=== Film ===
- Monarch (film), a 2000 British costume drama involving Henry VIII
- Monarch Film Corporation, a British film distribution company
- Monarch Films, an American production company owned by John R. Freuler
- Monarch, a fictional organization in the MonsterVerse film franchise
- HMS Monarch, a fictional Royal Navy warship from the 2017 film Pirates of the Caribbean: Dead Men Tell No Tales

=== Comics ===
- Monarch (comics), a DC Comics supervillain
- The Monarchy (comics), a Wildstorm comic

=== Music ===
- Monarch (American band), a Los Angeles indie electro-pop band
- Monarch (French band), a French drone doom band
- Monarchy (band), English synthpop duo
- Michael Monarch (born 1950), American guitarist
- The Monarch (production team), an American music production duo
- Monarch (Lay Your Jewelled Head Down), a 1999 album by Canadian singer Feist
- I, Monarch, 2005 album by Hate Eternal
- "Monarch" (song), a 2012 song by Delerium, featuring Nadina

=== Television ===
- Monarchy (TV series), a documentary television series about the British monarchy
- Monarch (American TV series), a 2022 American series about country music
- Monarch: The Big Bear of Tallac, an anime television series
- Monarch: Legacy of Monsters, a 2023 American TV series
- The Monarch, a villain on the animated television series The Venture Bros.

=== Video games ===
- Lord Monarch, a 1991 strategy war video game
- Monarch: The Butterfly King, a 2007 video game
- Monarch, the callsign of the player character from Project Wingman

== Ships ==
- HMS Monarch, several ships in the British Royal Navy
- Monarch (ship)
- MS Monarch (formerly Monarch of the Seas), a 1990 cruise ship
- Monarch-class coastal defense ships of the Austro-Hungarian Navy
  - SMS Monarch, the lead ship of the class
  - Ersatz Monarch-class battleships, cancelled replacement class
- CS Monarch, any of several cable-laying ships

== Sports ==
- Carolina Monarchs, a 1995–1997 Greensboro ice hockey team in the American Hockey League
- Dresden Monarchs, an American football club from Dresden, Germany
- Edinburgh Monarchs, a speedway team in Scotland
- Greensboro Monarchs, a 1989–1995 Carolina ice hockey team in the East Coast Hockey League
- Kansas City Monarchs, a former professional baseball team in Missouri, United States
- London Monarchs, a UK American football team in NFL Europe
- Manchester Monarchs (AHL), a 2001–2015 ice hockey team in New Hampshire, United States
- Manchester Monarchs (ECHL), a 2015–2019 ice hockey team in New Hampshire, United States
- Melbourne Monarchs, a team in the Australian Baseball League
- Methodist Monarchs, the athletic teams of Methodist University in Fayetteville, North Carolina
- Mimico Monarchs, a junior ice hockey team in Ontario, Canada
- Old Dominion Monarchs, the athletic teams from Old Dominion University in Virginia, United States
- Sacramento Monarchs, a former professional basketball team in California, United States
- Winnipeg Monarchs (disambiguation), various ice hockey teams from Winnipeg, Manitoba, Canada

== Vehicles ==
- Monarch (automobile), a car built in Detroit, Michigan, from 1913 to 1917
- Monarch (locomotive), a British articulated locomotive
- Monarch (marque), a Ford of Canada brand name
- Monarch (sternwheeler), an American steamboat
- Marske Monarch, a glider
- Mercury Monarch, a midsize American sedan built from 1975 to 1980
- MIT Monarch A, a 1983 American human-powered aircraft
- MIT Monarch B, a 1984 American human-powered aircraft
- Miles Monarch, a British light aeroplane of the 1930s
- The Butterfly Monarch, an American autogyro design

== Other uses ==
- Monarch (range), a brand for home appliances from the Malleable Iron Range Company
- Monarch (software), data capture and extraction software
- Monarch Airlines (1946–1950), an American airline
- Monarch Airlines (1967–2017), a British airline
- Monarch Beverage Company, a drink bottler in Atlanta, Georgia, United States
- Monarch Beverage, Inc., a drinks distributor in Indianapolis, Indiana, United States
- Monarch, a paper size
- Monarch High School (disambiguation), several schools

== See also ==
- Monarcha, a genus of bird in the Monarchinae subfamily
- Monach Islands, an uninhabited island group off the west coast of Scotland
- Monark, a Swedish bicycle
- Restaurant Monarh, a Dutch restaurant
- List of current monarchs
