= List of historical British telcos =

This list of historical British telcos is a list of telecommunications companies that either existed prior to British Telecom's (BT) privatisation, or, if created subsequently to BT's privatisation, took over telecoms networks that existed prior to the privatisation.

== BT and predecessors ==
These are the early British telecommunications companies that were nationalised by the British government, the nationalised government organisations that succeeded them, and the privatisation entity that in turn succeeded those.

=== Telegraph companies ===
Between 1846 and 1868, that is, from the formation of the first company until the announcement of nationalisation, 64 telegraph companies were formed. However, 68% of them failed, and only a handful of them grew to any significant size.

- Anglo-American Telegraph Company
- Bonelli's Electric Telegraph Company
- British and Irish Magnetic Telegraph Company
- British Electric Telegraph Company
- British Telegraph Company
- Eastern Telegraph Company
- Electric and International Telegraph Company
- Electric Telegraph Company
- English and Irish Magnetic Telegraph Company
- International Telegraph Company
- Irish Submarine Telegraph Company
- London District Telegraph Company
- Submarine Telegraph Company
- United Kingdom Telegraph Company
- Universal Private Telegraph Company

=== Telephone companies ===
- Corporation of Glasgow Telephone Department
- Edison Telephone Company of London Limited
- Lancashire and Cheshire Telephonic Exchange Company Limited
- London and Globe Telephone Maintenance Company
- National Telephone Company
- Northern District Telephone Company
- Telephone Company Limited (Bell's Patents)
- United Telephone Company
- Western Counties and South Wales Telephone Company

=== Nationalised successors ===
- General Post Office
- Post Office Telecommunications
- Post Office Corporation (Telecommunications division)
- British Telecom

=== Post-privatisation ===
- British Telecommunications plc

== Early BT competitors ==
- British Rail Telecommunications
- Cable and Wireless
- Energis
- Kingston Communications
- Mercury Telecommunications
- NTL
- Racal Telecom
- Vodafone

== See also ==
- BT Archives
- BT Museum
- Connected Earth
