= Monarch (ship) =

Several vessels have been named Monarch:

- Monarch (1799 ship) was launched at South Shields in 1799. She became a transport. In 1809 her owners had her lengthened. In 1816 she made a voyage to Batavia. Then in 1818 she carried migrants from Liverpool to Quebec. She was last listed in 1825.
- Monarch (1800 ship) was built at Quebec in 1800. She sailed to England, being captured and recaptured shortly before arriving. In England, under new ownership, she proceeded to make five voyages for the British East India Company (EIC) as an "extra ship", that is, under voyage charter. In 1813 she became a transport, and then in 1818 or so a regular merchantman. She was broken up in 1820.
- Monarch (1804 ship), of 318 tons (bm), was launched at Sunderland in 1804 as a West Indiaman. Monarch first appeared in Register of Shipping (RS) in 1806 with Ganock, master, Wake, owner, and trade London–Jamaica. Although her first voyages were to Jamaica, Monarch soon started trading with the Mediterranean, sailing as far as Constantinople. In October 1807 Lloyd's List reported that Monarch. Gamack, master, had been captured in the Mediterranean while sailing from Malta to Gibraltar and Lisbon.
- Monarch (1810 ship) was launched at Whitby in 1810. In 1813 her owners sold her to the Montrose New Whale Fishing Company. Between 1813 and 1839 she made 27 annual voyages to the northern whale fishery. She was last listed in 1838.
- Monarch (1814 ship) was launched at Whitby in 1814. She foundered north of the Shetland Islands in June 1828.
- MS Monarch (formerly Monarch of the Seas), a 1990 cruise ship

== See also ==
- CS Monarch, any of several cable-laying ships
- HMS Monarch – any one of five vessels of the British Royal Navy
- SMS Monarch – coastal defense ship of the Austro-Hungarian Navy
