= BT Archives =

Coordinates: 51.5180°N 0.1165°W

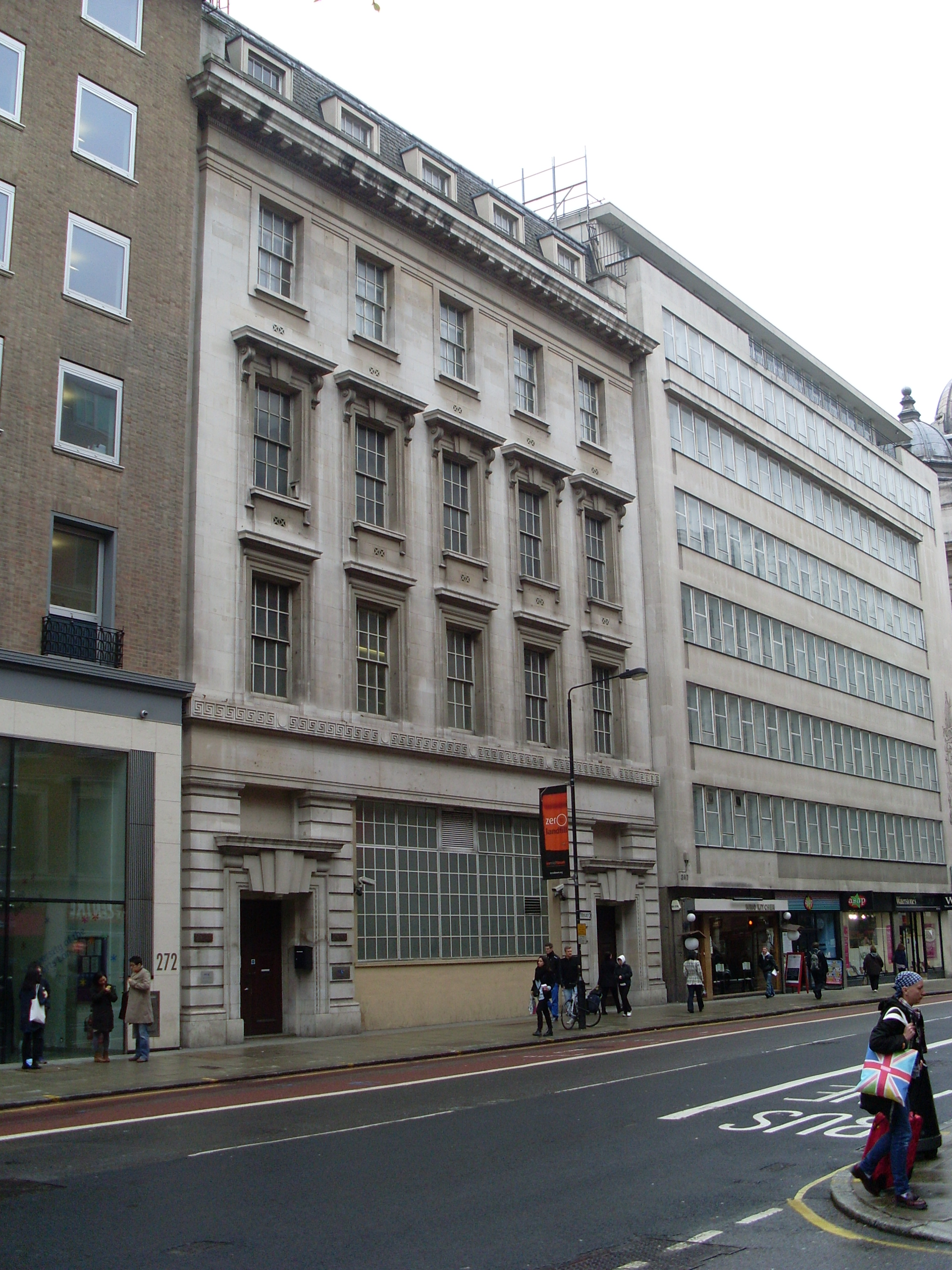
BT Archives

The BT Archives is an archive preserving the documentary heritage of the British telecoms company BT and its public sector predecessors. It is designated an official place of deposit for Public Records, for those records created prior to BT's privatisation in 1984.

The records include minutes, subject files, photographs, film and advertising material that tell the story of telecommunications in the UK and from the UK to overseas, from the formation of the private telegraph and telephone companies in the nineteenth century to the present day.

== Major historical collections ==
The earliest records held by BT Archives are those of the Electric Telegraph Company from 1846. Other private telegraph companies whose records are held are the British Electric Telegraph Company, International Telegraph Company, Submarine Telegraph Company, Electric and International Telegraph Company, British and Irish Magnetic Telegraph Company, London District Telegraph Company, United Kingdom Electric Telegraph Company, Universal Private Telegraph Company, Eastern Telegraph Company, British Telegraph Company, Irish Submarine Telegraph Company, English and Irish Magnetic Telegraph Company and the Anglo-American Telegraph Company. BT Archives also holds documents relating to the UK telegraph service of the British Post Office; the private companies being brought under the control of the Post Office in 1870.

BT Archives also holds records of the private telephone companies and of the Post Office telephone services. The private telephone companies represented are the Telephone Company Limited (Bell's Patents), Edison Telephone Company of London Limited, United Telephone Company, Lancashire and Cheshire Telephonic Exchange Company Limited, Northern District Telephone Company, National Telephone Company, Western Counties and South Wales Telephone Company, Corporation of Glasgow Telephone Department and London and Globe Telephone Maintenance Company.

Post Office Telecommunications activities continue concurrently and subsequently to the private telegraph and telephone companies. These are documented in the records of the Post Office telegraph and telephone service 1864-1969 and the Post Office Corporation (Telecommunications division) 1969-1981.

From 1 October 1981, British Telecommunications, trading as British Telecom, severed its links with the Post Office and became a totally separate public corporation. Records of British Telecommunications (public corporation) are held from 1981 until privatisation in 1984. Records after privatisation, of British Telecommunications plc 1984-2001, and of BT Group plc from 2001, continue to be preserved and made available for researchers in line with BT's heritage policy.

The British Phone Book collection is a major resource for genealogy and family history, containing a near-complete set of United Kingdom telephone directories from the first one issued in 1880. For preservation reasons the phone books are generally accessed on microfilm, and the phone books 1880-1984 are digitised and have been made available online.

BT Archives cares for more than 500,000 images and 1,000 film titles. Selected images can be found on BT Archives online image gallery.

== Location and access ==
BT Archives is based in Holborn Telephone Exchange on High Holborn in Central London and is open, by appointment, to public researchers on Wednesdays and Thursdays from 10:00am – 4:00pm. There is no access charge. Holborn was the first public automatic exchange in London in 1927, see Director telephone system.

Descriptions of the historic collections are available on the BT Archives online catalogue.

Full access, acquisition and preservation policies can be found on the BT Archives website

== Partnerships and governance ==
It is a partner in the Connected Earth network, the heritage initiative founded by BT in 2001 to safeguard telecommunications artefacts.

BT Archives and Connected Earth together form BT Heritage, part of BT's corporate responsibility programme.

== See also ==
- BT Museum
