= Universal Private Telegraph Company =

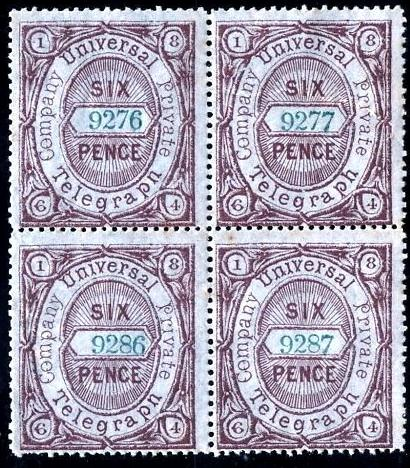
1864 telegraph stamps of the company used for paying telegraph fees.

The Universal Private Telegraph Company, Limited was formed in 1861 to exploit Professor Charles Wheatstone’s 1858 Universal Telegraph. The company was meant to "carry out a system by which banks, merchants, public bodies and other parties may have the means of establishing a telegraph for their own private purposes from their houses to their offices, manufactories or other places".

The company's first directors were Charles Wheatstone and William Fairbairn, CE, the Manchester ironmaster. It employed Thomas Page as the engineer, Lewis Hertslet as the secretary, and Nathaniel Holmes as the electrician.

== Archives ==
As a nationalised company, the firm's records are now in the British Telecom Archives.

== Stamps ==
The company issued a number of stamps which are of interest to philatelists and are still some of the most common British telegraph stamps found. It is unclear, however, whether the stamps were ever used as only unused copies are known of. The stamps mentioned the year in the corners.

== See also ==
- List of historical British telcos
