= London District Telegraph Company =

British telegraph company (1859–1867)

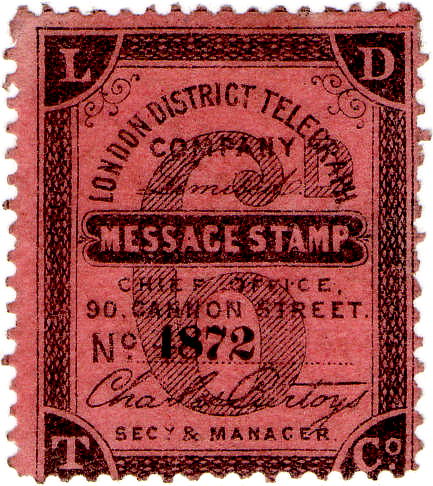
An 1865 stamp of the company.

The London District Telegraph Company was formed in 1859. It was renamed the London and Provincial Telegraph Company in 1867.

The management were connected with the British and Irish Magnetic Telegraph Company and the firm aimed to compete with the dominant Electric Telegraph Company in the London area. Its original Chairman was the banker and Member of Parliament Samuel Gurney (1816–1882). It used a combination of underground and overhead wires and saved money by avoiding the need for an Act of Parliament to authorise its activities. The overhead wires, however, required negotiation with individual households and landowners and were vulnerable to damage in bad weather. The firm employed many female clerks who were supervised by a "Matron" and "Sub Matrons".

In 1860 the company agreed with the Astronomer Royal to relay the Greenwich Observatory time-signal to all of its offices.

Despite an extensive network of lines in London, the company never made a net profit and only once an operating profit. It was acquired by the Postmaster General in the general nationalisation of private telegraph companies under the Telegraph Act 1868.

The company issued a number of telegraph stamps which are of interest to philatelists.

== See also ==
- List of historical British telcos
