= Bonelli's Electric Telegraph Company =

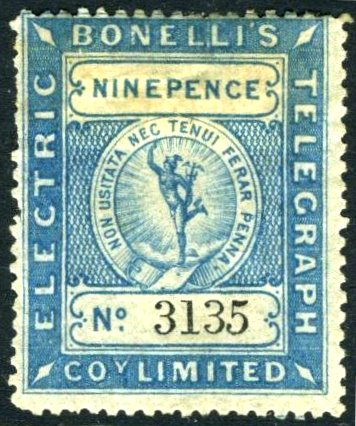
An 1861 stamp of Bonelli's Electric Telegraph Co. Ltd.

Bonelli's Electric Telegraph Co. Ltd. was formed in August 1860 by Henry Cook, an American, of 69 Lincoln's Inn Fields, London, and Eastbourne, with an initial capital of £25,000. The company was formed to exploit the telegraph system of Gaetano Bonelli of Italy, but the firm had limited success, and it failed in 1864.

The company issued a number of telegraph stamps which are of interest to philatelists. It is unclear, however, whether the stamps were ever used as only unused copies are known.

== See also ==
- List of historical British telcos
