= Langmead Collection =

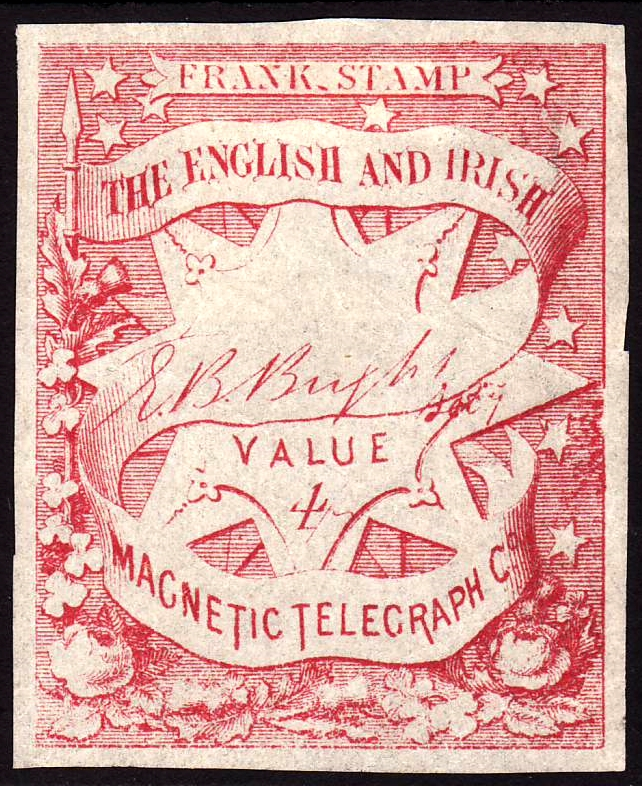
An 1857 stamp of the English & Irish Magnetic Telegraph Co. (not from the Langmead Collection).

The Langmead Collection is a collection of British and Irish telegraph stamps and stationery from 1851 to 1881 that forms part of the British Library Philatelic Collections. It was formed by Peter Langmead and received by the Library under the "in lieu of tax" scheme in 1991.
