= James Paxton (surgeon) =

British surgeon and writer

James Paxton (1786–1860) was a British surgeon and medical writer.

== Life ==
Paxton was born in London on 11 January 1786. He was admitted M.R.C.S., London, 16 March 1810, and was created M.D. of St. Andrews University 1845. For a time he acted as an army surgeon, but in 1816 took a practice at Long Buckley, Northamptonshire. Thence he removed to Oxford in 1821, where he had considerable success as a general practitioner. He was assistant-surgeon to the Oxfordshire militia. In 1843 he removed to a practice at Rugby, Warwickshire. A small estate was bequeathed to him in 1858 at Ledwell, a hamlet of the parish of Sandford St. Martin, seventeen miles from Oxford. There he died, at his residence, Ledwell House, after a very short illness, on 12 March 1860, and was buried in the churchyard at Sandford. He married Miss Anna Griffin, who died in 1864, and one of his two daughters married the Rev. Henry Highton, headmaster of Cheltenham College.

Paxton was a man of strong religious feelings, and was highly esteemed by his friends and patients.

== Writings ==
His writings had much success. Their titles are: 1. ‘Specimen of an Introduction to the Study of Human Anatomy,’ 1830. 2. ‘An Introduction to the Study of Human Anatomy,’ London, 1831, 8vo, 2 vols.; new edit. 1841. This book was republished in America, where it went through three editions. 3. ‘The Medical Friend; or Advice for the Preservation of Health,’ Oxford, 1843. 4. ‘Living Streams, or Illustrations of the Natural History and various Diseases of the Blood,’ London, 8vo, 1855. He contributed ‘A Case of Scirrhous Pylorus and Mortification of the Stomach’ to the ‘Edinburgh Medical and Surgical Journal,’ xv. 328, and edited Paley's ‘Natural Theology,’ with ‘a series of plates and explanatory notes,’ Oxford, 1826, 8vo, 2 vols.
