= Maria Craig =

British telegraphist

- Born: 1822; Dublin
- Died: 24 December 1905 (aged 82–83)
- Employer: Electric Telegraph Company (1853–1870); post office (1870–1883)

Maria Craig (1822–1905) was a Dublin born British telegraphist. She joined the Electric Telegraph Company in 1853 and rose to be a supervisor and then matron to the company's women employees. She was also an early woman employee of the Post Office after her employers were nationalised in 1870.

== Life ==
Craig was born in Dublin in 1822. She and her husband Robert Craig had at least four children. Robert seems to have died by 1853.

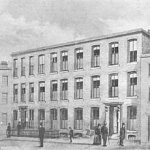
Electric Telegraph Company, Telegraph Street. Exterior in 1859

The Electric Telegraph Company was started in 1845. By 1859, growth required the company to relocate its central office to Great Bell Alley, Moorgate (now 11–14 Telegraph Street). The Moorgate office had three floors and a large number of men and boys were recruited on an accelerating rate of pay. The company also employed a significant number of women from a higher social class as telegraphists operating the Wheatstone needle instruments. They were paid less and they had to leave if they married.

Craig was employed by the Electric Telegraph Company in 1853 as a supervisor. In 1855 the company she was employed by merged with the International Telegraph Company and her new employer was the Electric and International Telegraph Company. By 1855 she was earning over £2 each week while her staff were paid between ten and fourteen shillings.

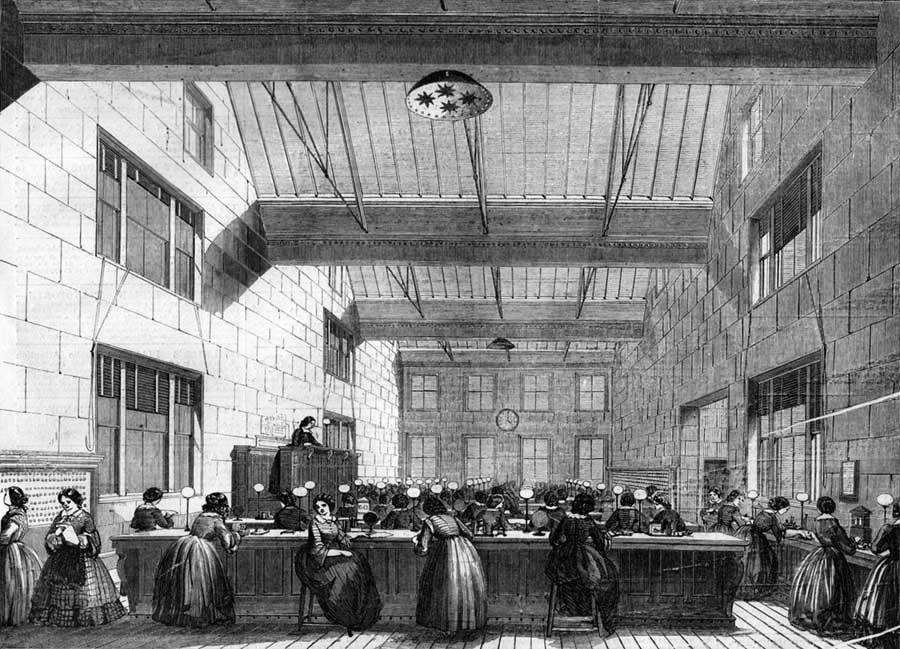
Supervising employees of the Electric Telegraph Company in Telegraph street in 1859

Frank Ives Scudamore was a civil servant tasked with looking at the country's telegraph service. His report mentions Mrs Craig as the "matron" looking after all the women employed at the central office. Most of the women employees were young and single and Craig was notably older and she had a child (and possibly more). Craig did not train the new employees; her matronly role was to look after them and ensure that they complied with the company's rules and expectations. The office operated around the clock and this was covered by three shifts: however only men and boys were allowed to work at night. The staff in her care were supervised to ensure that they gave their machines their prompt attention and in return they received bread, butter, tea, coffee and an area set aside for eating.

In January 1870 the British telegraph companies were nationalised and she and her 266 staff were employed by the General Post Office. By October of 1870 she was looking after 470 woman employees and she was given her own room. Scudamore never called her to give evidence and her role within the Post Office received little notice but he thanked her (and her staff) for their co-operation with his reorganisation. By 1874, the UK's new telegraph service had 3,600 offices and a turnover of £1m per annum.

In 1883 she retired, with a pension, giving up a salary of £250 per annum.

== Death and legacy ==
Maria Craig died in 1905 at her home in West Norwood. The site of her workplace is now occupied by The Telegraph public house.
