= Winnipeg Monarchs =

Winnipeg Monarchs is a name used by several Canadian ice hockey teams in Winnipeg, Manitoba and may refer to:

- Winnipeg Monarchs (senior), a defunct ice hockey team in the Manitoba Hockey Association from 1906–1936, 1935 World Ice Hockey Champions
- Winnipeg Monarchs (1930–1978), a defunct junior ice hockey team in the Manitoba Junior Hockey League from 1930–1978, 3-time Memorial Cup champions
- Winnipeg Monarchs (WHL), a defunct major junior ice hockey team in the Western Canada Hockey League from 1967–1977
- Winnipeg Monarchs (2025), an ice hockey team in the Manitoba Junior Hockey League (2020–present), formerly the Winnipeg Freeze
