= HMS Monarch =

Five ships of the Royal Navy have been named HMS Monarch.

- HMS Monarch (1747), 74-gun third-rate ship of the line, originally the French Monarque, captured 1747 at the second battle of Cape Finisterre, sold and broken up 1760. Admiral John Byng was executed on board in 1757.
- HMS Monarch (1765), 74-gun third rate; Vice Admiral Onslow's flagship at the Battle of Camperdown 1797; broken up 1813.
- HMS Monarch (1832), 84-gun second rate, broken up 1866.
- HMS Monarch (1868), ironclad masted turret ship, sold and broken up 1905.
- HMS Monarch (1911), Orion-class battleship, served in World War I, sunk as target 1925.

== Battle honours ==
- St. Vincent 1780
- St. Kitts 1782
- The Saints 1782
- Cape of Good Hope 1795
- Camperdown 1797
- Copenhagen 1801
- Baltic 1854
- Alexandria 1882
- South Africa 1899-1900
- Jutland 1916

== See also ==
- HMS Monarca
- SMS Monarch
