= BT Museum =

Coordinates: 51°30.7151′N 0°6.0734′W

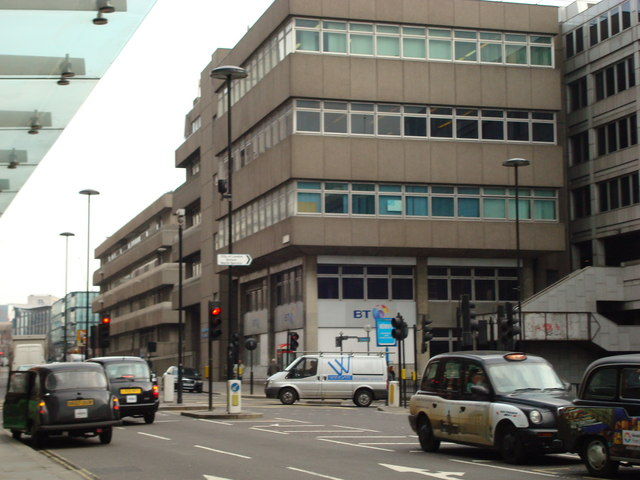
BT's offices at Baynard House, the former site of the BT Museum

The BT Museum was a telecommunications museum run by BT, that held artefacts and exhibits on the history of telecommunications in the United Kingdom. It was based in Baynard House in the Blackfriars district of London.

It was originally opened as the Telecom Technology Showcase in 1982.

It was closed to visitors in 1997, and was replaced in 2001 by the Connected Earth initiative.

== See also ==
- BT Archives
