= Connected Earth =

UK network of museums

Connected Earth was a UK network of organizations, primarily museums, that preserve the history of telecommunications in the UK.

Heritage artifacts are physically sent to Connected Earth partners and other institutions as appropriate, and are brought together again online through virtual galleries, searchable catalogues and educational resources at its website.

== Background ==
Connected Earth was founded by BT in 2001 and grew from its commitment to the UK's telecommunications heritage. By working with institutional partners, the network aimed to ensure that the UK's telecommunications heritage should be both accessible and assured for future generations.

== Partners ==
The Connected Earth partners were Amberley Museum & Heritage Centre, Avoncroft Museum of Historic Buildings, Bawdsey Radar, BT Archives, Goonhilly Satellite Earth Station, Milton Keynes Museum, Museum of London, Museum of Science and Industry Manchester (MoSI), Porthcurno Telegraph Museum, National Museums of Scotland, the Science Museum, the University of Salford, the Institute of Engineering and Technology and the Institute of Telecommunications Professionals. Partners will receive funding from BT for 10 years to help with hosting and management. Goonhilly Satellite Earth Station was a previous partner.

Each partner focused on a different aspect of telecommunications history. Five partners – Amberley, Avoncroft, Goonhilly, Museum of Science and Industry in Manchester and National Museum of Scotland – have hosted dedicated Connected Earth galleries, while others incorporate Connected Earth artefacts into their existing galleries.

== Collections ==
Together the Connected Earth partners aimed to tell the history of communications in the UK and from the UK to overseas. Through Connected Earth, artefacts as diverse as Hughes printing telegraph, electrophone table, the tuning coil from Rugby Radio Station, telephone kiosks, the first transatlantic telegraph cable, are preserved and accessible for visitors.

Partners continue to collect contemporary communications artefacts and work with other organisations to ensure that the history of communications is preserved.

Through People's Connected Earth, partners also collected stories and memories from the general public and people who worked in the industry.

== See also ==
- BT Museum
