= Henry Highton =

English schoolmaster, clergyman and writer (1816-74)

Henry Highton (1816–1874) was an English schoolmaster and clergyman, Principal of Cheltenham College, known also as a scientific and theological writer.

== Life ==
He was born at Leicester, the eldest son of Henry Highton. He spent five years at Rugby School, under Thomas Arnold, and matriculated at The Queen's College, Oxford, 13 March 1834. After leaving school, he continued on close terms with Arnold. Highton proceeded B.A. in 1837 (M.A. in 1840), obtaining a first-class in classics, and was Michel fellow of his college in 1840–1. At this period he was tutor to Henry John Stephen Smith, and curate of St Ebbe's Church, Oxford.

He was assistant-master at Rugby School from 1841 to 1859, and principal of Cheltenham College from the latter date till 1862. On 23 December 1874 he died at The Cedars, Putney, where he had resided for several years. He married a daughter of James Paxton.

== Works ==
A letter (5 April 1837) from Arnold to him on the religious duty of cultivating the intellect is printed in Arthur Stanley's Life of Arnold.

In 1842 Highton offered some advice as to the recovery of the "Israelitish nationality" in a printed letter addressed to Sir Moses Montefiore. An evangelical Christian, Highton saw signs of an imminent return of the Jews to Palestine.

In 1849 he published some sermons; in 1851 a ‘Catechism of the Second Advent;’ and in 1862 a revised translation of the New Testament. In 1863 appeared his ‘Letter to the Lord Bishop of London on the Repeal of the Act of Uniformity and the True Principles of Church Reform,’ criticising the Athanasian Creed, and the burial service. Highton's last theological work was ‘Dean Stanley and Saint Socrates, the Ethics of the Philosopher and the Philosophy of the Divine,’ 1873. It was an attack on Stanley when chosen select preacher to the university of Oxford for his ‘consistent opposition to evangelical truth.’

Highton also paid attention to practical physics, especially to the application of electricity to telegraphy. His approach from the 1840s was included in an 1852 book by his brother Edward Highton. This led to the gold-leaf telegraph, for which Henry Highton had an 1846 patent, and which was briefly in practical use; the rights to it had then been bought up by the Electric Telegraph Company. The brothers continued to work on the conduction problem for underwater telegraphic cables. On 1 May 1872 Henry Highton read before the Society of Arts a survey paper on ‘Telegraphy without Insulation,’ as a cheap means of international communication, in which he referred to a series of experiments with different lengths of wire dropped in the River Thames; the society conferred on Highton their silver medal for the paper. He afterwards read another on galvanic batteries; and letters of his were printed in the society's journal on Atlantic telegraphy, the science of energy, and other topics.

He also invented and patented an artificial stone which came into use for paving and building purposes. In 1873 Highton published a translation of some of Victor Hugo's poems.

=== Codes ===
The codes was as following

==== Code with two digits ====
E 1
T 3

O 11
N 13
I 31 
A 33

S 111
H 113
U 131
D 133

C 311 
F 313
L 331
R 333

P 1111
M 1113
B 1131
G  1133

V 1311
Q 1313
R 1331
W 1333

Y 3111
X 3113
Z 3131
J 3133

==== Improved code ====
A 2
E 3
C 4
T 6
M 8
.
I 11
D 12
H 21
N 22
O 33
L 36
F 44
Z 48
R 68
S 66
U 88
.
G 111
B 121
J 212
P 222
Y 333
K 363
Q 444
V 636
W 666
X 888
