= Monarch (1799 ship) =

British merchant ship 1799–1825

History

Great Britain
- Name: Monarch
- Builder: R & J Bulmer, South Shields
- Launched: 1799
- Fate: Last listed 1825

General characteristics
- Tons burthen: 1800: 442 (bm; 1809: 598 (bm)
- Armament: 1800: 6 × 4-pounder guns; 1806: 8 × 18-pounder carronades; 1809: 4 × 6-pounder guns + 8 × 18-pounder carronades

Monarch was launched at South Shields in 1799. She became a transport. In 1809 her owners had her lengthened. In 1816 she made a voyage to Batavia. Then in 1818 she carried migrants from Liverpool to Quebec. She was last listed in 1825.

Year	Master	Owner	Trade	Source & notes
1800	Thomson; J.Hall	Bulmer & Co.	Newcastle–London; London–Gibraltar	RS
1806	J.Hall	Bulmer & Co.	London transport	RS
1809	J.Hall; Jacques	Bulmer & Co.	Shields transport	RS; lengthened and thorough repair 1809
1815	Jacques; Symes	Bulmer & Co.	Shields transport Shields–London	RS; lengthened and thorough repair 1809, & repairs 1813
1816	Symes; Gascoin	Bulmer & Co.	Shields–London; Shields–Batavia	RS; lengthened and thorough repair 1809, & repairs 1813

In 1813 the British East India Company had lost its monopoly on the trade between India and Britain. British ships were then free to sail to India, the Indian Ocean, or south-east Asia under a licence from the EIC. Monarch made such a voyage, even though she does not appear in the most comprehensive list of such vessels, or in lists of vessels sailing under a licence.

On 16 May 1816, Monarch, Gascoyne, master, sailed from Portsmouth, bound for Batavia. From Batavia she sailed to Bengal, where she arrived on 1 February 1817. By 10 December she was at the Cape of Good Hope, having come from Bengal. On 5 January 1818 she arrived at St Helena, and the next day sailed for England. She arrived at Liverpool in late February, having lost her mizzenmast, sails, and boats in a gale off the Western Islands.

Year	Master	Owner	Trade	Source & notes
1818	Gascoin; Thornhill	Bulmer & Co.	Shields–Batavia; Liverpool–Quebec	RS; repairs 1815 & large repair 1816

On 16 August 1818, Monarch, Thornhill, master, arrived at Quebec with 50 settlers. The voyage from Liverpool had taken 66 days.

== Fate ==
Monarch continued to be listed until 1825, however she had not been surveyed since 1818, and Monarch, Thornhill, master, did not appear in Lloyd's List's ship arrival and departure data after 1818.
