= Monarh =

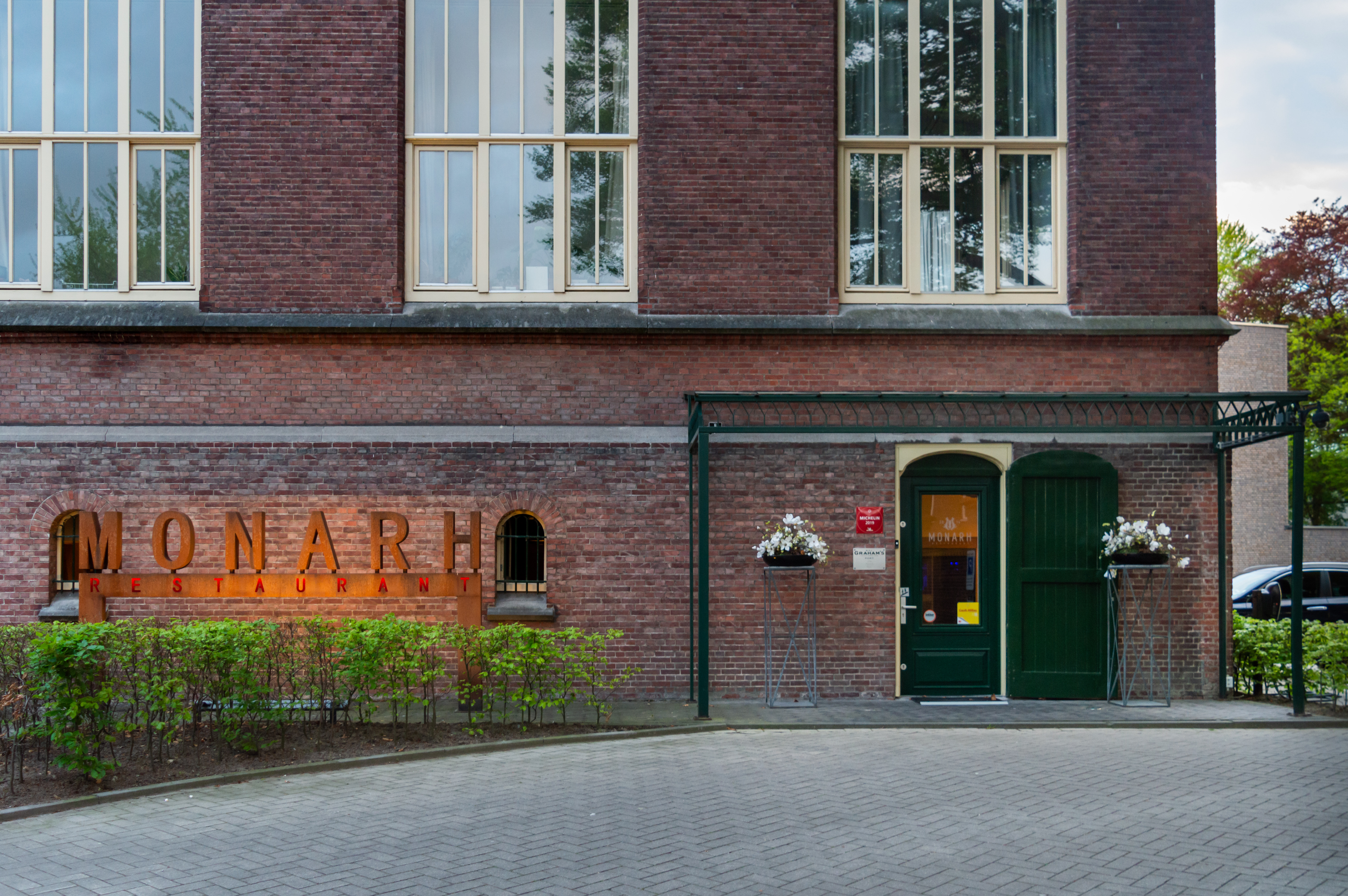
- The entrance on a Friday evening
- Interactive map of Monarh

Restaurant information
- Established: December 5, 2014
- Owner: Danny Kovacevic
- Chef: Paul Kappé
- Food type: French/International
- Rating: (Michelin Guide)
- Location: Bredaseweg 204-08, Tilburg, 5038 NK, Netherlands
- Coordinates: 51°33′20.0″N 5°04′10.5″E
- Seating capacity: 60
- Website: www.monarh.nl/en/

Monarh is a restaurant located in a former monastery in the Dutch city Tilburg. It received one Michelin star in the 2019 Michelin Guide and thus became the first such restaurant in Tilburg.

== History and location ==
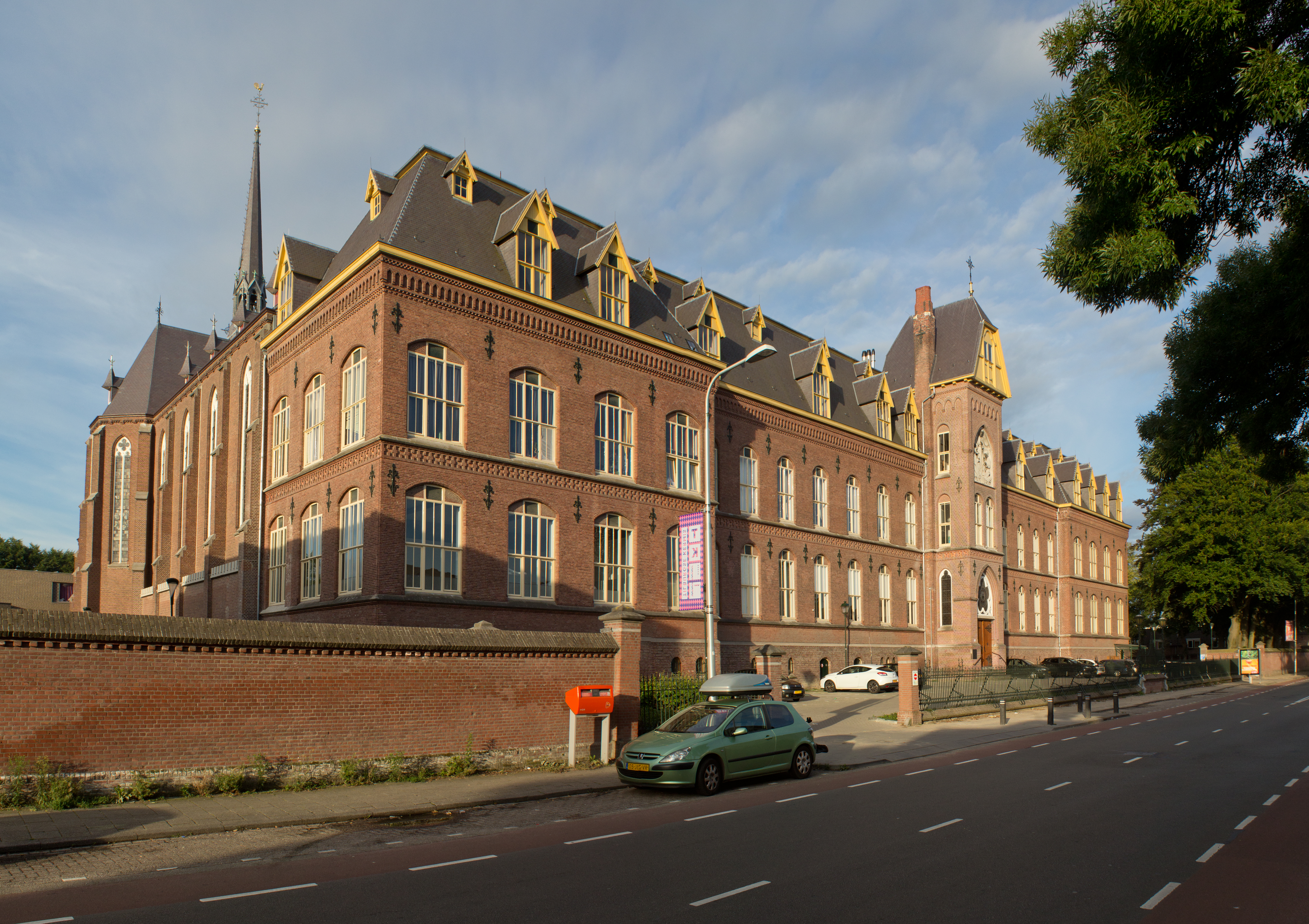
The former monastery, Missiehuis, in which Monarh is housed

Construction of Monarh started in 2013 in the former kitchen in the semi-basement of a monastery, called Missiehuis. That monastery was used by the Missionaries of the Sacred Heart (locally called "rooi harten", meaning "red hearts") since its completion in the 1890s. It was later designated as a rijksmonument and was sold in 2010 after its closure in order to be transformed into a residential and office complex. Monarh opened on December 5, 2014, and its name is a contraction of Monastère Rooi Harten.

The restaurant is owned by Danny Kovacevic, and the chef is Paul Kappé. His brother, Ralph Kappé, is the sommelier. Monarh serves both lunch and dinner, and the dishes belong to the French and international cuisines. The white interior of the restaurant is characterized by groin vaults, that are supported by square columns, and arch windows. Monarh has an open kitchen and an outdoor section and can seat over 60 people.

The restaurant received attention after announcing a floating amuse-bouche in 2016. This dish is served on a superconductor, that is cooled with liquid nitrogen and levitates above a magnet for up to three minutes due to the Meissner effect. Subsequently, the owner and chef made an appearance on the talk show RTL Late Night.

Monarh plans to open a second restaurant with a capacity of 150 in Plan-t, a planned office building in Spoorzone. The owner said that restaurant, that would offer breakfast, lunch, and dinner, is aimed to be more affordable and would have a more extensive menu.

== Reception ==
On December 17, 2018, Michelin announced at theater DeLaMar that Monarh was among the restaurants that would receive one star in the 2019 Michelin Guide. Head inspector Werner Loens called it a notable entrant in an interview with Misset Horeca and lauded the maturity of the recently opened restaurant. Restaurant guide Gault Millau gave Monarh a score of 14 out of 20, saying the chef cooks with courage and turns "every dish [into] a painting (...) and a feast". Monarh first appeared in the Lekker500, a list of 500 Dutch restaurants, in its 2018 edition. Mac van Dinther wrote a review for the newspaper de Volkskrant in 2015, describing the food as well-prepared and well-presented "but not extraordinarily creative".
