= British and Irish Magnetic Telegraph Company =

- Type: Public
- Industry: Telecommunications
- Founded: 1850
- Founder: John Watkins Brett
- Defunct: 1870
- Fate: Nationalised under the Telegraph Act 1868

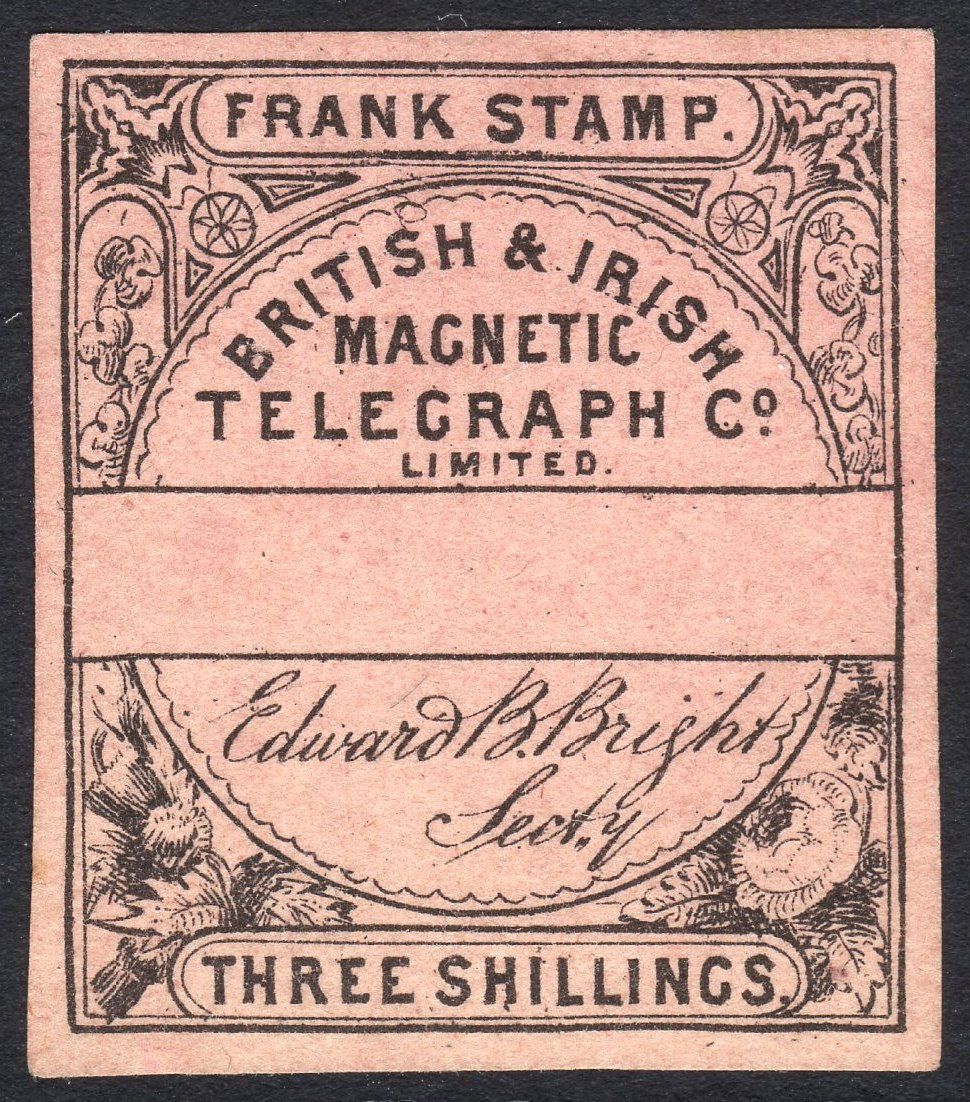
Company telegraph stamp

The British and Irish Magnetic Telegraph Company (also called the Magnetic Telegraph Company or the Magnetic) was a provider of telegraph services and infrastructure. It was founded in 1850 by John Brett. The Magnetic became the principal competitor to the largest telegraph company in the United Kingdom, Electric Telegraph Company (the Electric), and became the leading company in Ireland. The two companies dominated the market until the telegraph was nationalised in 1870.

The Magnetic's telegraph system differed from other telegraph companies. They favoured underground cables rather than wires suspended on poles. This system was problematic because of the limitations of insulation materials available at the time, but the Magnetic was constrained by the wayleaves owned by other companies on better routes. They were also unique in not using batteries which were required on other systems. Instead the operator generated the necessary power electromagnetically. The coded message was sent by the operator moving handles which moved coils past a permanent magnet thus generating telegraph pulses.

The Magnetic laid the first submarine telegraph cable to Ireland and developed an extensive telegraph network there. They had a close connection with the Submarine Telegraph Company and for a while had a monopoly on underwater, and hence, international communication. They also closely cooperated with the London District Telegraph Company who provided a cheap telegram service in London. The Magnetic was amongst the first to employ women as telegraph operators.

== Company history ==
Magnetic Telegraph Company's Act 1851
- Act of Parliament
- Parliament of the United Kingdom
- Long title: An Act for incorporating the Magnetic Telegraph Company, and to enable the said Company to Work certain Letters Patent.
- Citation: 14 & 15 Vict. c. cxviii

Dates
- Royal assent: 1 August 1851

Text of statute as originally enacted

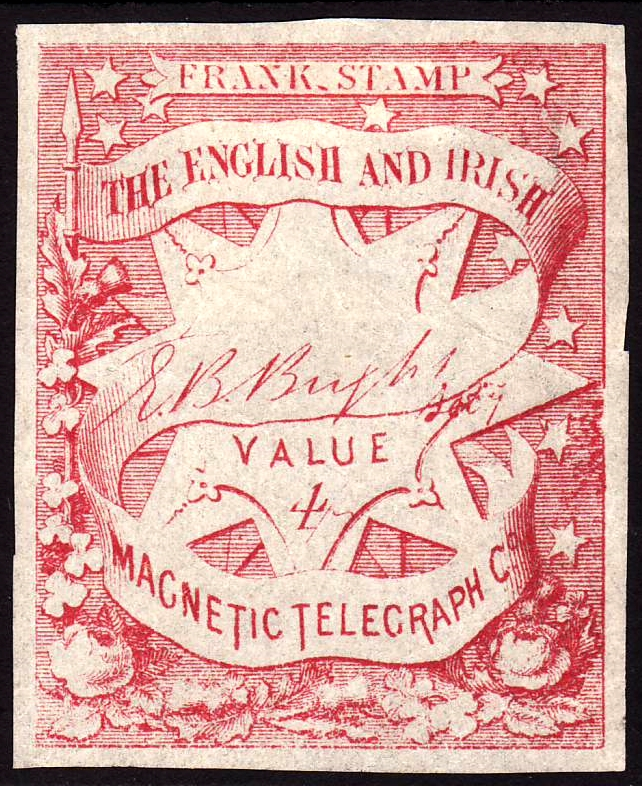
Stamp of the English and Irish Magnetic Telegraph Company

The English and Irish Magnetic Telegraph Company (which was also known as the Magnetic) was established by John Brett in 1850, and incorporated by the Magnetic Telegraph Company's Act 1851 (14 & 15 Vict. c. cxviii). John Pender also had an interest and Charles Tilston Bright was the chief engineer. The company's initial objective was to connect Britain with Ireland following the success of the Submarine Telegraph Company in connecting England with France with the first ocean cable to be put in service. The British and Irish Magnetic Telegraph Company was formed in 1857 (Note: Hills, p. 294, citing Barty-King, p. 11, says the date was 1856.) in Liverpool through a merger of the English and Irish Magnetic Telegraph Company and the British Telegraph Company (originally known as the British Electric Telegraph Company).

The main competitor of the Magnetic was the Electric Telegraph Company, later, after a merger, the Electric and International Telegraph Company (the Electric for short) founded by William Fothergill Cooke. By the end of the 1850s, the Electric and Magnetic companies were virtually a cartel in Britain. In 1859, the Magnetic moved its headquarters from Liverpool to Threadneedle Street in London, in recognition that they were no longer a regional company. They shared these premises with the Submarine Telegraph Company.

The company had a close relationship with the Submarine Telegraph Company who laid the first cable to France and many subsequent submarine telegraph cables to Europe. From about 1857, the Magnetic had an agreement with them that all their submarine cables were to be used only with the landlines of the Magnetic. The Magnetic also had control of the first cable to Ireland. This control of international traffic gave them a significant advantage in the domestic market.

Another company with a close relationship was the London District Telegraph Company (the District), formed in 1859. The District provided a cheap telegram service within London only. They shared headquarters and directors with the Magnetic. The Magnetic installed their lines and trained their staff in return for the District passing on traffic for the Magnetic outside London.

The Magnetic founded its own press agency. It promoted its agency by offering lower rates to customers who used it than the rates for customers who wanted connections to rival agencies. In 1870, The Magnetic, along with several other telegraph companies including the Electric, were nationalised under the Telegraph Act 1868 and the company wound up.

== Telegraph system ==
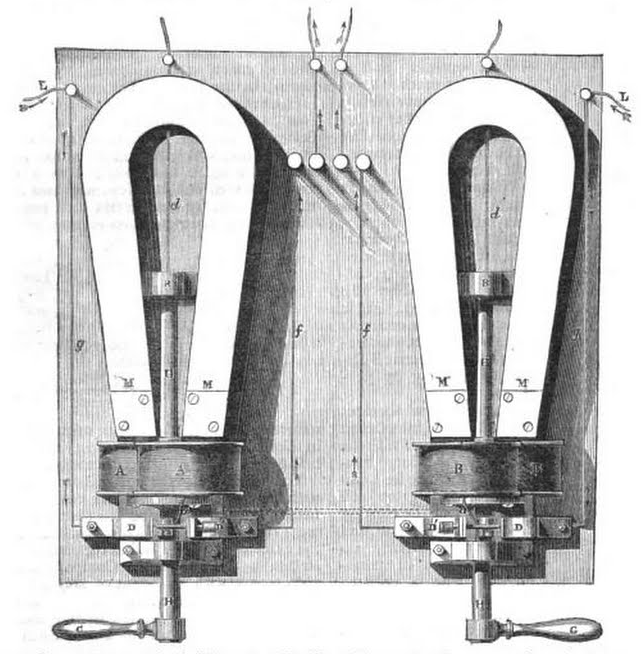
Plan view of the Henley and Foster two-needle telegraph

The telegraph system of the Magnetic was somewhat different from other companies. This was largely because the Electric held the patents for the Cooke and Wheatstone telegraph. The name of the company refers to the fact that their telegraph system did not require batteries. Power for the transmissions was generated electromagnetically. The system, invented by William Thomas Henley and George Foster in 1848, was a needle telegraph and came in double-needle or single-needle versions. The machine was worked by the operator pushing pedal keys. An armature connected to the key moved two coils through the magnetic field of a permanent magnet. This generated a pulse of current which caused a deflection of the corresponding needle at both ends of the line. The needles were magnetised and so arranged that they were held in position by the permanent magnet after deflection. The operator was able to apply a current in the reverse direction so that there were two positions that the needle could be held in. The code consisted of various combinations of successive needle deflections to the left or right.

In later years, the Magnetic used other telegraph systems. After the takeover of the British Telegraph Company, the Magnetic acquired the rights to the needle telegraph instrument of that company's founder, Henry Highton. This instrument was the cheapest of any of the instruments produced at the time, but like all needle telegraphs, was slower than audible systems due to the operator having to continually look up at the instrument while transcribing the message. Some companies moved to needle instruments with endstops making two different sounds when the needle struck them (an innovation of Cooke and Wheatstone in 1845) to solve this problem. The Magnetic instead used an 1854 invention of Charles Tilston Bright on its more busy lines. This was the acoustic telegraph (not to be confused with the acoustic telegraphy method of multiplexing) known as Bright's bells. In this system, two bells placed either side of the operator are rung with a hammer made to strike the bell by a solenoid driven by a relay. They are so arranged that the right and left bells are struck according to whether a positive or negative pulse of current is received on the telegraph line. Such bells make a much louder sound than the clicking of a needle.

The Magnetic found a method of overcoming the problem of dispersion on long submarine telegraph cables. The poorly understood phenomenon at that time was called retardation because different parts of a telegraph pulse travels at different speeds on the cable. Part of the pulse appears to be 'retarded', arriving later than the rest at the destination. This 'smearing out' of the pulse interferes with neighbouring pulses making the transmission unintelligible unless messages are sent at a much slower speed. The Magnetic found that if they generated pulses of opposite polarity to the main pulse and slightly delayed from it, the retarded signal was sufficiently cancelled to make the line usable at normal operator speeds. This system was developed theoretically by William Thomson and demonstrated to work by Fleeming Jenkin.

The Magnetic played a part in solving the dispersion problem on the transatlantic telegraph cable of the Atlantic Telegraph Company. Magnetic were strongly connected with this project; Bright promoted it and shares were sold largely to Magnetic shareholders, including Pender. Dispersion on the 1858 Atlantic cable had been so severe that it was almost unusable: it was destroyed by misguided attempts to solve the problem using high voltage. For the 1866 cable, it was planned to use the Magnetic's opposite polarity pulse method, but doubts were expressed over whether it would work over such a great distance. Magnetic connected together various of their British underground cables to provide a total line length of over 2,000 miles (3,200 km) for proof of principle testing. Dispersion was not eliminated from submarine cables until loading coils started to be used on them from 1906 onwards.

== Telegraph network ==
=== First connection to Ireland ===
The company's first objective, in 1852, was to provide the first telegraph service between Great Britain and Ireland by means of a submarine cable between Portpatrick in Scotland and Donaghadee in Ireland. The cable core was gutta-percha insulated copper wire made by the Gutta Percha Company. This was armoured with iron wires by R. S. Newall and Company at their works in Sunderland. Before this could be achieved, two other companies attempted to be the first to make the connection across the Irish Sea.

Despite having the contract to lay the Magnetic company's cable, Newall also secretly constructed another cable at their Gateshead works with the intention of being first to get a telegraph connection to Ireland. This Newall cable was only lightly armoured with an open 'bird-cage' structure of the iron wires, there was no cushioning layer between the core and the armour, and the insulation was not properly tested before laying because of the great hurry to get the job done before Magnetic was ready. This cable was laid from Holyhead in Wales to Howth, near Dublin with William Henry Woodhouse as engineer, and thence to Dublin via underground cable along the railway line. Laying of the submarine cable was completed on 1 June 1852 by the City of Dublin Steam Packet Company's chartered paddle steamer Britannia of 1825, usually used as a cattle ship, and with assistance from the Admiralty with HMS Prospero. (Note: Haigh, p. 36, describes Britannia as a 254 ton barque with an added steam engine, built in 1827 at Yarmouth; no source to support this has been found.) However, the cable failed a few days later and was never put into service. (Note: Huurdeman, p. 129, credits the laying of this cable to the Magnetic Company.)

In July of the same year, the Electric Telegraph Company of Ireland tried using an insulated cable inside a hemp rope on the Portpatrick to Donaghadee route. This construction proved problematic because it floated (the Submarine Telegraph Company's Dover to Calais cable in 1850 was also lightweight, having no protection at all other than the insulation, but they had taken the precaution of adding periodic lead weights to sink the cable). It was laid from a schooner Reliance, assisted by tugs. The strong sea currents in the Irish Sea, much deeper than the English Channel, dragged the cable into a large bow and there was consequently insufficient length to land it. The attempt was abandoned.

For their cable, Magnetic were more careful in testing the insulation of batches of cable than Newall. Coils of cable were hung over the side of the dock and left to soak before testing. They used a new type of battery for insulation testing that was capable of being used at sea. Previously, the test batteries had been lined wooden cases with liquid electrolyte (Daniell cells). The new 'sand battery' comprised a moulded gutta-percha case filled with sand saturated with electrolyte, making it virtually unspillable. 144 cells were used in series (around 150 V). Several suspect portions of insulation were removed and repaired, by opening up the iron wire armouring with Spanish windlasses. Newall attempted to lay the Sunderland-made cable, again using the chartered steamer Britannia, in the autumn of 1852. The cable was too taut as she sailed from Portpatrick, resulting in the test instruments being dragged into the sea. Several delays caused by broken iron wires as the cable was laid, resulted in the ship drifting off course and running out of cable and this attempt too was abandoned.

Magnetic were successful with a new cable in 1853 over the same route, with Newall this time using the chartered Newcastle collier William Hutt. This was a six-core cable and heavier than the 1852 cable, weighing seven tons per mile. At over 180 fathoms (330 m) down, it was the deepest cable laid to that date. Repairs to the cable in 1861 required 128 splices. Tests on pieces of retrieved cable found that the copper wire used was very impure, containing less than 50% copper, despite the Gutta Percha Company specifying 85%.

=== Land network ===
The Magnetic's network was centred on northern England, Scotland, and Ireland, with its headquarters in Liverpool. Like most other telegraph companies, it ran its major telegraph trunk lines along railways in its home area. One of their first lines was ten unarmoured wires buried in the space between two railway tracks of the Lancashire and Yorkshire Railway. The Magnetic developed an extensive underground cable network from 1851 onwards. This was in contrast to other companies who used wires suspended between telegraph poles, or in built up areas, from rooftop to rooftop. Partly, the Magnetic buried cables for better protection from the elements. However, a more pressing reason was that many railway companies had exclusive agreements with the Electric, which shut out the Magnetic. Further, the British Telegraph Company, had exclusive rights for overhead lines on public roads, and the United Kingdom Telegraph Company had exclusive rights along canals. The Magnetic had a particular problem in reaching London. Their solution was to run buried cables along major roads. Ten wires were installed in this way along the route London–Birmingham–Manchester–Glasgow–Carlisle.

Wires on poles do not need to be electrically insulated (although they may have a protective coating). This is not so with underground lines. These must be insulated from the ground and from each other. The insulation must also be waterproof. Good insulating materials were not available in the early days of telegraphy, but after William Montgomerie sent samples of gutta-percha to Europe in 1843, the Gutta Percha Company started making gutta-percha insulated electrical cable from 1848 onwards. Gutta-percha is a natural rubber that is thermoplastic, so is good for continuous processes like cable making. Synthetic thermoplastic insulating material was not available until the invention of polyethylene in the 1930s, and it was not used for submarine cables until the 1940s. On cooling, gutta-percha is hard, durable, and waterproof, making it suitable for underground (and later submarine) cables. This was the cable chosen by the Magnetic for its underground lines.

In Ireland too, the Magnetic developed an extensive network of underground cables. In 1851, in anticipation of the submarine cable connection being laid to Donaghadee, the Magnetic laid an underground cable to Dublin. Once the submarine link was in place, Dublin could be connected to London via Manchester and Liverpool. In the west of Ireland, by 1855 they had laid cables that stretched down the entire length of the island on the route Portrush–Sligo–Galway–Limerick–Tralee–Cape Clear. The relationship of the Magnetic with Irish railway companies was the exact opposite of that in Britain. The Magnetic obtained exclusive agreements with many railways, including in 1858 with the Midland Great Western Railway. In Ireland, it was the Electric's turn to be forced on to the roads and canals.

In 1856, the Magnetic discovered that the insulation of cables laid in dry soil was deteriorating. This was due to the essential oils in the gutta-percha evaporating, leaving just a porous, woody residue. Bright tried to overcome this by reinjecting the oils, but with limited success. This problem was the main driver for acquiring the unprofitable British Telegraph Company—so that the Magnetic inherited their overhead cable rights. From this point, the Magnetic avoided laying new underground cables except where it was essential to do so.

== Atlantic cable ==
Brett started the fundraising for the Atlantic Telegraph Company's project to build the transatlantic telegraph cable at the Magnetic's Liverpool headquarters in November 1856. Brett was one of the founders of this company and the Magnetic's shareholders were inclined to invest because they expected that the transatlantic traffic would mean more business for the Magnetic's Irish lines. This was because the landing point for the cable was in Ireland and traffic would therefore have to pass through the Magnetic's lines.

== Social issues ==
The Magnetic was an early advocate of employing women as telegraph operators. They were paid according to the speed with which they could send messages, up to the maximum of ten shillings per week when 10 wpm was achieved. It was a popular job with unmarried women who otherwise had few good options.

== Bibliography ==
- Ash, Stewart, "The development of submarine cables", ch. 1 in, Burnett, Douglas R.; Beckman, Robert; Davenport, Tara M., Submarine Cables: The Handbook of Law and Policy, Martinus Nijhoff Publishers, 2014 ISBN 9789004260320.
- Barty-King, Hugh, Girdle Round the Earth: The Story of Cable and Wireless and Its Predecessors to Mark the Group's Jubilee, 1929–1979, London: Heinemann, 1979 OCLC 6809756, ISBN 0434049026.
- Bowers, Brian, Sir Charles Wheatstone FRS: 1802-1875, Institution of Electrical Engineers, 2001 ISBN 0852961030.
- Beauchamp, Ken, History of Telegraphy, Institution of Engineering and Technology, 2001 ISBN 0852967926.
- Bright, Charles Tilston, Submarine Telegraphs, London: Crosby Lockwood, 1898 OCLC 776529627.
- Bright, Edward Brailsford; Bright, Charles, The Life Story of the Late Sir Charles Tilston Bright, Civil Engineer, Cambridge University Press, 2012 ISBN 1108052886 (first published 1898).
- Cookson, Gillian, A Victorian Scientist and Engineer: Fleeming Jenkin and the Birth of Electrical Engineering, Ashgate, 2000 ISBN 0754600793.
- Hagen, John B., Radio-Frequency Electronics, Cambridge University Press, 2009 ISBN 052188974X.
- Haigh, Kenneth Richardson, Cableships and Submarine Cables, Adlard Coles, 1968 OCLC 497380538.
- Hills, Jill, The Struggle for Control of Global Communication, University of Illinois Press, 2002 ISBN 0252027574.
- Hunt, Bruce J., The Maxwellians, Cornell University Press, 2005 ISBN 0801482348.
- Huurdeman, Anton A., The Worldwide History of Telecommunications, Wiley, 2003 ISBN 0471205052.
- Kieve, Jeffrey L., The Electric Telegraph: A Social and Economic History, David and Charles, 1973 OCLC 655205099.
- Mercer, David, The Telephone: The Life Story of a Technology, Greenwood Publishing Group, 2006 ISBN 031333207X.
- Morse, Samuel, "Examination of the Telegraphic Apparatus and the Processes in Telegraphy", in, Blake, William Phipps (ed), Reports of the United States Commissioners to the Paris Universal Exposition, 1867, vol. 4, US Government Printing Office, 1870 OCLC 752259860.
- Newell, E.L., "Loading coils for ocean cables", Transactions of the American Institute of Electrical Engineers, Part I: Communication and Electronics, vol. 76, iss. 4, pp. 478–482, September 1957.
- Roberts, Steven, Distant Writing, distantwriting.co.uk,
  - ch. 5, "Competitors and allies", archived 1 July 2016.
- Shaffner, Taliaferro Preston, The Telegraph Manual, Pudney & Russell, 1859.
- Shaffner, Taliaferro Preston, "Magneto-electric battery", Shaffner's Telegraph Companion, vol. 2, pp. 162–167, 1855 OCLC 191123856. See also, Catalogue of the Special Loan Collection of Scientific Apparatus at the South Kensington Museum, p. 301, 1876.
- Smith, Willoughby, The Rise and Extension of Submarine Telegraphy, London: J.S. Virtue & Co., 1891 OCLC 1079820592.
- Wheen, Andrew, Dot-Dash to Dot.Com: How Modern Telecommunications Evolved from the Telegraph to the Internet, Springer, 2011 ISBN 1441967605.
- "The progress of the telegraph: part VII", Nature, vol. 12, pp. 110–113, 10 June 1875.
