= Monarch High School =

Monarch High School can refer to several different schools:

- Monarch School (San Diego) in California
- Monarch High School (Colorado)
- Monarch High School (Florida)
- The Monarch School (in Texas)
- Monarch School, Montana (Closed)
