= CS Monarch =

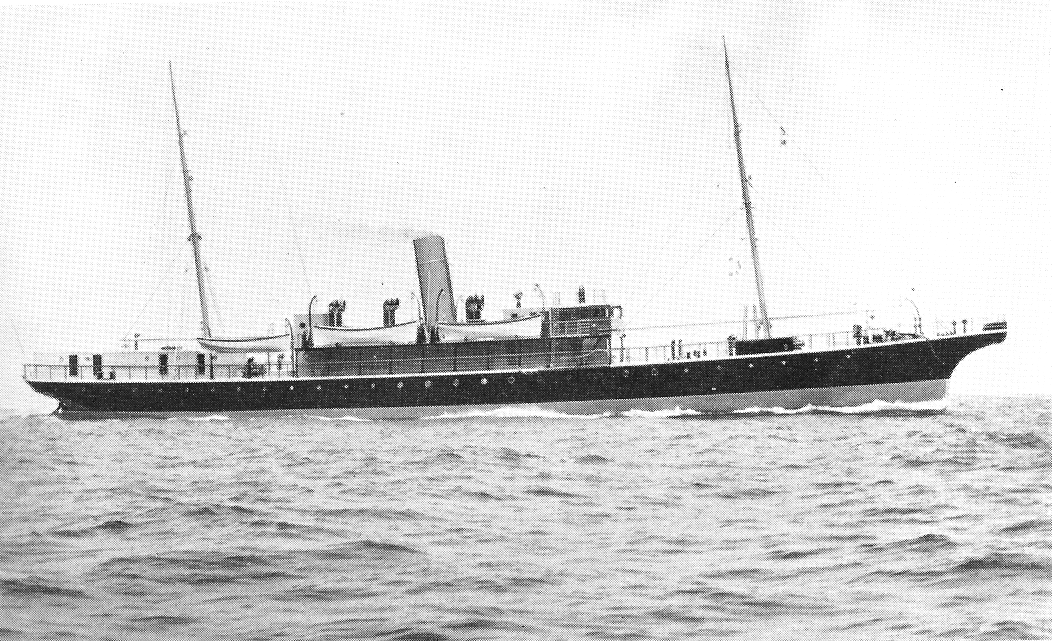
CS Monarch (1916)

Five cable-laying ships have been named CS Monarch, or, after the nationalisation of British telegraph companies, HMTS Monarch:

- CS Monarch (1830), a paddle steamer built in 1830, used as a cable ship by Electric Telegraph Company from 1853 onwards.
- HMTS Monarch (1883), built in 1883 for the Post Office. Sunk 1915 off Folkestone in World War I.
- HMTS Monarch (1916), built in 1916 as a replacement for CS Alert but named Monarch after the 1915 sinking. Badly damaged by friendly fire from an American ship during the Normandy landings (Monarch was tasked with providing a telephone connection to France). Sunk by U-boat off Folkestone 16 April 1945 after repairing a cable to the Netherlands.
- HMTS Monarch (1945), launched in 1945 and completed in 1946 she was renamed HMTS Sentinel in 1970 and broken up in 1977.
- HMTS Monarch (1973), launched in 1973 and broken up in 2003.

== See also ==
- Monarch (disambiguation)#Ships, for other ships named Monarch
