= Telegraph stamp =

Stamp for the prepayment of telegraph fees

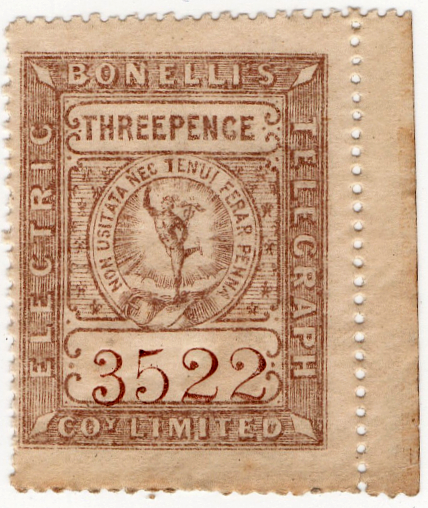
A stamp of Bonelli's Electric Telegraph Co. Ltd, issued around 1862

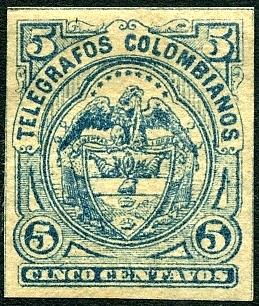
Colombia, 1886 telegraph stamp

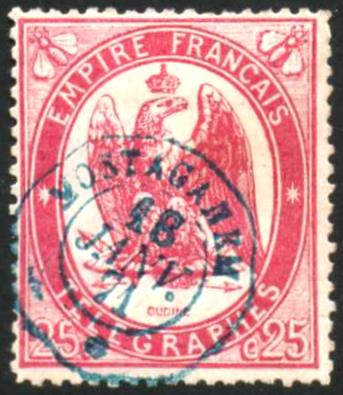
A French telegraph stamp used in 1871

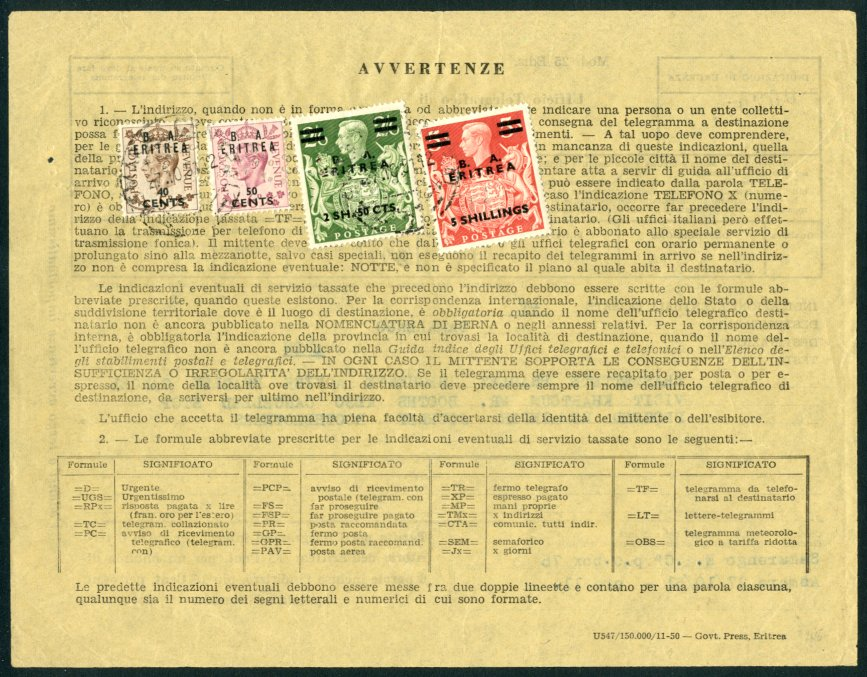
The reverse of a telegram from Eritrea showing British postage stamps (overprinted for use in Eritrea) used to pay the fee

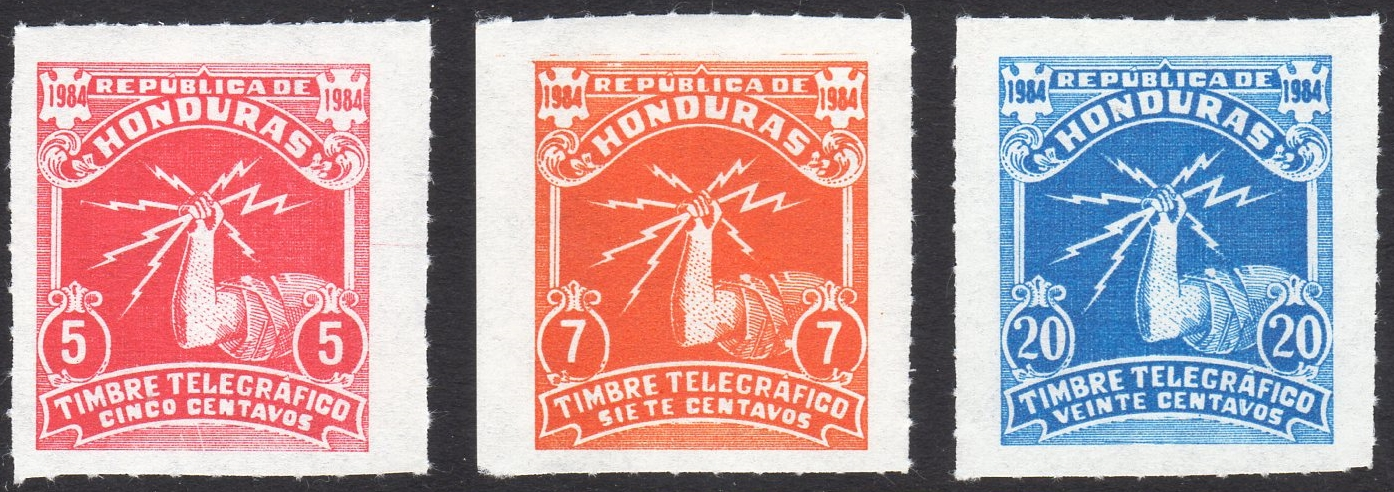
Three 1984 telegraph stamps from Honduras, some of the last telegraph stamps issued anywhere

Telegraph stamps are stamps intended solely for the prepayment of telegraph fees. The customer completed a telegraph form before handing it with payment to the clerk who applied a telegraph stamp and cancelled it to show that payment had been made. If the stamp was an imprinted stamp, it formed part of the message form.

== Usage ==
In most countries, the cost of sending a telegram was paid using normal postage stamps. These can often be identified by their distinctive telegraphic cancels or punched holes. In some countries and at some times, special telegraph stamps were produced or postage or revenue stamps overprinted to pay the fee (e.g. Nicaragua, Ecuador). Private companies also issued telegraph stamps in countries where the telegraph network was in private ownership.

The first telegraph stamps issued might be those of the English and Irish Magnetic Telegraph Company, released in 1853. The first government-issued telegraph stamps were issued in India in January 1860.

Occasionally postage stamps ran out and telegraph stamps were used for letter postage as an emergency measure, for example in Spain in 1879.

== Collecting ==
Telegraph stamps are regarded by many philatelists as collectable. They are listed in most country-specific catalogues, though not usually in general stamp catalogs. The French Yvert & Tellier and the latest [when?] Stanley Gibbons catalog of British Commonwealth stamps do list these stamps. Telegraph and Telephone Stamps of the World by S.E.R. Hiscocks (1982) and Telegraph Stamps of the World by John Barefoot (2013) are the only catalogues which list worldwide telegraph stamps. American telegraph stamps are also listed and described in detail in United States Telegraph Stamps and Franks by George Jay Kramer. The first American telegraph stamps were issued by the New York City and Suburban Printing Telegraph Co., probably in 1859.

The Royal Philatelic Collection of Queen Elizabeth II has many telegraph stamps as George V was an enthusiastic collector. It includes examples of British and Commonwealth stamps as well as private companies such as Bonelli's Electric Telegraph Co. Ltd., the Electric Telegraph Company and the British and Irish Magnetic Telegraph Company.

== The Stock Exchange forgery ==
One sideline to the story of telegraph stamps is the Stock Exchange forgery of 1872–73, which was discovered in 1898 by Charles Nissen when examining used stamps from telegraph forms. The stamps were found to be forged due to the absence of a watermark and because they had impossible corner lettering. It is believed that a clerk in the Stock Exchange Post Office, London had been using forged one shilling green stamps on the forms instead of genuine stamps and keeping the fees. The culprit was never identified, but examples of the forgery are now sold for many times the price of the genuine stamps.

== Demise ==
The telegraph was superseded by the fax, email, and mobile telephone text messages. The last telegraph stamps are thought to have been issued in 1993 by Honduras.

== See also ==
- Cinderella stamp
- Langmead Collection
- Walter Morley
