= Taliaferro Preston Shaffner =

Colonel Taliaferro Preston Shaffner (1811 in Smithfield, Virginia – December 11, 1881 in Troy, New York) was an American inventor and entrepreneur who promoted telegraphy during its infancy.

An associate of Samuel Morse, Shaffner published Shaffner's Telegraph Companion, a monthly journal devoted to Morse's telegraphy, from 1854 to 1855. The Companion published articles on the history, theory, and practice of telegraphy, as well as United States Supreme Court opinions regarding Morse's patent disputes over the telegraph and Morse's own legal deposition regarding his claim to priority.

In 1851, Shaffner built a telegraph line from St. Louis, Missouri to Jefferson City. Later, he organized the North Atlantic Telegraph Company, which projected building a line from Labrador to England through Greenland, Iceland, and the Faroe Islands. An advantage of Shaffner's proposal was that none of its segments extended below water for more than 800 miles. The British government took some interest in the project, but doubts about the long cable's feasibility undermined its funding, and the line was never built.

Shaffner was chiefly self-taught. He studied law and was admitted to the bar but mainly pursued inventing. Shaffner invented several methods of blasting with nitroglycerine and other high explosives for which he received twelve patents. In 1864, he served Denmark in the Second Schleswig War. He wrote histories of the United States Civil War and was active in the Independent Order of Odd Fellows.
