= SMS Monarch =

Austro-Hungarian Navy's Monarch-class coastal defense ship

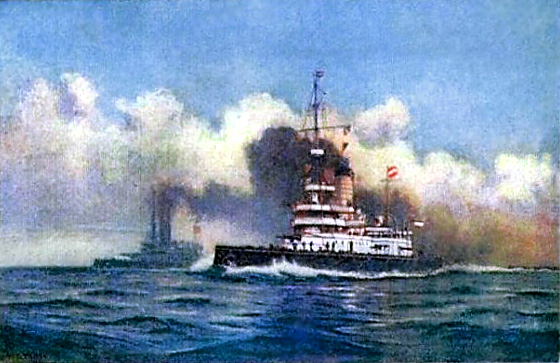
- A painting showing SMS Wien and the other ships of the Monarch class on maneuvers

History

Austro-Hungarian Empire
- Name: SMS Monarch
- Ordered: May 1892
- Builder: Pola Naval Arsenal
- Laid down: 31 July 1893
- Launched: 9 May 1895
- Sponsored by: Archduchess Maria Theresa
- Commissioned: 11 May 1898
- Decommissioned: 14 March 1918
- Fate: Scrapped, 1921

General characteristics
- Class & type: Monarch-class coastal defense ship
- Displacement: 5,785 tonnes (5,694 long tons) (full load)
- Length: 99.22 m (325 ft 6 in)
- Beam: 17 m (55 ft 9 in)
- Draught: 6.4 m (21 ft 0 in)
- Installed power: 8,600 ihp (6,400 kW); 5 × cylindrical boilers
- Propulsion: 2 × Shafts; 2 × Vertical triple-expansion steam engines
- Speed: 17.5 knots (32.4 km/h; 20.1 mph)
- Range: 3,500 nmi (6,500 km; 4,000 mi) @ 9 knots (17 km/h; 10 mph)
- Complement: 26 officers and 397 enlisted men
- Armament: 2 × 2 - 240 mm (9.4 in) Krupp guns; 6 × 1 - 150 mm (5.9 in) Škoda guns; 1 × 1 - 66 mm (2.6 in) Škoda L/45 BAG gun; 2 × 66 mm (2.6 in) L/18 landing guns; 10 × 1 - 47 mm (1.9 in) Škoda guns; 4 × 1 - 47 mm (1.9 in) Hotchkiss guns; 2 × 450 mm (17.7 in) torpedo tubes
- Armour: Waterline belt: 120–270 mm (4.7–10.6 in); Deck: 40 mm (1.6 in); Gun turrets: 250 mm (9.8 in); Casemate: 80 mm (3.1 in); Conning tower: 220 mm (8.7 in)

SMS Monarch (Note: "SMS" stands for "Seiner Majestät Schiff ", or "His Majesty's Ship" in German.) ("His Majesty's Ship Monarch") was the lead ship of the Monarch-class coastal defense ship built for the Austro-Hungarian Navy in the 1890s. After their commissioning, Monarch and the two other Monarch-class ships made several training cruises in the Mediterranean Sea in the early 1900s. Monarch and her sisters formed the 1st Capital Ship Division of the Austro-Hungarian Navy until they were replaced by the newly commissioned Habsburg-class pre-dreadnought battleships at the turn of the century. In 1906 the three Monarchs were placed in reserve and only recommissioned during the annual summer training exercises. After the start of World War I, Budapest was recommissioned and assigned to 5th Division together with her sisters.

The division was sent to Cattaro in August 1914 to attack Montenegrin and French artillery that was bombarding the port, and Monarch remained there for the rest of the war. The ship was decommissioned in early 1918 and became an accommodation ship. She was awarded to Great Britain by the Paris Peace Conference in 1920. The British sold her for scrap and she was broken up in Italy beginning in 1921.

== Description and construction ==
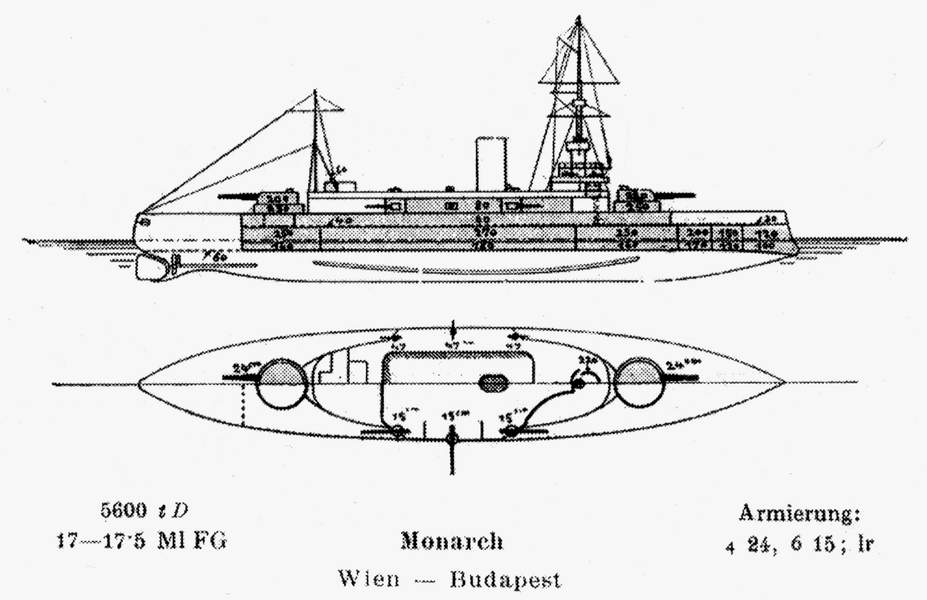
Right elevation and plan of the Monarch class; the shaded area is armored

At only 5,785 tonnes (5,694 long tons) maximum displacement, the Monarch class was less than half the size of the battleships of other major navies at the time, and were officially designated as coast defense ships. Austria-Hungary's only coastline was on the Adriatic Sea, and the Austro-Hungarian government believed that the role of its navy was solely to defend the nation's coast.

Monarch had an overall length of 99.22 meters (325 ft 6 in), a beam of 17 meters (55 ft 9 in) and a draft of 6.4 meters (21 ft 0 in). Her two 4-cylinder vertical triple-expansion steam engines produced a total of 8,500 indicated horsepower (6,300 kW) using steam from five cylindrical boilers. These gave the ship a maximum speed of 17.8 knots (33.0 km/h; 20.5 mph). Monarch's maximum load of 500 metric tons (490 LT) of coal gave her a range of 3,500 nautical miles (6,500 km; 4,000 mi) at a speed of 9 knots (17 km/h; 10 mph). She was manned by 26 officers and 397 enlisted men, a total of 423 personnel.

The armament of the Monarch class consisted of four 240-millimeter (9.4 in) Krupp K/94 guns mounted in two twin-gun turrets, one fore and one aft of the superstructure. The ships carried 80 rounds for each gun. Their secondary armament was six 150-millimeter (6 in) Škoda guns located in casemates in the superstructure. Ten quick-firing (QF) 47 mm (1.9 in) Škoda guns and four 47-millimeter QF Hotchkiss guns provided defense against torpedo boats. The ships also mounted two 450-millimeter (18 in) torpedo tubes, one on each broadside. Each torpedo tube was provided with two torpedoes. In 1917 a 66-millimeter (2.6 in) G. L/45 anti-aircraft gun was installed.

The ship's nickel-steel waterline armor belt was 120–270 millimeters (4.7–10.6 in) thick and the gun turrets were protected by 250 millimeters (9.8 in) of armor. The casemates had 80 millimeters (3.1 in) thick sides while the conning tower had 220 millimeters (8.7 in) of armor. Monarch's deck armor was 40 millimeters (1.6 in) thick.

The Monarch-class ships were ordered in May 1892, with Monarch to be built at the Pola Naval Arsenal (Seearsenal). The ship was laid down on 31 July 1893, and she was launched on 9 May 1895 by Archduchess Maria Theresa, wife of Archduke Karl Ludwig. She was commissioned on 11 May 1898.

== Service history ==
Monarch and her sisters formed the Navy's 1st Capital Ship Division (I. Schwere Division) in 1899, and the division made a training cruise to the Eastern Mediterranean where they made port visits in Greece, Lebanon, Turkey and Malta later that year. In early 1902, they made another training cruise to the Western Mediterranean with port visits in Algeria, Spain, France, Italy, Corfu, and Albania. The ship was fitted with a Siemens-Braun radio early the following year. The ships of the division were inspected by Archduke Franz Ferdinand, the heir to the throne, in March 1903 at Gravosa. In 1904, the Monarch-class ships formed the 2nd Capital Ship Division, and they took part in the 1904 cruise of the Adriatic and Mediterranean Seas as well as training exercises in which the three Habsburg-class battleships engaged the Budapest and her sisters in simulated combat. Those maneuvers marked the first time two homogeneous squadrons consisting of modern battleships operated in the Austro-Hungarian Navy. In the summer of 1905, Wien ran aground during a night exercise off Meleda Island; it took two tries by Budapest and Habsburg to pull her off.

The Monarchs were relegated to the newly formed Reserve Squadron on 1 January 1906, and were only recommissioned for the annual summer exercises. They participated in a fleet review by Archduke Franz Ferdinand, conducted in the Koločepski Channel near Šipan, in September. The ships were briefly recommissioned at the beginning of 1913, as the 4th Division after the start of the Second Balkan War, but were decommissioned again on 10 March. In early 1914, Monarch made a cruise in the Levant with the dreadnoughts Viribus Unitis, Tegetthoff and the predreadnought Zrínyi. Two of the ship's crew came down with smallpox and cerebrospinal meningitis in Egypt and caused the ship to be quarantined for several weeks in Pola.

=== World War I ===
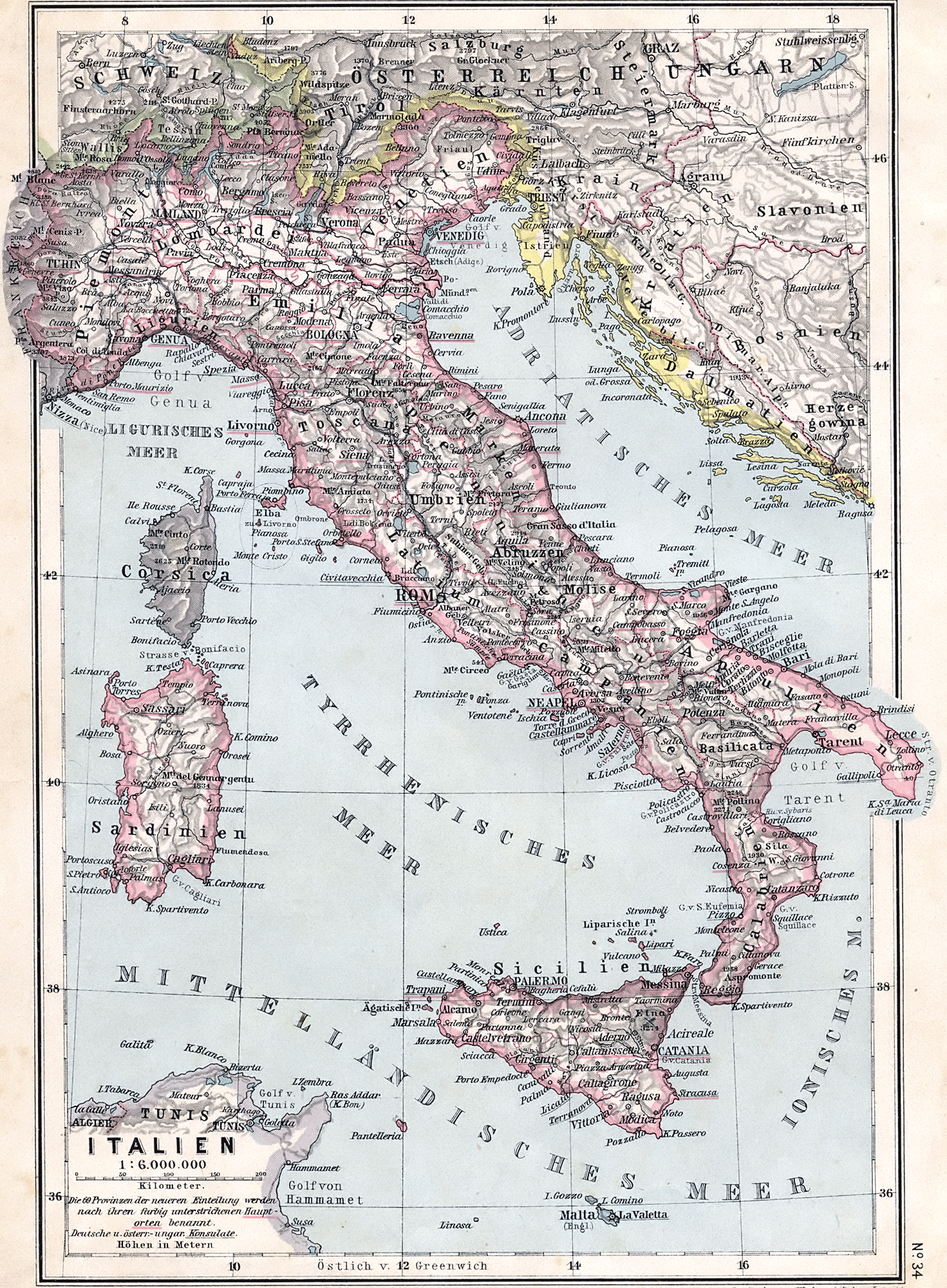
A map of the upper Adriatic Sea

With the beginning of World War I the three Monarchs were recommissioned as the 5th Division. They were sent down to the Bay of Kotor in August 1914, to attack Montenegrin artillery batteries on Mount Lovćen bombarding the Austro-Hungarian naval base at Cattaro and the fortifications defending it. Monarch and her sisters arrived on 13 August, but their guns could not elevate enough to engage all of the enemy artillery, which was reinforced by eight French guns on 19 October. The battleship Radetzky was summoned to deal with the guns two days later, and she managed to knock out several French guns and forced the others to withdraw by 27 October.

Monarch remained at Cattaro for the rest of the war to deter any further attacks. The ship's crew joined in the Cattaro Mutiny in early February 1918. Six weeks later she became an accommodation ship for the submarine crews based at nearby Gjenovic. Monarch was handed over to Great Britain as war reparations in January 1920 and broken up for scrap in Italy in 1921.
