= Siemens (surname) =

Siemens, Simens, Ziemens
- Pronunciation: German: [ˈziːməns, -mɛns]

Origin
- Language: Low German
- Meaning: Simon
- Region of origin: Northern Germany

Other names
- Variant forms: Ziemens; Siemon, Siemen (Simen), Siem, Siems, Siemes, Siemsen (Siemssen), Simsen (Simssen), etc.; Simonsen (Simonssen)

Siemens may refer to

Siemens, a German family name carried by generations of telecommunications industrialists.

== Notable surnames ==
- (Ernst) Werner (since 1888) von Siemens (known as Werner) (1816, Gehrden – 1892), inventor, founder of Siemens AG
  - (Carl) Wilhelm Siemens (known as (Charles) Wilhelm or Sir William Siemens) (1823, Lenthe – 1883), brother of Werner von Siemens
  - Carl (Heinrich) von Siemens (1829, Menzendorf – 1906), brother of Werner von Siemens
  - Georg von Siemens (1839–1901), banker and politician, nephew of Werner von Siemens
  - Alexander Siemens (1847, Hanover – 1928), cousin of Werner von Siemens
  - Arnold (since 1888) von Siemens (1853, Berlin – 1918), son of Werner von Siemens
  - (Georg) Wilhelm (since 1888) von Siemens (known as Wilhelm) (1855, Berlin – 1919), son of Werner von Siemens
  - Carl Friedrich von Siemens (1872, Berlin – 1941), son of Werner von Siemens
  - Hermann (Werner) von Siemens (1885, Berlin – 1986), nephew of Werner von Siemens
  - Ernst von Siemens (1903, Kingston upon Thames – 1990), nephew of Werner von Siemens
  - Peter von Siemens (1911, Berlin – 1986), nephew of Werner von Siemens
- Hermann Werner Siemens (1869, Charlottenburg – 1969), geneticist
- Jacob "Jake" (John) Siemens (1896, Altona, Manitoba – 1963), a Canadian social entrepreneur and adult educator of Mennonite descent

== Fictional characters ==
- Yasch Siemens, a fictional Mennonite man from Armin Wiebe's novel The Salvation of Yasch Siemens
