= Siemens family =

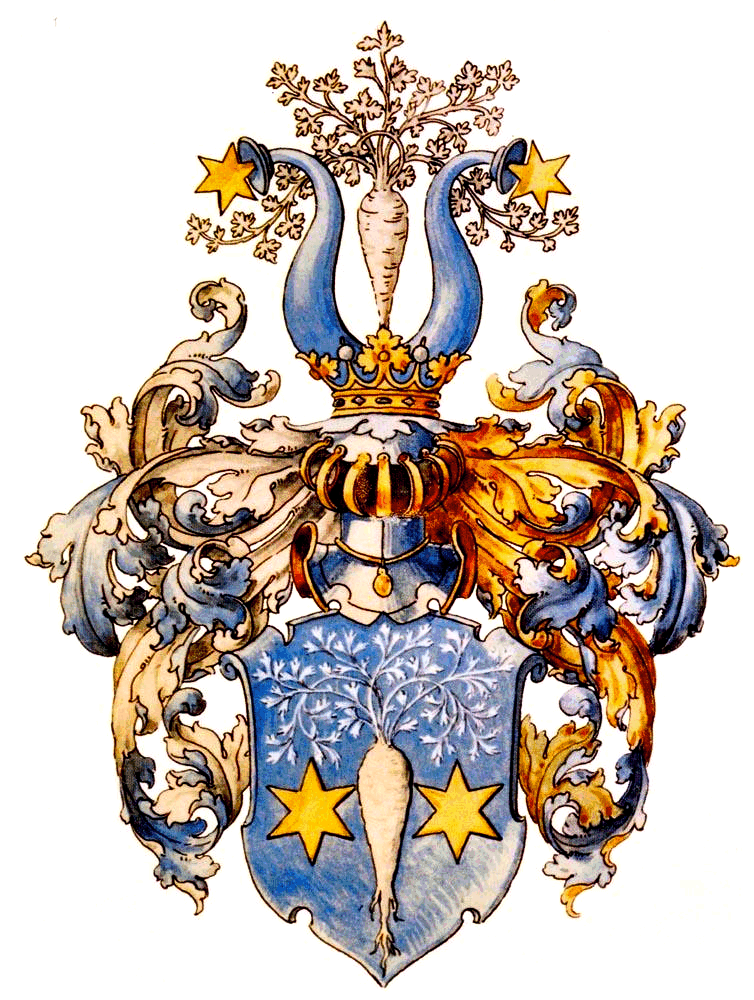
Coat of Arms of the Siemens Family

The Siemens family is a German noble family of technology and telecommunications industrialists, whose members were the founders and have been to the present day the largest shareholders of Siemens AG. In 2016, the family had a combined wealth of 6.2 billion euros, making them one of the richest families in Germany.

== History ==
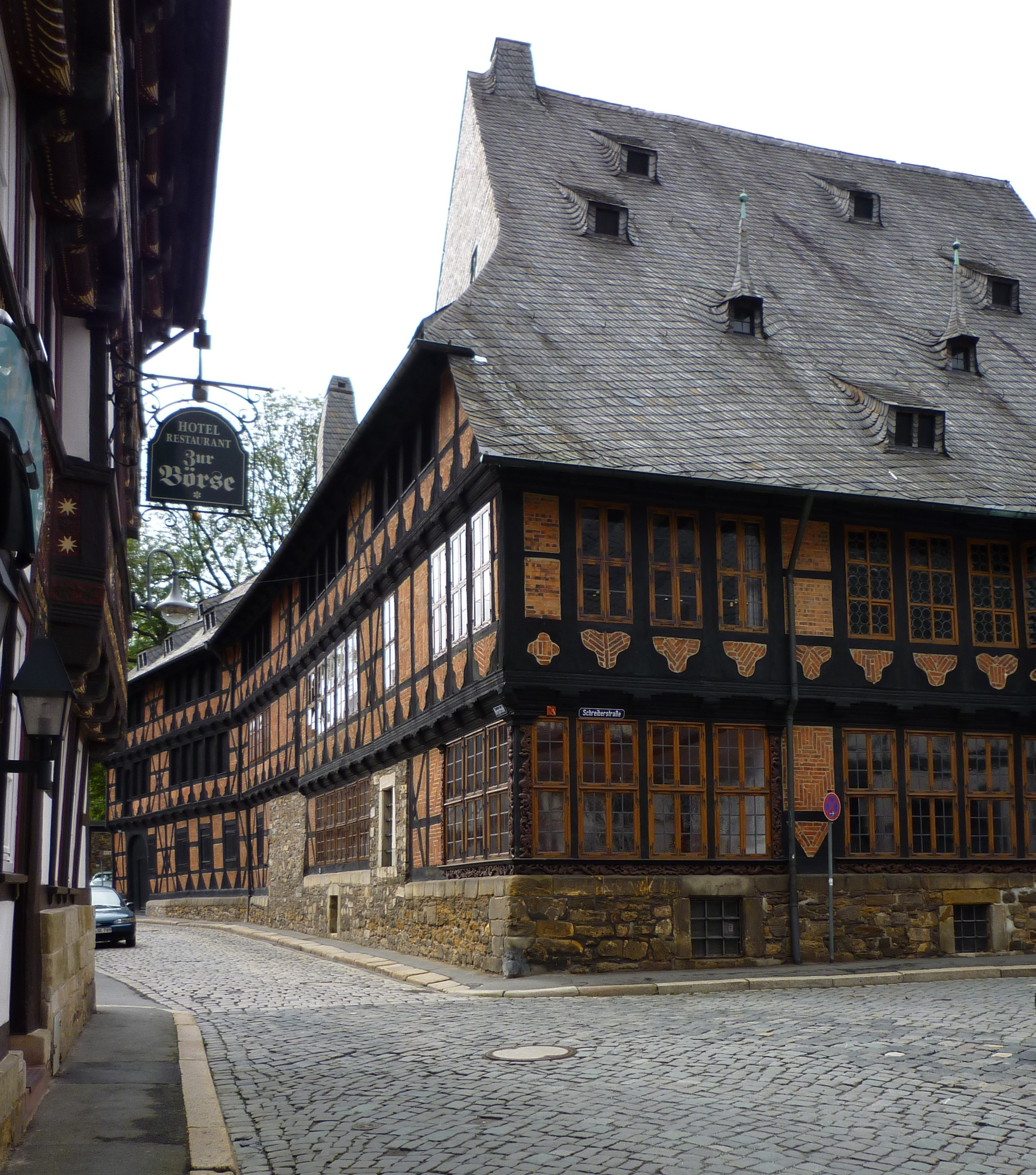
Siemens House in Goslar, built in 1692

=== Origin ===
The Siemens family was first documented in 1384 with Henning Symons, a farmer of the Free imperial city of Goslar in Lower Saxony, Germany. The family tree begins with Ananias Siemens (c. 1538 – 1591), a citizen, brewer and owner of an oil mill in Goslar, belonging to the Shoemaker's Guild, as his ancestors were shoemakers.

His grandson Hans (1628–94), speaker of the Merchant's Guild and commander of the town's vigilance committee, built the Siemens House in Goslar in 1692. It is still owned by the family and houses their private archives and an exhibition on the family history. The Siemens family provided numerous members to Goslar city council as well as four mayors, the last being Johann Georg (1748–1807).

=== Development ===
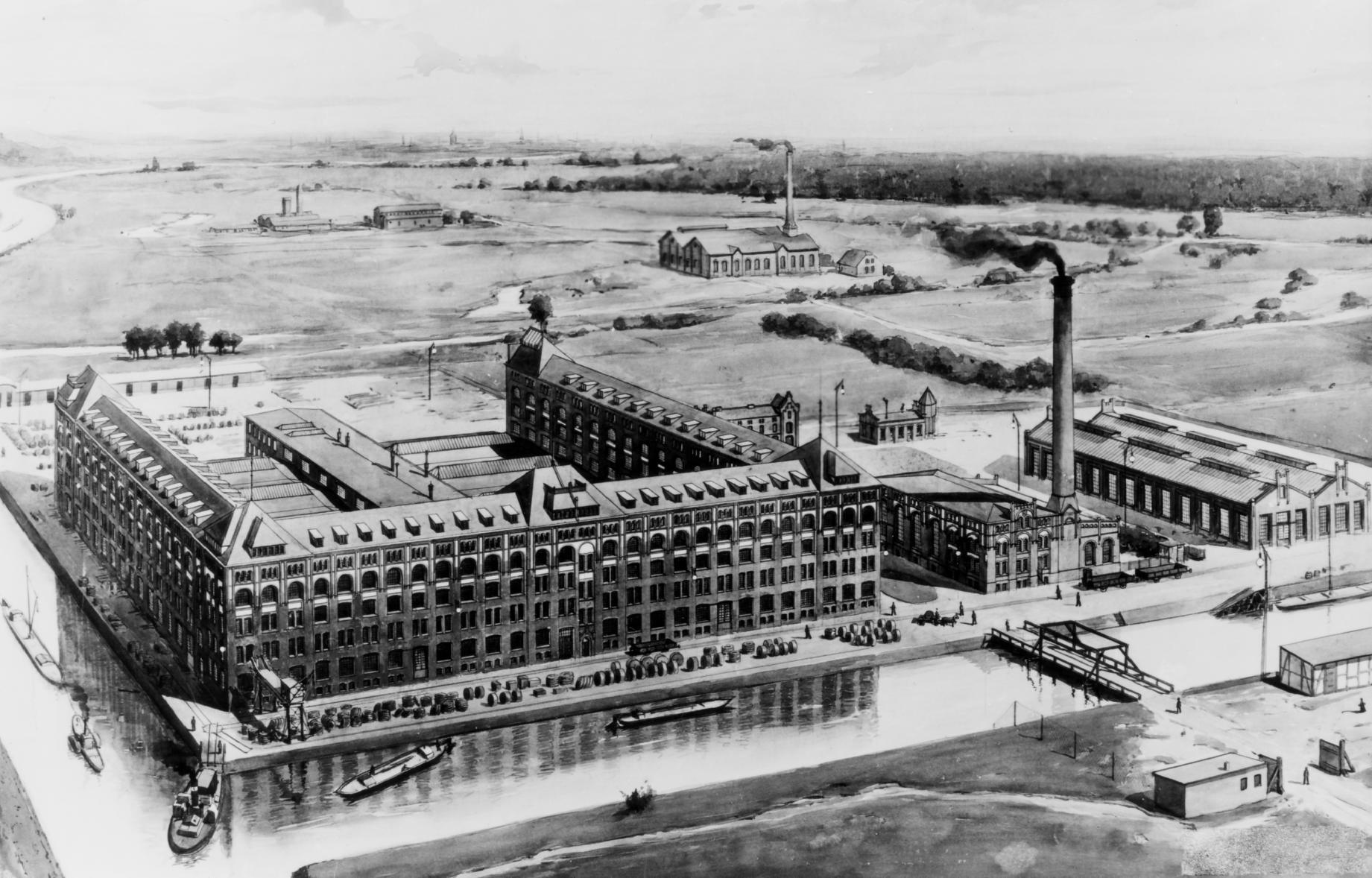
Siemens Cable factory in Berlin-Siemensstadt around 1900

The most important branches of the Goslar family—there are also other families with the same surname in Northern Germany—go back to the farmer Christian Ferdinand Siemens (1787–1840). His sons Werner Siemens (since 1888 von Siemens), (Carl) Wilhelm Siemens (known as Sir William Siemens), Hans Siemens, Friedrich Siemens and Carl (Heinrich) von Siemens became engineers and entrepreneurs.

Werner Siemens, a former artillery and engineering officer in the Prussian army, invented a telegraph that used a needle to point to the right letter instead of using Morse code. Based on this invention, he founded the company Telegraphen-Bauanstalt von Siemens & Halske on 1 October 1847, with the company taking occupation of its workshop on 12 October. His business partner Johann Georg Halske, a master mechanic, was particularly involved in the construction and design of electrical equipment such as the press which enabled wires to be insulated with a seamless coat of gutta-percha, the pointer telegraph, the morse telegraph and measuring instruments. The company was internationalised soon after its founding. One of Werner’s brothers represented him in England (Sir William Siemens) and another in St Petersburg, Russia (Carl von Siemens), each earning recognition. In 1867 Mr Halske withdrew from the company because his more conservative views on company policy diverged from those of the rather venturous Siemens brothers.

In 1848 the company built the first long-distance telegraph line in Europe, 500 km from Berlin to Frankfurt am Main. In the 1850s the company was involved in building long-distance telegraph networks in Russia. In 1867 Siemens completed the monumental Indo-European (Calcutta to London) telegraph line and in 1870 a transatlantic communications cable. In 1857, Werner von Siemens described the countercurrent exchange and in 1867 a dynamo without permanent magnets. A similar system was also independently invented by Charles Wheatstone, but Siemens became the first company to build such devices. In 1881, a Siemens AC Alternator driven by a watermill was used to power the world's first electric street lighting in the town of Godalming, United Kingdom. The company continued to grow and diversified into electric trains and light bulbs. In 1887 it opened its first office in Japan. In 1890, the founder retired and left running the company to his brother Carl and sons Arnold and Wilhelm.

In 1888 Werner Siemens received hereditary ennoblement as von Siemens by Frederick III, German Emperor. His brother William had been knighted – becoming Sir William – by Queen Victoria a few months before his death in 1883. The brother Carl in St Petersburg was ennobled by Tsar Nicholas II in 1895. Werner's cousin and father-in-law, Carl Georg Siemens (1809–1885), a professor of technology at the University of Hohenheim, received personal ennoblement from the King of Württemberg. Werner's nephew Georg, co-founder of Deutsche Bank, was ennobled by Wilhelm II, German Emperor, in 1899.

Siemens & Halske (S & H) was incorporated in 1897 and then merged parts of its activities with Schuckert & Co., Nuremberg, in 1903 to become Siemens-Schuckert. In 1919 S & H and two other companies jointly formed the Osram lightbulb company. During the 1920s and 1930s S & H started to manufacture radios, television sets and electron microscopes. In 1932 Reiniger, Gebbert & Schall (Erlangen), Phönix AG (Rudolstadt) and Siemens-Reiniger-Veifa mbH (Berlin) merged to form the Siemens-Reiniger-Werke AG (SRW), a producer of medical technology and the third of the so-called parent companies that Ernst von Siemens decided in 1966 to merge to form the present-day Siemens AG, which is one of the largest electro-technological firms in the world. The company, during all its stages from Siemens & Halske AG, Siemens-Schuckertwerke AG and Siemens-Reiniger-Werke AG until its merger to Siemens AG in 1966, has always been led by subsequent generations of the founder's family, at first by Werner's brother Carl, then by Werner's sons Arnold, Wilhelm and Carl Friedrich, later by his grandsons Hermann and Ernst, and until 1981 by his great-grandson Peter von Siemens.

Today the descendants of Werner and Carl von Siemens have a minority ownership of 6.9% (by comparison: the Ford family controls the Ford Motor Company with a share of 2%), thus still being the largest single shareholder. Based on a market cap of €112 billion, the Siemens family holds €7.7 billion worth of common stock in the company and received €201 million in dividends in 2016. Considerable parts of this share have been endowed to charitable trusts controlled by family members. The family keeps a seat in the Siemens Supervisory Board and is said to take influence in the background. Until 1981, the chairman of the Supervisory Board has always been a member of the family. The von Siemens are said to return to the chairmanship in the future should necessity require it or an eligible candidate be ready to run. The clan's principal aim has always been to guarantee its 169 years old company independence, stability and solid growth.

== Family members ==
- (Ernst) Werner (since 1888) von Siemens (known as Werner) (1816, Gehrden – 1892), inventor, founder of Siemens AG
- (Carl) Wilhelm Siemens (known as (Charles) Wilhelm or Sir William Siemens) (1823, Lenthe – 1883), brother of Werner von Siemens
- Carl (Heinrich) von Siemens (1829, Menzendorf – 1906), brother of Werner von Siemens
- Georg von Siemens (1839–1901), banker and politician, nephew of Werner von Siemens
- Alexander Siemens (1847, Hanover – 1928), cousin of Werner von Siemens
- Arnold (since 1888) von Siemens (1853, Berlin – 1918), son of Werner von Siemens
- (Georg) Wilhelm (since 1888) von Siemens (known as Wilhelm) (1855, Berlin – 1919), son of Werner von Siemens
- Carl Friedrich von Siemens (1872, Berlin – 1941), son of Werner von Siemens
- Hermann (Werner) von Siemens (1885, Berlin – 1986), grandson of Werner von Siemens
- Ernst von Siemens (1903, Kingston upon Hull – 1990), grandson of Werner von Siemens
- Peter von Siemens (1911, Berlin – 1986), great-grandson of Werner von Siemens
- Friedrich Siemens (December 8, 1826, Menzendorf – May 24, 1904, Dresden)

=== Images ===
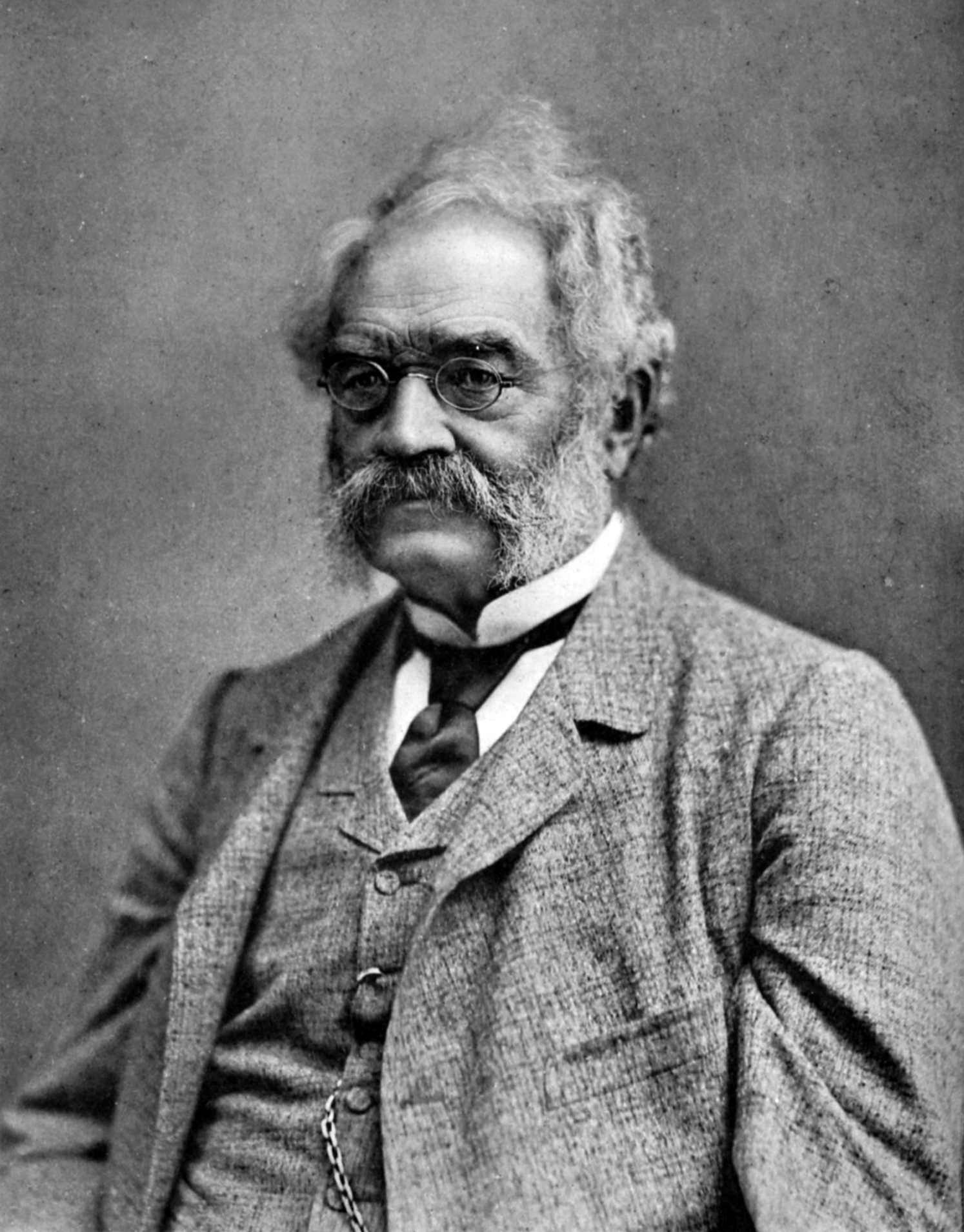
Werner Siemens (1816–1892), since 1888 Werner von Siemens

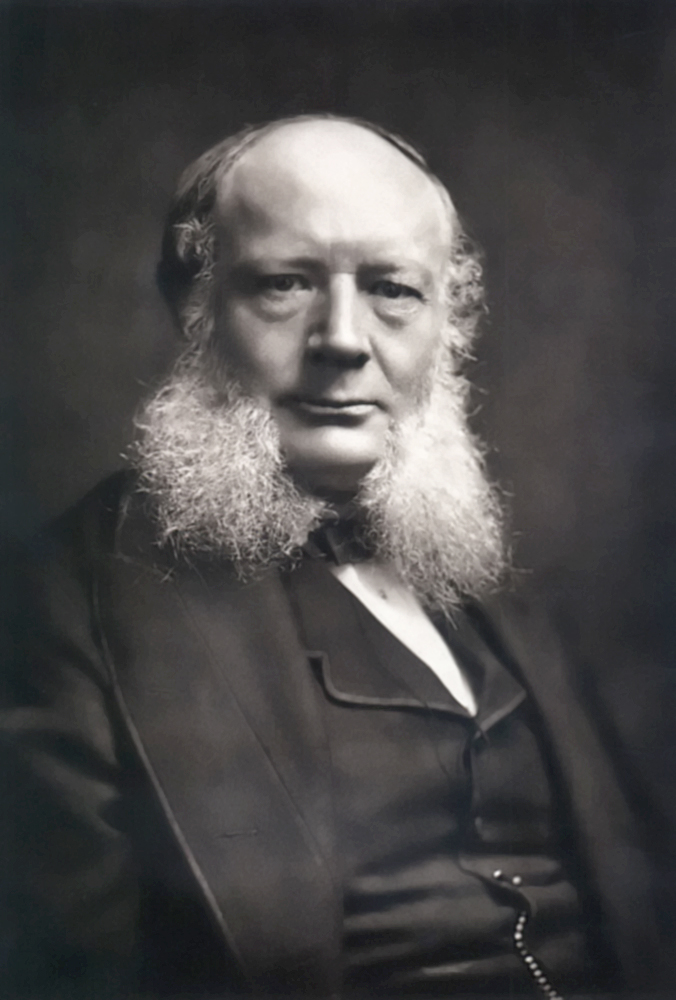
William Siemens (1823–1883), since 1883 Sir William Siemens, brother of Werner

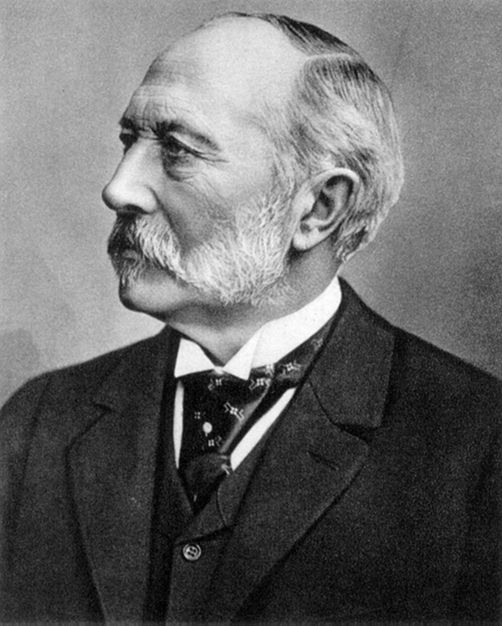
Carl Siemens (1829–1906), since 1895 Carl von Siemens, brother of Werner

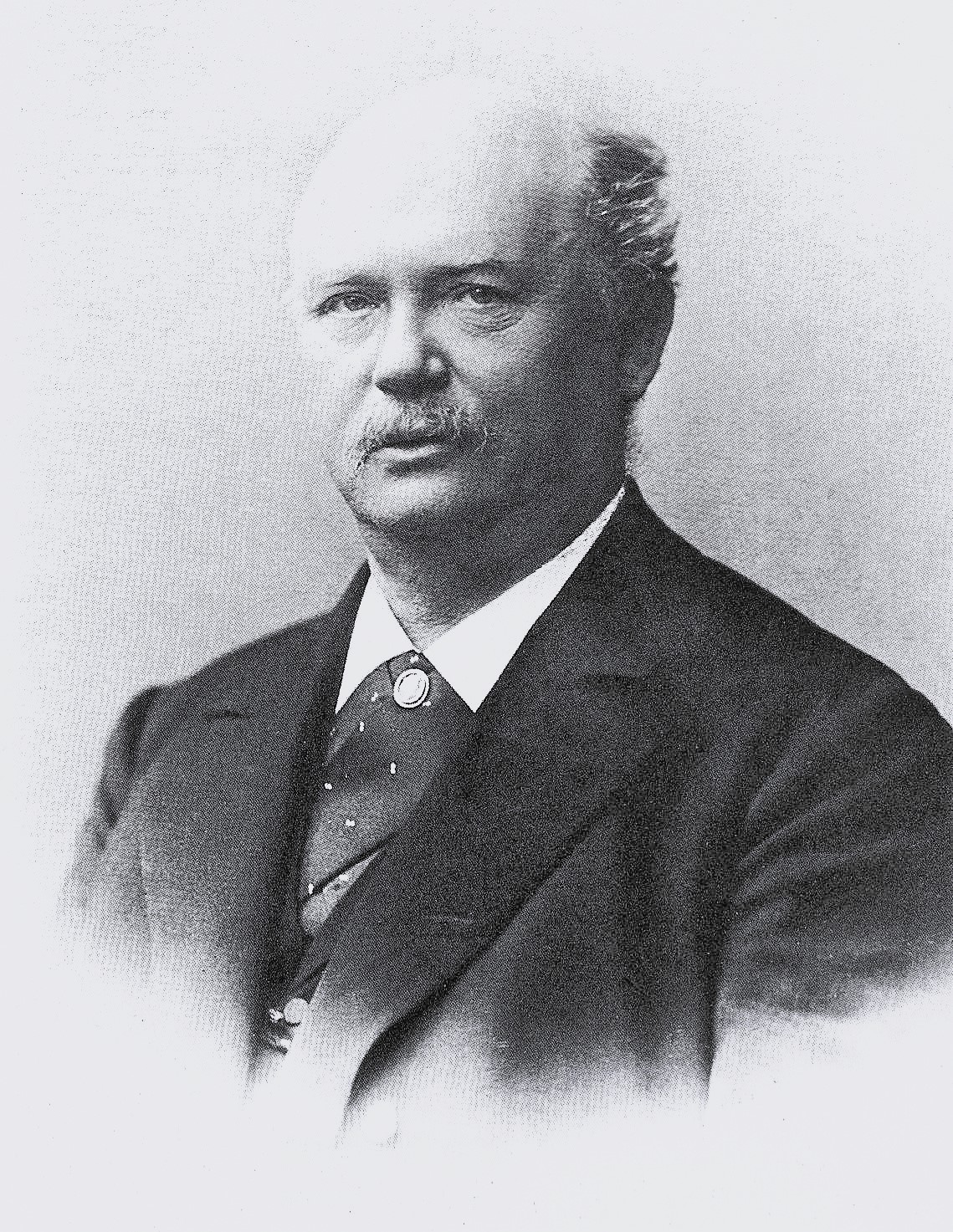
Georg Siemens (1839–1901), since 1899 Georg von Siemens, nephew of Werner von Siemens, founding director of Deutsche Bank

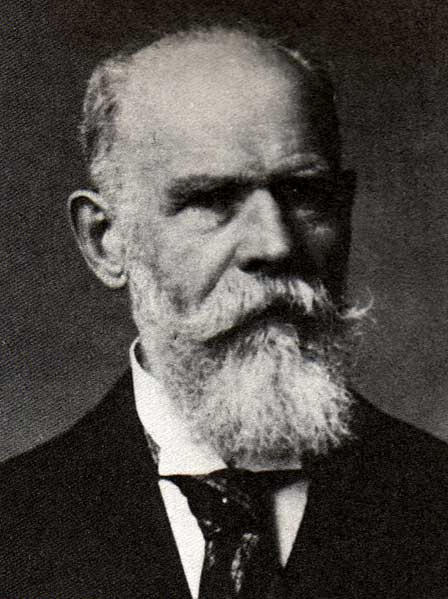
Arnold von Siemens (1853–1918), son of Werner von Siemens

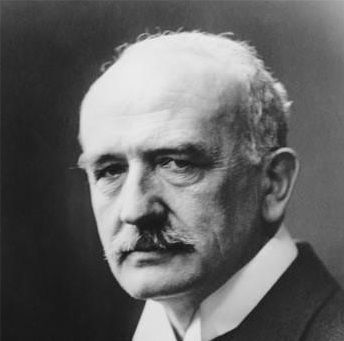
Georg Wilhelm von Siemens (1855–1919), son of Werner von Siemens

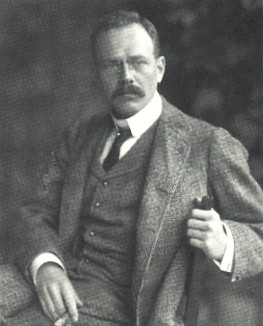
Carl Friedrich von Siemens (1872–1941), son of Werner von Siemens

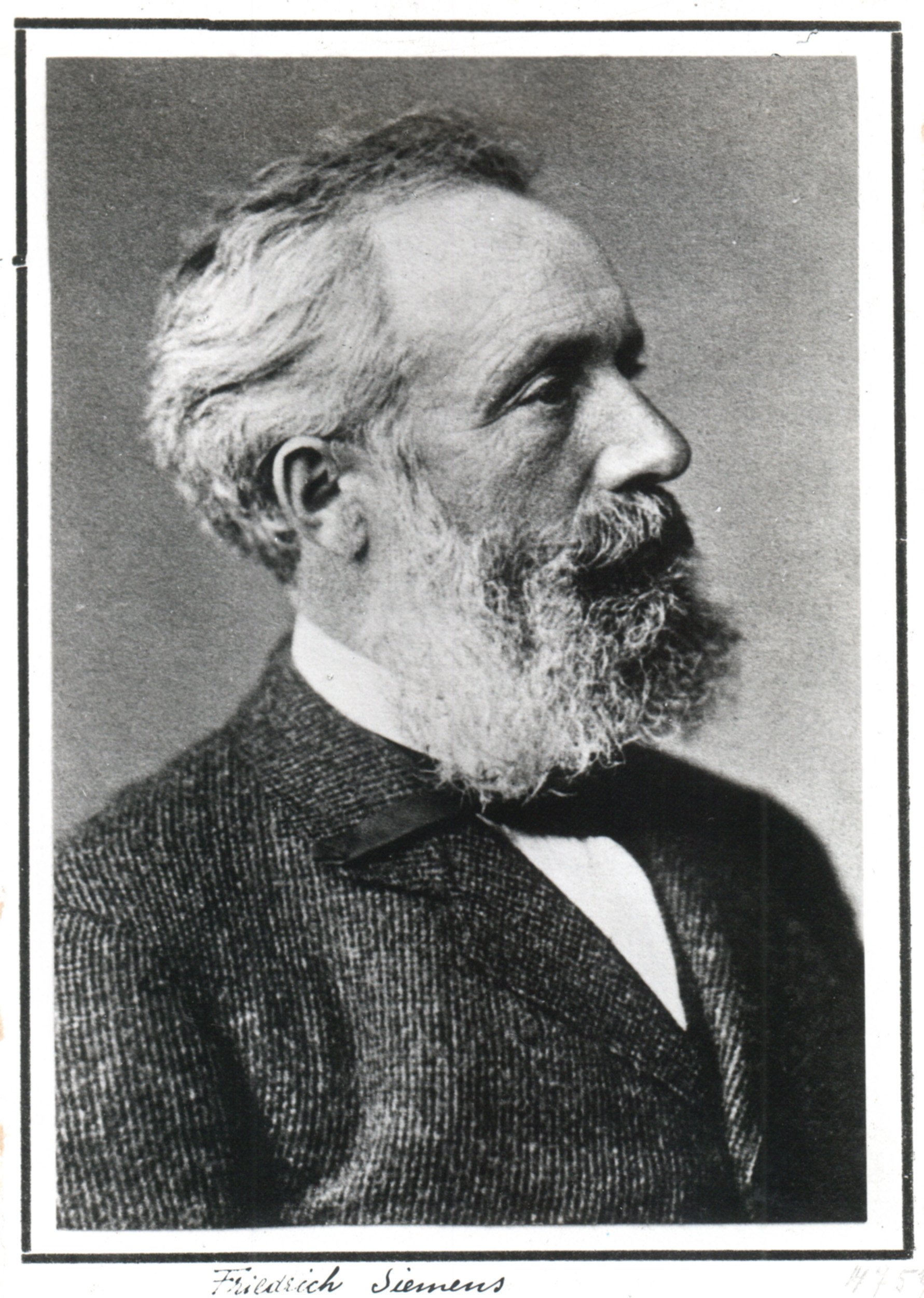
Portrait of Friedrich Siemens (1826–1904), inventor and engineer

== Family tree ==
=== Family branches ===
Main Branch Ananias	Branch of Georg Andreas; Sub-branch of Ananias	Branch of Heinrich Albrecht; Sub-branch of Ananias	Branch of Johann Georg; Sub-branch of Georg Andreas, including Georg von Siemens	Branch of Christian Ferdinand; Sub-branch of Georg Andreas, including Werner von Siemens and brothers

=== Branch from Ananias Siemens (Founding Father) ===
Generations 1–9

Ananias Siemens * ca. 1538, † 1591 Goslar; Citizen and brewer ∞ Anna Brüggemann (2. marriage); 8 children
(Kind) #6 Peter Siemens * ca. 1586 Goslar, † 1650; Taylor and member of city council ∞ Agnetha Oppermann (1605–63, 3. marriage); 8 children
#2 Hans Jürgen Siemens * 1628 Goslar, † 1694; Merchant ∞ Anna Volckmar (1636–1717); 6 children
#3 Hans Henning Siemens * 1667 Goslar, † 1725 Ohlhof tenant of an agricultural estate ∞ Anna Volbrecht (1674–1715); 11 children
#4 Georg Andreas Siemens * 1700 Goslar, † 1789 Ohlhof tenant of an estate ∞ Agnes Koch (1716–97, 2. Ehe); 9 children	#6 Heinrich Albrecht Siemens * 1703 Goslar, † 1758 tenant of an estate ∞ Elisabeth Sternberg (1710–71); 14 children
#3 Joh. Georg Heinrich Siemens * 1735 Ohlhof, † 1805 Wasserleben tenant of an estate ∞ Sophie Huet (1740–99); 15 children	#6 Carl Leopold Siemens * 1739 Goslar, † 1805 Seesen tenant of an estate ∞ Justine Brüel (1746–1828); 10 children
#1 Johann Georg Siemens * 1764 Schauen, † 1827 Langenstein tenant of an estate ∞ Sophie Barkhausen (1776–1808, 1. Ehe); 6 children	#15 Christian Ferdinand Siemens * 1787 Schauen, † 1840 Menzendorf tenant of an estate ∞ Henriette Deichmann (1792–1839); 14 children	#8 Ernst Franz Siemens * 1780 Goslar, † 1854 Hannover tenant of an estate and inventor ∞ Georgine Müller (1784–1862); 13 children
#1 Johann Georg Siemens * 1805 Langenstein, † 1879 Ahlsdorf; Barrister ∞ Marie von Sperl (1819–1902); 1 child	Werner von Siemens (1816–92) and siblings See below	#1 Gustav Siemens * 1806 Aerzen, † 1874 Hannover; Lawyer and Politician ∞ Sophie Heise (1818–88); 2 children	#3 Carl Georg von Siemens * 1809 Pyrmont, † 1885 Bad Harzburg; Professor of Technology ∞ Ottilie Denzel (1812–82); 1 child	#4 Adolf Siemens * 1811 Pyrmont, † 1887 Berlin; General of the Artillery and inventor ∞ Antonie Cleve (1827–96); 2 children
#1 Georg von Siemens * 1839 Torgau, † 1901 Berlin; Founding CEO of Deutsche Bank ∞ Elise Görz (1850–1938); 6 children	#1 Alexander Siemens * 1847 Hannover † 1928 Milford-on-Sea/England; Entrepreneur* and Engineer ∞ Louisa Dodwell († 1934); 3 children	#1 Antonie Siemens * 1840 Hohenheim, † 1900 Berlin ∞ Werner von Siemens (1816–92); 2 children

=== Descendants of Christian Ferdinand Siemens (partial excerpt) ===
Generations 7–12

Christian Ferdinand Siemens * 1787 Schauen, † 1840 Menzendorf; Tenant of an estate ∞ Henriette Deichmann (1792–1839); 14 children
#4 Werner von Siemens * 1816 Lenthe † 1892 Charlottenburg; Inventor, Founder of Siemens & Halske* ∞ Mathilde Drumann (1824–65) ∞ Antonie Siemens (1840–1900); 6 children (4 with Mathilde, 2 with Antonie)	#5 Hans Siemens * 1818 Lenthe † 1867 Löbtau; Owner of a glass factory and inventor ∞ Alma Müller (1831–1914); 5 children	#6 Ferdinand Siemens * 1820 Lenthe † 1893 Piontken; Owner of an estate in East Prussia ∞ Eulalia Hertzog (1835–1916); 4 children	#8 Sir William Siemens * 1823 Lenthe † 1883 Sherwood/England; Inventor and Entrepreneur (Co-founder and shareholder of Siemens Brothers Ltd, London)* ∞ Anne Gordon (1821–1901) no children	#9 Friedrich Siemens * 1826 Menzendorf † 1904 Dresden; Owner of a glass factory and inventor ∞ Elise Witthauer (1843–1919); 6 children	#10 Carl von Siemens * 1829 Menzendorf † 1906 Menton/Frankreich, Entrepreneur*, 1. Chairman of the Board of Siemens & Halske AG (1897–1904); ∞ Marie von Kapherr (1836–69); 5 children
#1 Arnold von Siemens * 1853 Berlin † 1918 Berlin; Entrepreneur*, Chairman of the Board of Siemens & Halske AG (1904–1918) ∞ Ellen von Helmholtz (1864–1941); 5 children	#2 Georg Wilhelm von Siemens * 1855 Berlin † 1918 Arosa/Schweiz; Entrepreneur and inventor, Chairman of the Board of Siemens-Schuckertwerke AG (1903–1918) and of Siemens & Halske AG (1918–1919) ∞ Elly Siemens (1860–1919); 2 children	#6 Carl Friedrich von Siemens * 1872 Charlottenburg † 1941 Heinenhof; Entrepreneur*, Chairman of the Boards of Siemens & Halske AG and Siemens-Schuckertwerke AG (1919–1941) ∞ Tutty Bötzow (1878–1935, 2. marriage); 2 children	# 2 Elly Siemens * 1860 Piontken † 1919 Charlottenburg ∞ Georg Wilhelm von Siemens (1855–1919); 2 children	#4 Friedrich Carl Siemens * 1877 Dresden † 1952 Berlin; Entrepreneur*, Chairman of the Boards of Siemens & Halske AG and Siemens-Schuckertwerke AG (1946–1948) ∞ Bertha Yorck von Wartenburg (1899–1950); 4 children
#1 Hermann von Siemens * 1885 Berlin † 1986 in Munich; Entrepreneur*, Chairman of the Boards of Siemens & Halske AG and Siemens-Schuckertwerke AG (1941–1946 and 1948–1956) ∞ Charlotte von Maltzan (1887–1976); 6 children	#1 Werner Ferdinand von Siemens * 1885 Berlin, † 1937; Entrepreneur*, CEO of Siemens & Halske AG ∞ Katrin Heck († 1919, 1. marriage); 3 children	#1 Ernst von Siemens * 1903 Kingston upon Hull/England † 1990 Starnberg; Entrepreneur*, CEO of Siemens & Halske AG (1949–1956), Chairman of the Boards of Siemens & Halske AG and Siemens-Schuckertwerke AG (1956–1966) and of Siemens AG (1966–1971) patron of the arts, unmarried, no children
#2 Henning von Siemens * 1921 Berlin † 2014 in Munich; Physicist ∞ Christa; Schwabenthan (* 1941); 1 child	#1 Peter von Siemens * 1911 Berlin † 1986 in Munich; Entrepreneur*, Chairman of the board of Siemens AG (1971–1981) ∞ Maria Julia Lienau (1916–2008); 2 children
#1 Nathalie von Siemens * 1971 Munich; Chairperson of the Siemens Foundation, Member of the Supervisory Board of Siemens AG* (since 2015)	#1 Peter C. von Siemens * 1937 Rio de Janeiro; Management board member and member of the Supervisory Board of Siemens AG* ∞ Bettina Schicht (* 1942); 4 children

(*) Leading function at Siemens & Halske, Siemens Brothers & Co and/or Siemens AG.
