= Electric telegraphy in Imperial Russia =

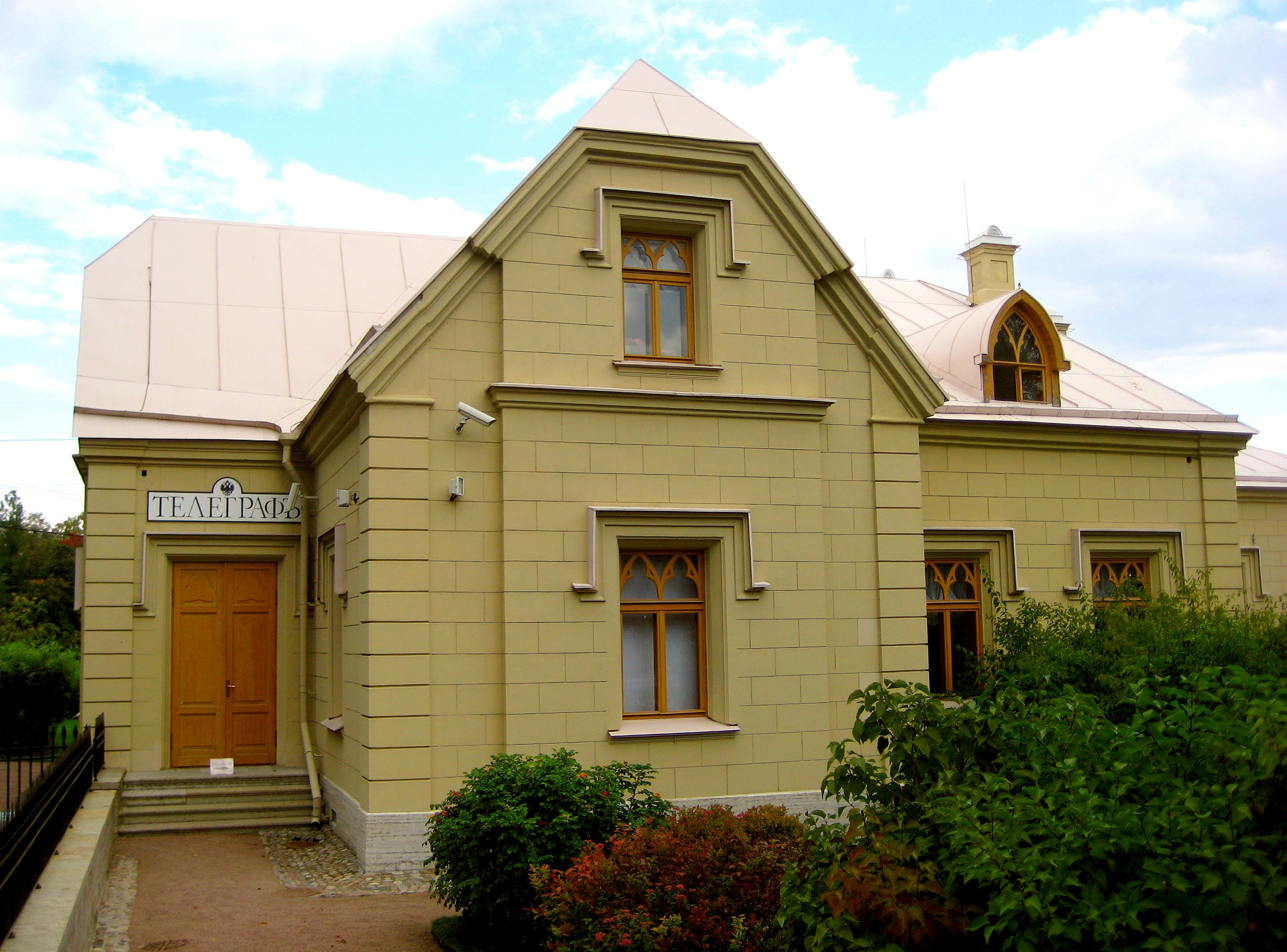
Palace Telegraph Station (1858), designed by Andrei Stackenschneider and located in Alexandria Park, Peterhof

Electric telegraphy in Imperial Russia was pioneered by Pavel Schilling, a Baltic German aristocrat who had developed the Schilling telegraph, the first electromagnetic telegraph that was of practical use. This work was taken up by Moritz von Jacobi who in 1842-5 installed an underground cable to provide a telegraph line between St Petersburg and the Imperial palace at Tsarskoye Selo. Terminals were also installed in Oranienbaum and Kronstadt.

In 1853 the Russian government awarded a contract to Siemens & Halske to develop a telegraph system. Carl Heinrich von Siemens arrived in St Petersburg where he established the Russian branch of the company.
