= Friedrich Siemens =

German entrepreneur

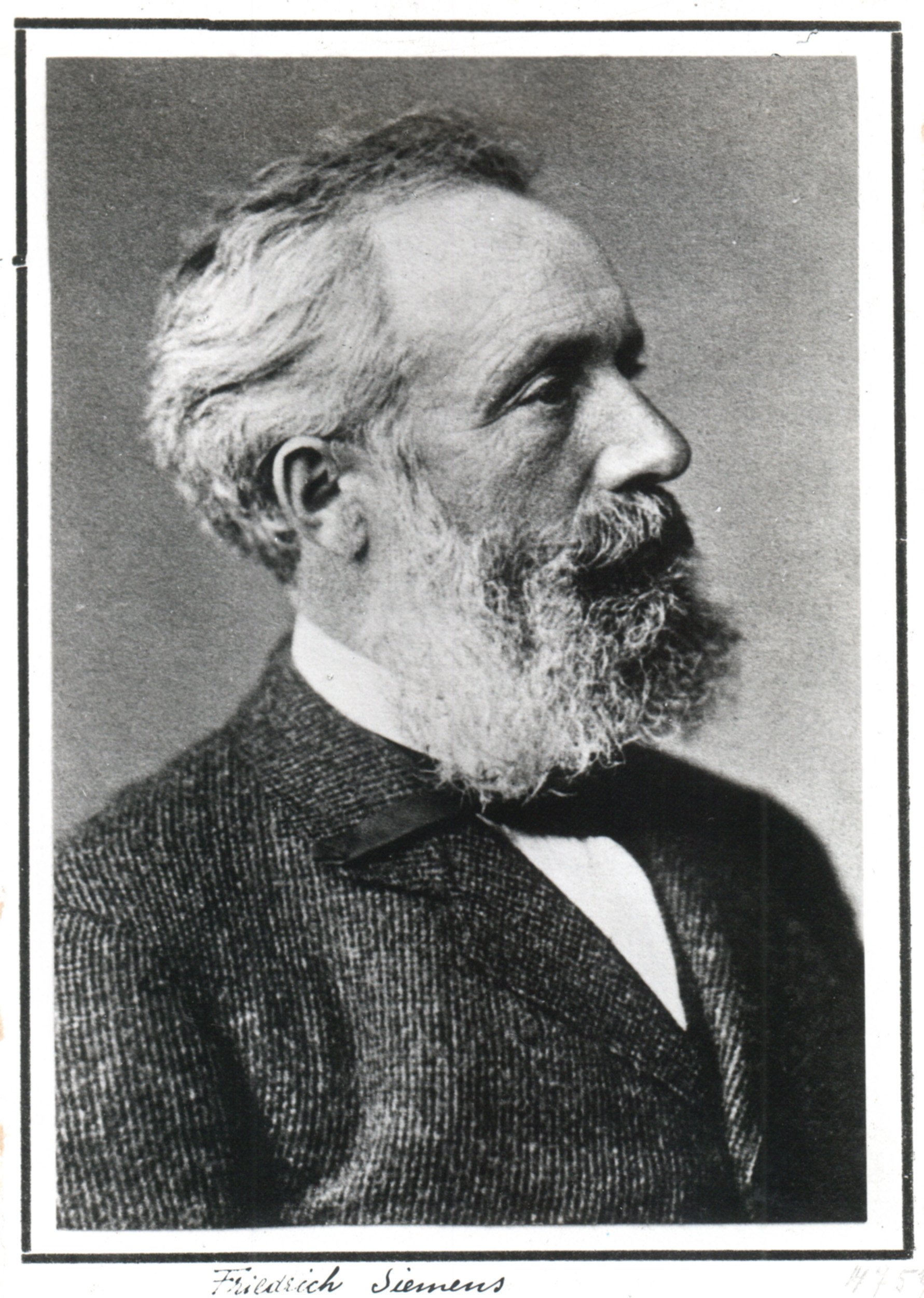
Portrait of Friedrich Siemens (1826-1904), Inventor and Engineer

Friedrich August Siemens (born 8 December 1826 in Menzendorf; died 24 May 1904 in Dresden) was a German entrepreneur from the Siemens family and a brother of Werner von Siemens.

== Biography ==
Friedrich Siemens was the eleventh child of Christian Ferdinand Siemens (1787–1840) and his wife Eleonore Henriette Deichmann (1792–1839). His parents died when Siemens was young, and he grew up with an uncle.

Siemens married Elise Witthauer. The couple had six children: Walter (21 December 1864 - 19 January 1883), Lisbet (4 March 1866 - 24 April 1947 in Dresden), Marie (29 October 1868 - 16 March 1875), Friedrich Carl Siemens (6 January 1877 - 25 June 1952), Werner Ferdinand Siemens (29 September 1880 - 25 September 1915), and Wilhelm (Willi) Otto (7 August 1882 - 21 December 1945 in Dresden).

In his younger years, Siemens came to England. There he worked for the company of his brother Werner von Siemens. In 1856, Siemens established his own company Friedrich Siemens Industrieofenbau in Dresden.

Siemens died in Dresden in 1904. His grave is located in the New Annenfriedhof in Dresden-Löbtau. The grave figure was created by the sculptor Johannes Schilling.

== Literature ==
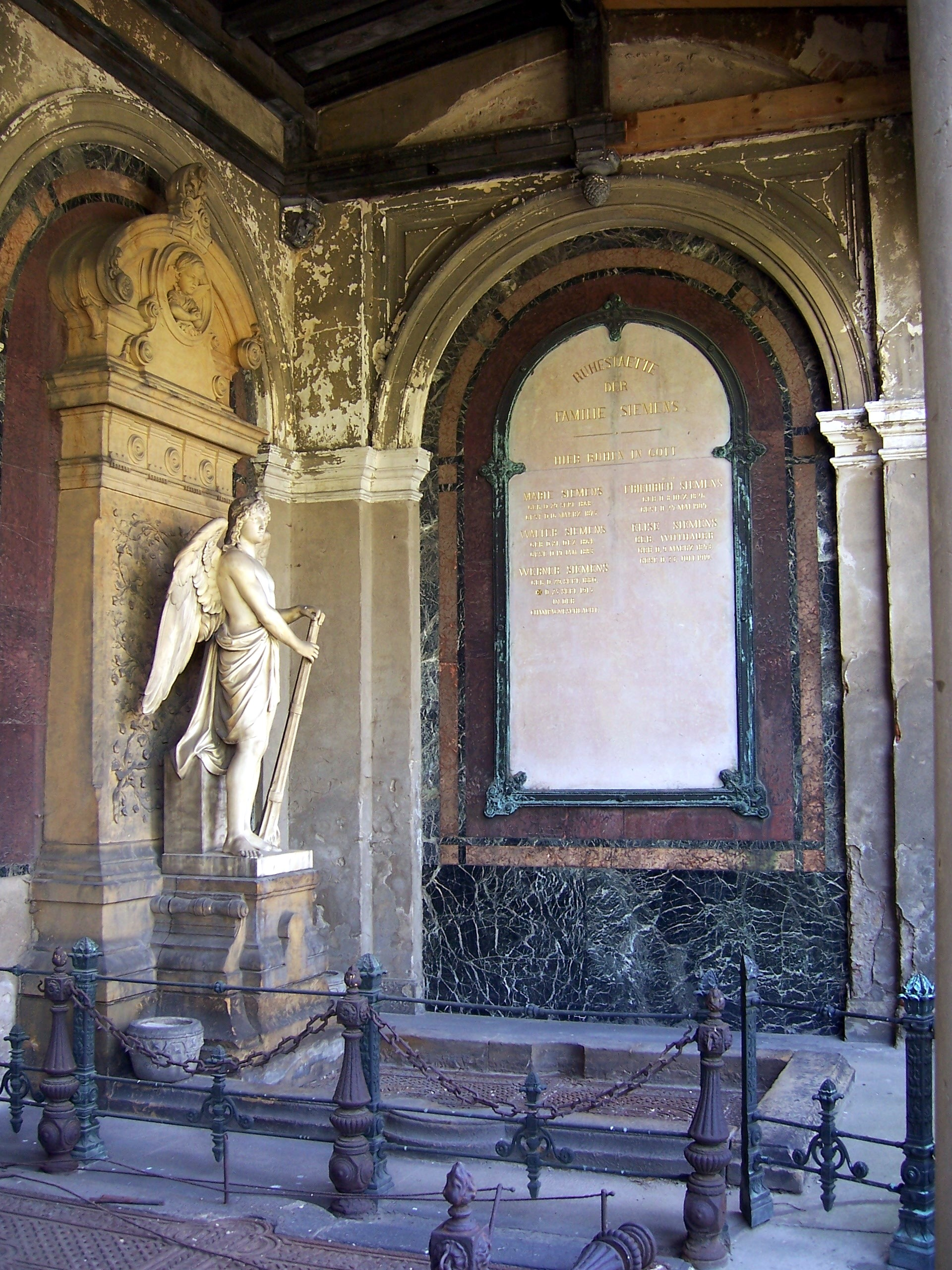
Grave of Friedrich Siemens

- Karl Burhenne: Siemens. In: Allgemeine Deutsche Biographie (ADB). Volume 55, Duncker & Humblot, Leipzig 1910, pp. 203–228. (Family article - see p. 219)
- August Roth: Friedrich August Siemens. in: Siemens magazine, Volume 6, Issue 12 (December 1926), pp. 581–590
- Wilhelm Rothert: General Hannoversche Biography, Volume 2: In the Old Kingdom of Hanover 1814–1866; Hanover: Sponholtz, 1914, pp. 445–462 (Werner von Siemens and his brothers)
- Frank Wittendorfer: Siemens, Friedrich August. In: New German Biography (NDB). Volume 24, Duncker & Humblot, Berlin 2010, ISBN 978-3-428-11205-0, p. 374 f. (Digitized version).

== See also ==
- Siemens family
