= Palais Ludwig Ferdinand =

Coordinates: 48°08′38″N 11°34′35″E

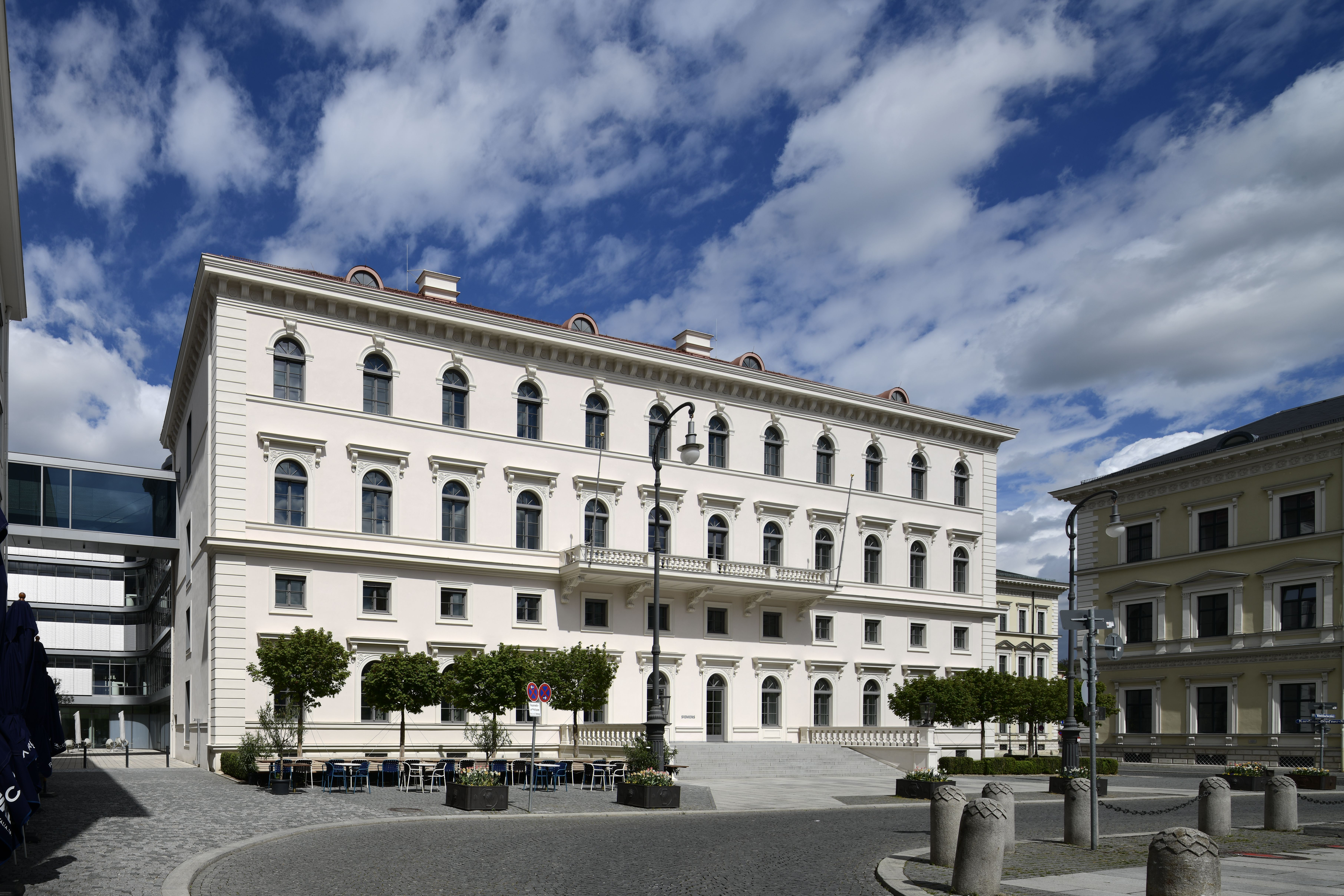
Palais Ludwig Ferdinand, seen from Wittelsbacherplatz

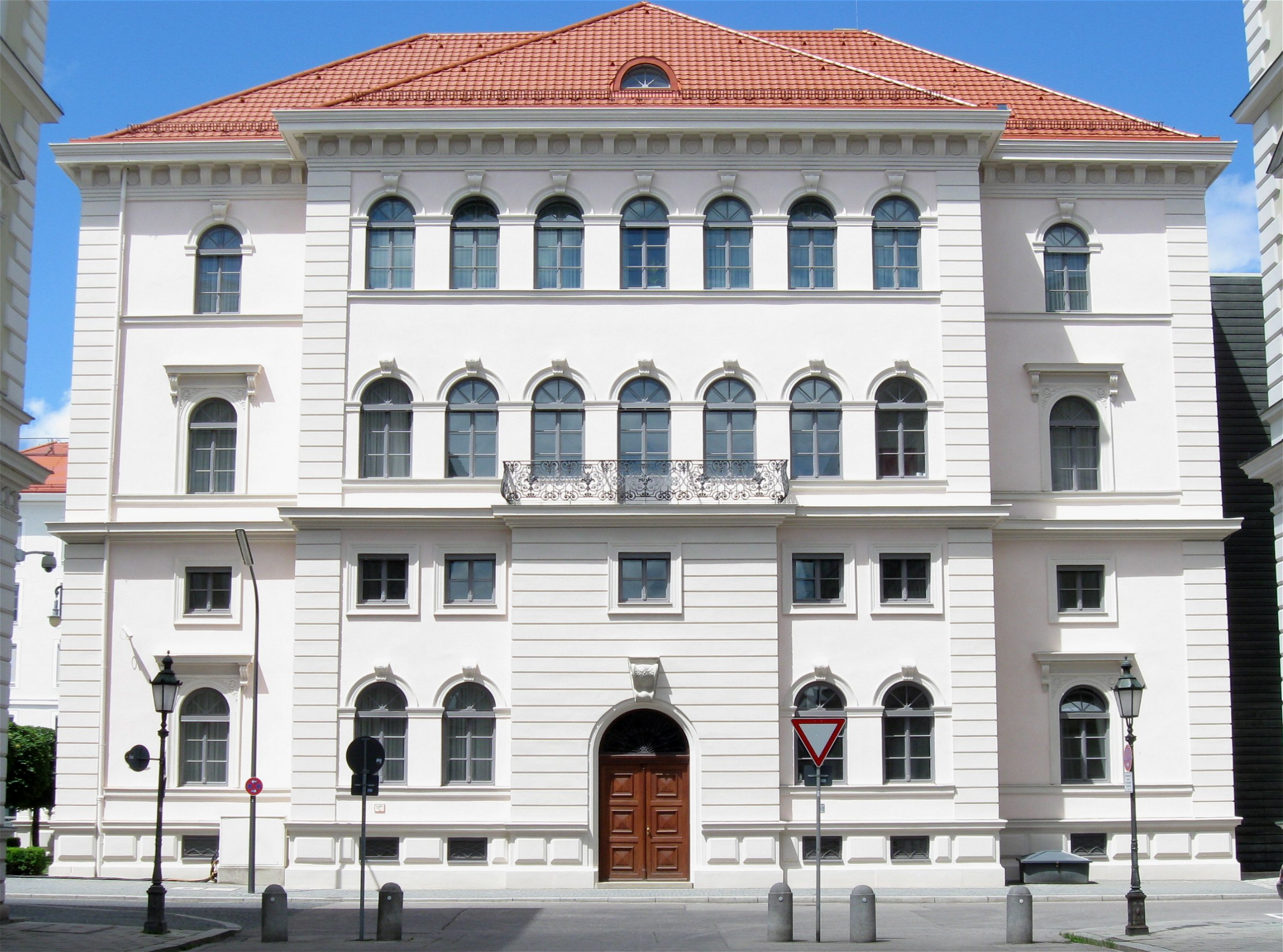
East façade of the palace, facing Odeonsplatz

The Palais Ludwig Ferdinand (also called the Alfons Palais and the Siemens Palais) is an early 19th-century palace in Munich, Germany, designed by Leo von Klenze. It is located on the Wittelsbacherplatz (at number 4) but forms part of an ensemble with the buildings on the west side of the Odeonsplatz. It was Klenze's own residence, then belonged to Princes Alfons and Ludwig Ferdinand of Bavaria. It is now the headquarters of Siemens.

The palace was built in 1825–26 for Karl Anton Vogel, a manufacturer of gold and silver thread, to a plan by Franz Xaver Widmann and with façades by Leo von Klenze, who lived on the piano nobile for 25 years. Klenze had originally intended the site for the first Protestant church in Munich, but that was later built elsewhere by Johann Nepomuk Pertsch. The east front of the palace is at the head of a short unnamed street which branches off the Odeonsplatz, between the Odeon and the Palais Leuchtenberg, which Klenze had previously designed with identical exteriors, so that on that side the three form an ensemble. This was originally the main façade of the building, designed by Klenze with a projecting central bay and a balcony above the main entrance, and with details echoing his Bazar building directly across the Odeonsplatz. Around 1850, the building was extended to the west.

From 1878 the building belonged to Princes Alfons and Ludwig Ferdinand of Bavaria, from whom its older names are derived. Ludwig Ferdinand had it remodelled, and around 1900 the façade on Wittelsbacherplatz was embellished with arched doorways and a balcony.

The building was badly damaged in World War II. After reconstruction, it was rented in 1949 to Siemens & Halske, a predecessor of Siemens AG, who initially used it for their motor pool and casino business. After Prince Ludwig Ferdinand died in 1949, the cousins Hermann von Siemens and Ernst von Siemens, then chairman and CEO of their company, decided to buy it for the company's headquarters, as official seat of the management board and the supervisory board, and in 1957 finalized the sales contract with the prince's heirs. Those leading institutions of Siemens still today reside in this house. A staircase was added on the Wittelsbacherplatz side in 1968. The building and vast adjacent new wings, occupying the whole block between Finken Str., Kardinal Doepfner Str. and Oskar-von-Miller Ring, including the SiemensForum München, underwent thorough renovation until 2016.
