= Siemon =

Siemon may refer to:

- Siemon (name)
- The Siemon Company, American telecommunications company
