= Carl Friedrich von Siemens =

German Entrepreneur and politician

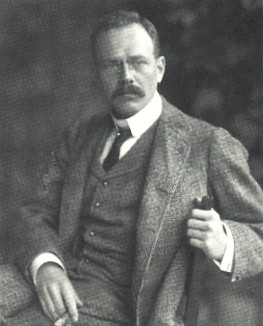
- Photograph by Jacob Hilsdorf
- Born: 5 September 1872; Berlin, Germany
- Died: 9 September 1941 (aged 69)

Carl Friedrich von Siemens (5 September 1872, in Berlin – 9 September 1941, in Heinendorf, near Potsdam) was a German Entrepreneur and politician. A member of the Siemens family, he became associated with Siemens & Halske AG in 1899, his family company. He was responsible for the resurrection of the Siemens Group after the First World War. Before his death in 1941, he oversaw state railways for the Reichstag.

== Biography ==
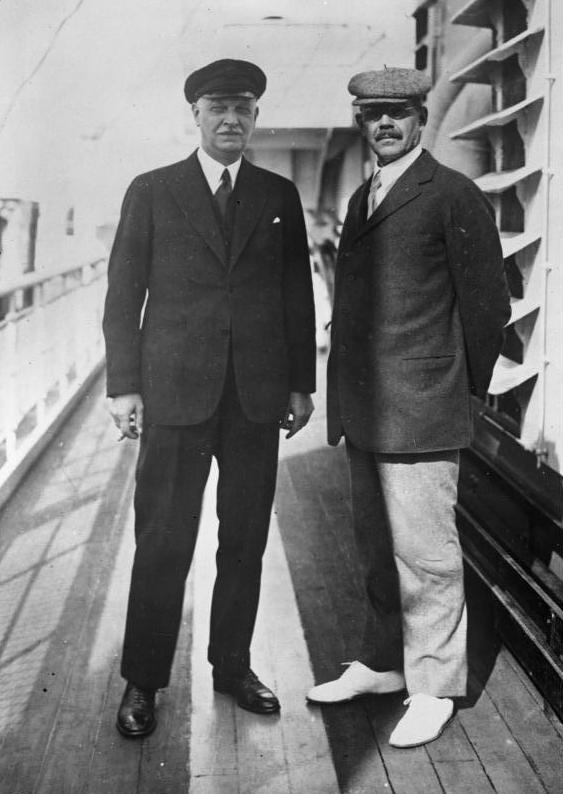
Carl Friedrich von Siemens (right) with Wilhelm Cuno, director of the Hapag shipping company and former Chancellor of Germany, on their way to New York in 1931

Carl Friedrich von Siemens was born 5 September 1872 in Berlin. Carl Friedrich is the youngest son of Werner von Siemens by his second wife and relative Antonie Siemens and nephew of Carl Siemens and William Siemens.

In 1899, Carl Friedrich von Siemens joined the Siemens & Halske AG which was founded by his father and was then led by his elder brothers (today Siemens AG). From 1901 to 1908, Siemens was a director of the British filial Siemens Brothers & Co in London and Siemens Brothers Dynamo Works in Stafford. From 1908 to 1912 he established and led the so-called Übersee-Abteilung which was responsible for the company's activities abroad. He became CEO of the Siemens-Schuckertwerke in Berlin in 1912 and chairman of the supervisory board of both Siemens-Schuckertwerke and Siemens & Halske AG in 1919. In this position he was responsible for the resurrection of the Siemens Group after the First World War. Upon his death in 1941 he was succeeded in both chairmanships by his late brother Arnold von Siemens's eldest son Hermann von Siemens.

Apart from his business activities, Carl Friedrich von Siemens was engaged in several organisations. In 1919 he financed the far-right Anti-Bolshevik Fund. From 1920 to 1924 he was member of the Reichstag for the Deutsche Demokratische Partei. From 1924 to 1934 Siemens was chairman of the administrative board of the German State Railways (Deutsche Reichsbahn-Gesellschaft). He died 9 September 1941 in Heinendorf near Potsdam and was buried at the Stahnsdorf South-Western Cemetery.

== Personal life ==
Married, he was the father of:

- Ernst Albrecht von Siemens
- Ursula von Siemens (25 August 1906, Kingston upon Thames – 1980), married on 19 August 1931 in Berlin to Hubert Nikolaus Ernst Gebhard Graf Blücher von Wahlstatt (19 September 1902, Radun – 13 May 1945, Troppau, in World War II), the parents of:
  - Nikolaus Gebhard 8.th Fürst Blücher von Wahlstatt (born 25 July 1932, Munich), married on 20 April 1955 in Reinscheid to Ursula Gromann (b. 4 November 1929, Essen), the parents of:
    - Livia Irene Gräfin Blücher von Wahlstatt (b. 8 October 1955, Kiel), unmarried and without any issue
    - Lukas Friedrich Gebhard Graf Blücher von Wahlstatt (b. 29 May 1956, Kiel), married on 1 September 1996 in Saint Martin, Guernsey, to Patricia Baronesse von Fircks (. 9 February 1967, Grafing), the parents of
      - Carl Philipp Johannes Gebhard Nikolaus (b. 26 December 1996, Starnberg)
      - Georg (b. 2 April 2000, Starnberg)
      - Alexandra (b. 6 December 2003, Starnberg)
  - Irene Gabriele Gräfin Blücher von Wahlstatt (8 August 1934, Guernsey – 8 August 1954, Guernsey), unmarried and without any issue
  - Sibylle Magdalene Gräfin Blücher von Wahlstatt (21 May 1937, Munich – 25 May 1994, Munich), unmarried and without any issue

== See also ==
- List of people from Berlin
