= Siemens locomotive of 1879 =

First electric passenger train

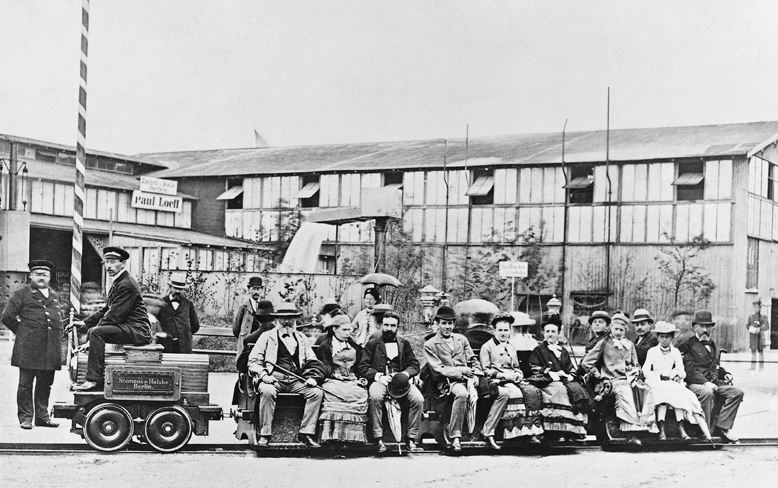
First electric locomotive by Siemens at the Berlin Trade Exhibition 1879

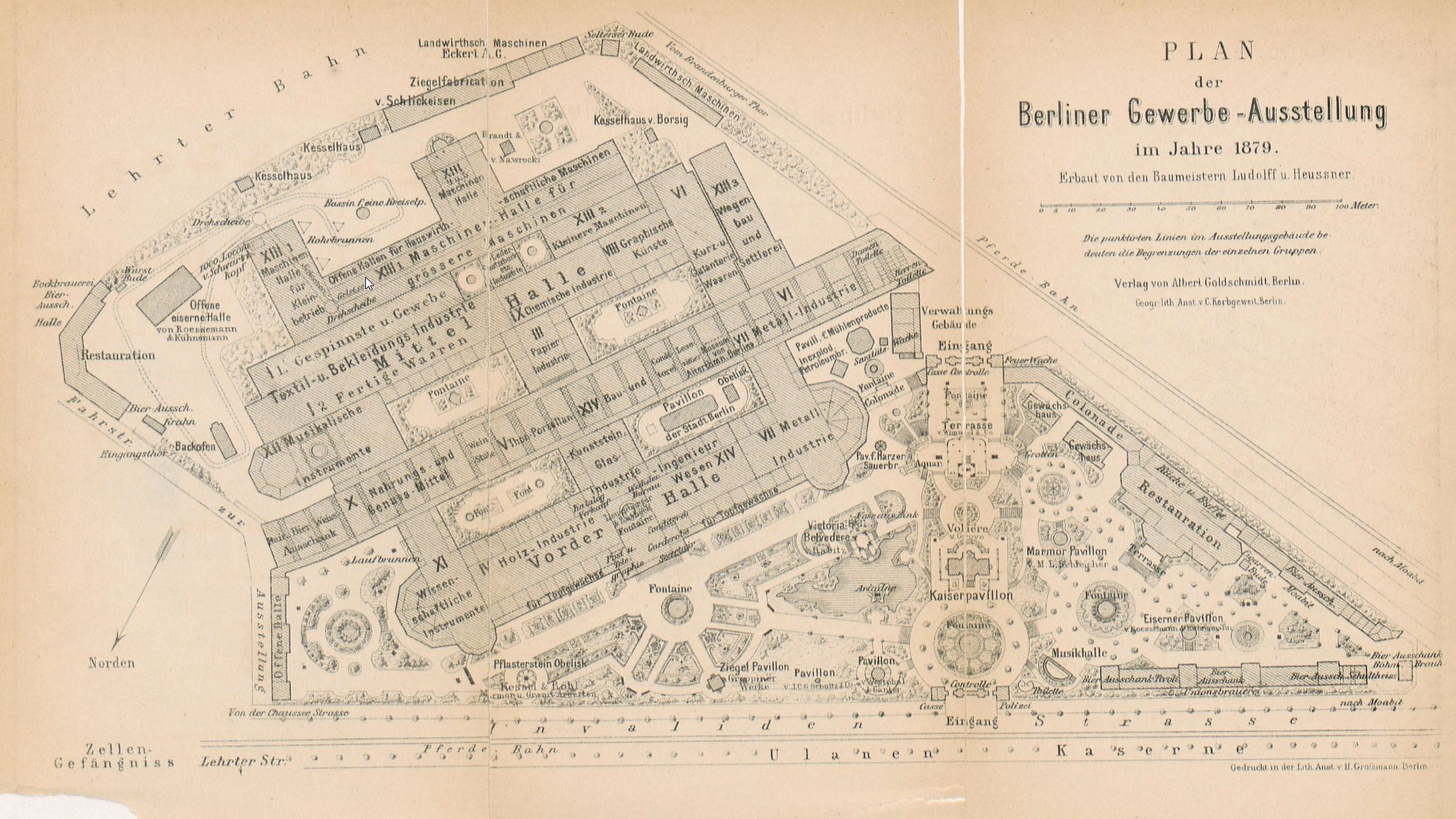
Map of the Berlin Trade Exhibition 1879, the circular track of the Siemens Railway is shown at the top left

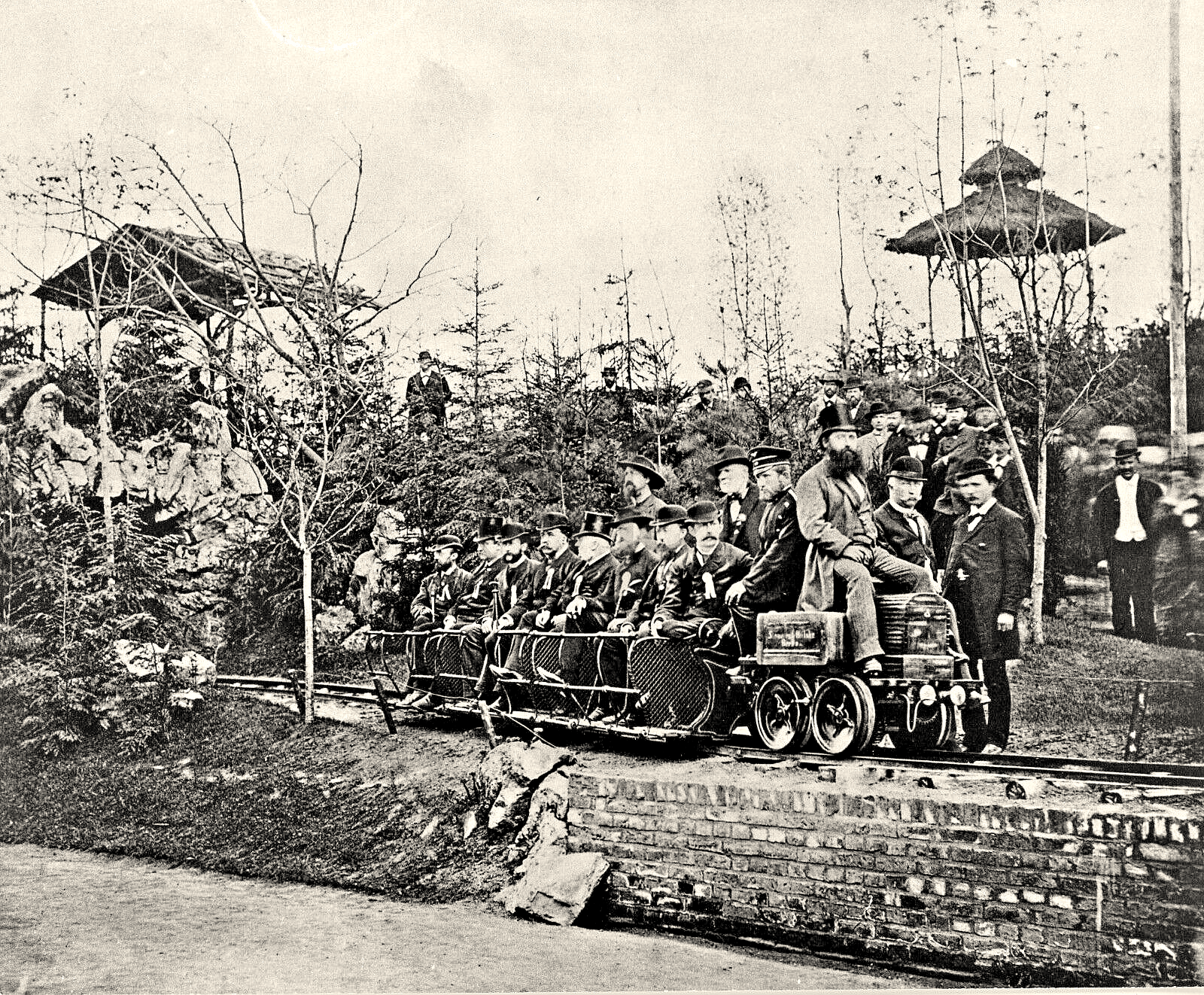
One of the first electric locomotives by Siemens on another exhibition railway at the Frankfurt Palmengarten in 1881

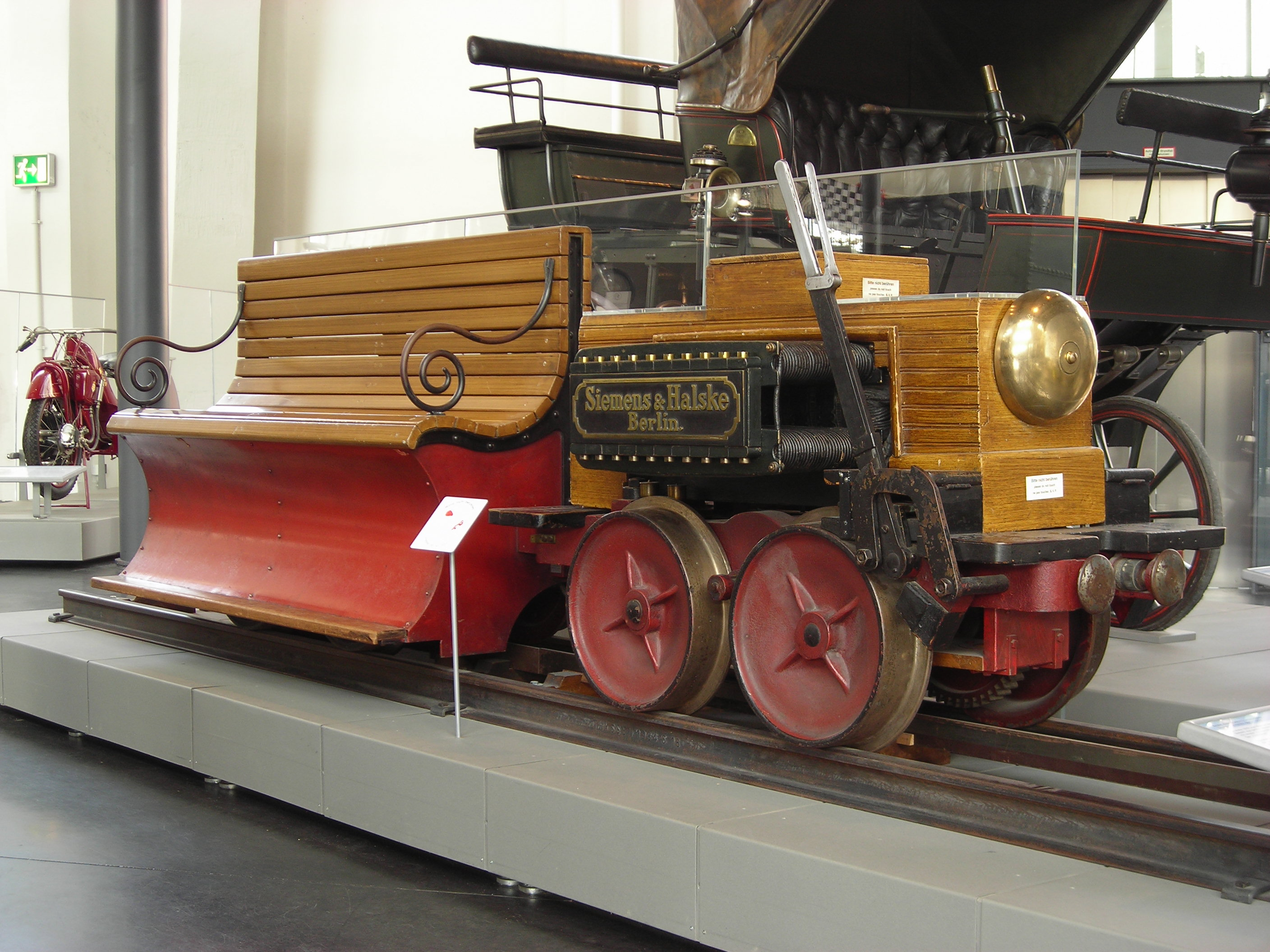
The Siemens locomotive from 1879 at the Deutsches Museum in Munich, 2007

The Siemens locomotive of 1879 was the first electric passenger train and the first electric locomotive powered by a generator. It was first presented at the Berlin Trade Exhibition 1879 by Werner von Siemens and transported exhibition visitors on an oval track.

== History ==
Werner von Siemens, ennobled in 1888, developed an electric generator, based on the dynamo-electric principle, which he patented in 1866. On January 17, 1867, he gave a lecture before the Berlin Academy of Sciences, in which he provided the first scientific description of the dynamo-electric principle. Based on these foundations, electric motors were built, initially used in stationary applications.

Siemens then tried to use the electric motor in vehicles and had his designer Hemming Wesslau design an electric locomotive for the Senftenberger Stadtgrube Marie III. However, the proposed design from July 1878, which aimed to drive the locomotive with two rubber discs on an iron band in the center, and subsequent adjustments did not convince the mine owner Carl Westphal. He doubted the reliability, was concerned about the investment costs, and could not reach an agreement with Siemens. No locomotive was built from these initial designs.

Siemens had the design of his electric locomotive further revised. Now the axles were driven via a gear transmission, and the iron band was used for power transmission. Based on a design from October 1878, a locomotive was built to be presented to the public at the Berlin Trade Exhibition 1879. This exhibition took place on the ULAP site at the Lehrter Bahnhof. A circular track about 300 meters long was built in the machine hall near the entrance. The small locomotive had three open passenger cars, each for six people. At the exhibition opening, Werner Siemens personally presented his development on May 31, 1879.

The electric railway was a highlight and a major attraction during the four-month-long Berlin Trade Exhibition. By September 30, 1879, a total of 86,398 people had been transported at a speed of 7 km/h.

The locomotive was operated with a direct current of 150 V. The electrical energy was transmitted via the two rails and an insulated iron band positioned in between. It had a rotor mounted along the longitudinal axis and side-mounted excitation coils. The track had a track gauge of 490 mm.

In the following years, this electric exhibition railway was also demonstrated in other cities. Interest was so great that Siemens had to build several similar railways. Exhibition locations included Brussels (for the 50th anniversary of Belgian independence in the Parc du Cinquantenaire 1880), London Sydenham (Crystal Palace 1880), Frankfurt am Main (General Patent and Sample Protection Exhibition in the Palmengarten 1881), Copenhagen (Tivoli Park 1882), and Moscow (All-Russian Industrial and Handicraft Exhibition 1882).

An original preserved locomotive is part of the collection at the Deutsches Museum in Munich. The German Museum of Technology in Berlin has a replica of the locomotive on display.
