= Georg Wilhelm von Siemens =

German telecommunications industrialist

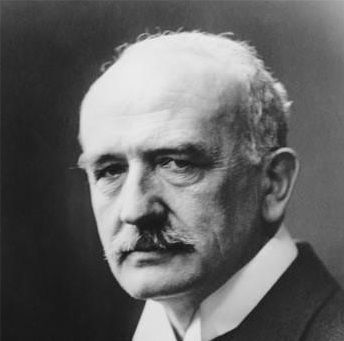
Wilhelm von Siemens (1855–1919)

Georg Wilhelm von Siemens (30 July 1855, in Berlin – 14 October 1919, in Arosa, Switzerland) was a German telecommunications industrialist of the Siemens family.

Known as Wilhelm von Siemens, he was the second son of Werner von Siemens by first wife Mathilde Drumann, and was a general partner of the family company Siemens. Then under the name Siemens & Halske (S & H), the company was incorporated in 1897, with Wilhelm's uncle Carl Heinrich von Siemens as its first chairman of the Supervisory Board. Wilhelm's elder brother Arnold von Siemens succeeded his uncle as chairman of the board from 1904 until his death in 1918, while Wilhelm was chairman of the board of the sister company, Siemens-Schuckertwerke AG, from 1903 until 1918. After his brother Arnold's death in 1918, he succeeded him as chairman of Siemens & Halske AG until his own death the following year. His successor in both chairmanships became his younger (half-)brother, Carl Friedrich von Siemens.

Married in 1882 to Eleonore Siemens (2 March 1860 – 26 July 1919), a first cousin, they were the parents of:

- Wilhelm Ferdinand von Siemens (1885–1937), who after World War I shortly was CEO of Siemens & Halske AG
- Mathilde Eleonore Eveline von Siemens (1888–1945)

He is credited with championing the Berlin to Iraq railway system that was to be completed about 1915. The direct competition such a railway system posed to British imperial domination could have been one of the causes of WW I. Beginning in 1899, he founded Siemensstadt, a locality of Berlin, in order to expand production by building new factories and workers' accommodation.
