= Siemsen =

Siemsen is a surname. Notable people with the surname include:

- Hans Siemsen (1891–1969), German writer and journalist
- Remy Siemsen (born 1999), Australian soccer player

== See also ==
- Siemens (surname)
