= Hermann von Siemens =

German industrialist

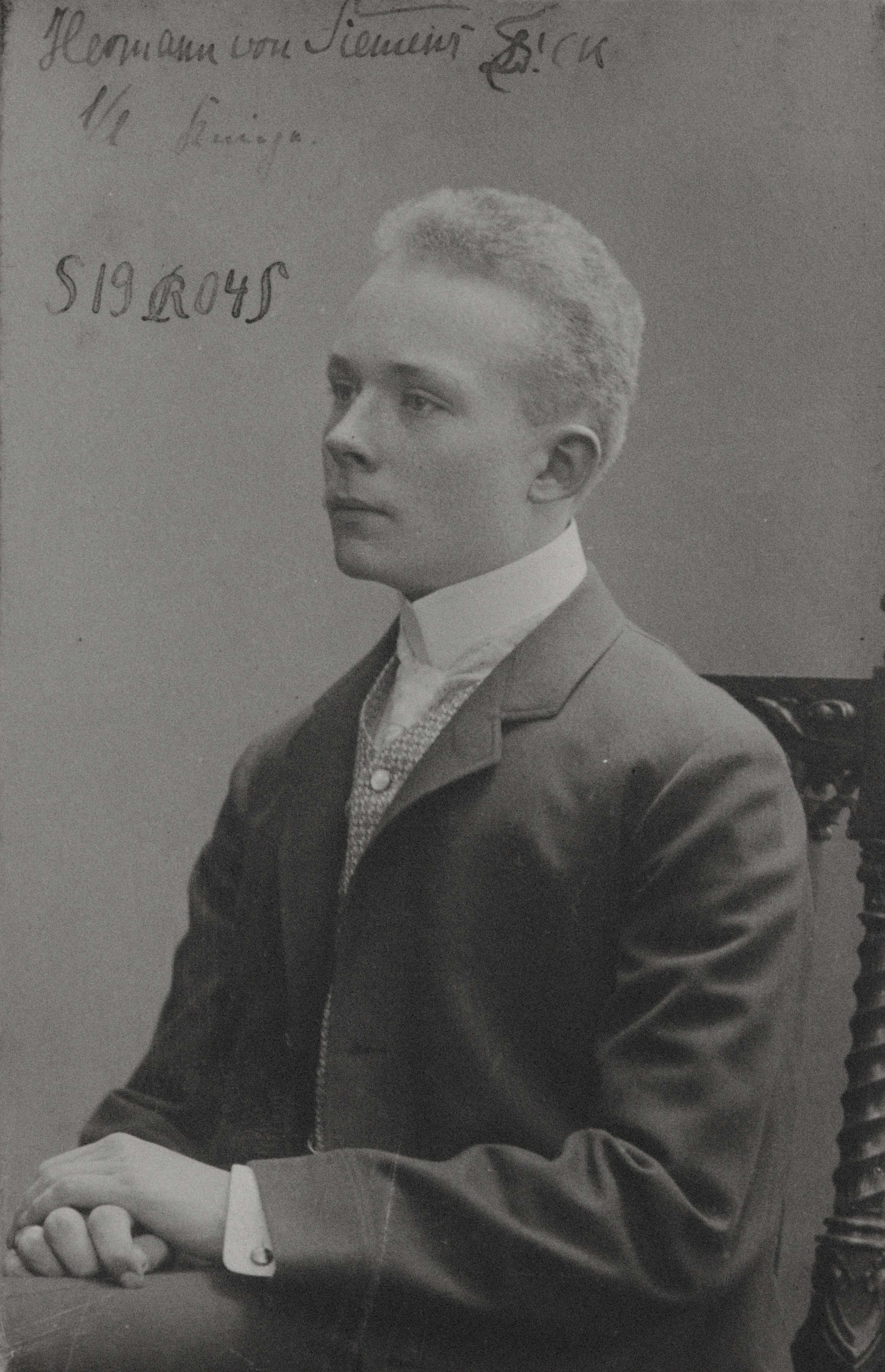
- Hermann von Siemens as a member of student fraternity Leonensia in Heidelberg (1904)
- Born: 9 August 1885; Berlin, Germany
- Died: 13 October 1986 (aged 101); Munich, Germany
- Education: Heidelberg University
- Occupation: Industrialist
- Years active: c. 1928–c. 1970s
- Known for: Siemens; Siemens-Schuckert; Siemens Foundation
- Board member of: Siemens-related entities; Vereinigte Stahlwerke; Mannesmann; Krupp; Deutsche Bank; Fraunhofer Society (1955–1964)
- Spouse: Charlotte von Maltzan (m. 1917)
- Children: 6
- Parents: Arnold von Siemens (father); Ellen, née von Helmholtz (mother)
- Relatives: Werner von Siemens (grandfather); Carl Friedrich von Siemens (uncle); Ernst von Siemens (cousin)
- Family: Siemens family

Hermann von Siemens (9 August 1885 in Berlin – 13 October 1986 in Munich) was a German industrialist of the Siemens family.

== Life ==
He was the eldest son of Arnold von Siemens who himself was the eldest son of Werner von Siemens, the famous inventor and founder of Siemens & Halske, later to become the present-day Siemens. Hermann's mother Ellen, née von Helmholtz, was a daughter of Werner's close friend Hermann von Helmholtz, after whom his grandson was named. He was the eldest of five children.

After studying physical chemistry at Heidelberg University and becoming PhD, Hermann von Siemens started his career as an employee of the physical-chemical laboratory of Siemens & Halske, Berlin. In Heidelberg, Siemens joined the student fraternity Leonensia. In 1928 he became a member of the management board of Siemens & Halske. In 1929 he took over responsibility for the central laboratory of the company. He significantly contributed to the development of teleprinters. In 1935 he became member of the management board of a sister company, Siemens-Schuckert. He also became a member of the supervisory boards of Vereinigte Stahlwerke, Mannesmann, Krupp and Deutsche Bank.

Before 1933 he was a member of the German National People's Party, a rival and opponent of Hitler's National Socialist German Workers' Party. From 1941 until 1946 he succeeded his uncle Carl Friedrich von Siemens as chairman of the Supervisory Boards of Siemens & Halske AG and Siemens-Schuckertwerke AG and thus became head of the German electrical and electronics company. As head of a company important for the production of war materials, the German government enqueued him among the "Wehrwirtschaftsführer". Siemens-Schuckert had to employ some skilled labor among deported people inside and outside of concentration camps. During the final years of World War II, numerous plants and factories in Berlin and other major cities were destroyed by Allied air raids. To prevent further losses, manufacturing was moved to alternative places and regions not affected by the air war. The goal was to secure continued production of important war-related and everyday goods. According to records, Siemens was operating almost 400 alternative or relocated manufacturing plants at the end of 1944 and in early 1945.

Arrested on 5 December 1945 by Allied Forces, he temporarily ceded the chairmanships to his father's first cousin Friedrich Carl Siemens (1877–1952). He was brought to the Nuremberg trials as a prisoner to deal with war crime charges, but finally no prosecution was filed, as there were no personal misdeeds traceable. The charges were dropped, so he could return as head of company in 1948.

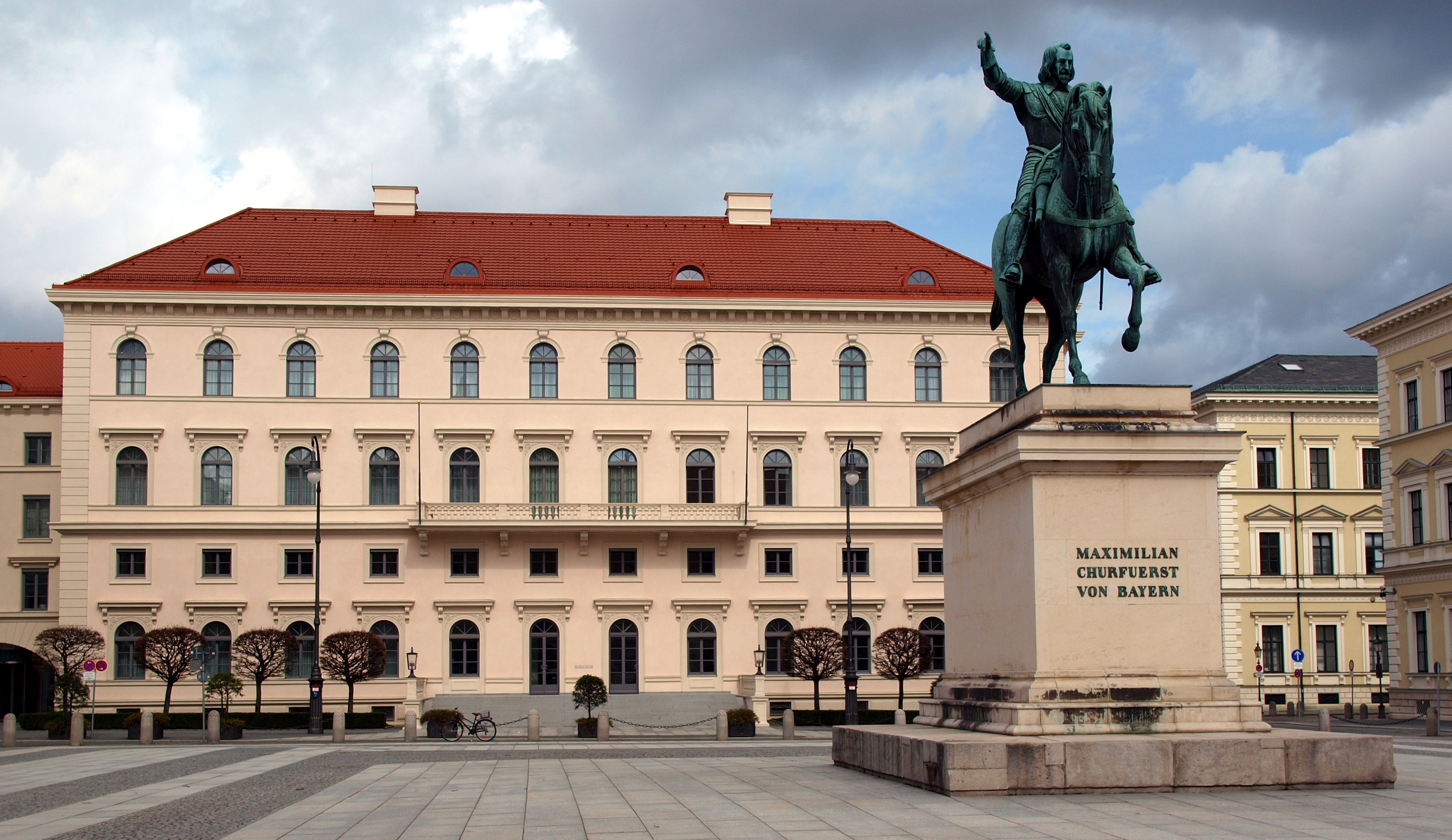
Siemens' headquarters, Munich, at Palais Ludwig Ferdinand

He again served as chairman of the supervisory boards of Siemens & Halske AG and Siemens-Schuckertwerke AG until his retirement in 1956. All factories in the Soviet occupation zone as well as most factories abroad were lost and had to be replaced. During this period of time, his first cousin Ernst von Siemens was CEO of Siemens & Halske AG from 1949 until 1956 and eventually succeeded Hermann as chairman of both companies in 1956. Because of the Berlin Blockade, Hermann and Ernst shifted the headquarters of Siemens from sieged Berlin to Erlangen, the production site of Siemens-Schuckert, in 1947 and to Munich in 1949. There they rented the Palais Ludwig Ferdinand from the former Bavarian Royal Family and eventually bought it in 1957. The palace still today continues to house the Siemens headquarters. In 1950, Hermann von Siemens donated his parents' sumptuous residence at Wannsee in Berlin to the Baptist Church which converted it to a hospital.

Hermann von Siemens significantly contributed to the company's reconstruction and development after World War II. Himself rather a silent, introverted and technical-oriented person, he took special interest in all matters of scientific research and enhanced it in many ways. In the 1950s and from their new base in Bavaria, S&H started to manufacture computers, semiconductor devices, washing machines, and pacemakers. From 1955 until 1964 Hermann von Siemens also served as president of the scientific Fraunhofer Society. After Ernst von Siemens merged the three parent companies Siemens & Halske, Siemens-Schuckert and Siemens-Reiniger to form the present-day Siemens in 1966, Hermann continued to be an ordinary member, later an honorary member of the supervisory board until his death in 1986 at the age of 101.

In 1917, he married Charlotte von Maltzan, Baroness zu Wartenberg und Penzlin; they had six children and 12 grandchildren, among them the granddaughter Nathalie von Siemens (b. 1971), formerly chairperson of the Siemens Foundation and since 2015 a member of the supervisory board of Siemens AG.
