= Siemensia =

Scientific classification
- Kingdom: Plantae
- Clade: Tracheophytes
- Clade: Angiosperms
- Clade: Eudicots
- Clade: Asterids
- Order: Gentianales
- Family: Rubiaceae
- Genus: Siemensia; Urb.
- Species: S. pendula

Binomial name
- Siemensia pendula (C.Wright ex Griseb.) Urb.

Synonyms
- Portlandia pendula C.Wright ex Griseb.

Species of plants

Siemensia is a monotypic genus of flowering plants belonging to the family Rubiaceae. It only contains one known species, Siemensia pendula (C.Wright ex Griseb.) Urb.

Its native range is western Cuba.

The genus name of Siemensia is in honour of Werner von Siemens (1816–1892), a German electrical engineer, inventor and industrialist. Siemens's name has been adopted as the SI unit of electrical conductance, the siemens. He founded the electrical and telecommunications conglomerate Siemens. The Latin specific epithet of pendula means hanging. Both the genus and the species were first described and published in Symb. Antill. Vol.9 on page 143 in 1923.
