= Georg von Siemens =

German politician (1839–1901)

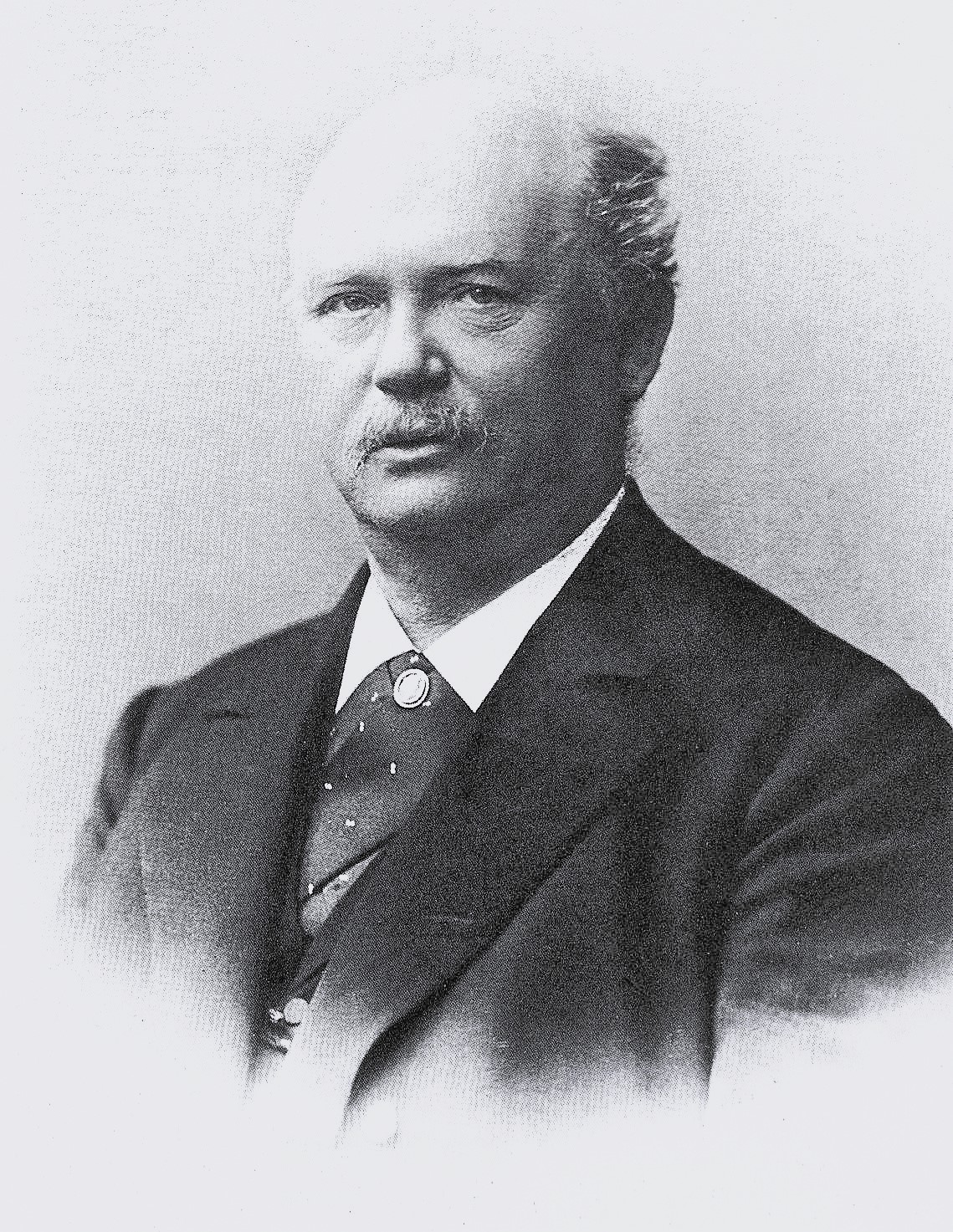
- Georg von Siemens (1895)
- Born: 21 October 1839; Torgau, Prussia
- Died: 23 October 1901 (aged 62); Berlin, German Empire

Georg von Siemens (21 October 1839 – 23 October 1901) was a German banker and liberal politician.

Georg von Siemens was the first managing director of Deutsche Bank from 1870 to 1900. Under his leadership, Deutsche Bank financed the establishment of many German industrial conglomerates, including BASF, Bayer, AEG and Mannesmann. Another priority was the financing of international railway projects, including the Northern Pacific and the Baghdad Railway.

From 1874 until his death, Siemens was elected several times into the German Reichstag. Until 1880, he represented the National Liberal Party. After the breakup of the National Liberals, Siemens joined various progressive parties, at first the Secession, from 1884 to 1893 the German Free-minded Party, and thereafter the Free-minded Union.

== Background ==
Georg von Siemens was born on 21 October 1839 to the lawyer Johann Georg Siemens and Marie Siemens (née von Sperl) in Torgau. Siemens was a second-degree nephew of the industrialists Werner von Siemens, William, and Carl von Siemens. His father provided most of the start-up funds of the later Siemens AG.

From 1857, Siemens studied law in Heidelberg, interrupted by his one-year military service in Berlin in 1858. After passing the state examination in 1860, Siemens worked as a clerk for the district courts in Jüterbog and Zossen. After transferring to Aachen in 1866, Siemens began advising Siemens, Halske & Co., the company of his uncle Werner von Siemens, before being drafted into the Rhenish Infantry Regiment for the German War. Siemens then worked as state examiner for Aachen.

== Indo-European Telegraph Company and Deutsche Bank ==
In 1867, Georg von Siemens established the Indo-European Telegraph Company in London on behalf of Werner Siemens. From 1868 to 1870, Siemens worked in Teheran, mediating between the British and Persian governments to secure Siemens, Halske & Co. the rights to income from the telegraph traffic.

In April 1870, Siemens returned to Berlin and was appointed founding director of Deutsche Bank. He then served as lieutenant of the 4th Brandenburg Infantry Regiment for the Franco-German War.

Under the leadership of Siemens and Hermann Wallich, Deutsche Bank became rapidly one of Germany's largest banks. In the early years, the bank focused on establishing foreign branches in London, Paris, New York City, Argentina, Uruguay, Shanghai, and Yokohama to finance international trade. Several were later liquidated due to financial difficulties. On the domestic market, however, Deutsche Bank took over a couple of competitors in the mid-1870s after the financial frenzy of the Gründerzeit had turned to bust, and was from then on considered one of the "big four" commercial banks of the German Empire (together with Disconto-Gesellschaft, Darmstädter Bank, and Dresdner Bank).

From the 1880s, Deutsche Bank shifted increasingly to financing the establishment of industrial conglomerates, and therefore played a key role in German industrialization. Moreover, as one of the first German banks, the bank strove to attract deposits, which broadened its financial means beyond the capital base.

Siemens died in 1901 of cancer. He was survived by his wife Elise Siemens (née Görz) and five daughters.
