= Johann Georg Halske =

German master mechanic (1814–1890)

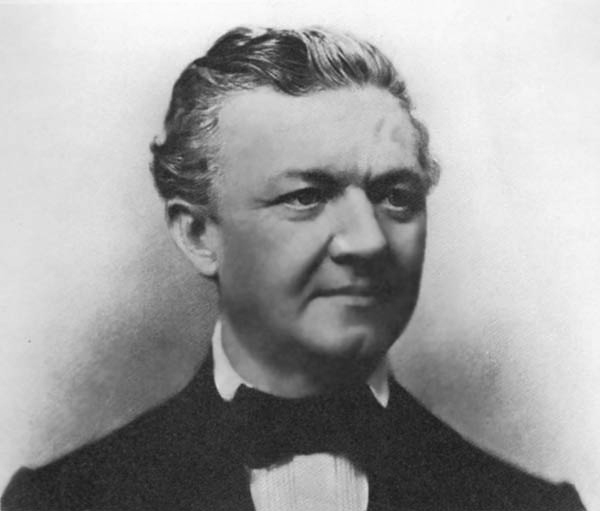
Johann Georg Halske

Johann Georg Halske (30 July 1814 – 18 March 1890) was a German master mechanic.

== Biography ==
Born in Hamburg, Halske started his own workshop in Berlin in 1844, which he ran together with his partner F. M. Böttcher. In 1847 Halske founded the Siemens & Halske Telegraph Construction Company together with Werner von Siemens. Halske was particularly involved in the construction and design of electrical equipment such as the press which enabled wires to be insulated with a seamless coat of gutta-percha, the pointer telegraph and the morse telegraph and measuring instruments. In 1867 he withdrew from the company because his views on company policy diverged from those of the Siemens brothers and devoted himself in his role as a Berlin city councillor to the administration of the city and the establishment of the Museum of Decorative Art. He remained friends with Werner von Siemens until Halske's death in 1890. Even after his departure, he continued to support the company and participated financially in the Siemens pension fund, founded in 1872.
