= Siemens & Halske =

Defunct German electrical equipment and engine manufacturer; now Siemens

Siemens & Halske AG
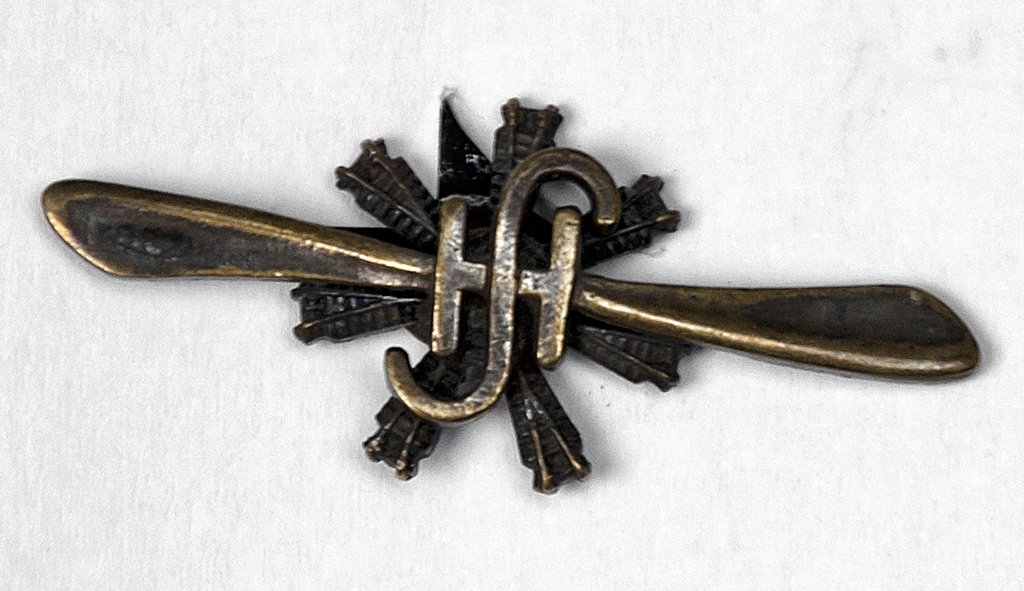
- Industry: Electrical engineering
- Predecessor: Duewag
- Founded: 1847; 179 years ago
- Founders: Werner von Siemens; Johann Georg Halske
- Defunct: 1966
- Fate: Merged with Siemens
- Headquarters: Berlin, Germany
- Parent: Siemens

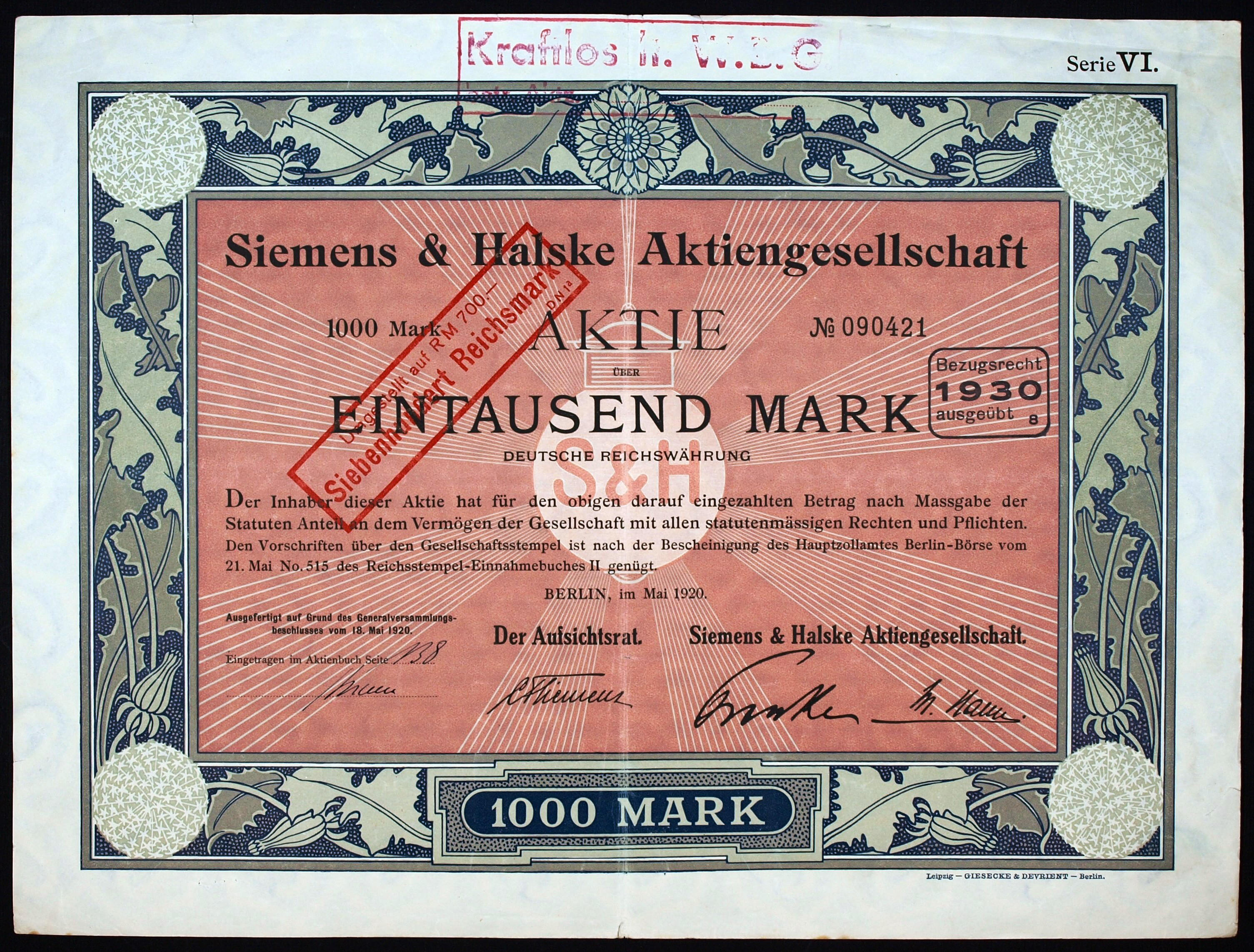
Share of the Siemens & Halske AG, issued May 1920

Siemens & Halske AG (or Siemens-Halske) was a German electrical engineering company that later became part of Siemens. It was founded on 12 October 1847 as Telegraphen-Bauanstalt von Siemens & Halske by Werner von Siemens and Johann Georg Halske. The company was located in Berlin-Kreuzberg.

== History ==
After its foundation in 1847, Telegraphen-Bauanstalt von Siemens & Halske specialised in manufacturing electrical telegraphs according to Charles Wheatstone's patent of 1837. In 1848, the company constructed one of the first European telegraph lines from Berlin to Frankfurt am Main. Siemens & Halske was not alone in the realm of electrical engineering. In 1887, Emil Rathenau had established Allgemeine Elektrizitäts-Gesellschaft (AEG), which became a long-time rival.

In 1881, Siemens & Halske built the Gross-Lichterfelde Tramway, the world's first electric streetcar line, in the southwestern Lichterfelde suburb of Berlin, followed by the Mödling and Hinterbrühl Tram near Vienna, the first electrical interurban tram in Austria-Hungary. 1882 saw the opening of the experimental "Elektromote" track, an early trolleybus concept in the Berlin suburb of Halensee. The rising popularity of telegraphs and electrical tramways, as well as in generators and electric motors, ensured steady growth for Siemens & Halske.

Werner von Siemens retired in 1890, while Johann Georg Halske had already left the company in 1867. Werner von Siemens' brother Karl Heinrich, together with Werner's sons Arnold and Georg Wilhelm, grew the firm and erected new Siemens & Halske premises along the banks of the western Spree river, in the Berlin suburb of Charlottenburg, in 1897. The firm's vast new site continued to grow, and from 1899 onwards it was known as Siemensstadt.

== International expansion ==
Siemens & Halske quickly expanded with representatives in Great Britain and Russia as well as its own cable-manufacturing plants at Woolwich and Saint Petersburg. The company's rise was supported by Werner von Siemens' patent of the electric generator (dynamo) in 1867.

=== British Empire ===
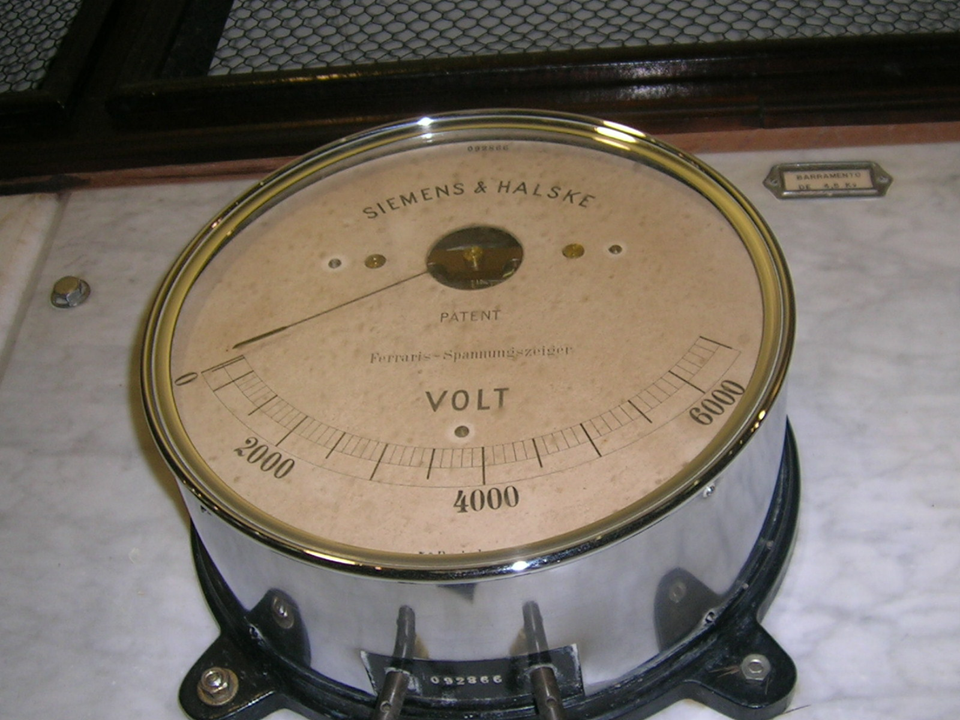
A legacy voltmeter from the Siemens & Halske

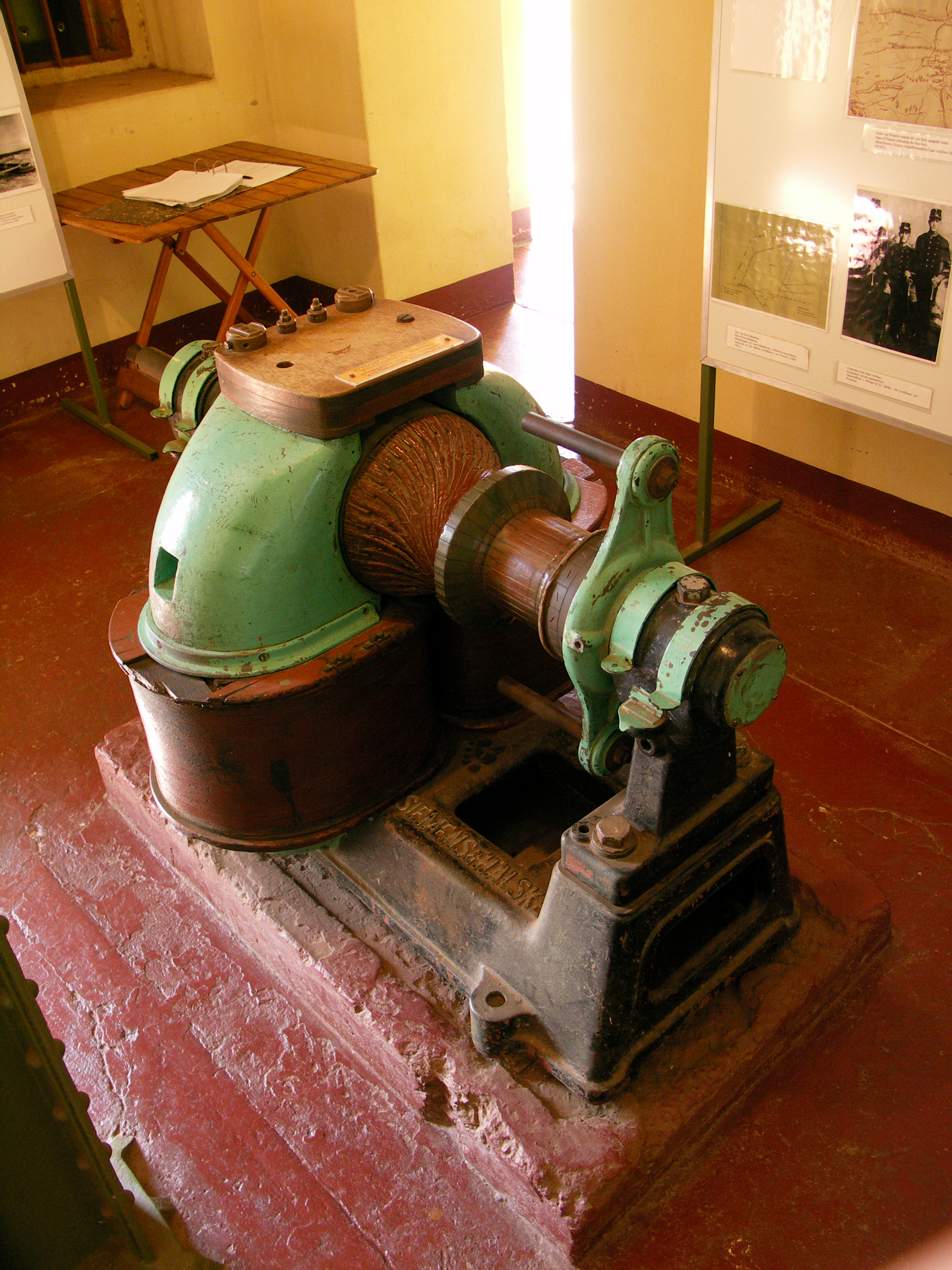
Siemens & Halske LH8 electric generator on display at Fort Klapperkop, Pretoria

Carl Wilhelm Siemens represented the company in Great Britain. They developed a cable-manufacturing plant in Woolwich.

=== Russian Empire ===
Carl Heinrich von Siemens represented the company in Russia. He established the Russian branch of the company in 1853, gaining a contract to build the telegraph system. In 1886 they obtained permission to establish the Obshchestvo Elektricheskogo Osveshcheniia (Company for Electric Lighting), also known as the 1886 Company.

== In the 20th century ==
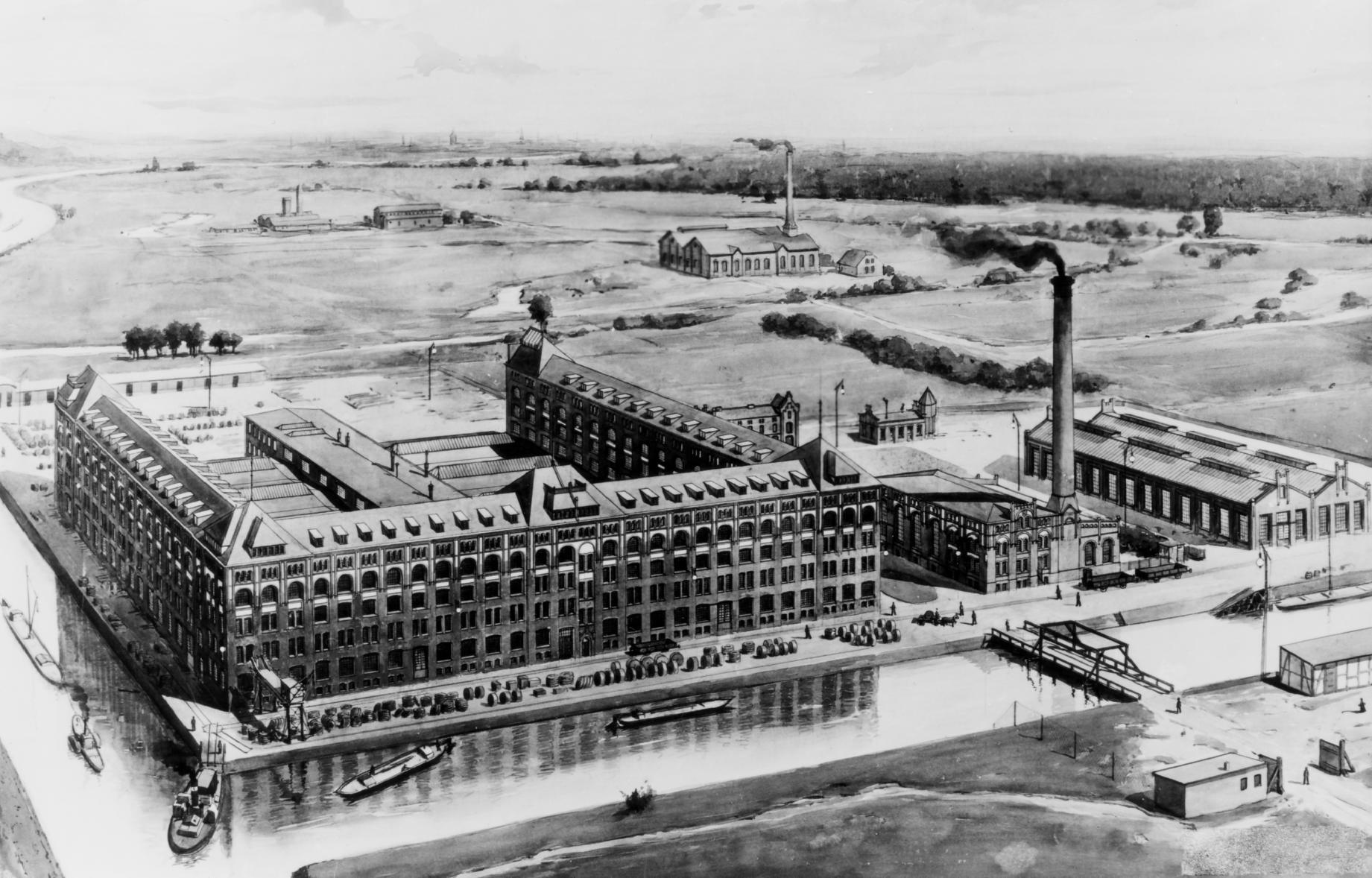
Siemens & Halske Cable Factory in Berlin-Siemensstadt around 1900

When Siemens & Halske merged parts of its activities with Schuckert & Co., Nuremberg in 1903 to become Siemens-Schuckert, Siemens & Halske AG specialized in communications engineering. During World War I, rotary engines of advanced and unusual design were produced under the Siemens-Halske brand, like the Siemens-Halske Sh.I and Sh.III. Siemens & Halske also produced large numbers of MG08/15 machineguns deployed for service of the Kaiser Imperial forces in World War I. Later, Siemens established several company subsidiaries for which the Siemens & Halske AG functioned as a holding company.

== Labour from slaves from Nazi concentration camps during World War II ==
During the Second World War, Siemens & Halske employed slave labour from concentration camps. Among other things, they were one of the companies that produced field telephones of the type "Feldfernsprecher 33".

== See also ==
- Siemens
- Siemens-Schuckert
