= Menzendorf =

- Municipality
- Location of Menzendorf within Nordwestmecklenburg district
- Interactive map of Menzendorf
- Location within Germany Location within Mecklenburg-Vorpommern
- Coordinates: 53°51′N 11°01′E
- Country: Germany
- State: Mecklenburg-Vorpommern
- District: Nordwestmecklenburg
- Municipal assoc.: Schönberger Land

Government
  - Mayor: Anke Goerke

Area
  - Total: 9.79 km^{2} (3.78 sq mi)
- Elevation: 38 m (125 ft)

Population (2025-12-31)
  - Total: 234
  - Density: 23.9/km^{2} (61.9/sq mi)
- Time zone: UTC+01:00 (CET)
  - Summer (DST): UTC+02:00 (CEST)
- Postal codes: 23923
- Dialling codes: 038828
- Vehicle registration: NWM
- Website: www.schoenberg-land.de

Menzendorf is a municipality in the Nordwestmecklenburg district of Mecklenburg-Vorpommern, Germany.

== People ==
- Carl Heinrich von Siemens (1829-1906), German entrepreneur and industrialist
