= Siemon (name) =

Siemon is both a surname and a masculine given name, a variant of Simon. People with the name include:

== Surname ==
- Gustav Siemon (1918–2011), German politician
- Jeff Siemon (1950–2026), former professional American football player
- Uwe Siemon-Netto (1936–2025), German international columnist

== Given name ==
- Siemon Allen, South African contemporary artist
- Siemon Muller (1900–1970), American paleontologist and geologist
