= Arnold von Siemens =

German telecommunications industrialist

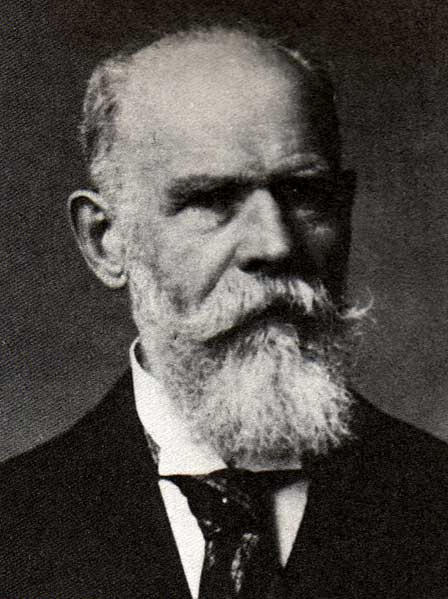
Arnold von Siemens.

Arnold von Siemens (13 November 1853 in Berlin – 29 April 1918 in Berlin) was a German telecommunications industrialist of the Siemens family, one of the successors on his family's company Siemens.

== Life ==
The eldest son of Werner von Siemens, inventor and founder of the Siemens & Halske electrical company, and his first wife (and cousin second times removed) Mathilde Drumann, took over the Vienna sales representation of his father's company in 1879 and established a production factory there in 1883. In 1887 he opened the company's first office in Japan. In 1892 he founded a factory for electrical locomotives in Chicago, in order to challenge General Electric's market leadership in the US. The factory however burnt down completely in August 1894.

When his father retired in 1890, Arnold succeeded him as CEO. Siemens & Halske (S & H) was incorporated in 1897, with Arnold's uncle Carl Heinrich von Siemens as its first chairman of the Supervisory Board. Arnold succeeded him as chairman of the board from 1904 until his death in 1918. His brother Georg Wilhelm von Siemens, until then chairman of the board of a sister company, Siemens-Schuckertwerke AG, succeeded him as chairman of Siemens & Halske AG.

Arnold married Ellen von Helmholtz, a daughter of his father's close friend Hermann von Helmholtz, and they became parents of five children, the eldest being Hermann von Siemens, later himself chairman.
