= Ernst von Siemens =

German industrialist

Ernst Albrecht von Siemens (9 April 1903 in Kingston upon Hull, England – 31 December 1990 in Starnberg) was a German industrialist.

== Life ==
Siemens was born in England when his father Carl Friedrich von Siemens was director of Siemens Brothers and returned to Germany after his father became head of Siemens-Schuckertwerke.

He studied physics at Technical University of Munich. He joined Siemens in 1929, beginning his career at the Werner Plant for Telecommunications in Berlin. After being a deputy member of the Managing Board of Siemens & Halske for five years starting in 1944, he became a full member in 1948 and was appointed chairman in 1949. In 1945 he became a deputy member of the Managing Board of Siemens-Schuckertwerke, and a full member in 1948. From 1956 to 1966, he served as chairman of the Supervisory Board of both companies, and from 1966 to 1971 as chairman of the Supervisory Board of Siemens AG. After stepping down as chairman, he remained an honorary member of the Supervisory Board until 1978. Von Siemens successfully faced the task of rebuilding the company after World War II. It was under his leadership that Siemens & Halske AG, Siemens-Schuckertwerke AG and Siemens-Reiniger-Werke AG were merged in 1966, forming the company we know today as Siemens AG.

Von Siemens was unmarried and had no children.

== Sponsor of culture and science ==
He established:

- the Carl Friedrich von Siemens Foundation (Carl Friedrich von Siemens Stiftung), for the advancement of the sciences (1958).
- the Ernst von Siemens Music Prize (1972).
- the Ernst von Siemens Art Foundation (1983). The goal of this foundation is to give financial support for museums to buy artworks. It also promotes exhibitions. Besides financial means, Ernst von Siemens also left the Foundation his private art collection.

He was a member of the Academic Alpine Club of Munich.
