= Carl Heinrich von Siemens =

German entrepreneur

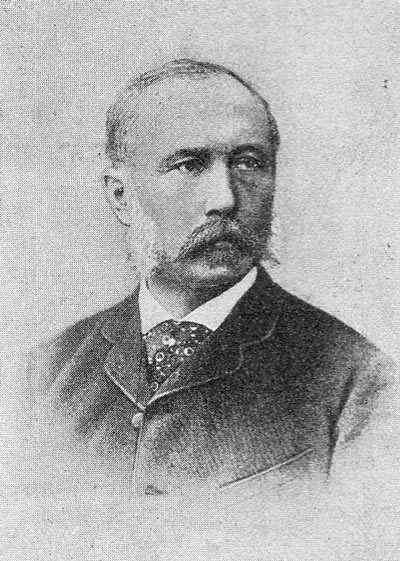
Carl Heinrich von Siemens

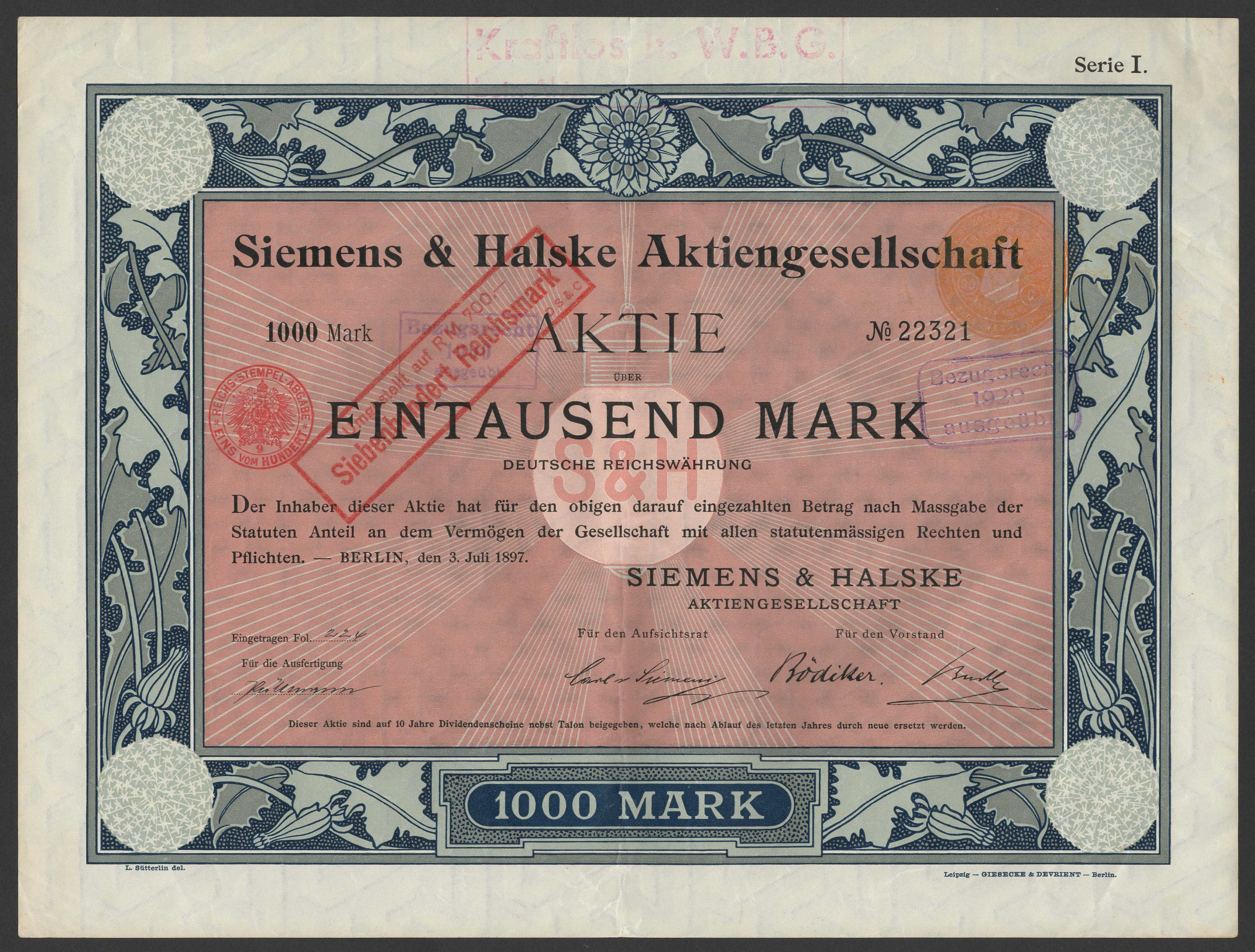
Share of the Siemens & Halske AG, signed by Carl Heinrich von Siemens as senior chief executive.

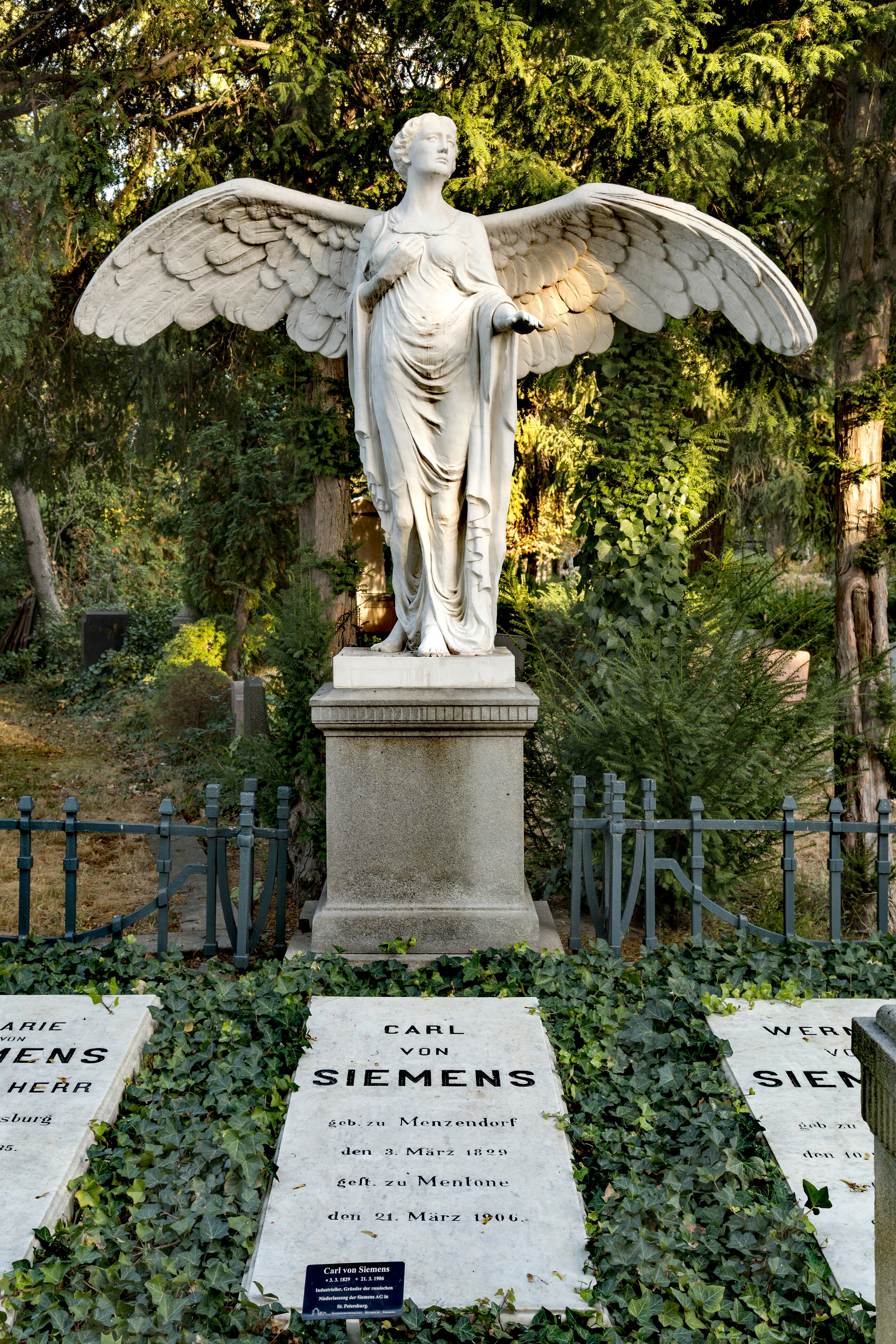
Siemens's grave in Berlin

Carl Heinrich von Siemens (often just Carl von Siemens) (3 March 1829 – 21 March 1906) was a German entrepreneur.

He was born in Menzendorf, Mecklenburg, one of the fourteen children of a tenant farmer of the Siemens family, an old family of Goslar, documented since 1384. He was a brother of Ernst Werner von Siemens and William Siemens, sons of Christian Ferdinand Siemens (31 July 1787 – 16 January 1840) and wife Eleonore Deichmann (1792 – 8 July 1839).

In 1853, Carl Siemens traveled to St. Petersburg where he established the branch office of his brothers company Siemens & Halske. Siemens had a contract for constructing the Russian telegraph network at the time.

Carl went to Britain in 1869, where he assisted his brother William. In the 1880s, he returned to Russia before he became the senior chief executive of Siemens & Halske after the death of his brother Werner in 1892. He resigned in 1904.

For his service to Russia, he was ennobled by Tsar Nicholas II in 1895. His grave is preserved in the Friedhof III der Jerusalems- und Neuen Kirchengemeinde (Cemetery No. III of the congregations of Jerusalem's Church and New Church) in Berlin-Kreuzberg, south of Hallesches Tor. He died in Menton, France.
