= Siemens =

German multinational conglomerate

Siemens AG

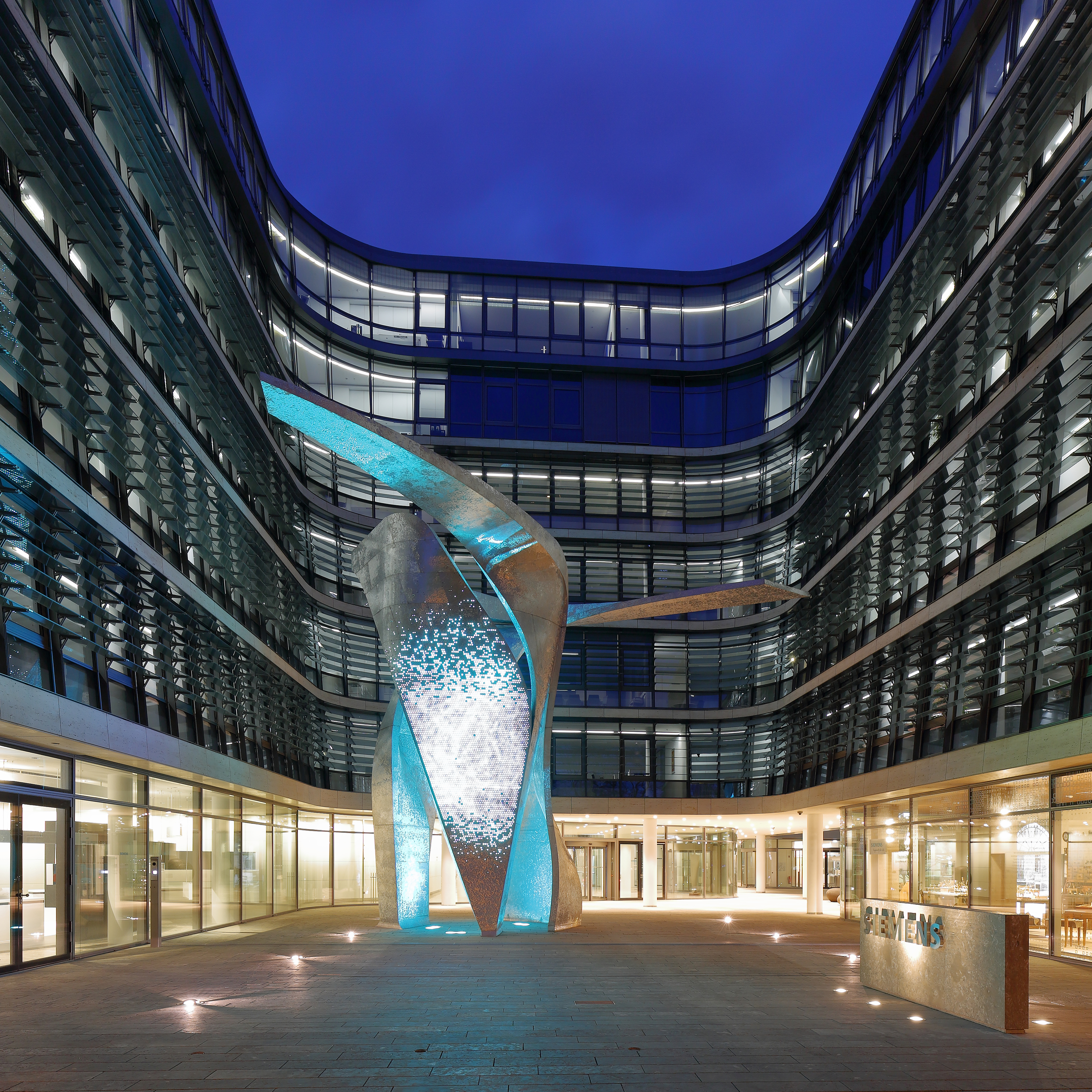
- Headquarters in Munich
- Type: Public
- Traded as: FWB: SIE; DAX component
- ISIN: DE0007236101
- Industry: Conglomerate; Industrial engineering; Automation; Electrical engineering; Medical technology
- Predecessors: Siemens & Halske; Siemens-Schuckert; Siemens-Reiniger-Werke
- Founded: 1 October 1847; 179 years ago Berlin, Kingdom of Prussia
- Founder: Werner von Siemens
- Headquarters: Munich, Germany
- Area served: Worldwide
- Key people: Roland Busch (CEO); Jim Hagemann Snabe (chairman)
- Products: Industrial automation systems; Industrial software; Drive technology; Building automation systems; Medical imaging equipment; Rolling stock and railway signalling; Power distribution equipment
- Services: Financial services; Mobility services and fleet management; Digital enterprise and IT services; Industrial maintenance and lifecycle services
- Revenue: ▲€78.91 billion (2025)
- Operating income: ▲€10.83 billion (2025)
- Net income: ▲€10.38 billion (2025)
- Total assets: ▲€166.2 billion (2025)
- Total equity: ▲€68.37 billion (2025)
- Owners: Siemens family (6.9%); Other shareholders (93.1%)
- Number of employees: 327,000 (2025)
- Divisions: Siemens Digital Industries; Siemens Smart Infrastructure; Siemens Mobility; Siemens Financial Services
- Website: siemens.com

Siemens AG (German pronunciation: [ˈziːməns] or [-mɛns]) is a German multinational company. It is focused on industrial automation, building automation, rail transport and health technology. Siemens is the largest engineering company in Europe, and holds the position of global market leader in industrial AI, automation, and industrial software.

The origins of the conglomerate can be traced back to 1847 to the Telegraphen Bau-Anstalt von Siemens & Halske established in Berlin by Werner von Siemens and Johann Georg Halske. In 1966, the present-day corporation emerged from the merger of three companies: Siemens & Halske, Siemens-Schuckert, and Siemens-Reiniger-Werke. Today headquartered in Munich and Berlin, Siemens and its subsidiaries employ approximately 320,000 people worldwide and reported a global revenue of around €78 billion in 2023. The company is a component of the DAX and Euro Stoxx 50 stock market indices. As of December 2023, Siemens is the second largest German company by market capitalization.

As of 2023, the principal divisions of Siemens are Digital Industries, Smart Infrastructure, Mobility, and Financial Services, with Siemens Mobility operating as an independent entity. Major business divisions that were once part of Siemens before being spun off include semiconductor manufacturer Infineon Technologies (1999), Siemens Mobile (2005), Gigaset Communications (2008), the photonics business Osram (2013), Siemens Healthineers (2017), and Siemens Energy (2020).

== History ==
=== 1847 to 1901 ===
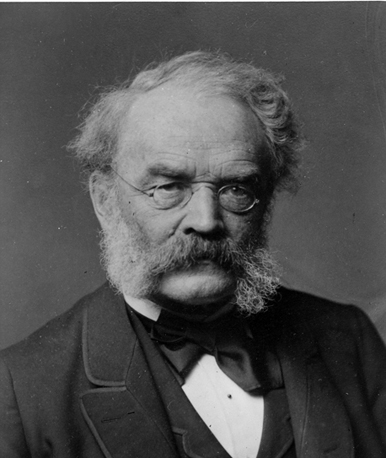
Werner von Siemens, co-founder of Siemens & Halske

Siemens & Halske was founded by Werner von Siemens and Johann Georg Halske on 1 October 1847. Based on the telegraph, their invention used a needle to point to the sequence of letters, instead of using Morse code. The company, then called Telegraphen-Bauanstalt von Siemens & Halske, opened its first workshop on 12 October.

In 1848, the company built the first long-distance telegraph line in Europe: 500 km from Berlin to Frankfurt am Main. In 1850, the founder's younger brother, Carl Wilhelm Siemens, later Sir William Siemens, started to represent the company in London. The London agency became a branch office in 1858. In the 1850s, the company was involved in building long-distance telegraph networks in Russia. In 1855, a company branch headed by another brother, Carl Heinrich von Siemens, opened in St Petersburg, Russia. In 1867, Siemens completed the monumental Indo-European telegraph line stretching over 11,000 km from London to Calcutta.

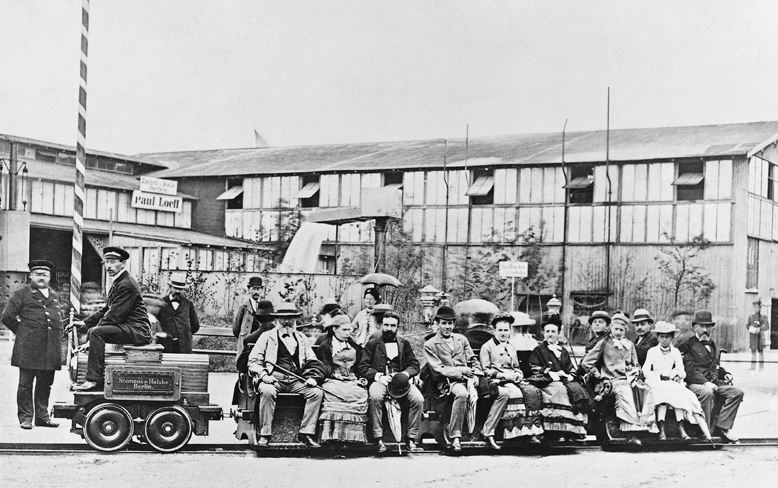
First electric locomotive, built in 1879 by company founder Werner von Siemens

In 1867, Werner von Siemens described a dynamo without permanent magnets.

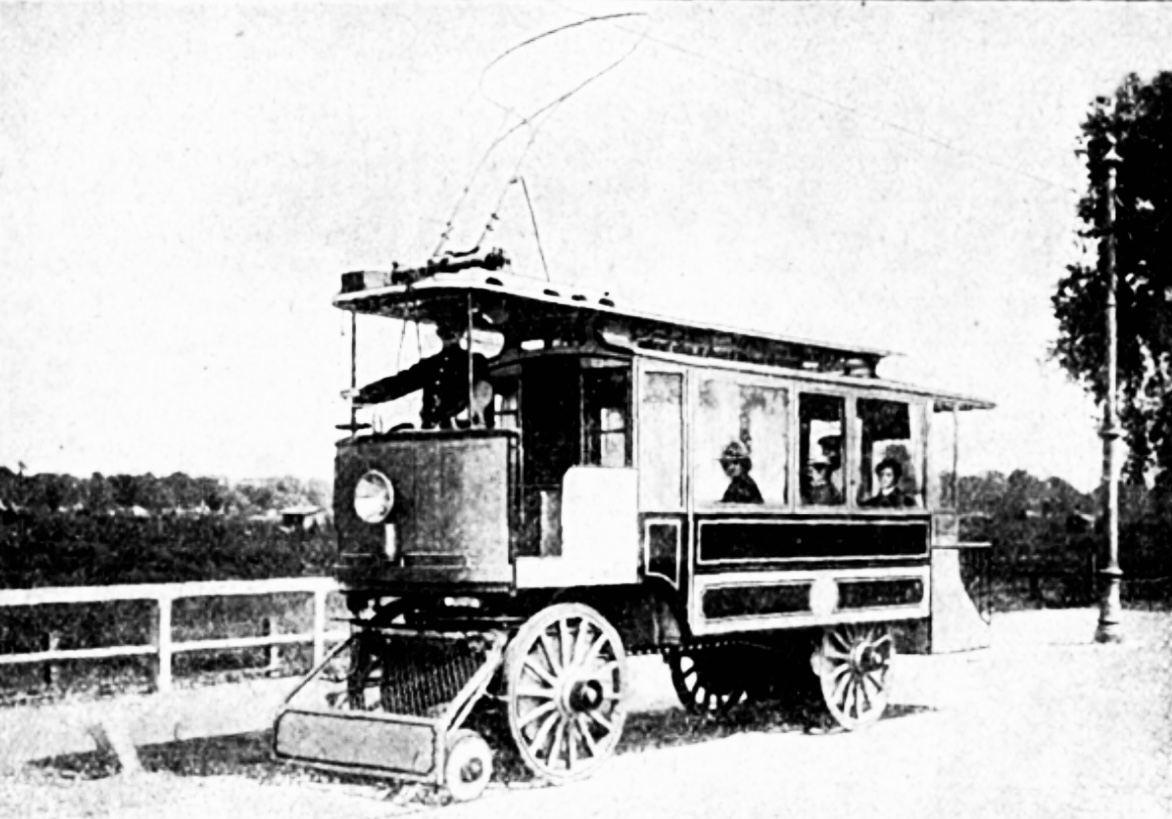
Siemens & Halske Omnibus 4x4HP; max. Speed 28 km/h (1899).

A similar system was also independently invented by Ányos Jedlik and Charles Wheatstone, but Siemens became the first company to build such devices. In 1881, a Siemens AC Alternator driven by a watermill was used to power the world's second to first electric street lighting in the town of Godalming, United Kingdom. The company continued to grow and diversified into electric trains and light bulbs. In 1885, Siemens sold one of its generators to George Westinghouse, thereby enabling Westinghouse to begin experimenting with AC networks in Pittsburgh, Pennsylvania.

In 1887, Siemens opened its first office in Japan. In 1890, the founder retired and left the running of the company to his brother Carl and sons Arnold and Wilhelm. In 1892, Siemens was contracted to construct the Hobart electric tramway in Tasmania, Australia, as it increased its markets. The system opened in 1893 and became the first complete electric tram network in the Southern Hemisphere.

=== 1901 to 1933 ===
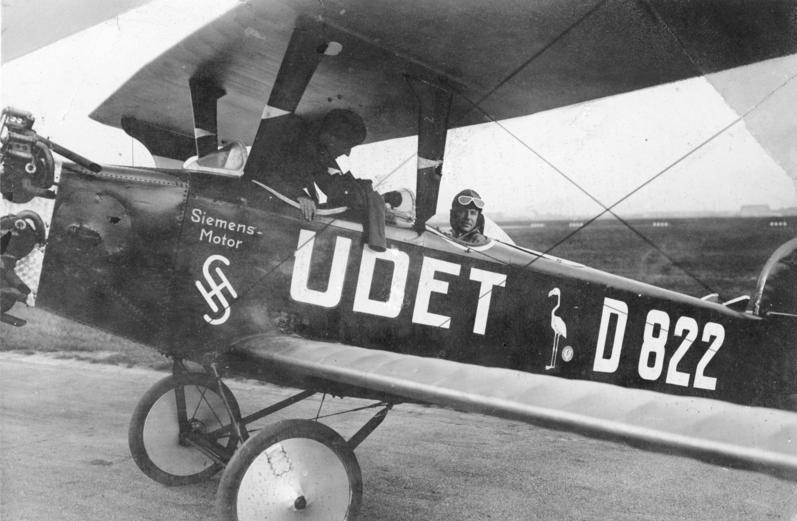
The company built airplanes during World War I, for example, this Siemens airplane in 1926 for Ernst Udet.

Siemens & Halske (S & H) was incorporated in 1897 and then merged parts of its activities with Schuckert & Co., Nuremberg, in 1903 to become Siemens-Schuckert. In 1907, Siemens (Siemens & Halske and Siemens-Schuckert) had 34,324 employees and was the seventh-largest company in the German empire by number of employees. (see List of German companies by employees in 1907)

In 1919, S & H and two other companies jointly formed the Osram lightbulb company.

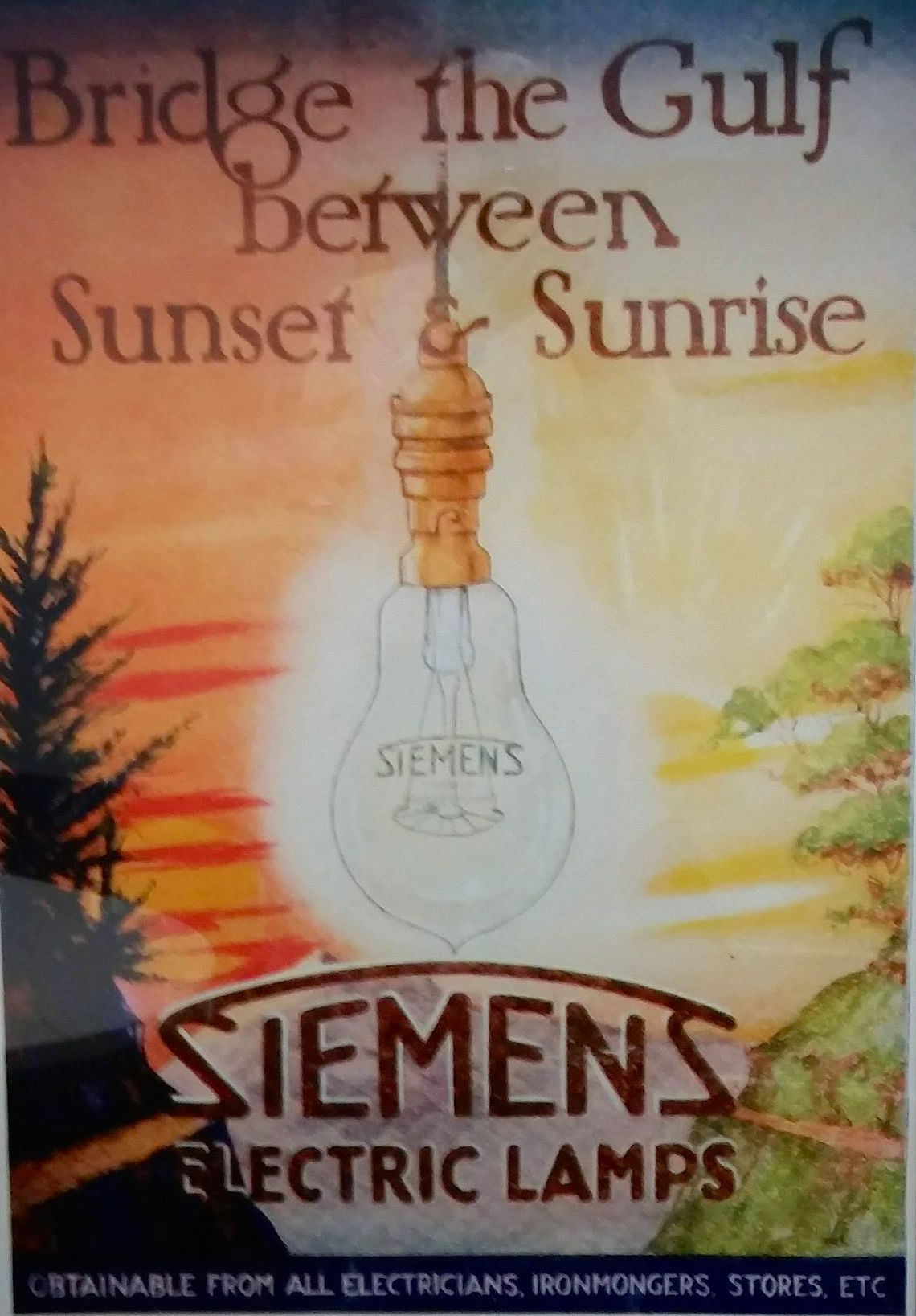
British Siemens advertisement from the 1920s

During the 1920s and 1930s, S & H started to manufacture radios, television sets, and electron microscopes.

In 1932, Reiniger, Gebbert & Schall (Erlangen), Phönix AG (Rudolstadt) and Siemens-Reiniger-Veifa mbH (Berlin) merged to form the Siemens-Reiniger-Werke AG (SRW), the third of the so-called parent companies that merged in 1966 to form the present-day Siemens AG.

In the 1920s, Siemens constructed the Ardnacrusha Hydro Power station on the River Shannon in the then Irish Free State, and it was a world first for its design. The company is remembered for its desire to raise the wages of its underpaid workers, only to be overruled by the Cumann na nGaedheal government.

=== 1933 to 1945 ===
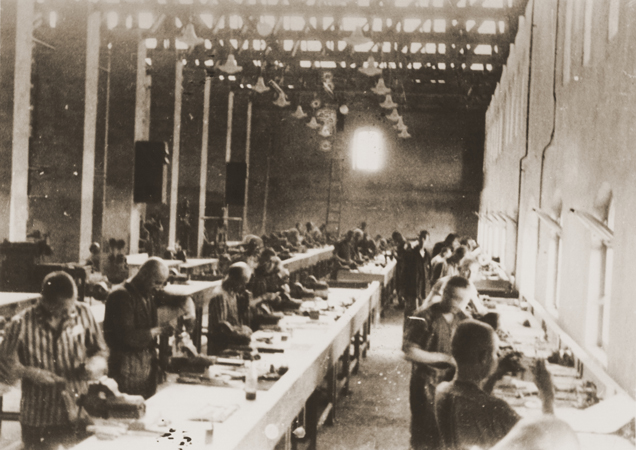
Prisoners around 1944 working at a Siemens factory in KZ Bobrek, a subcamp of Auschwitz concentration camp

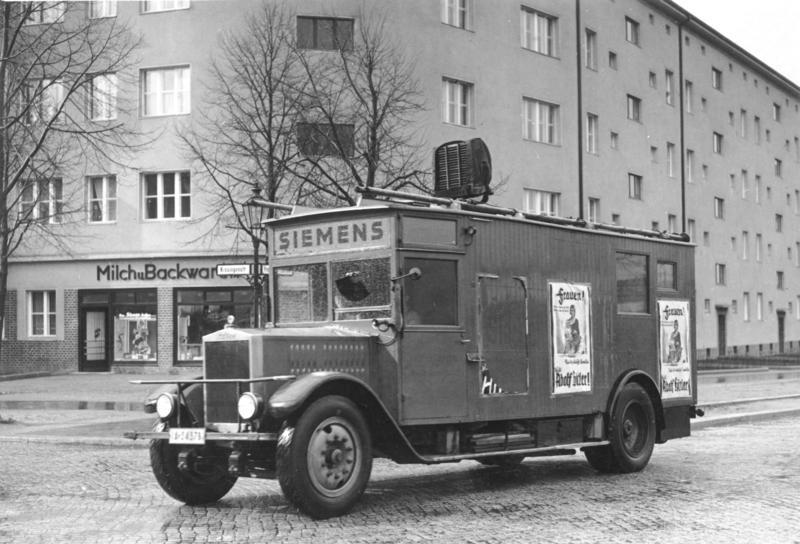
A Siemens truck being used as a Nazi public address vehicle in 1932

Siemens (at the time: Siemens-Schuckert) exploited the forced labour of deported people in extermination camps. The company owned a plant in Auschwitz concentration camp.

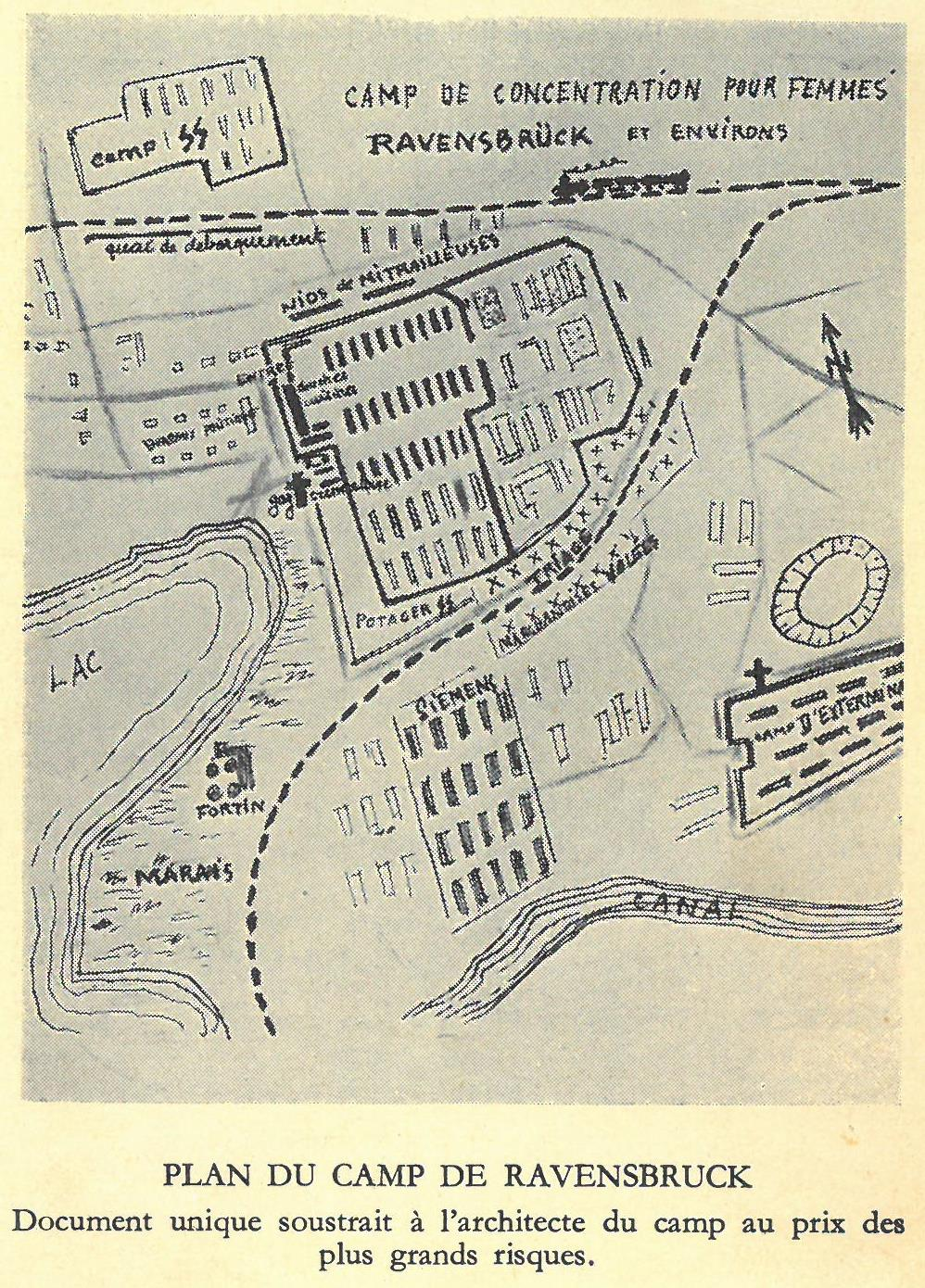
Siemens Factory and Ravensbrück concentration camp

Siemens exploited the forced labour of women deported to the Ravensbrück concentration camp; a Siemens factory was located in front of the camp.

During the final years of World War II, numerous plants and factories in Berlin and other major cities were destroyed by Allied air raids. To prevent further losses, manufacturing was therefore moved to alternative places and regions not affected by the air war. The goal was to secure continued production of important war-related and everyday goods. According to records, Siemens was operating almost 400 alternative or relocated manufacturing plants at the end of 1944 and in early 1945.

In 1972, Siemens sued German satirist F.C. Delius for his satirical history of the company, Unsere Siemens-Welt, and it was determined much of the book contained false claims although the trial itself publicized Siemens's history in Nazi Germany. The company supplied electrical parts to Nazi concentration camps and death camps. The factories had poor working conditions, where malnutrition and death were common. Also, the scholarship has shown that the camp factories were created, run, and supplied by the SS, in conjunction with company officials, sometimes high-level officials.

=== 1945 to 2001 ===
In the 1950s, and from its new base in Bavaria, S&H started to manufacture computers, semiconductor devices, washing machines, and pacemakers. In 1966, Siemens & Halske (S&H, founded in 1847), Siemens-Schuckertwerke (SSW, founded in 1903) and Siemens-Reiniger-Werke (SRW, founded in 1932) merged to form Siemens AG. In 1969, Siemens formed Kraftwerk Union with AEG by pooling their nuclear power businesses.

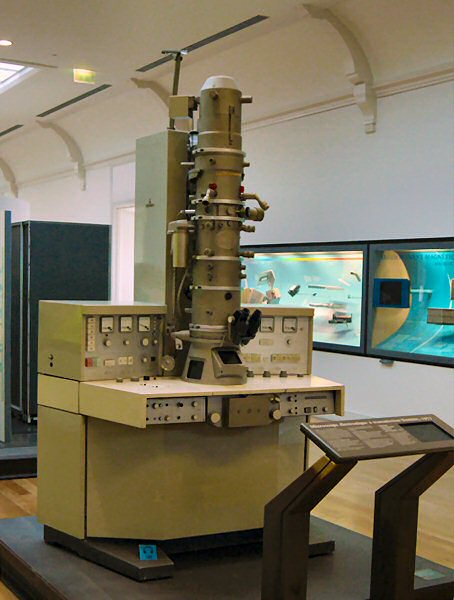
A 1973 Siemens electron microscope on display at the Musée des Arts et Métiers in Paris

The company's first digital telephone exchange was produced in 1980, and in 1988, Siemens and GEC acquired the UK defence and technology company Plessey. Plessey's holdings were split, and Siemens took over the avionics, radar and traffic control businesses—as Siemens Plessey.

In May 1962, Siemens-Halske agreed to make up to 7 million Deutsche Marks available in compensation for Jewish former forced laborers who had worked for the company during the World War II.

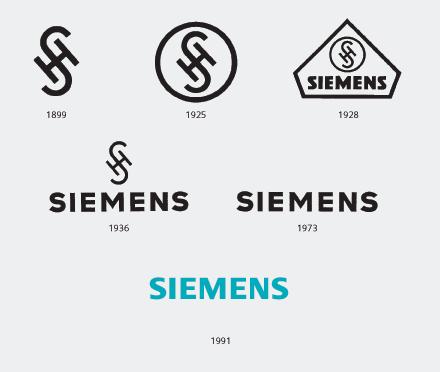
Historical Siemens logos

In 1977, Advanced Micro Devices (AMD) entered into a joint venture with Siemens, which wanted to enhance its technology expertise and enter the American market. Siemens purchased 20% of AMD's stock, giving the company an infusion of cash to increase its product lines. The two companies also jointly established Advanced Micro Computers (AMC), located in Silicon Valley and in Germany, allowing AMD to enter the microcomputer development and manufacturing field, in particular based on AMD's second-source Zilog Z8000 microprocessors. When the two companies' vision for Advanced Micro Computers diverged, AMD bought out Siemens's stake in the American division in 1979. AMD closed Advanced Micro Computers in late 1981 after switching focus to manufacturing second-source Intel x86 microprocessors.

In 1985, Siemens bought Allis-Chalmers' interest in the partnership company Siemens-Allis (formed 1978) which supplied electrical control equipment. It was incorporated into Siemens's Energy and Automation division.

In 1987, Siemens reintegrated Kraftwerk Union, the unit overseeing nuclear power business. In 1987, Siemens acquired Kongsberg Offshore from the Norwegian Government, selling it on to FMC Technologies in 1993. In 1989, Siemens bought the solar photovoltaic business, including 3 solar module manufacturing plants, from industry pioneer ARCO Solar, owned by oil firm ARCO.

In 1991, Siemens acquired Nixdorf Computer and renamed it Siemens Nixdorf Informationssysteme, in order to produce personal computers. In October 1991, Siemens acquired the Industrial Systems Division of Texas Instruments, based in Johnson City, Tennessee. This division was organized as Siemens Industrial Automation, and was later absorbed by Siemens Energy and Automation, Inc.

In 1992, Siemens bought out IBM's half of ROLM (Siemens had bought into ROLM five years earlier), thus creating SiemensROLM Communications; eventually dropping ROLM from the name later in the 1990s. In 1993–1994, Siemens C651 electric trains for Singapore's Mass Rapid Transit (MRT) system were built in Austria.

In 1997, Siemens agreed to sell the defence arm of Siemens Plessey to British Aerospace (BAe) and a German aerospace company, DaimlerChrysler Aerospace. BAe and DASA acquired the British and German divisions of the operation respectively. In October 1997, Siemens Financial Services (SFS) was founded to act as a competence center for financing issues and as a manager of financial risks within Siemens. In 1998, Siemens acquired Westinghouse Power Generation for more than $1.5 billion from the CBS Corporation and moving Siemens from third to second in the world power generation market. In 1999, Siemens's semiconductor operations were spun off into a new company called Infineon Technologies. Its Electromechanical Components operations were converted into a legally independent company: Siemens Electromechanical Components GmbH & Co. KG, (which, later that year, was sold to Tyco International Ltd for approximately $1.1 billion. In the same year, Siemens Nixdorf Informationssysteme AG became part of Fujitsu Siemens Computers, with its retail banking technology group becoming Wincor Nixdorf.

In 2000, Shared Medical Systems Corporation was acquired by the Siemens's Medical Engineering Group, eventually becoming part of Siemens Medical Solutions. Also in 2000, Atecs-Mannesman was acquired by Siemens, The sale was finalised in April 2001 with 50% of the shares acquired, acquisition, Mannesmann VDO AG merged into Siemens Automotive forming Siemens VDO Automotive AG, Atecs Mannesmann Dematic Systems merged into Siemens Production and Logistics forming Siemens Dematic AG, Mannesmann Demag Delaval merged into the Power Generation division of Siemens AG. Other parts of the company were acquired by Robert Bosch GmbH at the same time. Also, Moore Products Co. of Spring House, PA USA was acquired by Siemens Energy & Automation, Inc.

=== 2001 to 2005 ===
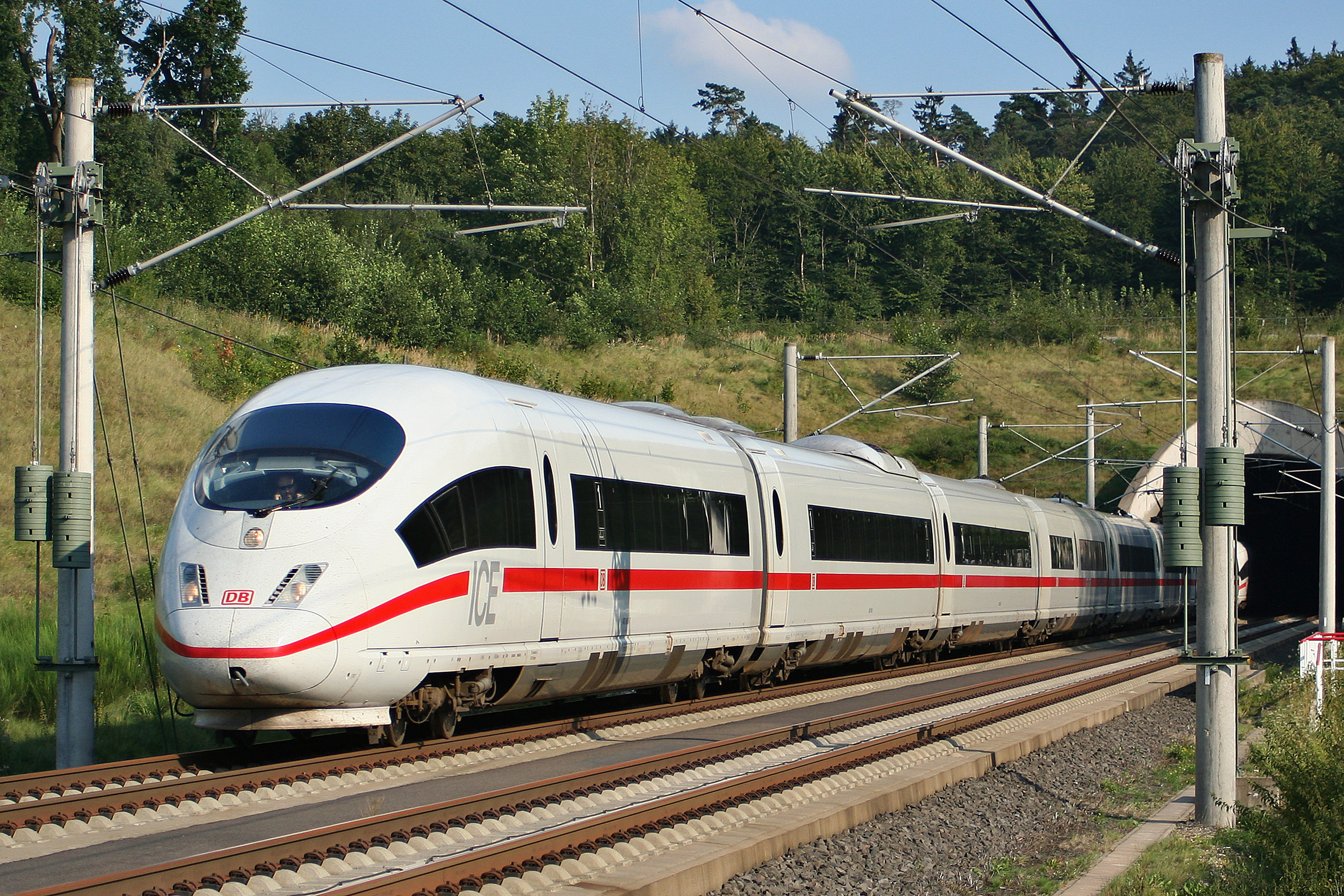
A Siemens Velaro high speed train in service on the Cologne–Frankfurt high-speed rail line

In 2001, Chemtech Group of Brazil was incorporated into the Siemens Group; it provides industrial process optimisation, consultancy and other engineering services. Also in 2001, Siemens formed joint venture Framatome with Areva SA of France by merging much of the companies' nuclear businesses. In 2002, Siemens sold some of its business activities to Kohlberg Kravis Roberts & Co. L.P. (KKR), with its metering business included in the sale package. In 2002, Siemens abandoned the solar photovoltaic industry by selling its participation in a joint-venture company, established in 2001 with Shell and E.ON, to Shell.

In 2003, Siemens acquired the flow division of Danfoss and incorporated it into the Automation and Drives division. Also in 2003 Siemens acquired IndX software (realtime data organisation and presentation). The same year in an unrelated development Siemens reopened its office in Kabul. Also in 2003 agreed to buy Alstom Industrial Turbines; a manufacturer of small, medium and industrial gas turbines for €1.1 billion. On 11 February 2003, Siemens planned to shorten phones' shelf life by bringing out annual Xelibri lines, with new devices launched as spring -summer and autumn-winter collections. On 6 March 2003, the company opened an office in San Jose. On 7 March 2003, the company announced that it planned to gain 10 per cent of the mainland China market for handsets. On 18 March 2003, the company unveiled the latest in its series of Xelibri fashion phones.

In 2004, the wind energy company Bonus Energy in Brande, Denmark was acquired, forming Siemens Wind Power division. Also in 2004, Siemens invested in Dasan Networks (South Korea, broadband network equipment) acquiring ~40% of the shares, Nokia Siemens disinvested itself of the shares in 2008. The same year Siemens acquired Photo-Scan (UK, CCTV systems), US Filter Corporation (water and Waste Water Treatment Technologies/ Solutions, acquired from Veolia), Huntsville Electronics Corporation (automobile electronics, acquired from Chrysler), and Chantry Networks (WLAN equipment).

In 2005, Siemens sold the Siemens mobile manufacturing business to BenQ, forming the BenQ-Siemens division. Also in 2005 Siemens acquired Flender Holding GmbH (Bocholt, Germany, gears/industrial drives), Bewator AB (building security systems), Wheelabrator Air Pollution Control, Inc. (Industrial and power station dust control systems), AN Windenergie GmbH. (Wind energy), Power Technologies Inc. (Schenectady, USA, energy industry software and training), CTI Molecular Imaging (Positron emission tomography and molecular imaging systems), Myrio (IPTV systems), Shaw Power Technologies International Ltd (UK/USA, electrical engineering consulting, acquired from Shaw Group), and Transmitton (Ashby de la Zouch UK, rail and other industry control and asset management).

=== 2005 and continuing: worldwide bribery scandal ===
Beginning in 2005, Siemens became embroiled in a multi-national bribery scandal. Among the various incidents was the Siemens Greek bribery scandal, where the company was accused of deals with Greek government officials during the 2004 Summer Olympics. This case, along with others, triggered legal investigations in Germany, initiated by prosecutors in Italy, Liechtenstein, and Switzerland, and later followed by an American investigation in 2006 due to the company's activities while listed on US stock exchanges.

Investigations found that Siemens had a pattern of bribing officials to secure contracts, with the company spending approximately $1.3 billion on bribes across several countries, and maintaining separate accounting records to conceal this. Following the investigations, Siemens settled in December 2008, paying a combined total of approximately $1.6 billion to the US and Germany in what was, at the time, the largest bribery fine in history. In addition, the company was required to invest $1 billion in developing and maintaining new internal compliance procedures. Siemens admitted to violating the accounting provisions of the Foreign Corrupt Practices Act, while its Bangladesh and Venezuela subsidiaries pleaded guilty to paying bribes.

Despite initial expectations of a fine as high as $5 billion, the final amount was significantly less, in part due to Siemens's cooperation with the investigators, the upcoming change in the US administration, and Siemens's role as a US military contractor. The payments included $450 million in fines and penalties and a forfeiture of $350 million in profits in the US. Siemens also revamped its compliance systems, appointing Peter Y. Solmssen, a US lawyer, as an independent director in charge of compliance and accepting oversight from Theo Waigel, a former German finance minister. Siemens implemented new anti-corruption policies, including a comprehensive anti-corruption handbook, online tools for due diligence and compliance, a confidential communications channel for employees, and a corporate disciplinary committee. This process involved hiring approximately 500 full-time compliance personnel worldwide.

Siemens's bribery culture was not new; it was highlighted as far back as 1914 when both Siemens and Vickers were involved in a scandal over bribes paid to Japanese naval authorities. The company resorted to bribery as it sought to expand its business in the developing world after World War II. Up until 1999, bribes were a tax-deductible business expense in Germany, with no penalties for bribing foreign officials. However, with the implementation of the 1999 OECD Anti-Bribery Convention, Siemens started using off-shore accounts to hide its bribery.

During the investigation, key player Reinhard Siekaczek, a mid-level executive in the telecommunications unit, provided critical evidence. He disclosed that he had managed an annual global bribery budget of $40 to $50 million and provided information about the company's 2,700 worldwide contractors, who were typically used to channel money to government officials. Notable instances of bribery included substantial payments in Argentina, Israel, Venezuela, China, Nigeria, and Russia to secure large contracts.

The investigation resulted in multiple prosecutions and settlements with various governments, as well as legal action against Siemens employees and those who received bribes. Noteworthy cases include the conviction of two former executives in 2007 for bribing Italian energy company Enel, a settlement with the Greek government in 2012 for 330 million euros over the Greek bribery scandal, and a guilty plea in 2014 from former Siemens executive Andres Truppel for channeling nearly $100 million in bribes to Argentine government officials. Siemens also faced repercussions from the World Bank due to fraudulent practices by its Russian affiliate. In 2009, Siemens agreed not to bid on World Bank projects for two years and to establish a $100 million fund at the World Bank to support anti-corruption activities over 15 years, known as the "Siemens Integrity Initiative". Other substantial fines include a payment of ₦7 billion (US$46.57 million) to the Nigerian government in 2010, and a US$42.7 million penalty in Israel in 2014 to avoid charges of securities fraud.

=== 2006 to 2011 ===
In 2006, Siemens purchased Bayer Diagnostics which was incorporated into the Medical Solutions Diagnostics division on 1 January 2007, also in 2006 Siemens acquired Controlotron (New York) (ultrasonic flow meters), and also in 2006 Siemens acquired Diagnostic Products Corp., Kadon Electro Mechanical Services Ltd. (now TurboCare Canada Ltd.), Kühnle, Kopp, & Kausch AG, Opto Control, and VistaScape Security Systems.

In January 2007, Siemens was fined €396 million by the European Commission for price fixing in EU electricity markets through a cartel involving 11 companies, including ABB, Alstom, Fuji Electric, Hitachi, AE Power Systems, Mitsubishi Electric, Schneider, Areva, Toshiba and VA Tech. According to the commission, "between 1988 and 2004, the companies rigged bids for procurement contracts, fixed prices, allocated projects to each other, shared markets and exchanged commercially important and confidential information." Siemens was given the highest fine of €396 million, more than half of the total, for its alleged leadership role in the activity.

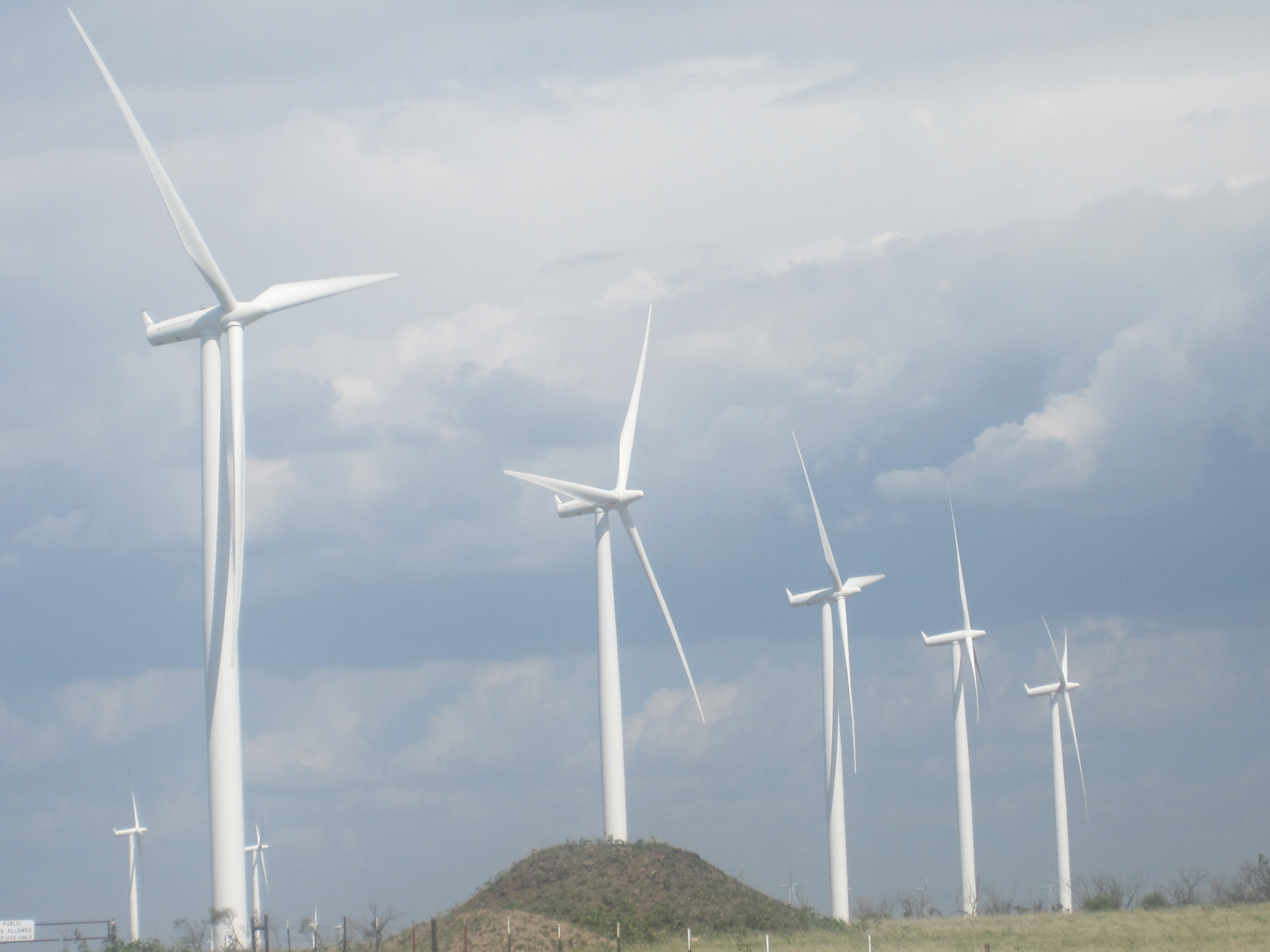
Siemens power generating wind turbine towers

In March 2007, a Siemens board member was temporarily arrested and accused of illegally financing AUB, a business-friendly labour association which competes against the trade union IG Metall. He was released on bail. Offices of AUB and Siemens were searched. Siemens denied any wrongdoing.

In April the Fixed Networks, Mobile Networks and Carrier Services divisions of Siemens merged with Nokia's Network Business Group in a 50/50 joint venture, creating a fixed and mobile network company called Nokia Siemens Networks. Nokia delayed the merger due to bribery investigations against Siemens. In October 2007, a court in Munich found that the company had bribed public officials in Libya, Russia, and Nigeria in return for the awarding of contracts; four former Nigerian Ministers of Communications were among those named as recipients of the payments. The company admitted to having paid the bribes and agreed to pay a fine of 201 million euros. In December 2007, the Nigerian government cancelled a contract with Siemens due to the bribery findings.

Also in 2007, Siemens acquired Vai Ingdesi Automation (Argentina, Industrial Automation), UGS Corp., Dade Behring, Sidelco (Quebec, Canada), S/D Engineers Inc., and Gesellschaft für Systemforschung und Dienstleistungen im Gesundheitswesen mbH (GSD) (Germany). In July 2008, Siemens AG formed a joint venture of the Enterprise Communications business with the Gores Group, renamed Unify in 2013. The Gores Group holding a majority interest of 51% stake, with Siemens AG holding a minority interest of 49%. In August 2008, Siemens Project Ventures invested $15 million in the Arava Power Company. In a press release published that month, Peter Löscher, president and CEO of Siemens AG said: "This investment is another consequential step in further strengthening our green and sustainable technologies". Siemens now holds a 40% stake in the company.

In January 2009, Siemens sold its 34% stake in Framatome, complaining limited managerial influence. In March, it formed an alliance with Rosatom of Russia to engage in nuclear-power activities. In April 2009, Fujitsu Siemens Computers became Fujitsu Technology Solutions as a result of Fujitsu buying out Siemens's share of the company. In June 2009 news broke that Nokia Siemens had supplied telecommunications equipment to the Iranian telecom company that included the ability to intercept and monitor telecommunications, a facility known as "lawful intercept". The equipment was believed to have been used in the suppression of the 2009 Iranian election protests, leading to criticism of the company, including by the European Parliament. Nokia Siemens later divested its call monitoring business, and reduced its activities in Iran. In October 2009, Siemens signed a $418 million contract to buy Solel Solar Systems, an Israeli company in the solar thermal power business.

In December 2010, Siemens agreed to sell its IT Solutions and Services subsidiary for €850 million to Atos. As part of the deal, Siemens agreed to take a 15% stake in the enlarged Atos, to be held for a minimum of five years. In addition, Siemens concluded a seven-year outsourcing contract worth around €5.5 billion, under which Atos will provide managed services and systems integration to Siemens. At the same time, Germany's Wegmann Group acquired Siemens's 49-percent stake in armored vehicle manufacturer Krauss-Maffei Wegmann GmbH, establishing Wegmann as the sole shareholder of KMW, pending approval by government authorities.

=== 2011 to present ===
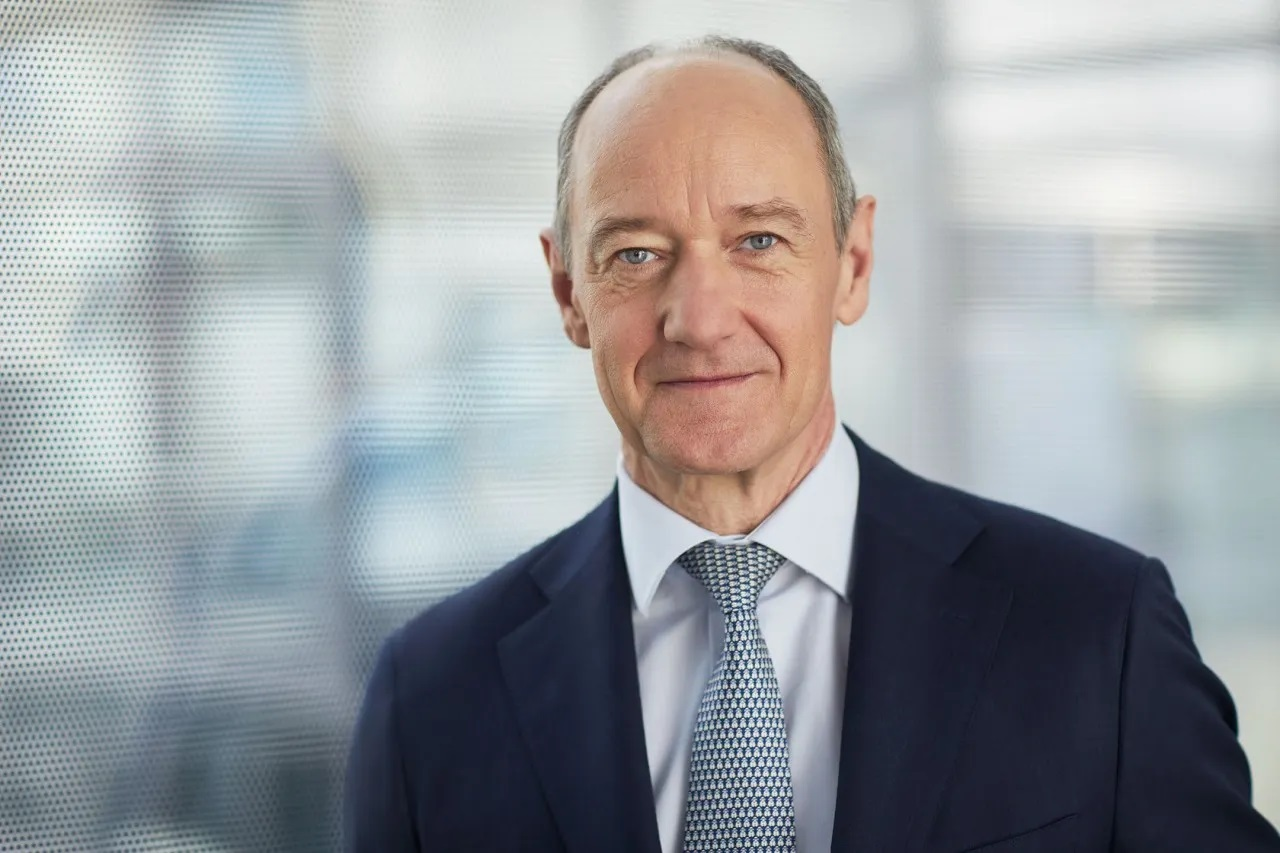
Roland Busch has served as the company's CEO since 2021

In March 2011, it was decided to list Osram on the stock market in the autumn, but CEO Peter Löscher said Siemens intended to retain a long-term interest in the company, which was already independent from the technological and managerial viewpoints.

In September 2011, Siemens, which had been responsible for constructing all 17 of Germany's existing nuclear power plants, announced that it would exit the nuclear sector following the Fukushima disaster and the subsequent changes to German energy policy. Chief executive Peter Löscher has supported the German government's planned Energiewende, its transition to renewable energy technologies, calling it a "project of the century" and saying Berlin's target of reaching 35% renewable energy sources by 2020 was feasible.

In November 2012, Siemens acquired the Rail division of Invensys for £1.7 billion. In the same month, Siemens acquired a privately held company, LMS International NV. In August 2013, Nokia acquired 100% of the company Nokia Siemens Networks, with a buy-out of Siemens AG, ending Siemens role in telecommunication. In August 2013, Siemens won a $966.8 million order for power plant components from oil firm Saudi Aramco, the largest bid it has ever received from the Saudi company.

In 2014, Siemens announced plans to build a $264 million facility for making offshore wind turbines in Paull, England, as Britain's wind power rapidly expands. Siemens chose the Hull area on the east coast of England because it is close to other large offshore projects planned in coming years. The new plant is expected to begin producing turbine rotor blades in 2016. The plant and the associated service center, in Green Port Hull nearby, will employ about 1,000 workers. The facilities will serve the UK market, where the electricity that major power producers generate from wind grew by about 38 percent in 2013, representing about 6 percent of total electricity, according to government figures. There are also plans to increase Britain's wind-generating capacity at least threefold by 2020, to 14 gigawatts.

In May 2014, Rolls-Royce agreed to sell its gas turbine and compressor energy business to Siemens for £1 billion. In June 2014, Siemens and Mitsubishi Heavy Industries announced their formation of joint ventures to bid for Alstom's troubled energy and transportation businesses (in locomotives, steam turbines, and aircraft engines). A rival bid by General Electric (GE) has been criticized by French government sources, who consider Alstom's operations as a "vital national interest" at a moment when the French unemployment level stands above 10% and some voters are turning towards the far-right.

In 2015, Siemens acquired U.S. oilfield equipment maker Dresser-Rand Group Inc for $7.6 billion. In November 2016, Siemens acquired EDA company Mentor Graphics for $4.5 billion. In November 2017, the U.S. Department of Justice charged three Chinese employees of Guangzhou Bo Yu Information Technology Company Limited with hacking into corporate entities, including Siemens AG. In December 2017, Siemens acquired the medical technology company Fast Track Diagnostics for an undisclosed amount.

In August 2018, Siemens acquired rapid application development company Mendix for €0.6 billion in cash. In May 2018, Siemens acquired J2 Innovations for an undisclosed amount. In May 2018, Siemens acquired Enlighted, Inc. for an undisclosed amount. In September 2019, Siemens and Orascom Construction signed an agreement with the Iraqi government to rebuild two power plants, which is believed to set up the company for future deals in the country. In December 2019, Siemens acquired Pixeom, Inc. for an undisclosed amount. In 2019–2020, Siemens was identified as a key engineering company supporting the controversial Adani Carmichael coal mine in Queensland (Australia).

In January 2020, Siemens signed an agreement to acquire 99% equity share capital of Indian switchgear manufacturer C&S Electric at €267 million (₹2,100 crore). The takeover was approved by the Competition Commission of India in August 2020. In April 2020, Siemens acquired a 77% majority stake in Indian building service provider iMetrex Technologies for an undisclosed sum. In April 2020, Siemens Energy was created as an independent company out of the energy division of Siemens. In August 2020, Siemens Healthineers AG announced that it plans to acquire U.S. cancer device and software company Varian Medical Systems in an all-stock deal valued at $16.4 billion. In February 2021, Roland Busch replaced Joe Kaeser as CEO. In October 2021, Siemens acquired the building IoT software and hardware company Wattsense for an undisclosed sum.

In May 2022, Siemens made the decision to cease its operations in Russia after 170 years and disassociate itself from any involvement with the Russian government due to the ongoing war of aggression against Ukraine. This decision affected the approximately 3,000 employees working for the company in the country. The announcement came with a financial statement in which Siemens disclosed a second-quarter loss of approximately US$625 million as a direct consequence of the imposed sanctions on Russia. In July 2022, Siemens acquired ZONA Technology, an aerospace simulation firm. In October 2022, Siemens announced a strategic partnership with Swedish electric commercial vehicle manufacturer Volta Trucks to deliver and scale eMobility charging infrastructure to simplify the transition to fleet electrification. In October 2022, Siemens became a target of the Boycott, Divestment and Sanctions movement due to its award of a contract for the EuroAsia Interconnector, which is planned to connect the electricity grids of Greece and Cyprus with both Israel and its illegal settlements in the West Bank.

In June 2023, Siemens announced a global investment plan of €2 billion to expand its manufacturing capacity, including specific commitments of €200 million for a new high-tech plant in Singapore and €140 million to enlarge a facility in Chengdu, China. Simultaneously, Siemens will allocate €1 billion for the development of new facilities and factories in Germany, including €500 million for the expansion and modernization of a factory in Erlangen, expected to increase production capacity by 60% by 2029. This coincides with the German government's concerns about the economic and security risks associated with investing in China. Additional German investments will finance a new semiconductor factory in Forchheim and a training center for Siemens Healthineers in Erlangen. In August 2023, it was announced Siemens had signed an agreement to acquire the Veldhoven-headquartered eBus, eTruck and passenger vehicle fast charging technology company, Heliox.

In March 2024, Siemens announced the creation of a new £100m digital engineering facility in Wiltshire, UK, aimed at replacing its existing rail infrastructure factory in Chippenham with a new research and development centre, expected to open by 2026. The move is endorsed by Chancellor Jeremy Hunt as "a big boost" for UK manufacturing. In March 2024, it was announced Siemens had agreed to acquire ebm-papst's industrial drive technology (IDT) division for undisclosed amount. Since Roland Busch became chief executive, Siemens expanded its collaborations in digital technologies. The company entered into partnerships with NVIDIA, Microsoft, and Amazon Web Services (AWS) to integrate generative artificial intelligence and cloud computing into its software and automation portfolio.

On March 26, 2025, Siemens finalized its acquisition of Altair Engineering for approximately US$10 billion, its largest transaction to date. The acquisition integrated Altair's simulation software into the Siemens Xcelerator platform. Subsequently, the company began developing an Industrial Foundation Model, an AI system trained on technical data, including 3D models and engineering drawings, to automate manufacturing workflows and integrate virtual design with physical production systems. In July 2025, Siemens completed the acquisition of Dotmatics, a provider of Life Sciences R&D software, for $5.1 billion, expanding presence in the Life Sciences sector. In October 2025, Siemens announced a collaboration with rhobot.ai to commercially launch an edge-native artificial-intelligence solution for manufacturing, available via the Siemens Xcelerator digital marketplace. The solution, deployed without downtime at CarbonAMS's anaerobic-digester facility in Ireland, achieved a 39% reduction in parasitic load and a 2.5% increase in gas output.

In January 2026, it was announced that Siemens had acquired ASTER Technologies, a French provider of printed circuit board assembly test verification and engineering software. The acquisition was intended to strengthen Siemens' design-for-test capabilities and enhance its electronics design and manufacturing software offerings.

== Operations ==
Sales by business (2023)
Business	share
Siemens Healthineers	27.7%
Digital Industries	27.6%
Smart Infrastructure	25.2%
Mobility	13.5%
Portfolio Companies	4.0%
Reconciliation	1.4%
Siemens Financial Services	0.6%

As of 2023, the principal divisions of Siemens are Digital Industries, Smart Infrastructure, Siemens Mobility, Siemens Healthineers and Siemens Financial Services, with Siemens Healthineers and Siemens Mobility operating as independent entities. Siemens also operates a number of "Portfolio Companies" with market-specific offerings. In 2020, the energy business was spun off into the separate Siemens Energy AG, with Siemens retaining a stake of 17.1% as of December 2023. Other business units of the company include Siemens Technology (T) for research and development, Siemens Real Estate (SRE) for corporate real estate management, Siemens Advanta for consulting services (including the management consulting division Siemens Advanta Consulting), next47 as a venture capital fund, and Siemens Global Business Services (GBS) as a shared services unit.

=== Digital Industries ===
The Digital Industries division focuses on the automation needs of discrete and process industries. This includes factory automation infrastructure, numerical control systems, engines, drives, inverters, integrated automation systems for machine tools and production machines, and machine to machine communication products. The division also develops industrial control systems, various types of sensors, and radio-frequency identification systems. In industrial automation and industrial software, Siemens is the global market leader.

In addition to hardware, Digital Industries supplies software for product lifecycle management (PLM), simulation and testing of mechatronic systems, and the MindSphere cloud-based IoT operating system that connects physical infrastructure to the digital world. The software portfolio is supplemented by the Mendix platform for low-code application development and digital marketplaces like Supplyframe and Pixeom. Key customer markets span automotive, machine building, pharmaceuticals, chemicals, food and beverage, electronics, and semiconductors.

In 2023, CEO Roland Busch announced the aim to raise software businesses sales share to 20% in the long term. In June 2023, Siemens launched a new open digital platform called "Siemens Xcelerator", which houses a curated portfolio of IoT-enabled hardware, software, and digital services from both Siemens and third parties. Siemens also announced a partnership with Nvidia, aiming to leverage its Omniverse platform with its 3D design capabilities. Xcelerator is part of a broader industry trend towards digital environments ("metaverses"), and is delivered through a software as a service (SaaS) subscription model, targeting accessibility for a range of businesses including small and medium-sized enterprises.

In October 2023, Siemens and Microsoft launched the Siemens Industrial Copilot, a generative AI assistant integrated into Siemens' industrial software. The system uses Microsoft's Azure OpenAI Service and large language models for applications in automation, simulation, and system configuration.

In March 2025, Siemens acquired Altair Engineering for $10 billion. Following the acquisition, Altair was integrated into Siemens' Digital Industries division, with its simulation technologies incorporated into the Xcelerator digital twin platform.

=== Smart Infrastructure ===
Siemens Smart Infrastructure offerings are categorized into buildings, electrification, and electrical products. Its buildings portfolio includes building automation systems, heating, ventilation, and air conditioning (HVAC) controls, and fire safety and security systems, and energy performance services. The electrification portfolio is dedicated to grid resilience and efficiency, encompassing grid simulation, operation control software, power-system automation and protection, and medium to low voltage switchgear. Moreover, it includes charging infrastructure for electric vehicles. In the realm of electrical products, the division offers low-voltage switching, measuring and control equipment, distribution systems, and medium voltage switchgear.

In the renewable energy industry, the company provides a portfolio of products and services to help build and operate microgrids of any size. It provides generation and distribution of electrical energy as well as monitoring and controlling of microgrids. By using primarily renewable energy, microgrids reduce carbon-dioxide emissions, which is often required by government regulations. It supplied a sustainable storage product and microgrids to Enel Produzione SPA for the island of Ventotene in Italy.

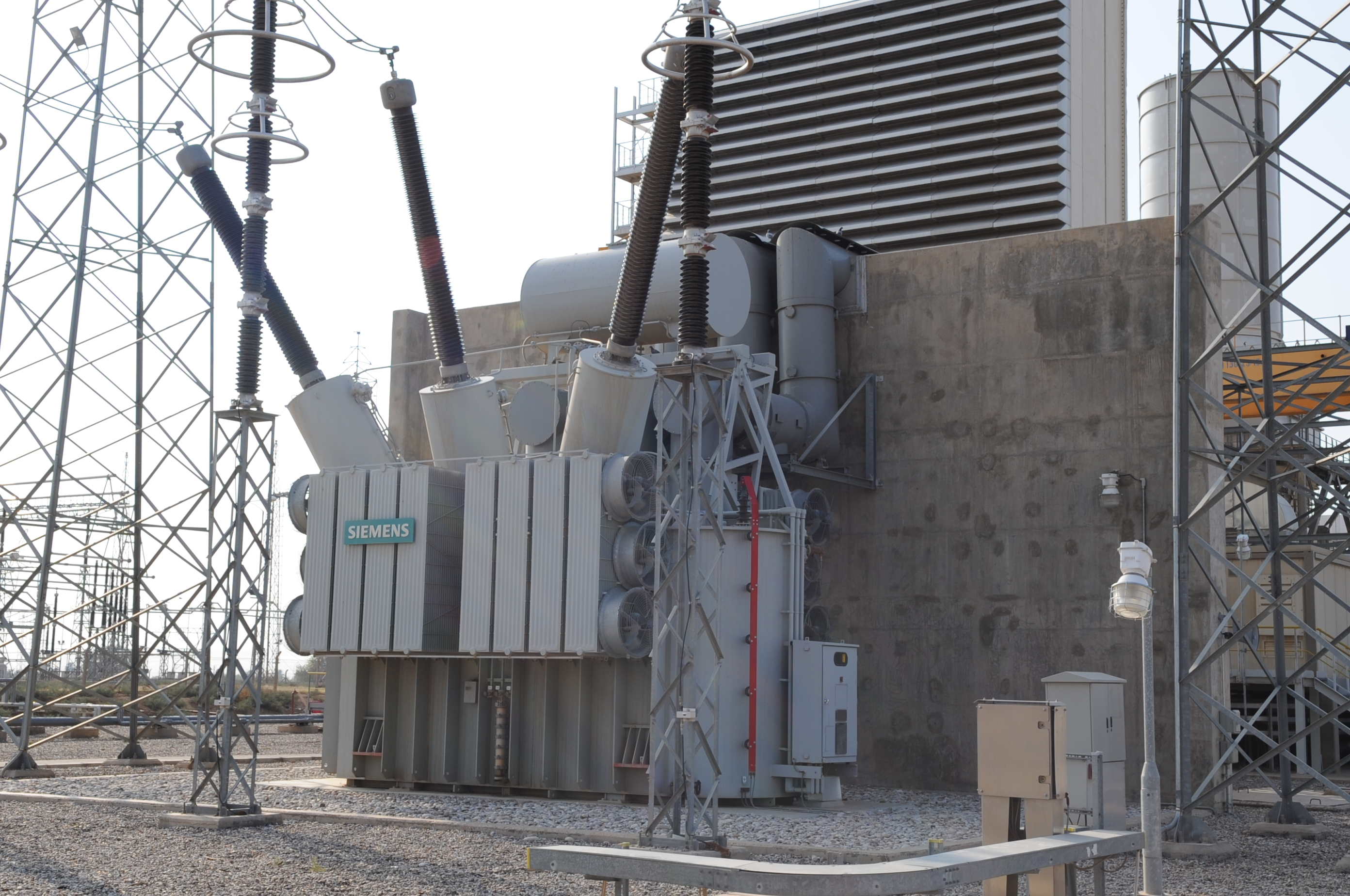
A Siemens high-voltage transformer

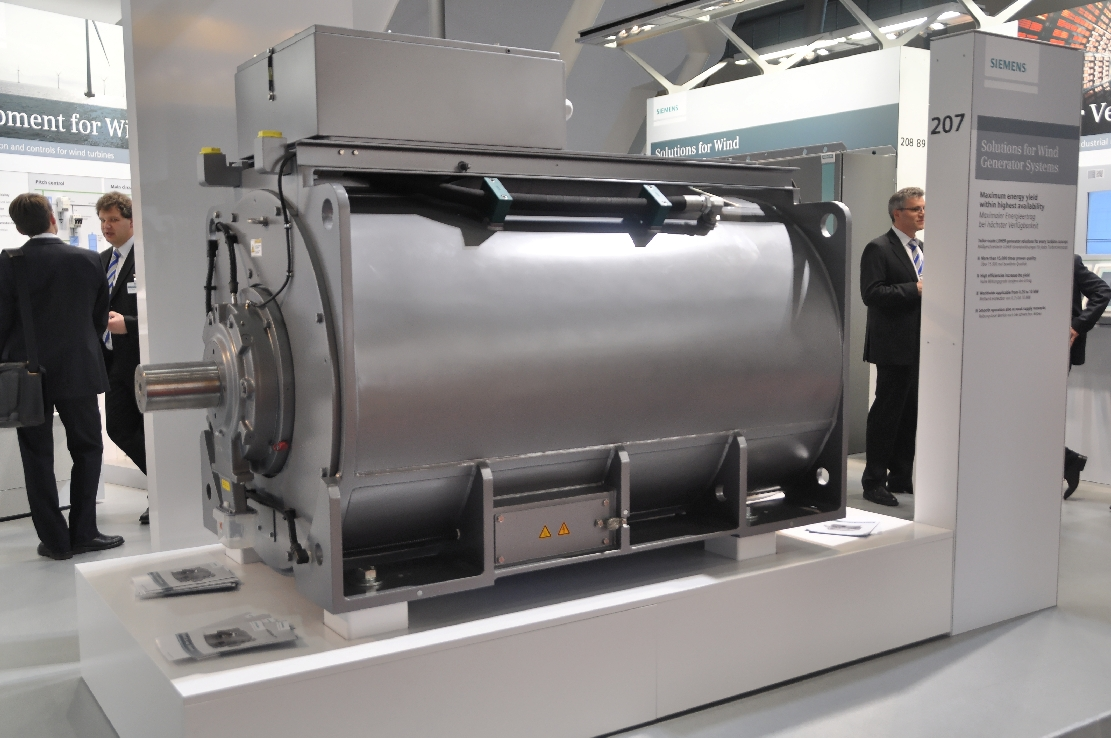
A Siemens wind power generator

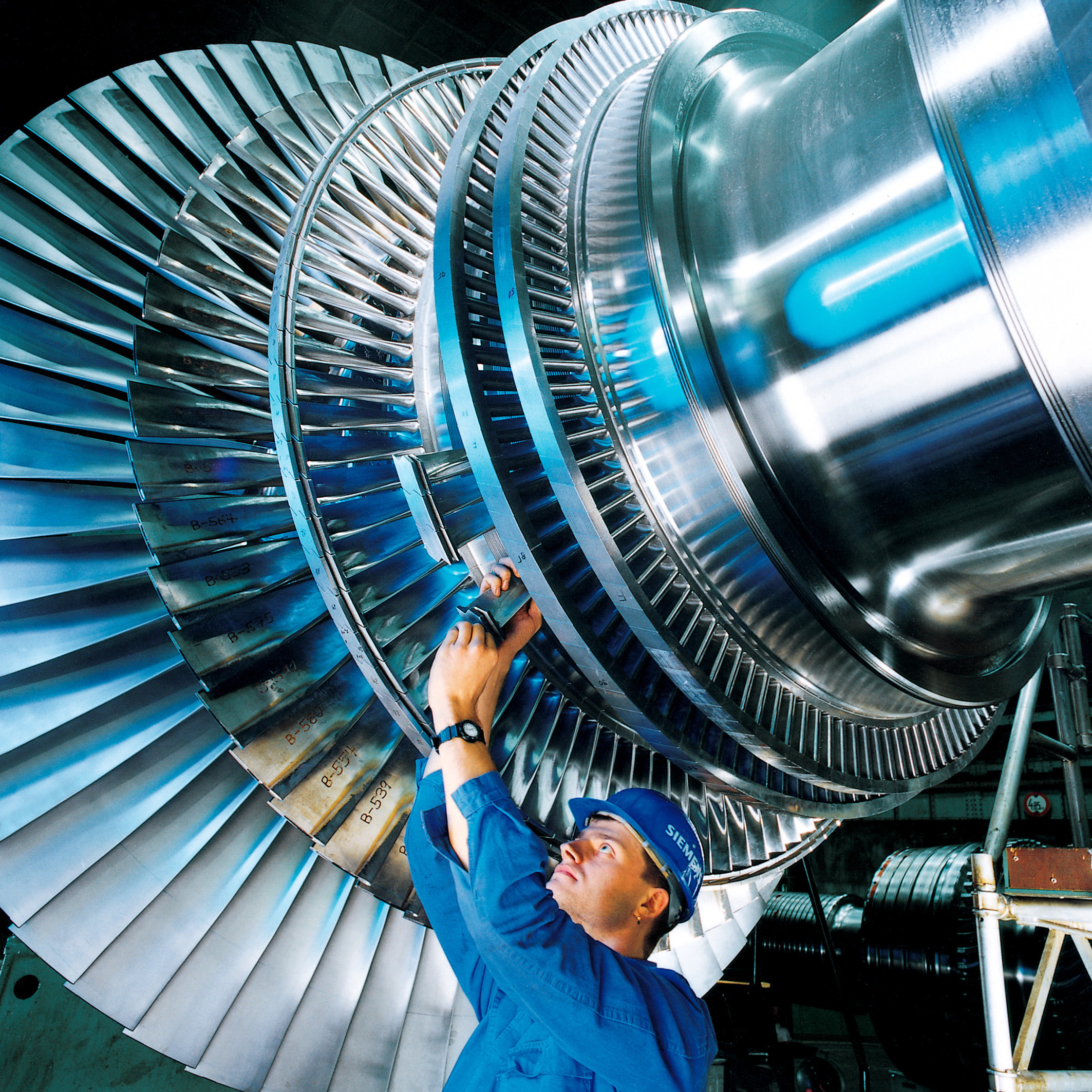
A Siemens steam turbine rotor

=== Siemens Mobility ===
Siemens Mobility is a division involved in rail transportation. This includes providing rolling stock, which covers a range of vehicles for urban, regional, and long-distance travel. The division also offers rail infrastructure products and services such as rail automation, digital station services, railway communication systems, and yard and depot services.

In 2019, the European Commission blocked a merger between Alstom and Siemens Mobility, citing anti-trust regulations. The plan would have seen the creation of a "European champion" to compete with China's CRRC.

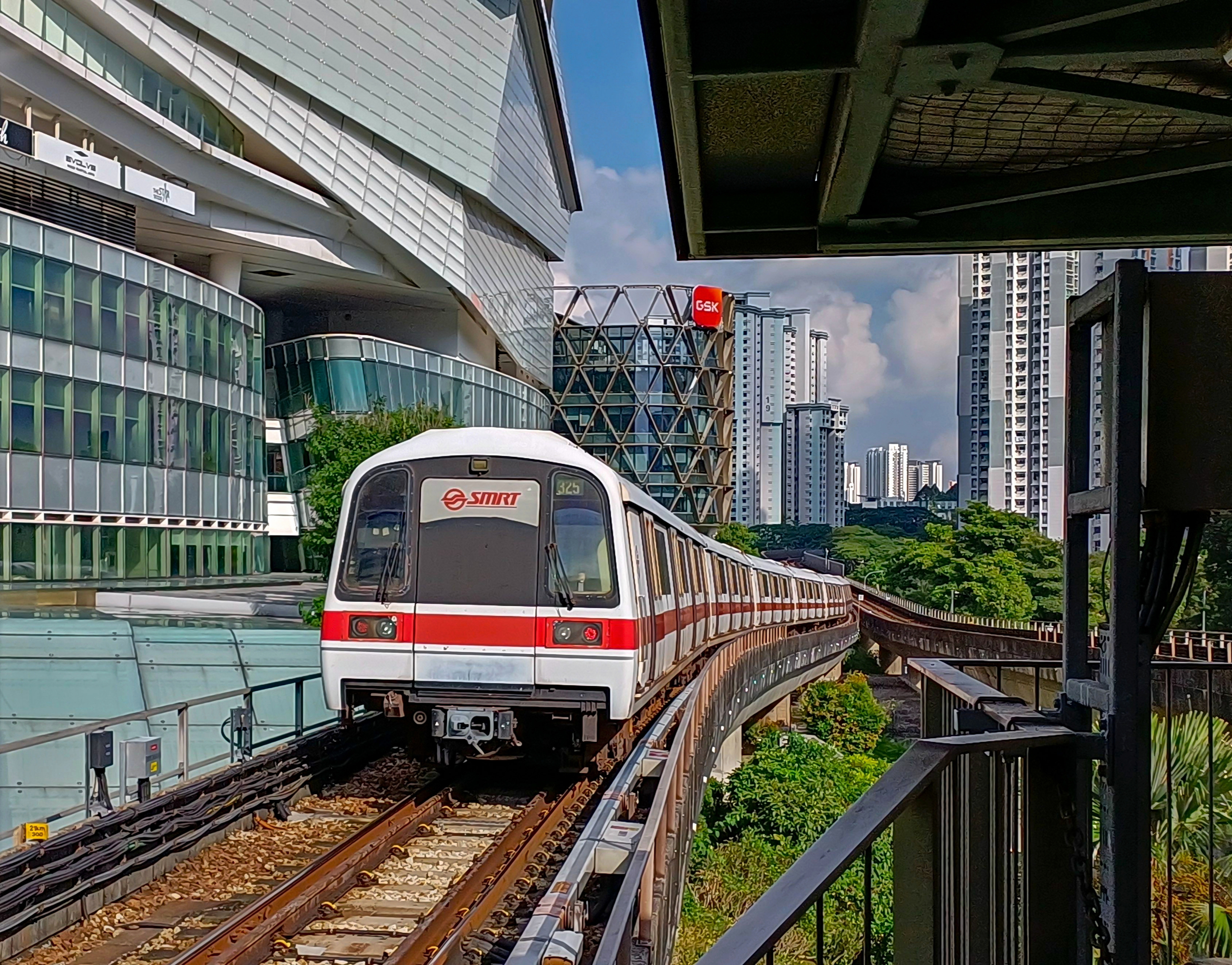
Siemens C651 trains operate by Singapore MRT

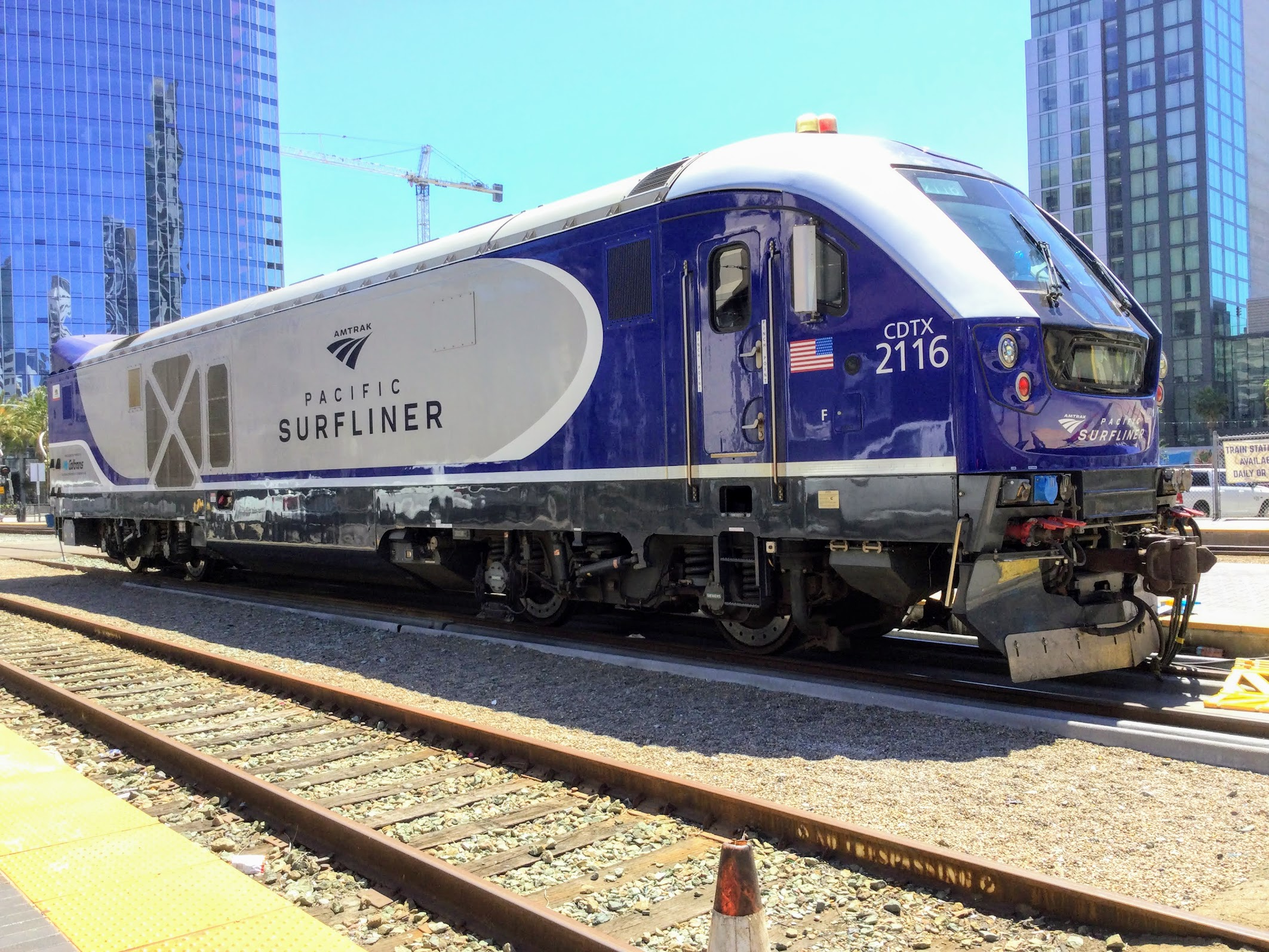
Amtrak Siemens SC-44 Charger diesel-electric passenger locomotive parked in Santa Fe Depot, San Diego

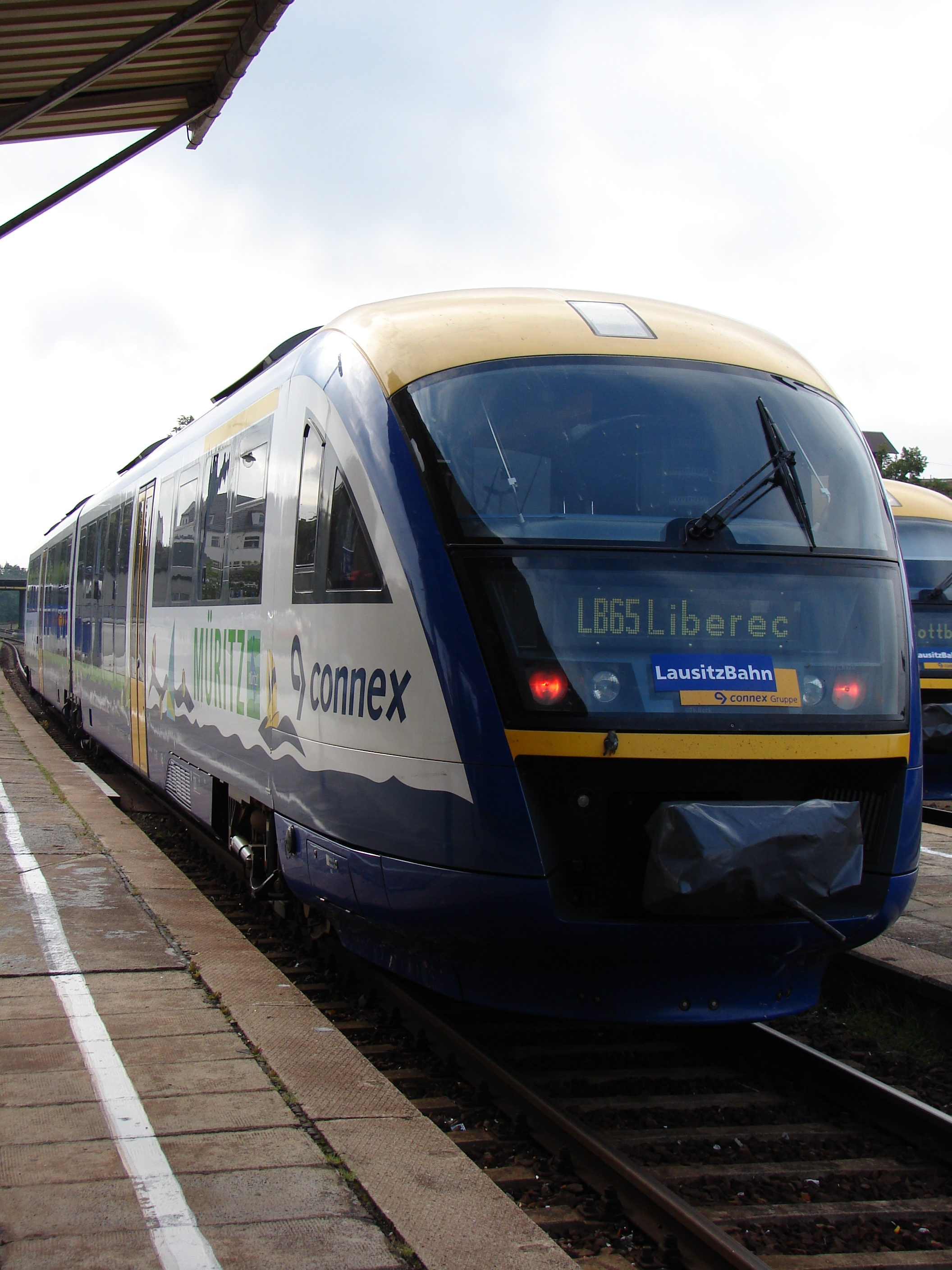
A Siemens Desiro train in operation

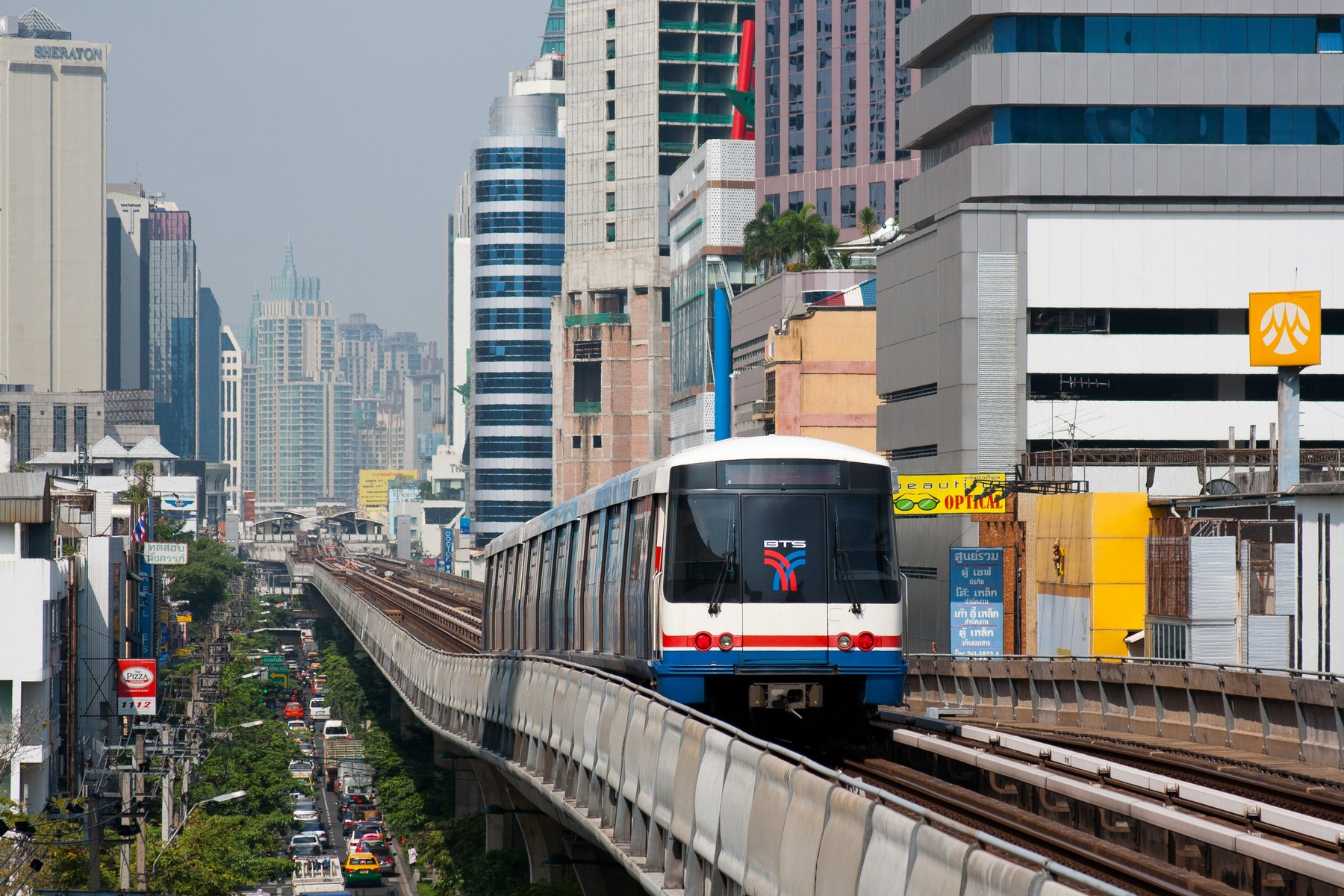
Bangkok Skytrain built by Siemens

=== Siemens Healthineers ===
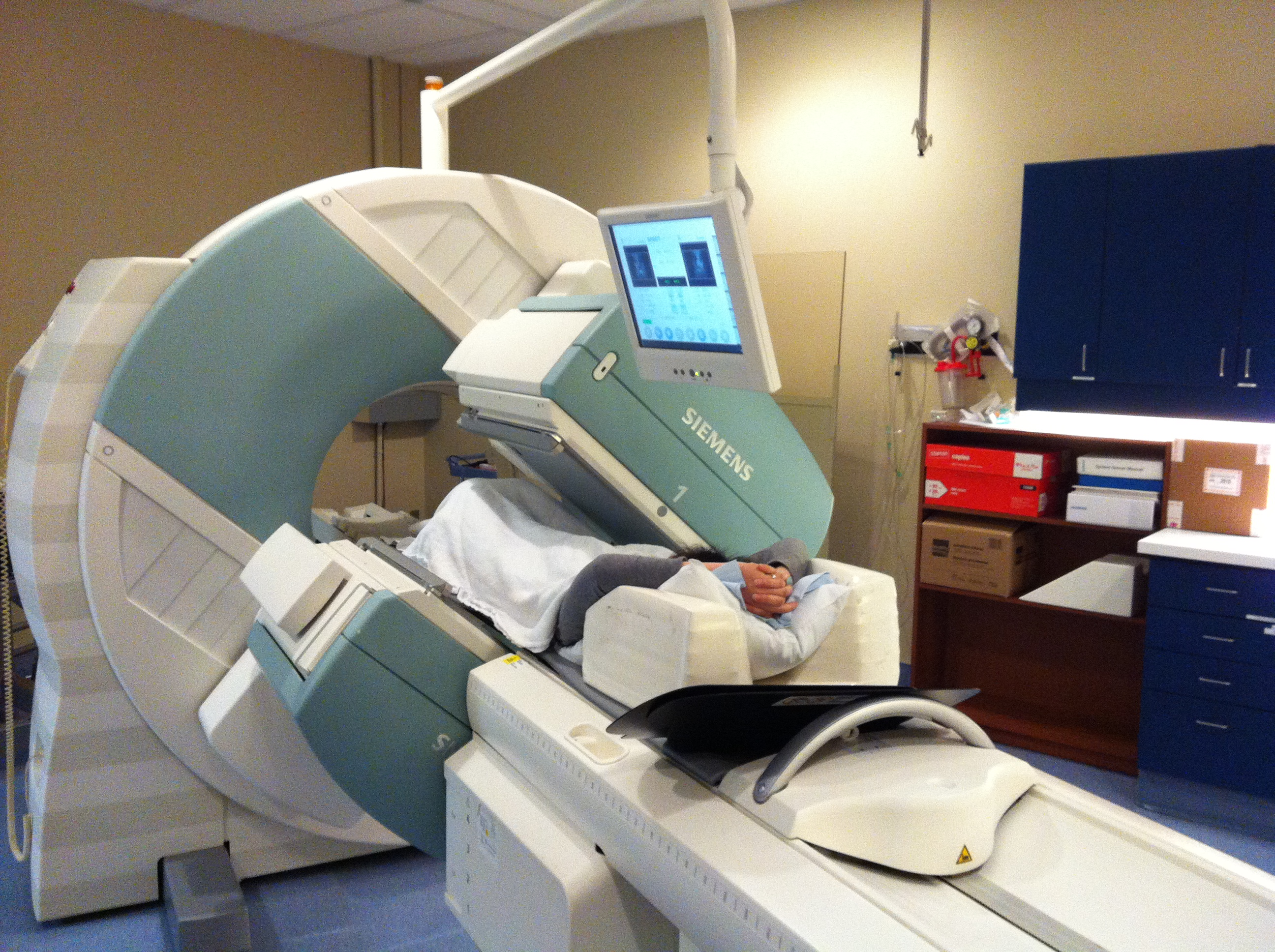
A Siemens SPECT/CT scanner in operation

Siemens Healthineers AG is a publicly listed company that was spun off from Siemens in 2017. As of 2022, Siemens retains a 75% majority stake in Siemens Healthineers.

As a global provider of healthcare services, its range of offerings includes the manufacture and sale of diagnostic and therapeutic products, clinical consulting, and a variety of training services. Its operations are divided into four main sectors: imaging, diagnostics, Varian Medical Systems, and advanced therapies. Imaging includes magnetic resonance, computed tomography, X-ray, molecular imaging, and ultrasound devices. The diagnostics segment offers in-vitro diagnostic products for laboratory and point-of-care settings. Varian, an American company acquired by Siemens Healthineers in 2021, covers technologies related to cancer care, and advanced therapies focus on image-guided minimally invasive procedures.

=== Siemens Financial Services ===
Siemens Financial Services (SFS) is a division that delivers a range of financing services. These services target both Siemens's customers and external companies, including debt and equity investments. It provides leasing, lending, working capital, structured financing, and equipment and project financing services. SFS is also involved in providing financial advisory services and risk management expertise to Siemens's industrial businesses, helping assess risk profiles of projects and business models.

=== Former operations ===
Siemens is known for actively refining its core business through strategic divestitures, pursuing a strategy referred to as "Corporate Clarity" that focuses on selling non-core aspects of the business. Major business divisions that were once part of Siemens before being spun off include:

- Deutsche Grammophon/Polydor Records (1987)
- Infineon Technologies (1999)
- Siemens Mobile (2005)
- Gigaset Communications (2008)
- Osram (2013)
- Siemens Energy (2020)

=== Joint ventures ===
Siemens's current joint ventures include:

- Siemens Traction Equipment Ltd. (STEZ), Zhuzhou China, is a joint venture between Siemens, Zhuzhou CSR Times Electric Co., Ltd. (TEC) and CSR Zhuzhou Electric Locomotive Co., Ltd. (ZELC), which produces AC drive electric locomotives and AC locomotive traction components.
- OMNETRIC Group, A Siemens & Accenture company formed in 2014.

Former joint ventures in which Siemens no longer holds any equity include:

- Fujitsu Siemens Computers (sold to Fujitsu in 2009)
- Nokia Siemens Networks (sold to Nokia in 2013)
- BSH Hausgeräte (sold to Bosch in 2014)
- Primetals Technologies (sold to Mitsubishi Heavy Industries in 2019).
- Silcar was a joint venture between Siemens Ltd and Thiess Services Pty Ltd until 2013. Silcar is a 3,000 person Australian organisation providing productivity and reliability for large scale and technically complex plant assets. Services include asset management, design, construction, operations and maintenance. Silcar operates across a range of industries and essential services including power generation, electrical distribution, manufacturing, mining and telecommunications. In July 2013, Thiess took full control.

== Corporate affairs ==
Siemens is incorporated in Germany and has its corporate headquarters at the Wittelsbacherplatz in central Munich.

=== Business trends ===
Sales by region (2023)
Region	share
Europe, CIS, Africa, Middle East (without Germany)	29.7%
United States	24.5%
Asia, Australia	22.1%
Germany	19.0%
Americas (without U.S.)	4.6%

For the fiscal year 2023, Siemens reported a revenue of €77.7 billion, an increase of 8% over the previous fiscal cycle. In December 2023, Siemens's shares traded at over US$93 per share, and its market capitalization was US$147 billion. According to an Ernst & Young study published in December 2023, Siemens and SAP were the only German companies of the top 100 most valuable companies by market capitalization worldwide.

The key trends of Siemens are (as at the financial year ending September 30):

Year	Revenue in €billion	Net income in €billion	Total assets in €billion	Employees
2013	75.8	4.2	101	362,000
2014	71.9	5.3	104	357,000
2015	75.6	7.2	120	348,000
2016	79.6	5.4	125	351,000
2017	83.0	6.0	133	372,000
2018	83.0	5.8	138	379,000
2019	86.8	5.1	150	385,000
2020*	57.1	4.0	123	293,000
2021	62.2	6.1	139	295,000
2022	71.9	3.7	151	311,000
2023	77.7	7.9	145	320,000
2024	75.9	9.0	148	327,000
2025	78.9	9.6	166	318,000

* In 2020, Siemens Energy became an independent company.

=== Locations ===
As of 2011, Siemens has operations in around 190 countries and approximately 285 production and manufacturing facilities.

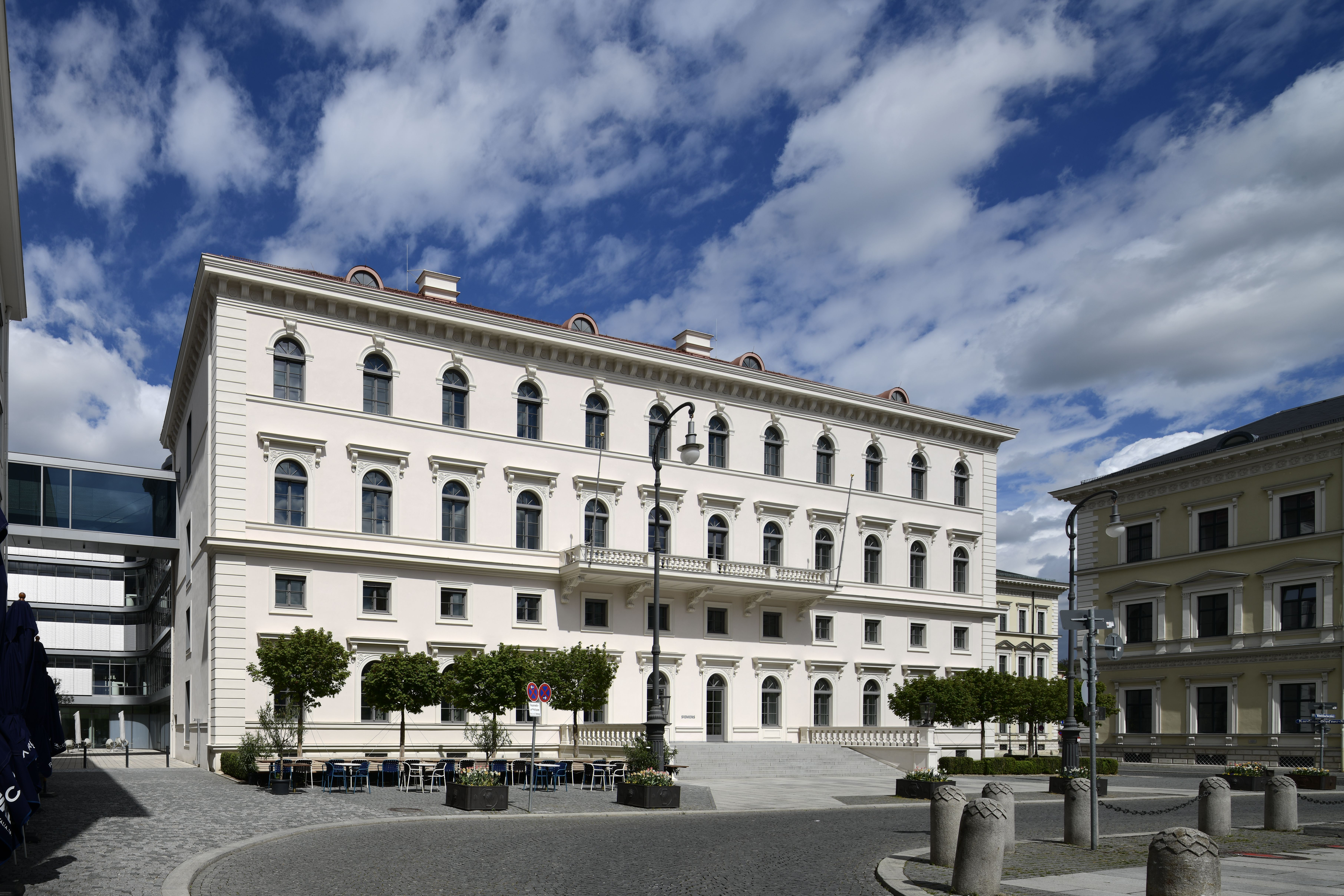
Siemens's headquarters, Munich (front)

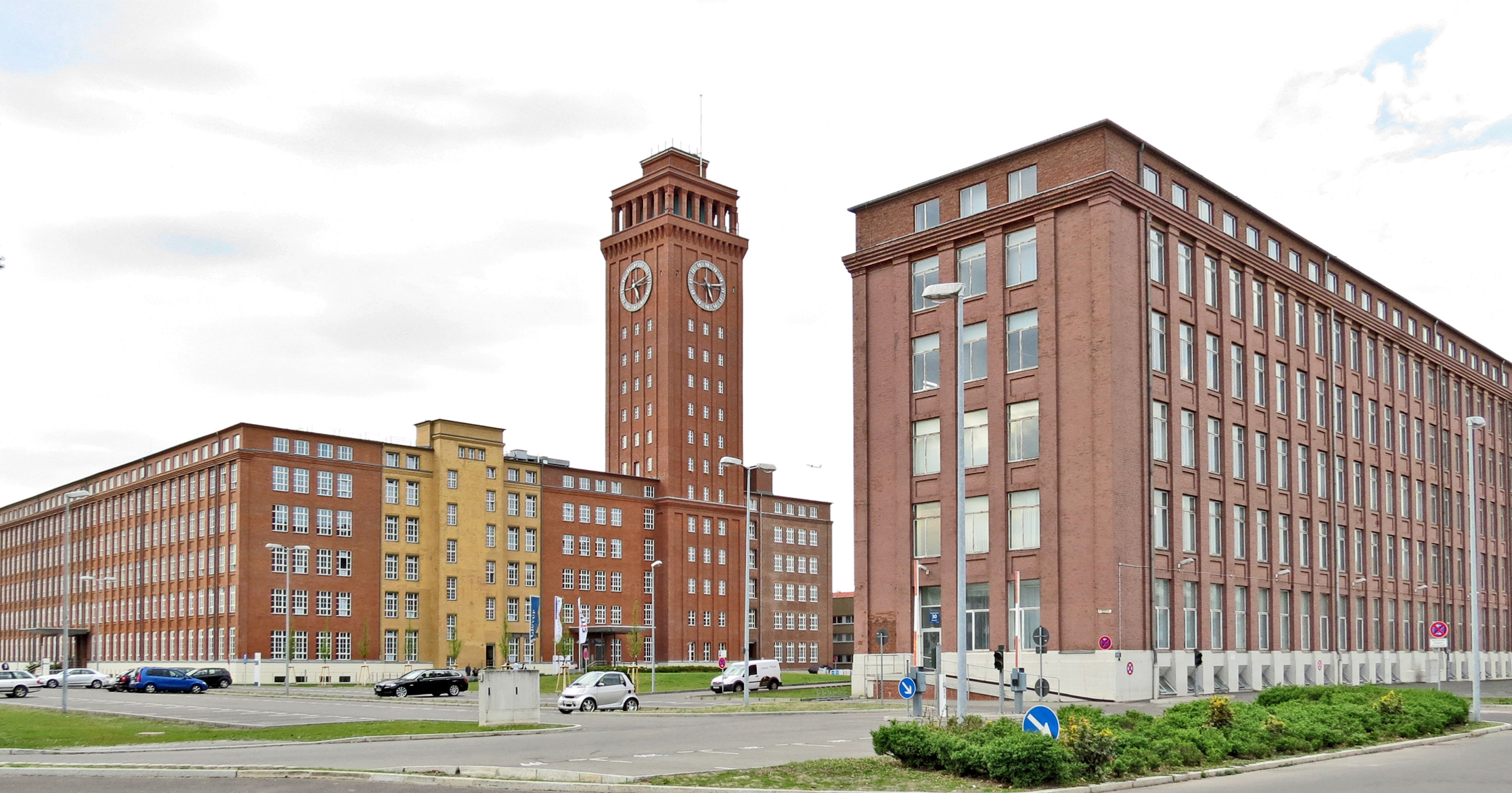
Siemens-Tower in Berlin-Siemensstadt

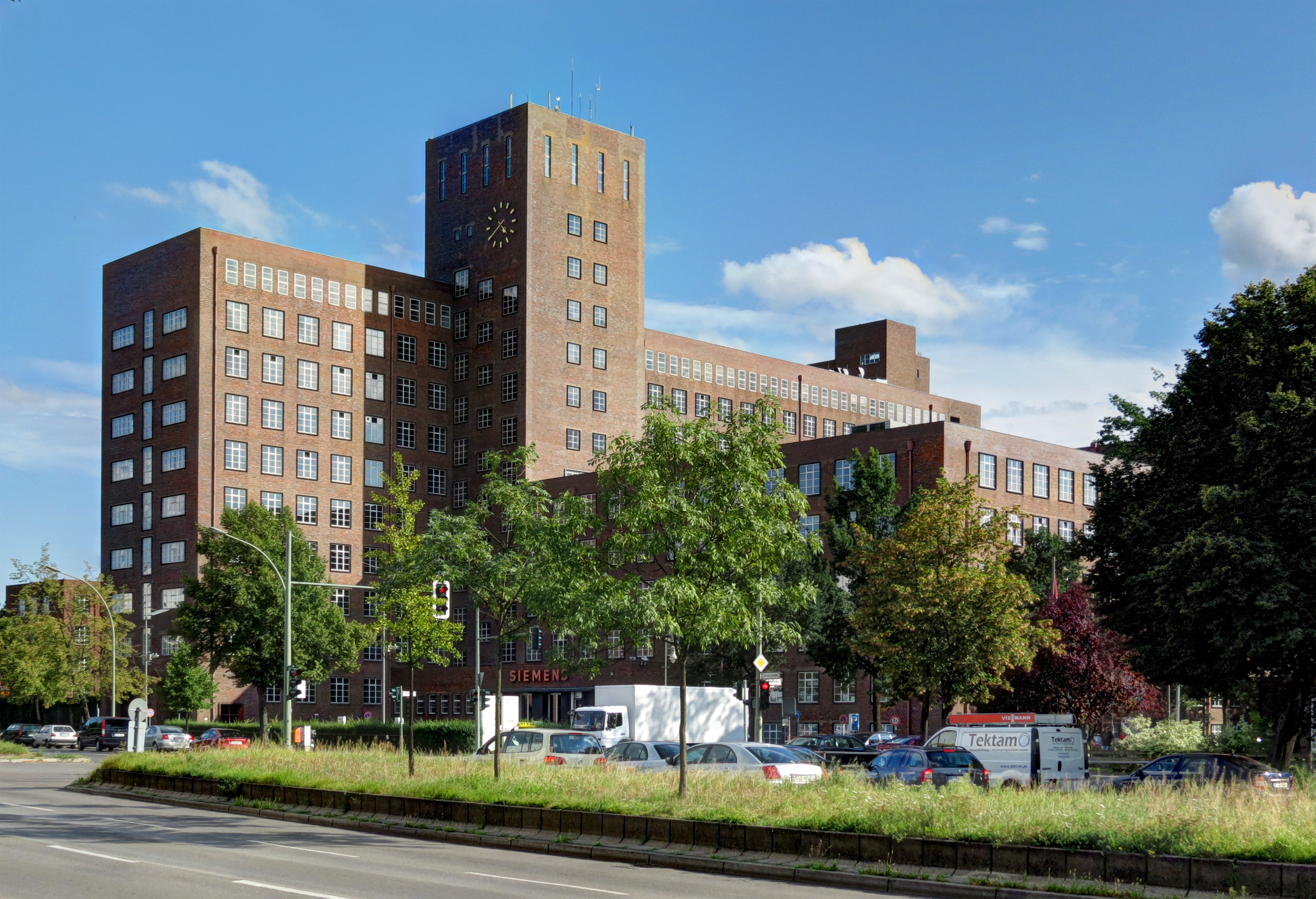
"Wernerwerk" (Werner's Factory) in Berlin-Siemensstadt

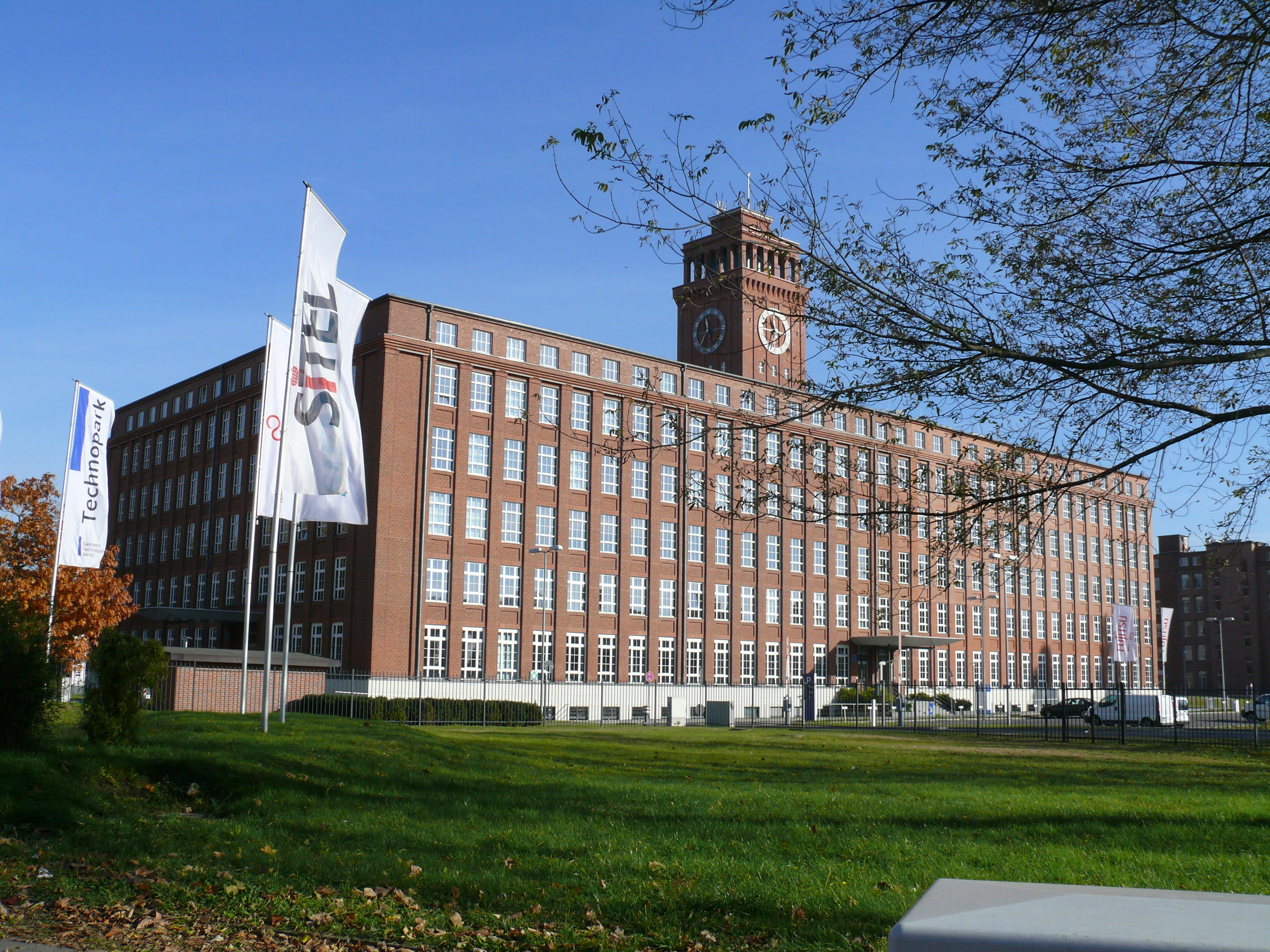
Wernerwerk II in Berlin-Siemensstadt

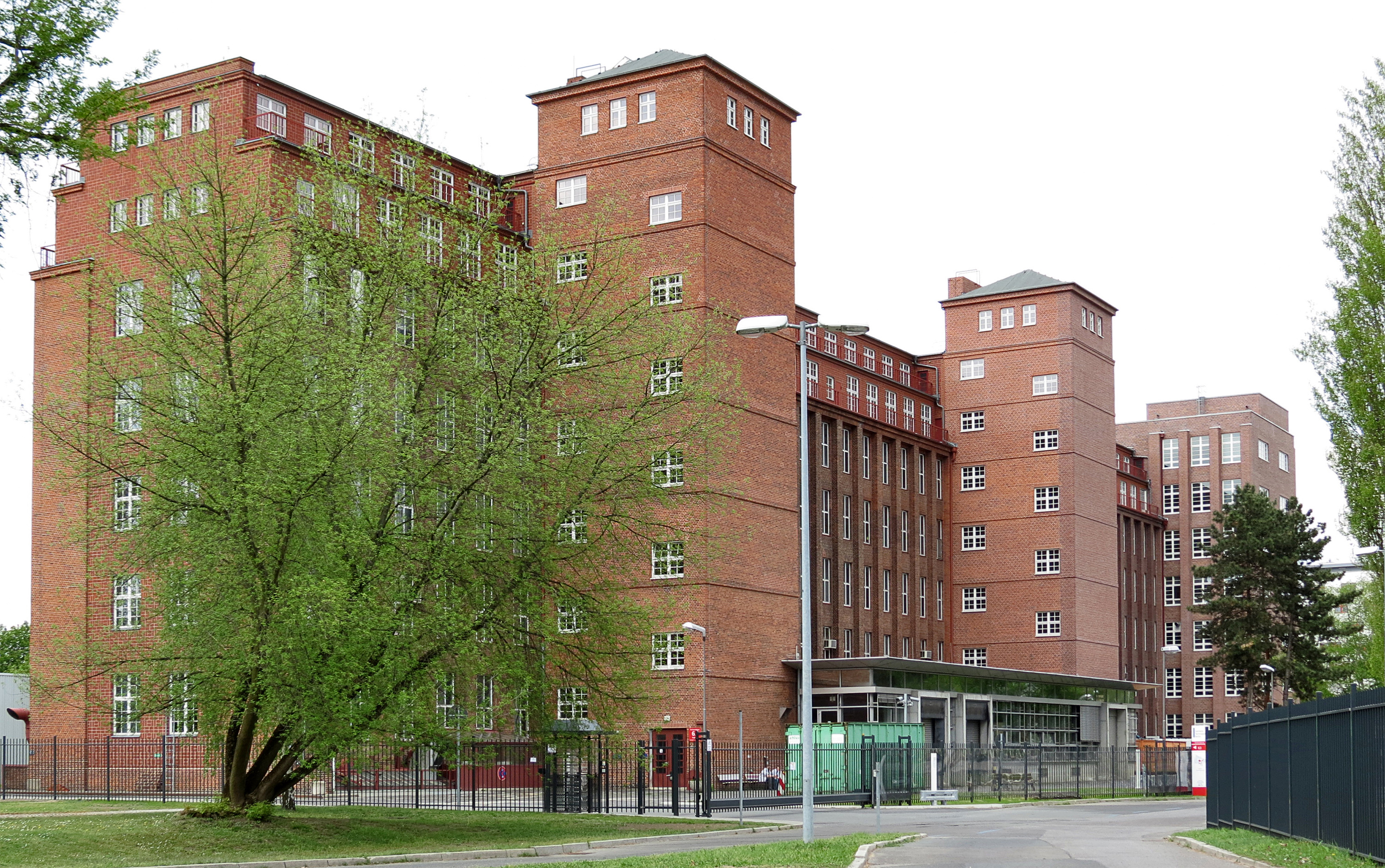
Wernerwerk XV in Berlin-Siemensstadt

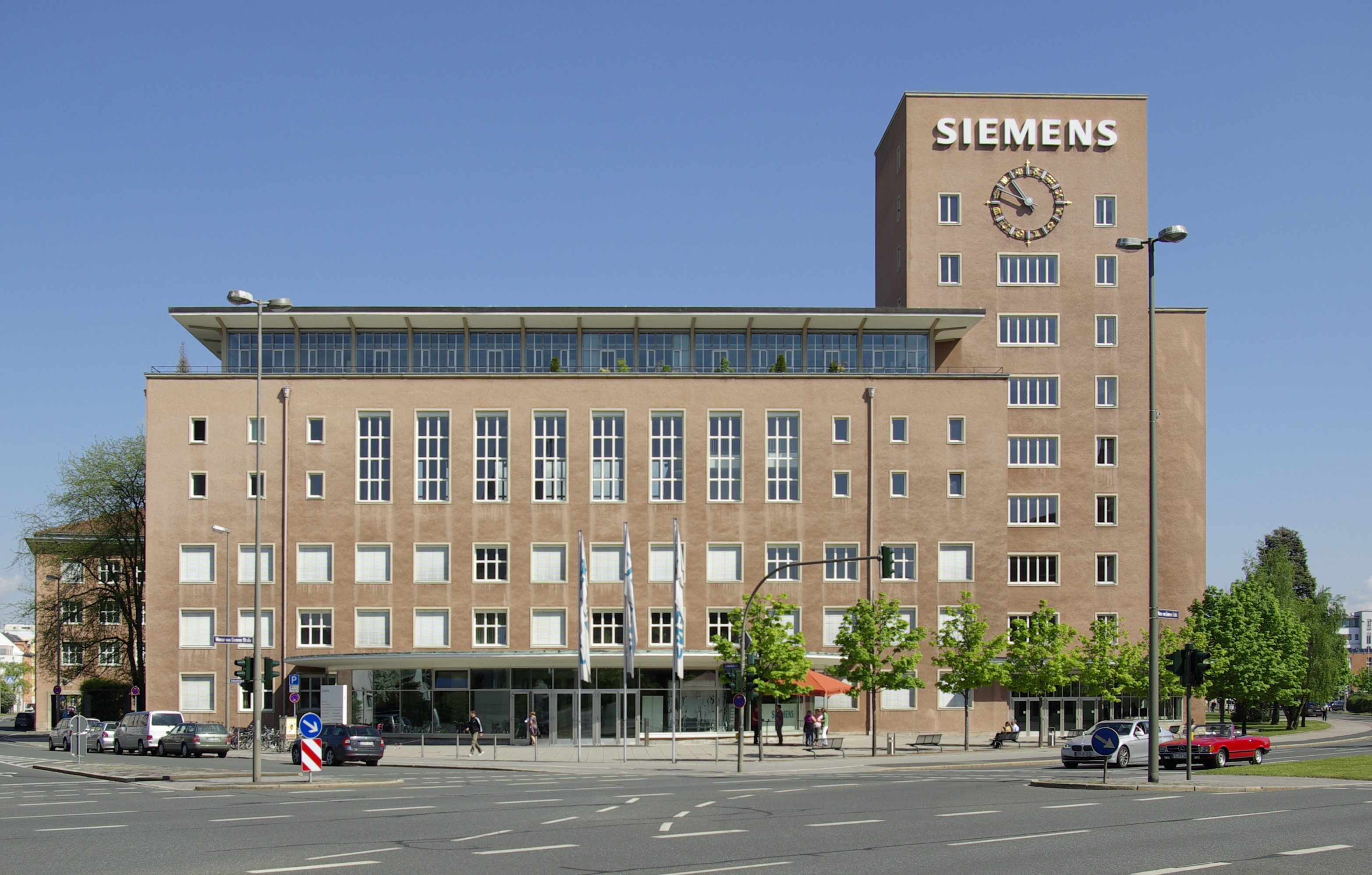
Siemens office building in Erlangen

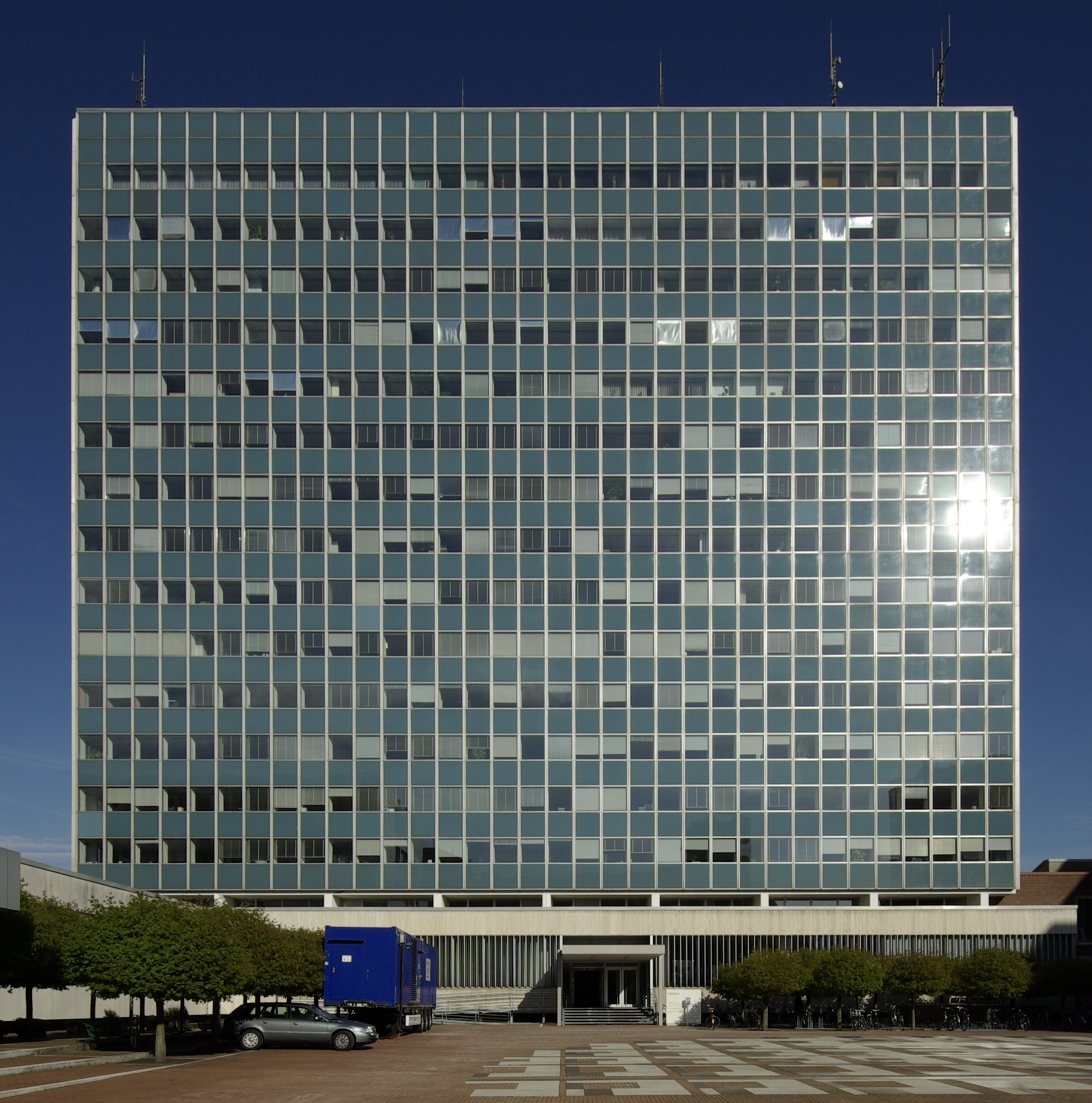
Siemens office building in Erlangen

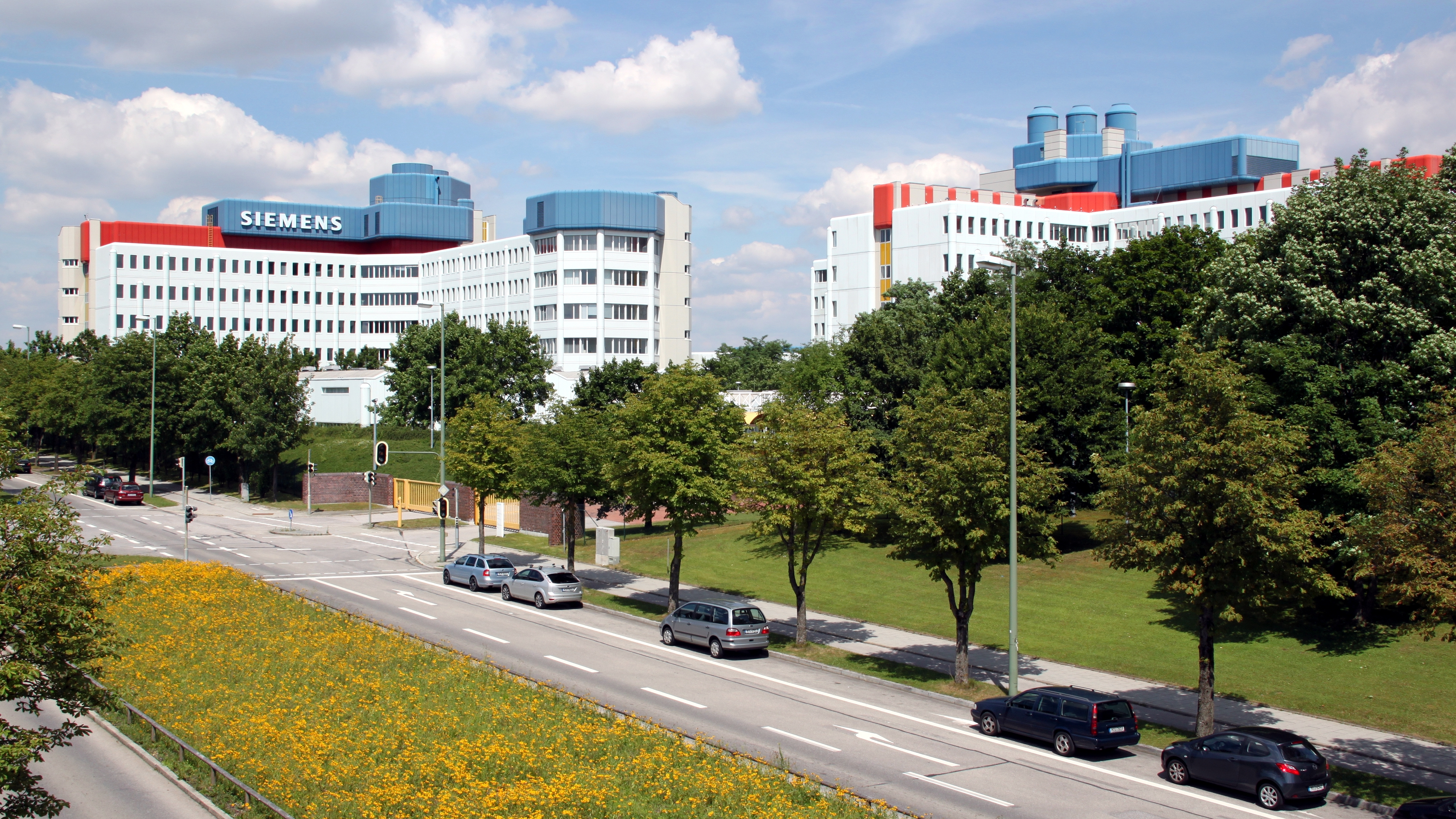
Siemens site in Munich-Perlach

=== Research and development ===
In 2023, Siemens invested a total of €6.1 billion in research and development. As of 30 September 2022, Siemens had approximately 46,900 employees engaged in research and development and held approximately 43,600 patents worldwide.

=== Leadership ===
Chairmen of the Siemens-Schuckertwerke Managing Board (1903 to 1966)

- Alfred Berliner (1903 to 1912)
- Carl Friedrich von Siemens (1912 to 1919)
- Otto Heinrich (1919 to 1920)
- Carl Köttgen (1920 to 1939)
- Rudolf Bingel (1939 to 1945)
- Wolf-Dietrich von Witzleben (1945 to 1949)
- Günther Scharowsky (1949 to 1951)
- Friedrich Bauer (1951 to 1962)
- Bernhard Plettner (1962 to 1966)

Chairmen of the Siemens & Halske / Siemens-Schuckertwerke Supervisory Board (1918 to 1966)

- Wilhelm von Siemens (1918 to 1919)
- Carl Friedrich von Siemens (1919 to 1941)
- Hermann von Siemens (1941 to 1946)
- Friedrich Carl Siemens (1946 to 1948)
- Hermann von Siemens (1948 to 1956)
- Ernst von Siemens (1956 to 1966)

Chairmen of Siemens AG's managing board (1966 to present)

- Hans Kerschbaum, Adolf Lohse, Bernhard Plettner (presidency of the managing board) (1966 to 1967)
- Erwin Hachmann, Bernhard Plettner, Gerd Tacke (presidency of the managing board) (1967 to 1968)
- Gerd Tacke (1968 to 1971)
- Bernhard Plettner (1971 to 1981)
- Karlheinz Kaske (1981 to 1992)
- Heinrich von Pierer (1992 to 2005)
- Klaus Kleinfeld (2005 to 2007)
- Peter Löscher (2007 to 2013)
- Joe Kaeser (2013 to 2021)
- Roland Busch (2021 to present)

Chairmen of the Siemens AG Supervisory Board (1966 to present)

- Ernst von Siemens (1966 to 1971)
- Peter von Siemens (1971 to 1981)
- Bernhard Plettner (1981 to 1988)
- Heribald Närger (1988 to 1993)
- Hermann Franz (1993 to 1998)
- Karl-Hermann Baumann (1998 to 2005)
- Heinrich von Pierer (2005 to 2007)
- Gerhard Cromme (2007 to 2018)
- Jim Hagemann Snabe (2018 to present)

Managing Board (present day)

- Roland Busch (CEO Siemens AG)
- Klaus Helmrich
- Cedrik Neike (CEO Digital Industries)
- Matthias Rebellius (CEO Smart Infrastructure)
- Ralf P. Thomas (CFO)
- Judith Wiese

=== Shareholders ===
The company has issued 881,000,000 shares of common stock. The largest single shareholder continues to be the founding shareholder, the Siemens family, with a stake of 6.9%, while 62% is held by institutional asset managers, the largest being two divisions of the world's largest asset manager BlackRock. Moreover, 83.97% of the shares are considered public float, however including such strategic investors as the State of Qatar (DIC Company Ltd.) with 3.04%, the Government Pension Fund of Norway with 2.5% and Siemens AG itself with 3.04%; and 19% are held by private investors, 13% by investors that are considered unidentifiable. In terms of nationality, 26% are owned by German investors, 21% by US investors, followed by the UK (11%), France (8%), Switzerland (8%) and a number of others (26%).
