= Roland Busch =

German business executive, CEO of Siemens

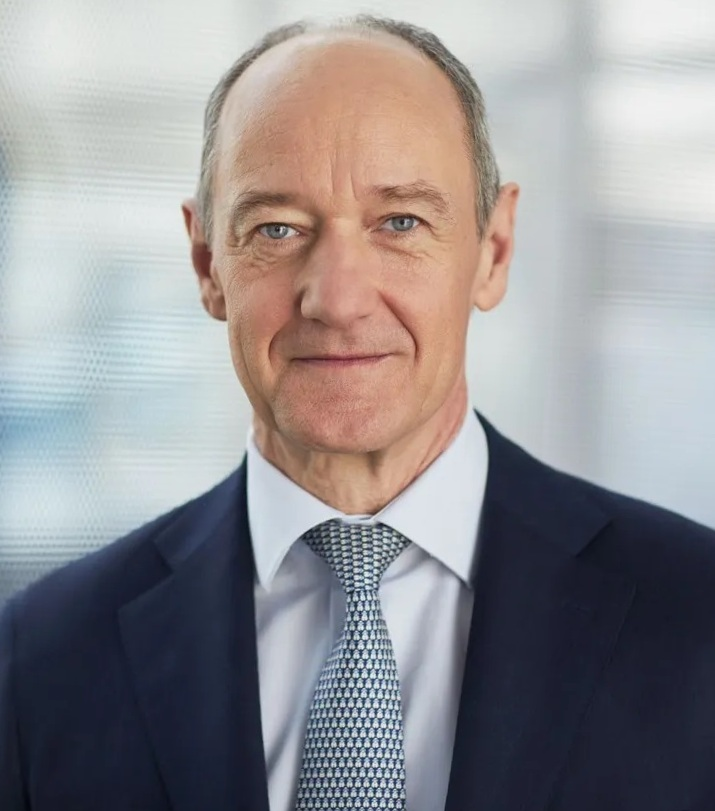
- Busch in 2021
- Born: 22 November 1964 (age 61); Erlangen, West Germany
- Education: University of Erlangen–Nuremberg; University of Grenoble
- Title: CEO of Siemens (2021–present)
- Scientific career
- Thesis: Dissipative Prozesse im Mischzustand von Hoch-Tc-Supraleitern (1993)

Roland Emil Busch (/ˈroʊlənd bʊʃ/; born 22 November 1964) is a German business executive and physicist who serves as the chief executive officer and president of Siemens AG.

Busch joined Siemens in 1994 as a project manager in the global Research Department. He has served in various leadership roles, including Chief Technology Officer from 2016 to 2020 and Deputy CEO from 2019 to 2021. In 2021, he succeeded Joe Kaeser as the CEO and President of Siemens.

== Early life and education ==
Roland Busch was born on 22 November 1964, in Erlangen, Bavaria. His father worked as a primary school principal, while his mother was employed at a local bank before becoming a full-time homemaker to care for Busch and his older brother.

He attended school in Erlangen and developed an interest in mathematics and science.

Busch obtained a degree in physics from Friedrich Alexander University (FAU), also known as the University of Erlangen-Nuremberg, with a thesis on Quantum Chromodynamics Theory. He later completed his doctoral dissertation on high-temperature superconductivity at FAU, earning his doctorate in 1994. During this time, he worked with physicist Günter Ries at Siemens, who was involved in MRI scanner development. Under Ries' mentorship, Busch explored the practical applications of physics, which influenced his decision to join Siemens after he completed his doctorate. Busch also holds an undergraduate degree from the University of Grenoble.

== Career ==
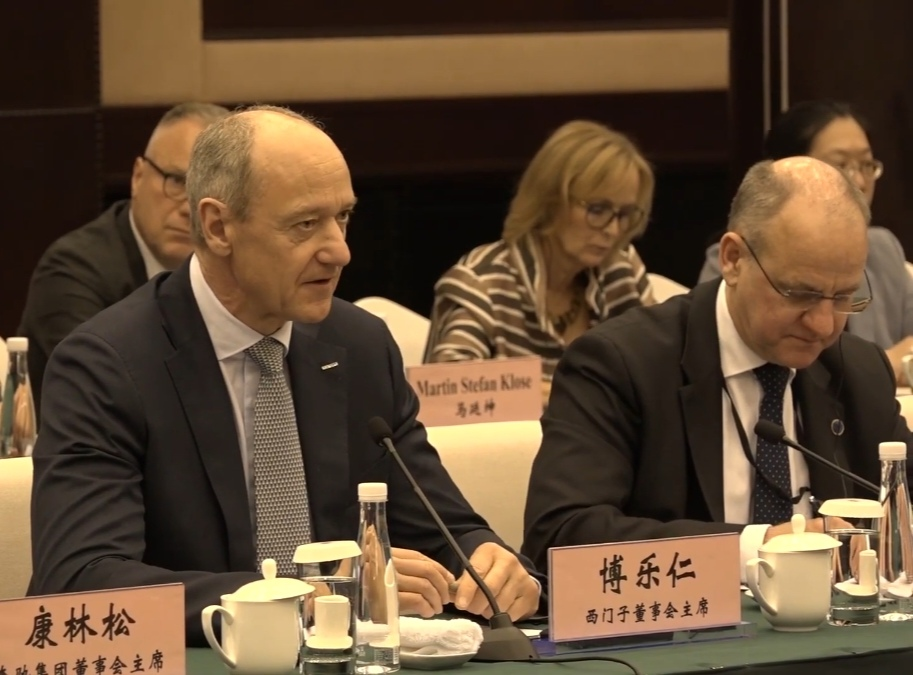
Busch during a visit to Chongqing, China in 2024

Busch's journey with Siemens began in 1994 as a project head in Corporate Research and Development at Siemens' Erlangen office. He held various positions at Siemens AG and Siemens VDO Automotive until 2005, when he became President and CEO of Siemens VDO Automotive Asia Pacific Co. Ltd. in Shanghai, China, overseeing the company's operations in the Asia-Pacific region.

In 2007, he returned to Germany to lead the Mass Transit Division within the Transportation Systems Group (now Siemens Mobility), and in 2008, he became Head of Corporate Strategies in the Corporate Development Department at Siemens AG. In 2011, Busch joined the Managing Board of Siemens AG and served as Chief Technology Officer and Chief Operating Officer until 2021.

=== CEO of Siemens AG ===
Roland Busch succeeded Joe Kaeser as President and CEO of Siemens AG. During his tenure, Siemens introduced a range of technologies combining physical and digital systems. In 2022, Siemens launched Siemens Xcelerator, a digital business platform described by the company as a tool for integrating hardware, software, and services to support industrial digitalization.

In June 2022, Siemens expanded its partnership with Nvidia, led by CEO Jensen Huang, to work on the development of the industrial metaverse, an initiative that combines Siemens' simulation tools with Nvidia's AI platforms to create digital twins for industrial applications. Busch highlighted these technologies, including digital twins and industrial AI, during his keynote speech at CES 2024.

In October 2023, Busch and Microsoft CEO Satya Nadella jointly announced the launch of the Siemens Industrial Copilot, an AI assistant designed to support automation and engineering processes. Thyssenkrupp Automation Engineering was among the early adopters, deploying the system in battery machinery used in electric vehicle production.

Under Busch's tenure, Siemens formed partnerships with companies such as Nvidia, Microsoft, and Amazon Web Services (AWS) to incorporate generative AI and cloud computing into its industrial technology offerings.

== Other activities ==
- Chairman of the Asia-Pacific Committee (APA) of German Business
- Supervisory Board Member, Munich Re (since 2024)
- Chairman of the University Council, Friedrich-Alexander-Universität Erlangen-Nuremberg (FAU)
- Vice Chairman of the Karl Heinz Beckurts Foundation
- Member of the Board, Federation of German Industries (BDI)
- Member of the Management Board, German Electrical and Electronic Manufacturers' Association (ZVEI)
- Member of the Board of Trustees, ESMT Foundation (European School of Management and Technology, Berlin)
- Member, International Business Leaders Advisory Committee (IBLAC), Shanghai
- Member of the Advisory Board, Tsinghua University School of Economics and Management, Beijing
- Member, The Business Council, Washington, D.C.

== Personal life ==
Busch resides in Erlangen and maintains a second residence in Munich near the Siemens headquarters. Known for his intense work schedule, he is reportedly the first to arrive at the company's fitness studio each morning. According to Frankfurter Allgemeine Zeitung, during his second marriage, he returned to work within an hour of the ceremony, followed by a weekend honeymoon in Austria. In his youth, he played guitar in a local band in Erlangen.

== Views ==
In interviews, Busch has described his political orientation as centrist, expressing opposition to both right-wing populism and radical left-wing positions. While acknowledging the importance of addressing climate change, he has defended market-based economic systems, citing capitalism's role in reducing global poverty and increasing life expectancy.

== Awards and honors ==
- Bavarian Order of Merit (2023)
- In 2024, Handelsblatt named Busch Strategist of the Year for his role in the company's transformation.
