= Jim Hagemann Snabe =

Danish businessman (born 1965)

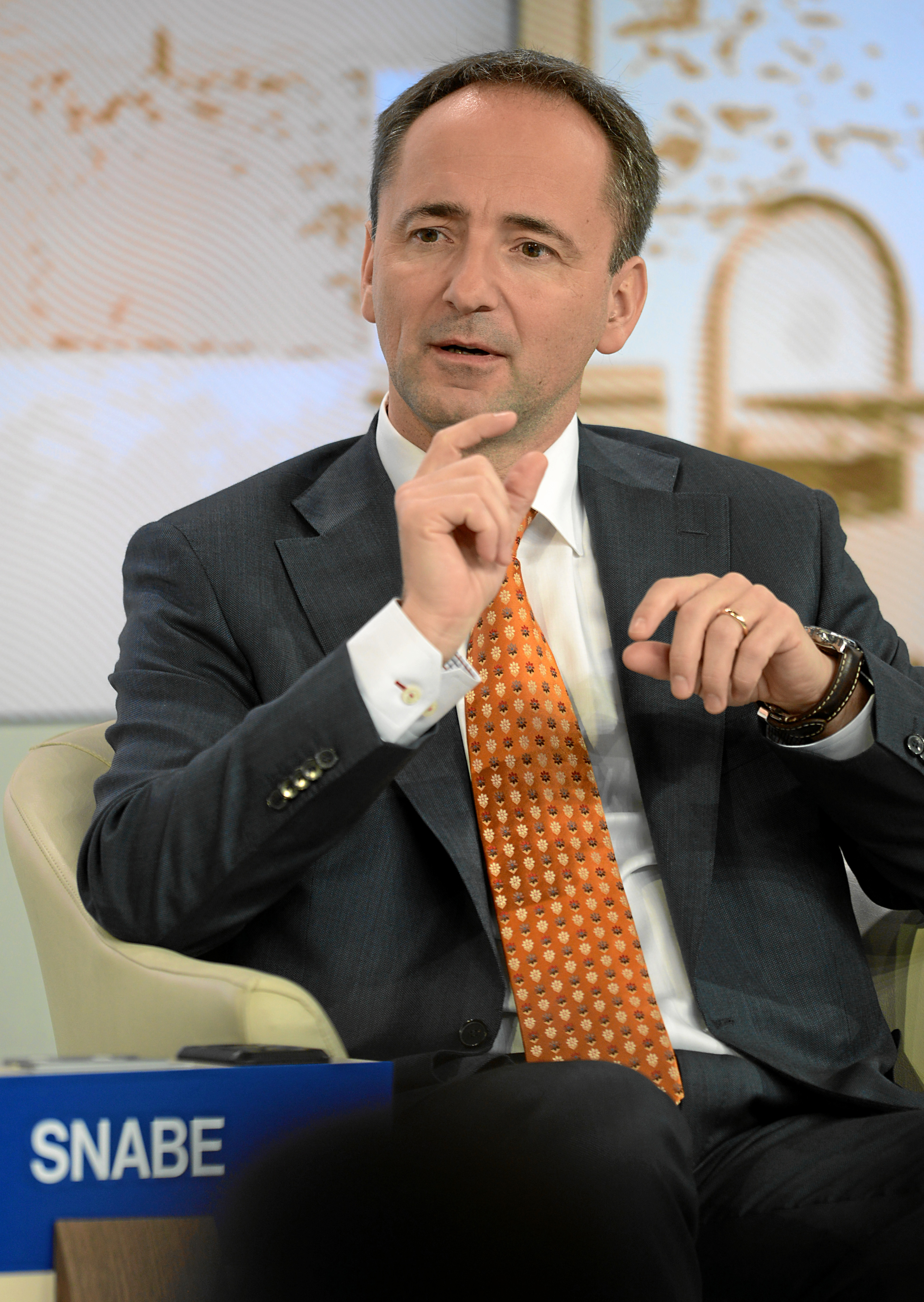
- Snabe in 2013
- Born: October 27, 1965 (age 60); Egedal, Denmark
- Education: Aarhus School of Business
- Occupation: Businessman

Jim Hagemann Snabe (born October 27, 1965) is a Danish businessman, and the chairman of Siemens. Together with Bill McDermott, Snabe was co-CEO of the German technology company SAP, before becoming member of the board of directors at SAP. Snabe has also been an adjunct professor at Copenhagen Business School since 2016 and is a member of the board of trustees at the World Economic Forum.

== Career ==
Snabe started his career at SAP in 1990. After one year as a trainee, he became Consulting Manager for SAP Denmark. In 1994 Snabe left SAP to be Principal at IBM Denmark but returned to SAP after only two years.

=== SAP ===
After three years as managing director of the Swedish SAP subsidiary, Snabe was appointed managing director of the SAP Nordic region. Shortly thereafter, he held several management positions for the SAP EMEA region. From July 2008 on, Snabe was part of the executive board of SAP. After the departure of Léo Apotheker, Snabe and his colleague McDermott took on the position as Co-CEO for SAP AG on February 8, 2010.

On July 21, 2013, it was announced that Snabe would leave the position of Co-CEO in 2014 to be part of the SAP Supervisory Board. On the SAP Annual General Assembly on May 21, 2014, he was elected to the Supervisory Board. In October 2013 Snabe was elected to join the board of Siemens AG. In 2017 he was elected to be the Chairman of the Supervisory Board of Siemens AG. Mr. Snabe is also a member of the Board of Trustees at the World Economic Forum.

== Other activities ==
Snabe is adjunct professor at Copenhagen Business School in the fields of leadership, responsible business and change management.

In 2017, Snabe wrote the book "Dreams and Details: Reinvent Your Business and Your Leadership from a Position of Strength” together with Mikael Trolle. Drawing from their leadership experience, Snabe and Trolle set out to offer a new leadership model, which unites inspiration, ambition, innovation and employee empowerment to succeed in the modern world. The model builds on Snabe's conviction that businesses have to reinvent themselves to combine profits with responsible and sustainable conduct. In November 2018, Snabe and Trolle founded the Dreams and Details Academy, aiming to change leadership through consulting and educational services.

=== Corporate boards ===
- Deutsche Bank, Member of the Global Advisory Board (since 2022)
- Northvolt, Chairman of the Board of Directors (2022 - 2024)
- Maersk, Member of the Board of Directors (2016-2022), Chair of the Board of Directors (2017-2022)
- Siemens, Chair of the Supervisory Board (since 2018)
- Allianz, Member of the Supervisory Board (-2022)
- Temasek, Member of the Board of Directors (since 2025)
- C3 AI, Member of the Board of Directors (since 2021; on indefinite leave as of June, 2026)

=== Non-profit organizations ===
- World Economic Forum (WEF), Member of the Board of Trustees (since 2014)

== Personal life ==
At the age of two, Snabe and his parents lived in the Greenland capital of Nuuk for seven years, where his father worked as a helicopter pilot. From 1984 to 1990 he studied Operations research at the Aarhus School of Business. Currently, Snabe lives in Copenhagen with his wife and two children.

== Awards ==
- Academy of International Business (AIB) The International Executive of the Year Award (2019)

== Publications ==
- Jim Hagemann Snabe et al (2009). Business process management:The SAP Roadmap. Bonn, Galileo Press / SAP Press, 2009
- Snabe, Jim Hagemann and Trolle, Mikael (2019). Dreams and details: Reinvent your business and your leadership from a position of strength. [Valby]: Spintype. ISBN 978-87-7192-053-6. OCLC 1111587499.
- Thinggaard, Lars and Snabe, Jim Hagemann (2020). Tech for Life: Putting trust back in technology. Spintype. ISBN 9788771920659
