= Mendix =

Low-code development platform

- Industry: Low-code development; Application development; Digital transformation; Enterprise software
- Founded: 2005; 21 years ago
- Founders: Roald Kruit; Derek Roos; Derckjan Kruit
- Headquarters: Rotterdam, Netherlands
- Area served: Worldwide
- Key people: Raymond Kok (CEO)
- Number of employees: 1,400 (2023)
- Parent: Siemens
- Website: mendix.com

Mendix is a cloud-based low-code application development platform that provides tools for organizations to build web and mobile applications using visual drag-and-drop elements. Mendix was founded in 2005 in Rotterdam, the Netherlands. Its US headquarters are located in Boston. Since 2018, Mendix has been a Siemens subsidiary.

== History ==
Mendix was founded in Rotterdam, the Netherlands, by Roald Kruit, Derek Roos, and Derckjan Kruit. Roald, a freelance software developer at the time, noticed a communication disconnect between software developers and end users, which often led to dissatisfaction with the developed applications. Using a visual development language, Mendix's founders wanted to create a platform that would enable better collaboration and understanding between developers and business users.

In October 2011, Mendix raised $13 million with its first round of venture capital funding.

In August 2018, the company's co-founder and CEO announced its acquisition by Siemens for $730 million in cash. The deal was finalized later that year. It was reported that Mendix would continue to operate as an independent entity. Siemens customers can use Mendix to extend functionality of Siemens software and create their own applications on top of it, such as connecting various IT systems or tracking the production of products in various facilities.

In February 2024, Raymond Kok was appointed as Mendix's new CEO.

== Features ==
Mendix aims to support the entire software development lifecycle (SDLC) with an integrated development environment (IDE) with tools for businesses to build, test, iterate, and deploy applications driven by a visual programming language. Organizations can use their own or Mendix's servers to host their applications. According to Roos, the platform should not replace professional programmers instead of promoting collaboration with them, as "[p]rofessional IT people supply the technical, low-coder the logistics theme".

In 2014, Mendix introduced a free community edition of the platform without the private server deployment, app monitoring, backup, resource management, and enterprise support features.

The system is built on Java now, and starting from version Mendix 10.18, it will be based on React.

At CES 2024 in January 2024, Siemens and AWS announced they were integrating Mendix with Amazon Bedrock, a machine learning platform used to build generative artificial intelligence applications on AWS cloud computing platform.

Mendix enables the development of a wide range of business applications, including customer relationship management (CRM) systems, booking and reservation applications, e-commerce platforms, supply chain management tools, workflow automation solutions, healthcare management systems, and financial applications.
