= Power distribution =

Power distribution may refer to:

== Electricity and engineering ==
- Electric power distribution: the system of delivering electricity from the transmission system to individual consumers.
- Power distribution unit: a device fitted with multiple outputs designed to distribute electric power, especially to racks of computers and networking equipment within a data center.
- Power distribution center: a prefabricated enclosure used to house medium and low-voltage switchgear and other electrical components.

== Physics ==
- Spectral power distribution: in optics and radiometry, the power per unit area per unit wavelength of a light source.

== Probability ==
- The Inverse-Pareto distribution, a probability distribution used in economics and insurance, often related to the disproportionate "power" of the tail in a population.
