= List of people from Berlin =

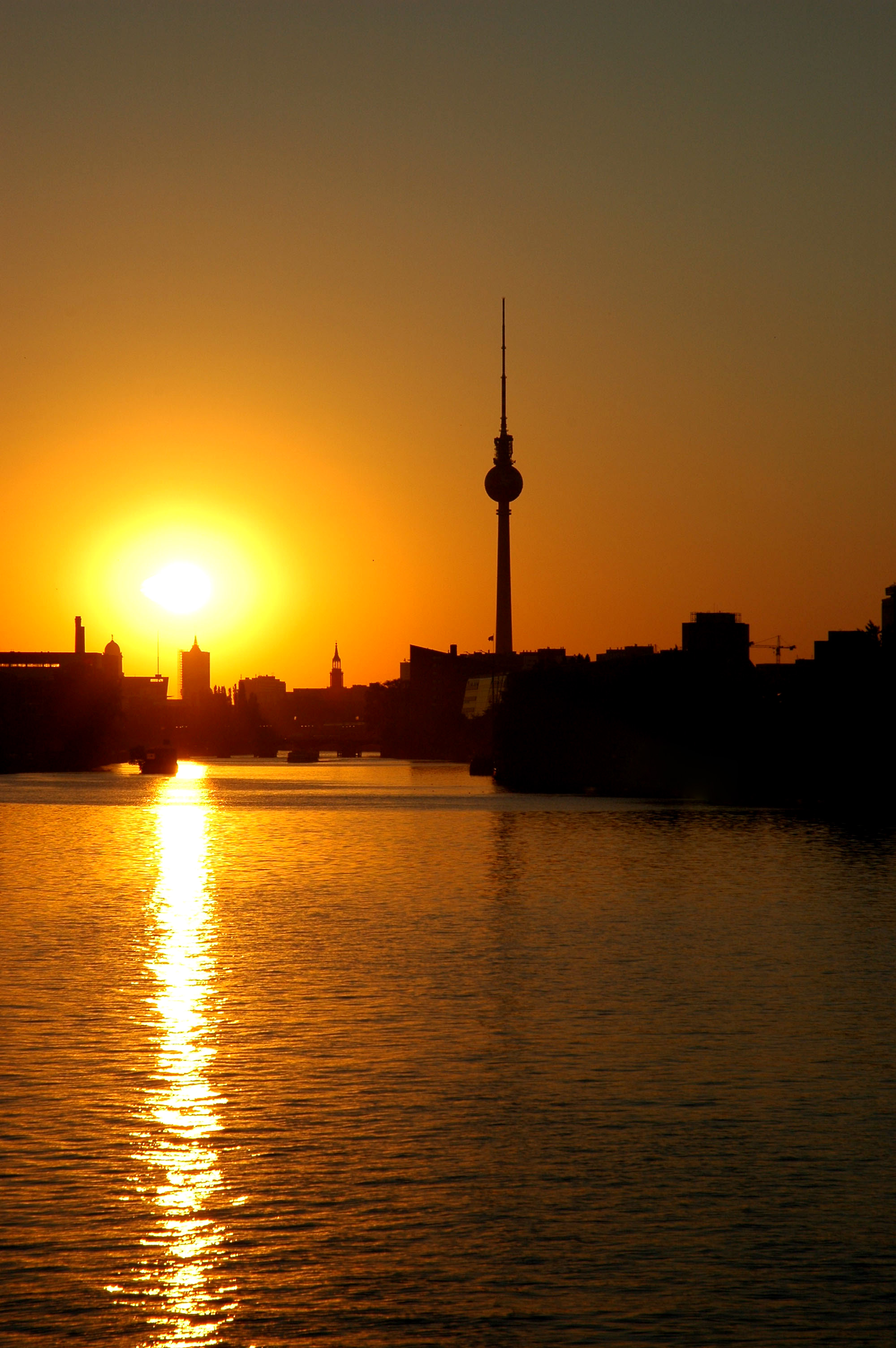
Berlin

The following is a list of notable people who were born in, or spent substantial time in, Berlin, a city (and state) in the European country of Germany.

== Politicians and statesmen ==
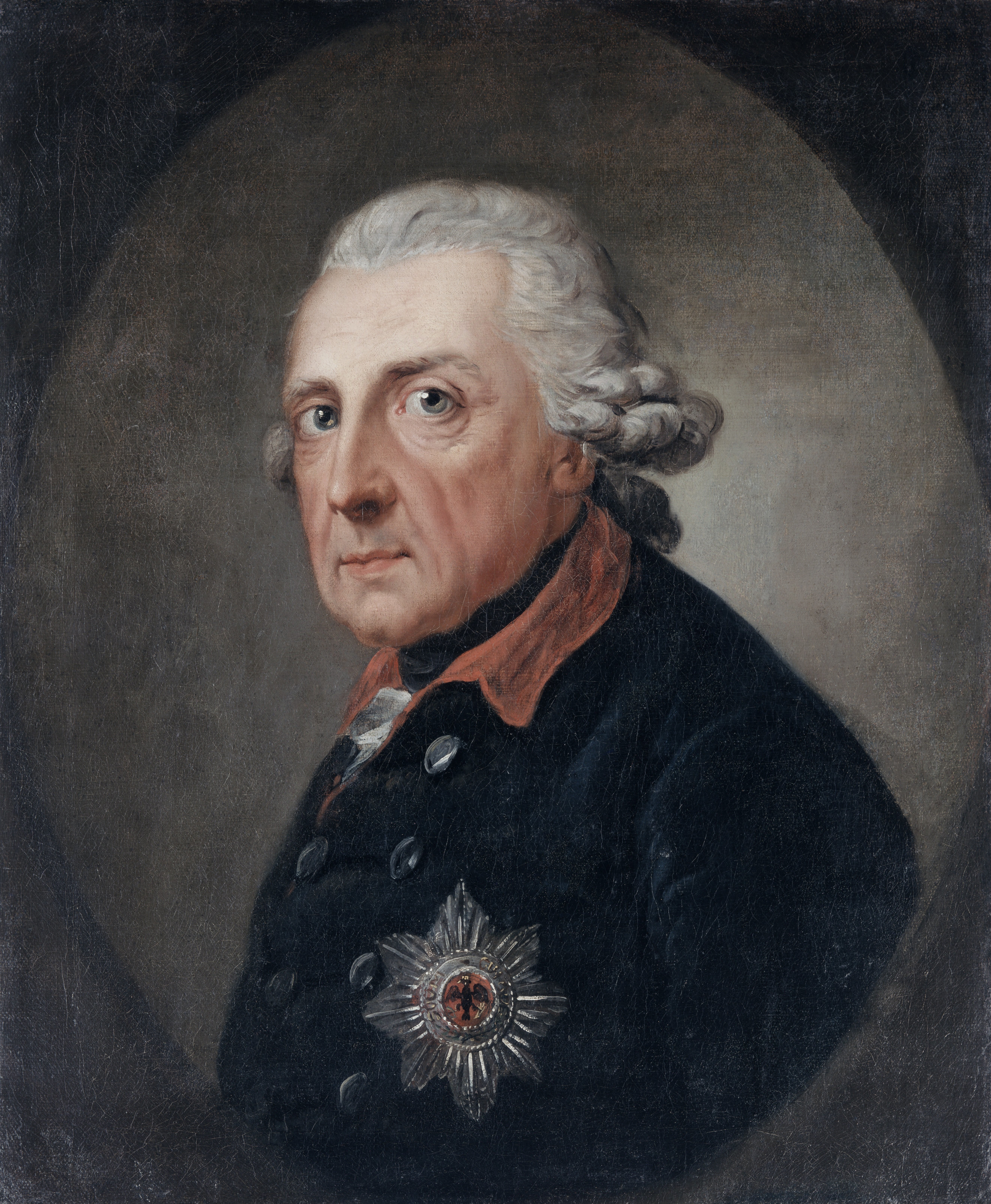
Frederick II of Prussia, Frederick the Great

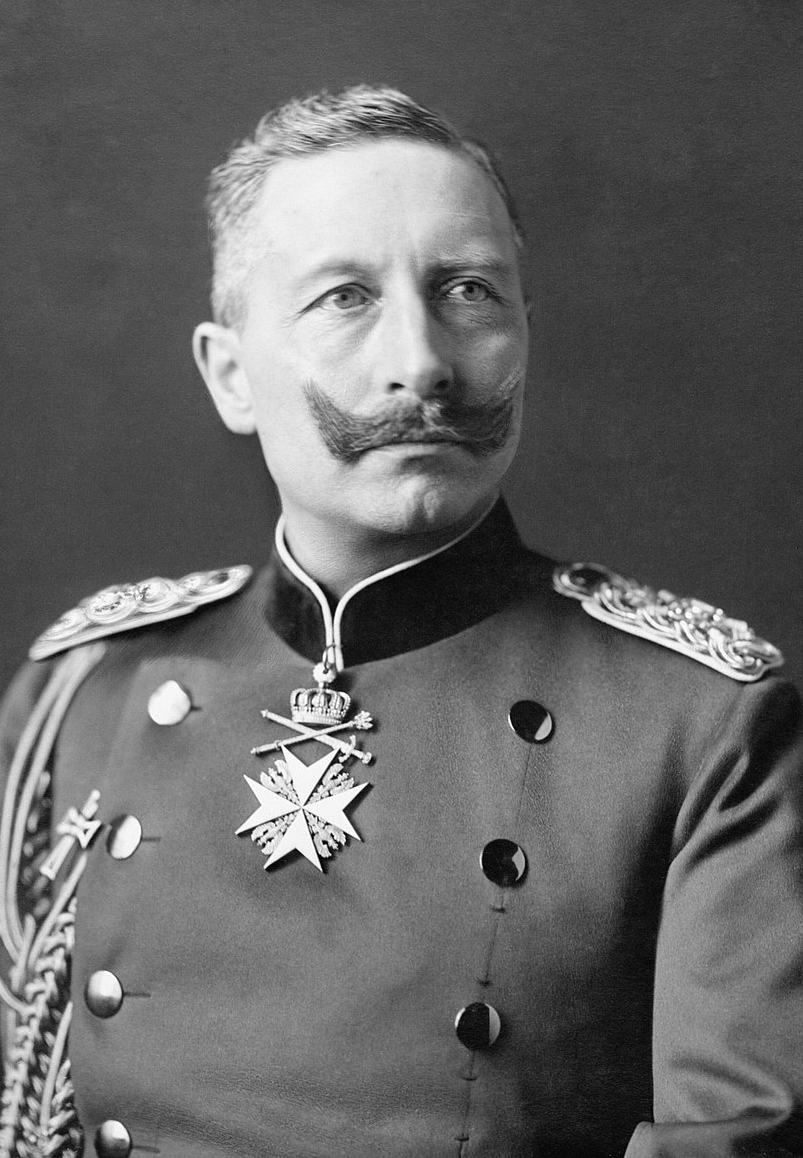
Kaiser Wilhelm II of Germany, 1902

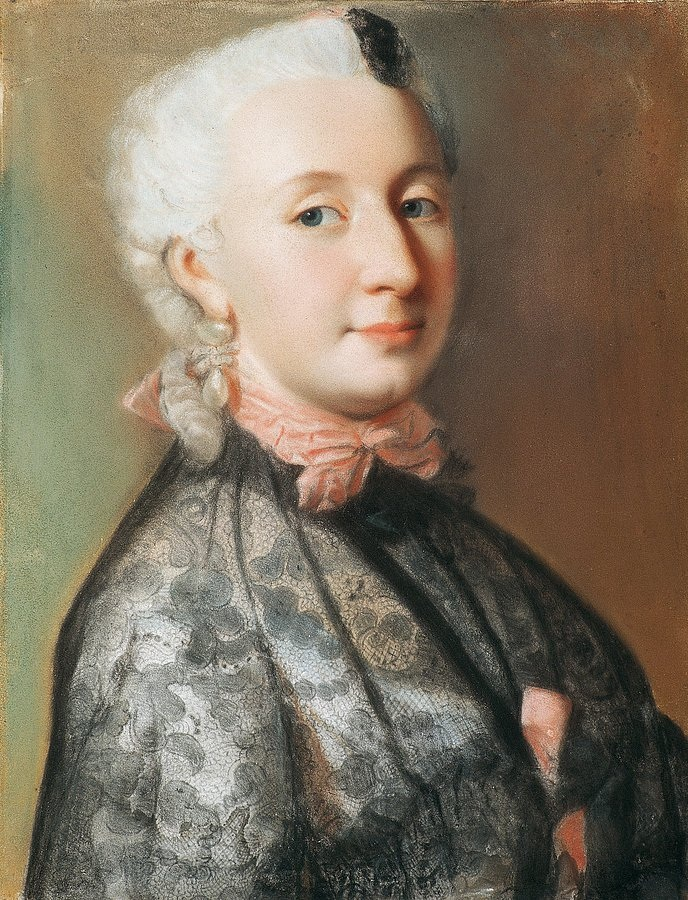
Wilhelmine of Prussia, circa 1745

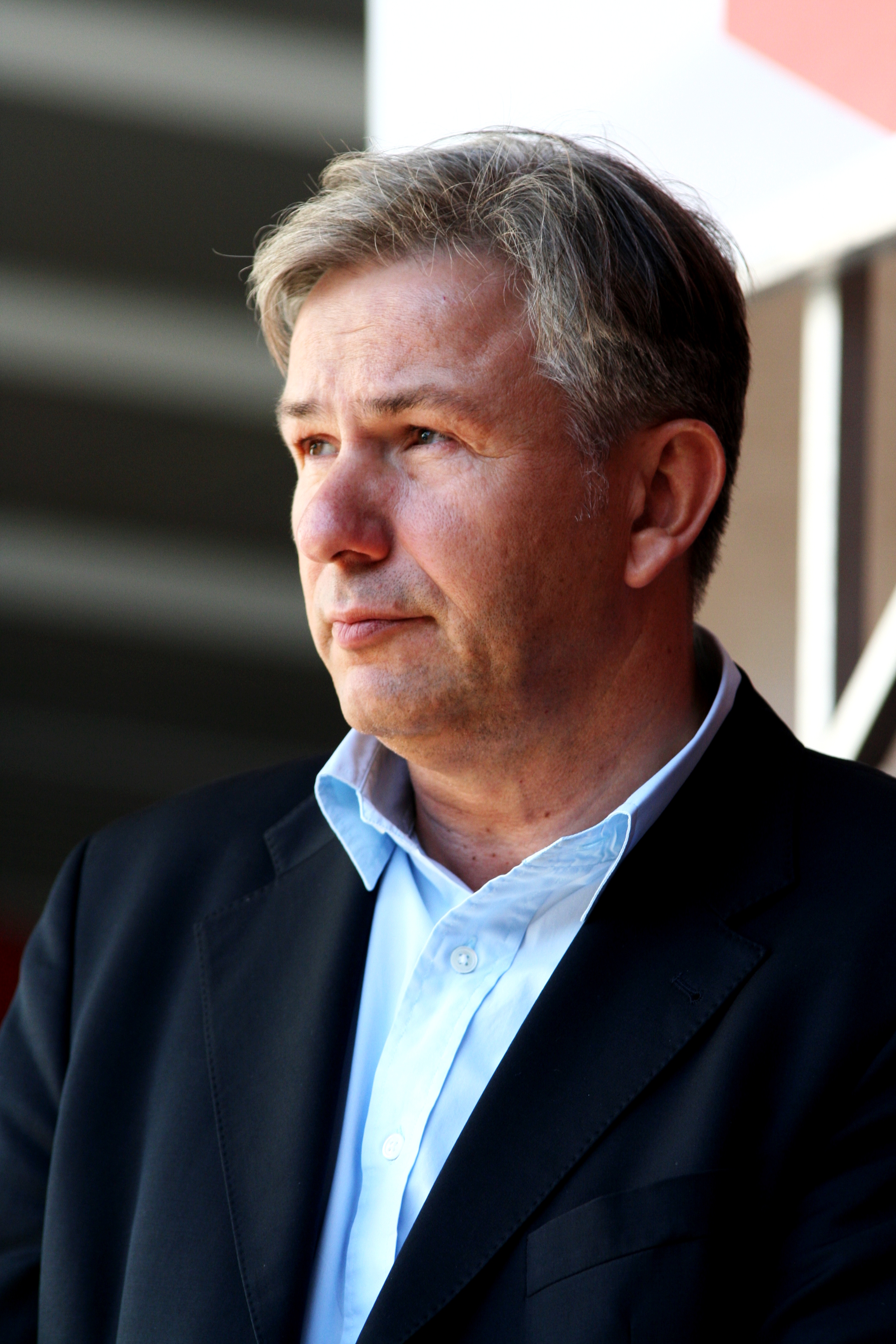
Klaus Wowereit, 2009

- Count Karl-Wilhelm Finck von Finckenstein (1714–1800), Prussian statesman and politician
- Friedrich Ancillon (1767–1837), Prussian historian and statesman
- Adolf Heinrich von Arnim-Boitzenburg (1803–1868), statesman and politician
- Eduard Bernstein (1850–1932), politician (SPD), member of the Reichstag
- Berthold von Bernstorff (1842–1917), politician and owner of Schiermonnikoog
- Anna of Brandenburg (1487–1514), noblewoman and mother of Christian III (King of Denmark)
- Rudy Boschwitz (born 1930), U.S. senator from Minnesota and former U.S. ambassador to the United Nations Commission on Human Rights, born to a Jewish family in Berlin
- Rainer Brüderle (born 1945), politician (FDP)
- Sawsan Chebli (born 1978), politician (SPD)
- Eberhard Diepgen (born 1941), politician (CDU), governing mayor of Berlin
- Kurt Eisner (1867–1919), politician (SPD, USPD)
- Frederick the Great (1712–1786), king of Prussia from 1740 to 1786
- Frederick William (1620–1688), elector of Brandenburg and duke of Prussia 1640–1688
- Frederick William I (1688–1740), king in Prussia and elector of Brandenburg 1713–1740
- Frederick William II (1744–1797), king of Prussia 1786–1797
- Stefan Gelbhaar (born 1976), politician (Bündnis 90/Die Grünen)
- Ernst Ludwig von Gerlach (1795–1877), judge, politician and journalist
- George V of Hanover (1819–1878), king of Hanover 1851–1866
- Gregor Gysi (born 1948), politician (The Left)
- Klaus Gysi (1912–1999), Minister of Culture and state secretary for church affairs of GDR
- Prince Friedrich Karl of Prussia (1828–1885), brother of future German emperor William I
- Reinhard Klimmt (born 1942), politician (SPD), prime minister of Saarland
- Hans Luther (1879–1962), chancellor in the Weimar Republic
- Otto von Manteuffel (1844–1913), Chairman of German Conservative Party
- David McAllister (born 1971), politician (CDU), Prime Minister of Niedersachsen
- Erich Mielke (1907–2000), head of the Stasi
- Petra Pau (born 1963), politician (The Left)
- Hugo Preuss (1860–1925), lawyer and "father of the Weimar Constitution"
- Jesko von Puttkamer (1855–1917), colonial military chief, and nine times governor of Cameroon
- Walther Rathenau (1867–1922), industrialist, politician (DDP) and Foreign Minister of the Weimar Republic
- Ernst Schellenberg (1907-1984), politician (SPD)
- Baldur von Schirach (1907–1974), leader of the Hitlerjugend 1931–1940, Reich governor in Vienna
- Heinrich Schoene (1889–1945), SA general and Generalkommissar in Ukraine
- Rupert Scholz (born 1937), politician (CDU)
- Käte Selbmann (1906–1962), teacher and politician (KPD/SED/DFD)
- Paul Singer (1844–1911), SPD co-founder, whose chairman and Reichstag, producer
- Willi Stoph (1914–1999), politician (SED), Chairman of the State Council
- Gustav Stresemann (1878–1929), politician (DVP), chancellor and foreign minister of the Weimar Republic, Nobel Peace Prize laureate
- Otto Wels (1873–1939), politician (SPD)
- William I, German Emperor (1797–1888), German emperor
- Wilhelm II, German Emperor (1859–1941), German emperor
- Wilhelmine of Prussia (1709–1758), Margravine of Brandenburg-Bayreuth
- Klaus Wowereit (born 1953), politician (SPD), governing mayor of Berlin 2001–2014

== Businesspeople ==
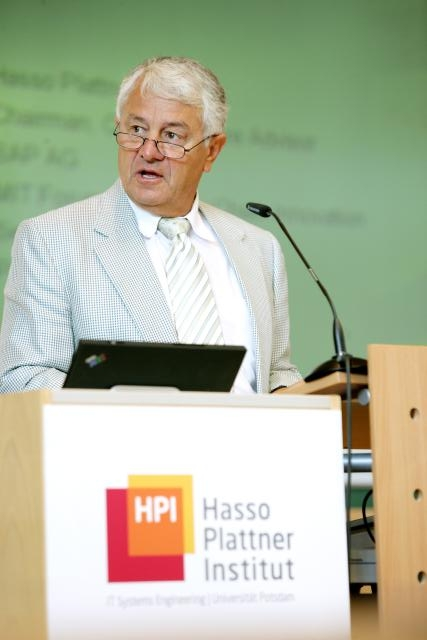
Hasso Plattner, 2006

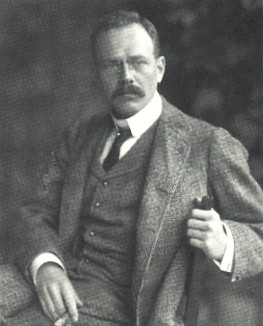
Carl Friedrich von Siemens, before 1916

- Ellen Allien, musician, DJ, founder of music label BPitch Control
- Heinz Berggruen (1914–2007), art dealer
- Ernst Dümmler (1830–1902), bookseller and historian
- Alexander Duncker (1813–1897), publisher and bookseller
- Friedrich Karl Flick (1927–2006), industrialist and billionaire
- Albert Göring (1895–1966), engineer and business manager
- Klaus and Eva Herlitz (born 1947 and 1952, respectively), business people and the initiators of the Buddy Bears
- Günter Herlitz (1913–2010), business people
- Bernhard Koehler (1849–1927), industrialist and art collector
- Gustav Langenscheidt (1832–1895), language teacher, book publisher, and the founder of the Langenscheidt Publishing Group
- Ernst Litfaß (1816–1874), publisher, inventor of the Litfaßsäule
- Joseph Mendelssohn (1770–1848), banker
- Franz Oppenheim (1852–1929), German-American industrialist and chemist
- Harald Quandt (1921–1967), industrialist
- Hasso Plattner (born 1944), co-founder of SAP SE software company
- Emil Rathenau (1838–1915), industrialist and founder of the AEG
- Wolf Jobst Siedler (1926–2013), publisher and publicist
- Arnold von Siemens (1853–1918), entrepreneur and industrialist
- Carl Friedrich von Siemens (1872–1941), industrialist
- Georg Wilhelm von Siemens (1855–1919), industrialist
- Georg Solmssen (1869–1957), banker
- Joachim Heinrich Wilhelm Wagener (1782–1861), banker and patron of the arts

== Military personnel ==
=== Military officers ===
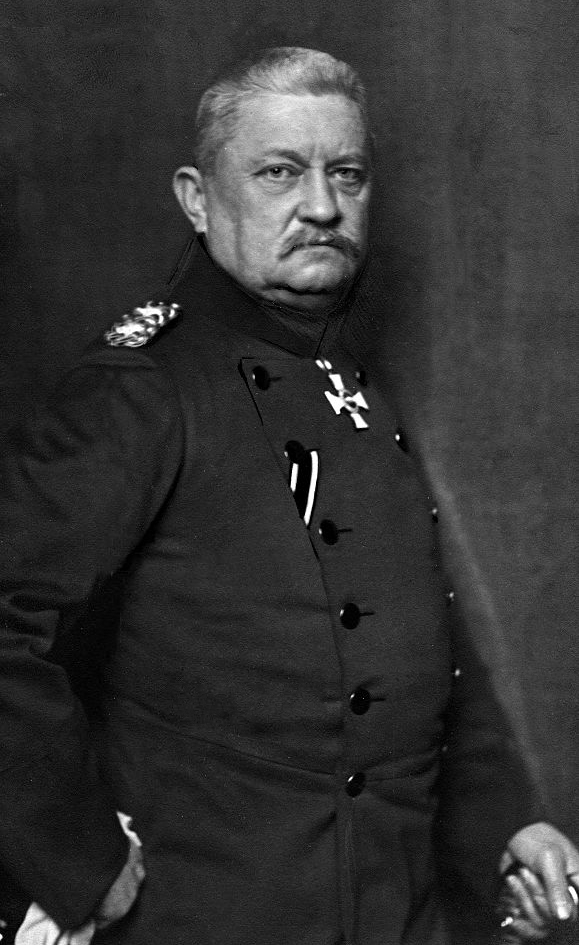
Karl von Bülow, ca.1915

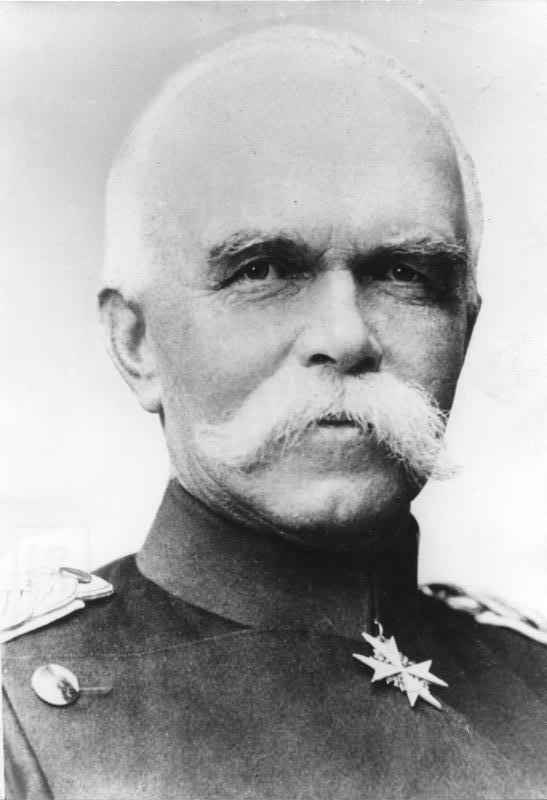
Leo Graf von Caprivi, 1880

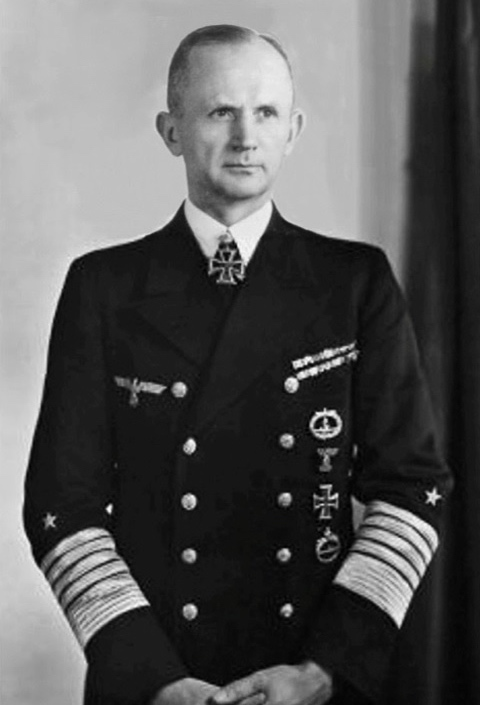
Karl Dönitz, 1943

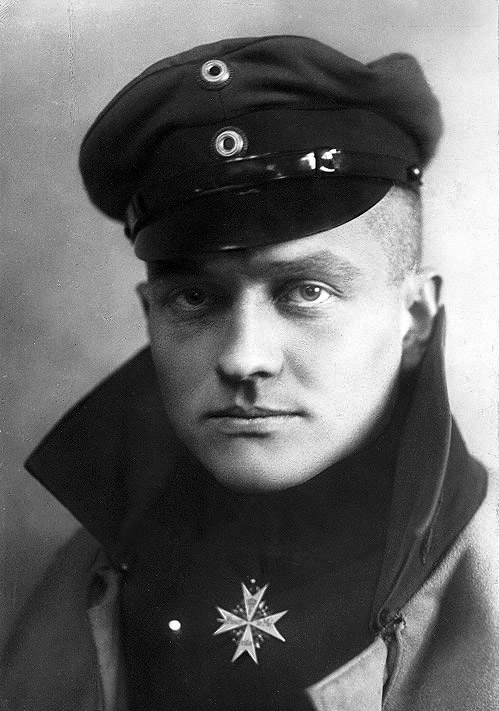
Manfred von Richthofen, 1917

- Hans-Rudolf Boehmer (born 1938), vice admiral A.D. the German Navy, inspector of the navy (1995–1998)
- Karl von Bülow (1846–1921), Prussian field marshal
- Heinz Brandt (1907–1944), General Staff officer
- Adolf von Brauchitsch (1876–1935), German major general
- Walther von Brauchitsch (1881–1948), German field marshal
- Leo von Caprivi (1831–1899), vice admiral of the Imperial German Navy, politicians, Chancellor as a successor Bismarck
- Karl Dönitz (1891–1980), grand admiral and commander of the German Navy in WWII
- Maximilian von Edelsheim (1897–1994), general
- Max von Fabeck (1854–1916), Prussian general
- Maximilian Vogel von Falckenstein (1839–1917), Prussian general
- Friedrich Wilhelm Quirin von Forcade de Biaix (1699–1765), Prussian general
- Georg Freiherr von Gayl (1850–1927), Prussian general
- Ludwig Friedrich Leopold von Gerlach (1790–1861), Prussian general
- Karl von Grolman (1777–1843), Prussian general
- Friedrich Wilhelm von Grumbkow (1678–1739), Prussian field marshal
- Wilhelm von Hahnke (1833–1912), Prussian field marshal
- Henning von Holtzendorff (1853–1919), German admiral
- Ludwig Karl von Kalckstein (1725–1800), Prussian field marshal
- Otto von Knobelsdorff (1886–1966), German general
- Christian Nicolaus von Linger (1669–1755), Prussian general
- Ludwig Adolf Wilhelm von Lützow (1782–1834), Prussian lieutenant general
- Erich von Manstein (1887–1973), German field marshal
- Alexander von Monts (1832–1888), Prussian and German Imperial Navy officer
- Elhard von Morozowicz (1893–1934), Der Stahlhelm official and SA General
- Friedrich Graf Kleist von Nollendorf (1762–1823), Prussian field marshal
- Jürgen Oesten (1913–2010), German Korvettenkapitän in the Kriegsmarine
- Hermann von Oppeln-Bronikowski (1899–1966), German general
- Alexander August Wilhelm von Pape (1813–1895), Prussian field marshal
- Augustus Ferdinand of Prussia (1730–1813), Prussian general
- Adalbert of Prussia (1811–1873), Prussian admiral
- Albert of Prussia (1837–1906), Prussian general field marshal
- Friedrich Karl of Prussia (1828–1873), Prussian field marshal
- Henry of Prussia (1726–1802), 13 child king Frederick William. I in Prussia, the Prussian commander army
- Albert von Rauch (1829–1901), Prussian general
- Fedor von Rauch (1822–1892), cavalry officer in the Prussian Army
- Friedrich von Rauch (1855–1935), Prussian general
- Gustav Waldemar von Rauch (1819–1890), Prussian general
- Nikolaus von Rauch (1851–1904), Prussian colonel
- Wilhelm Radziwiłł (1797–1870), Prussian general
- Klaus Reinhardt (1941–2021), German general
- August Otto Rühle von Lilienstern (1780–1848), Prussian lieutenant general
- Sigismund von Schlichting (1829–1909), Prussian general
- Alfred von Schlieffen (1833–1913), Prussian field marshal
- Samuel von Schmettau (1682–1751), Prussian field marshal
- Rudolf Schmidt (1886–1957), German general
- Friedrich von Sohr (1775–1845), Prussian colonel
- Christoph Ludwig von Stille (1696–1752), Prussian general
- Günther Tamaschke (1896–1959), Nazi SS concentration camp commandant
- Detlof von Winterfeldt (1867–1940), German officer and military attaché
- Carl Friedrich Heinrich, Graf von Wylich und Lottum (1767–1841), Prussian general

== Scientists ==
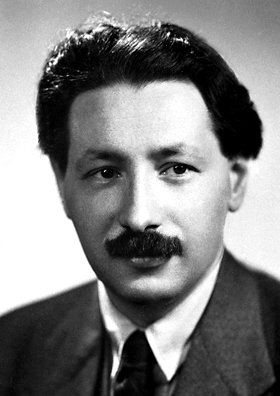
Ernst Chain

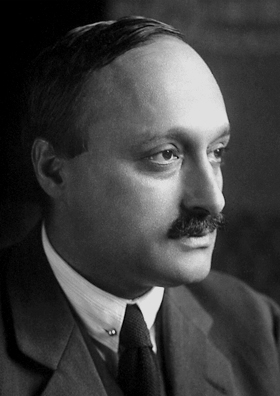
James Franck

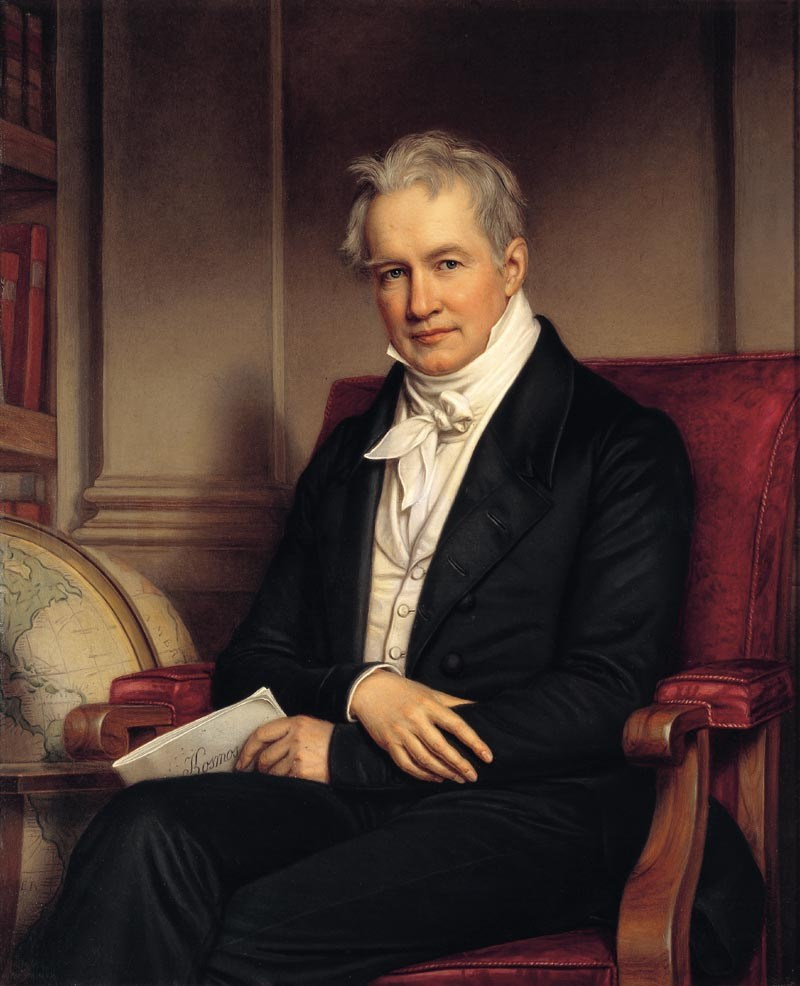
Alexander von Humboldt, 1843

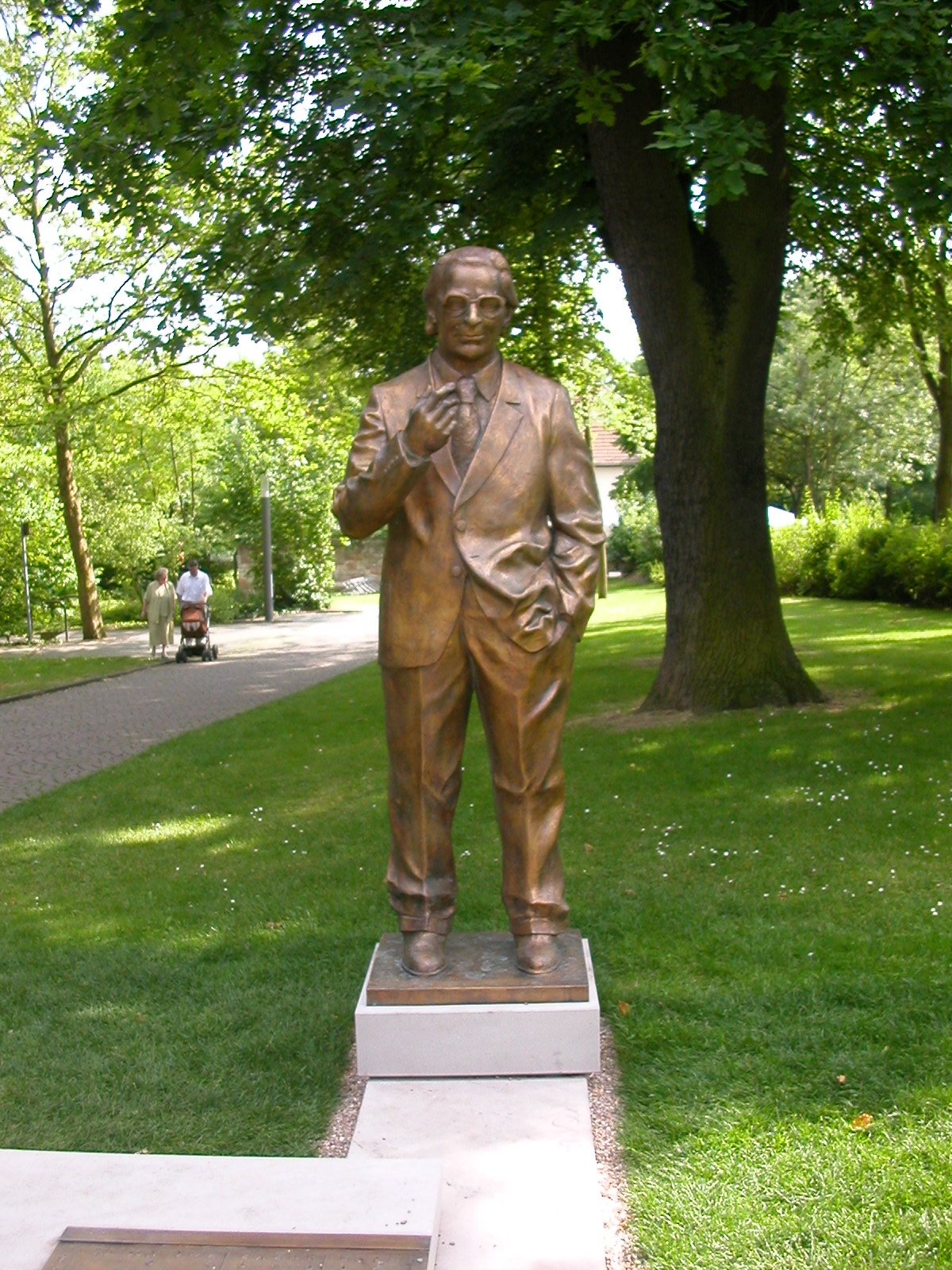
Statue of Konrad Zuse in Bad Hersfeld

- Otto Wilhelm Hermann von Abich (1806–1886), mineralogist and geologist
- Franz Karl Achard (1753–1821), chemist, geoscientist, physicist and biologist
- Michael Albeck (born 1934), Israeli chemist; president of Bar-Ilan University
- Friedrich Eduard Beneke (1798 – ca.1854), psychologist and philosopher
- Emil du Bois-Reymond (1818–1896), physiologist and public intellectual
- Ernst Chain (1906–1979), German-born British biochemist, shared the 1945 Nobel Prize in Physiology or Medicine
- Max Delbrück (1906–1981), biophysicist
- Paul Erman (1764–1851), a Huguenot physicist
- James Franck (1882 –1964), German–American physicist who shared the 1925 Nobel Prize in Physics
- Paula Hertwig (1889–1983), biologist and professor
- Hermann von Helmholtz (1821–1894), philosopher, physiologist and physicist
- Ingrid van Houten-Groeneveld (1921–2015), Dutch astronomer
- Alexander von Humboldt (1769–1859), geographer, naturalist, explorer, and influential proponent of Romantic philosophy and science
- Julius Klaproth (1783–1835), orientalist, explorer, historian and ethnographer
- Edmund Landau (1877–1938), mathematician
- Paul Langerhans (1847–1888), pathologist, physiologist, and biologist
- Johann Nathanael Lieberkühn (1711–1756), physician
- Andreas Sigismund Marggraf (1709–1782), chemist
- Bernhard Hermann Neumann (1909–2002), German-born British-Australian mathematician
- Peter Simon Pallas (1741–1811), naturalist, botanist and zoologist
- Rabea Rogge, electrical engineer, robotic researcher, polar scientist and private astronaut
- Wolf-Dieter Schneider (1942–2025), metallurgist and university professor
- Alfred Wegener (1880–1930), polar researcher, geophysicist and meteorologist
- Max Wertheimer (1880–1943), psychologist, one of the three founders of Gestalt psychology
- Adolf Windaus (1876–1959), chemist who won a Nobel Prize in Chemistry in 1928
- Carl Gustav Witt (1866–1946), astronomer and discover of two asteroids
- Konrad Zuse (1910–1995), civil engineer, inventor and computer pioneer

== Judges and lawyers ==
- Heinz Drossel (1916–2008), judge, honored as Righteous Among the Nations
- Eduard Gans (1797–1839), jurist
- Rudolf von Gneist (1816–1895), jurist and politician
- Wilhelm Heinrich von Grolman (1781–1856), lawyer, Berlin Court of Appeal president (the "righteous judge")
- Jutta Limbach (1934–2016), president of the Federal Constitutional Court of Germany 1994–2002, as the first woman in this office
- Fritz Oppenheimer (1898–1968), German-American lawyer
- Hans-Jürgen Papier (born 1943), president of the Federal Constitutional Court 2002–2010

== Theologians ==
- Kurt Aland (1915–1994), theologian
- Albrecht of Brandenburg (1490–1545), archbishop of Magdeburg and Elector of Mainz, Lord Chancellor of Holy Roman Empire of the German Nation
- Otto Dibelius (1880–1967), leading member of the Confessing Church, bishop of Berlin, Chairman of the Council of Evangelical Church, president of Ecumenical Council
- Regina Jonas (1902–1944), first woman in history to be ordained as a rabbi

== Writers (including historians, journalists), scholars and philosophers ==
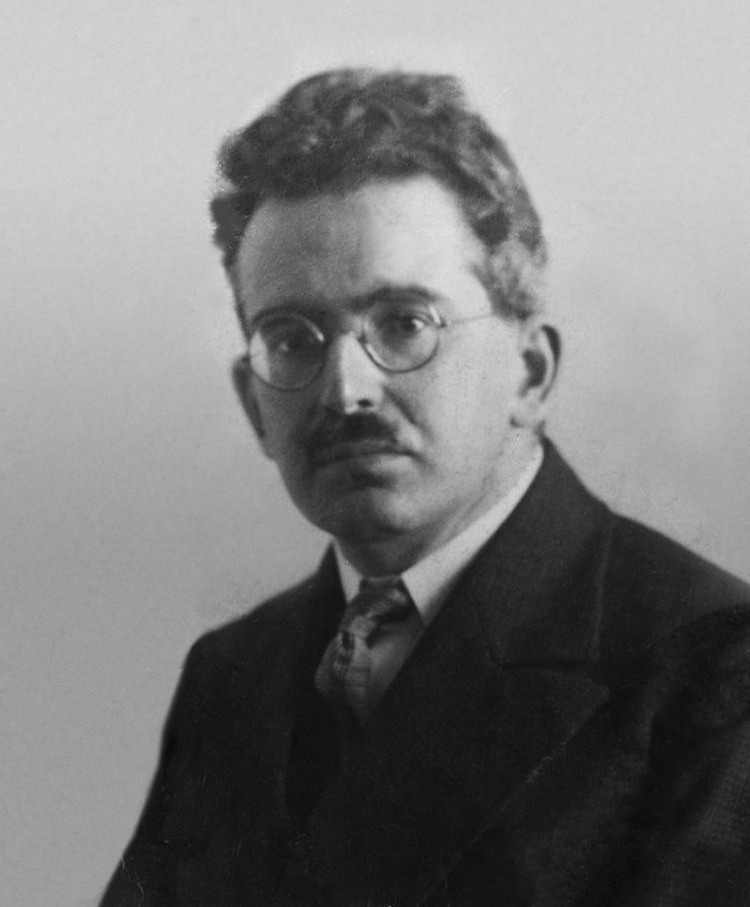
Walter Benjamin, 1928

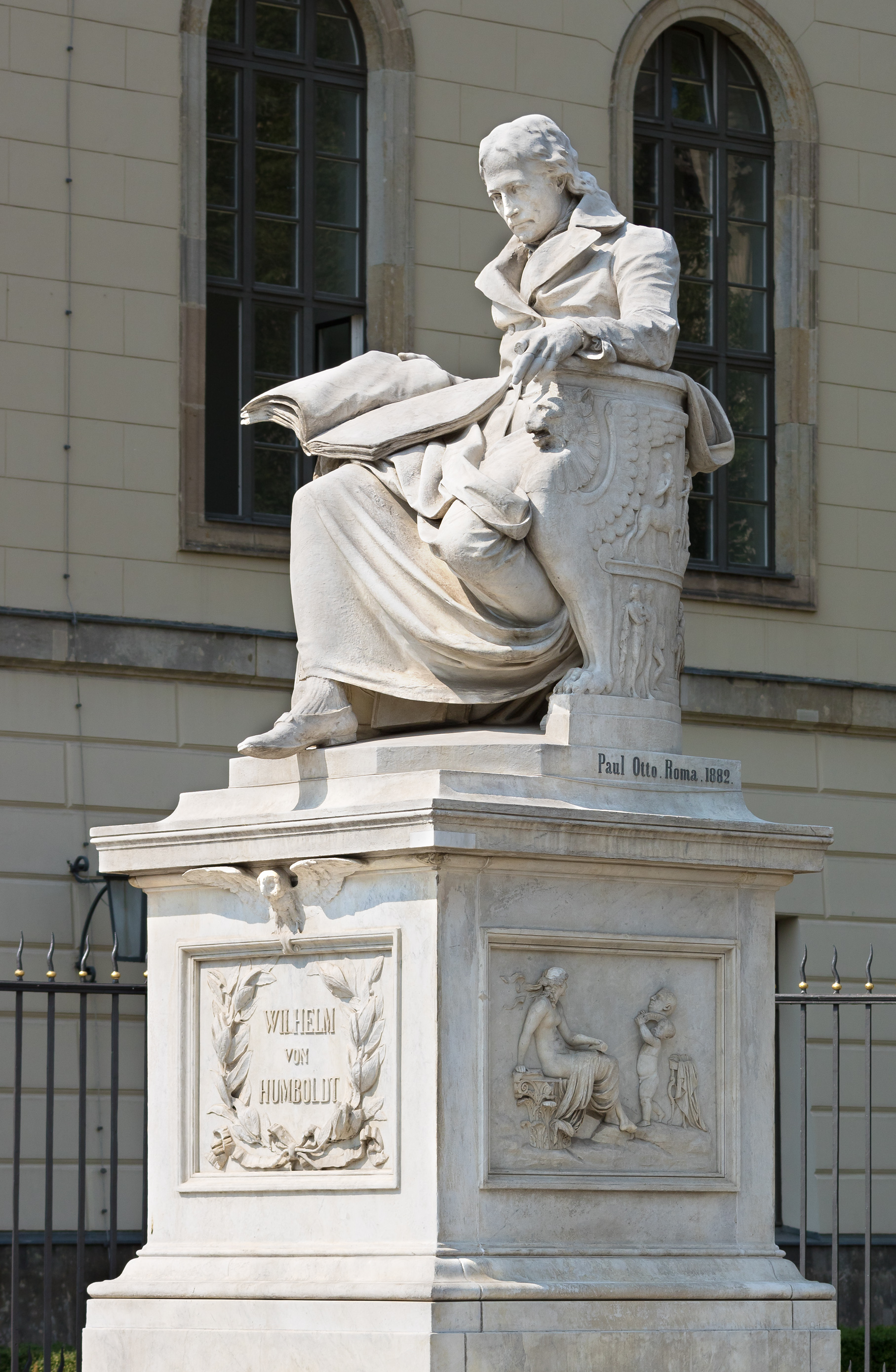
Statue of Wilhelm von Humboldt, Humboldt University, Berlin

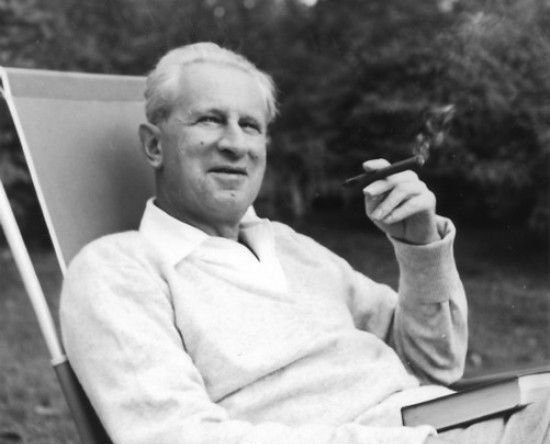
Herbert Marcuse, 1955

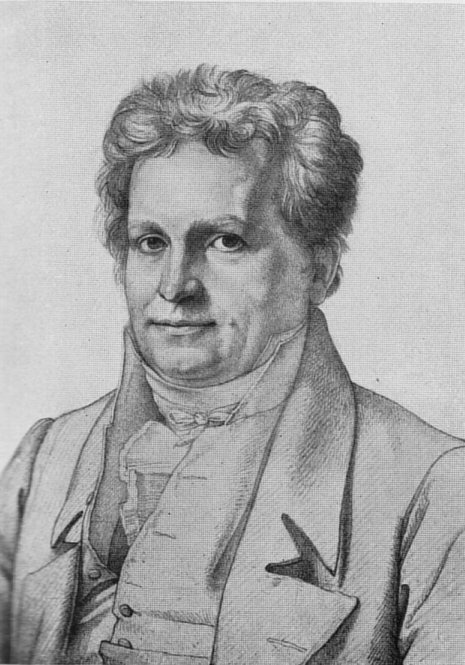
Portrait of Ludwig Tieck

- Ruth Andreas-Friedrich (1901–1977), author and journalist
- Achim von Arnim (1781–1831), poet and novelist
- Gisela von Arnim (1827–1889), writer
- Bernd-Rainer Barth (born 1957), historian and publicist
- Alexander Gottlieb Baumgarten (1714–1762), philosopher
- Heinrich Becker (1770–1822), actor
- Walter Benjamin (1892–1940), philosopher
- Ludwig Borchardt (1863–1938), Egyptologist
- Adolf Brand (1874–1945), writer
- Gottfried Gabriel Bredow (1773–1814), historian
- Heinrich Brugsch (1827–1894), Egyptologist
- Friedrich von Canitz (1654–1699), poet and diplomat
- Hoimar von Ditfurth (1921–1989), physician and journalist
- Alfred Döblin (1878–1957), novelist, essayist, and doctor
- Georg Ebers (1837–1898), Egyptologist
- Ernst Ehrlich (1921–2007), German-Swiss Judaic scholar and historian
- Joachim Fest (1926–2006), historian and journalist
- Henry Friedlander (1930–2012), Holocaust survivor and historian of the Holocaust
- Paul Friedlander (1882–1968), philologist and writer
- Kurt Großmann (1897–1972), journalist
- Hans Gustav Güterbock (1908–2000), Hittitologist
- Hans von Hentig (1887–1974), criminologist
- Kurt Hiller (1885–1972), journalist and essayist
- Gerald Holton (born 1922), science historian and physicist
- Wilhelm von Humboldt (1767–1835), philosopher, linguist, government functionary, diplomat, and founder of the Humboldt University of Berlin
- Maybrit Illner (born 1965), journalist
- Robert Jungk (1913–1994), journalist and futurist
- Manuela Kay (born 1964), journalist
- Yvonne-Ruth Killmer (1921–2014), journalist
- Klemens von Klemperer (1916–2012), historian
- Luise Kraushaar (1905–1989), historian
- Bernhard von Kugler (1837–1898), historian
- Günther von Lojewski (1935–2023), journalist
- Wolf von Lojewski (born 1937), journalist
- Richard Löwenthal (1908–1991), journalist
- Herbert Marcuse (1898–1979), German-American philosopher, political scientist and sociologist
- Erich Maschke (1900–1982), historian and professor of history
- Carolina Michaëlis (1851–1925), a German-Portuguese romanist
- Hildegard Maria Nickel (born 1948), sociologist specializing in gender studies
- Franz Oppenheimer (1864–1943), sociologist and economist
- Erwin Panofsky (1892–1968), art historian
- Iris Radisch (born 1959), journalist
- Peter Rüchel (1937–2019), music journalist
- Hajo Seppelt (born 1963), journalist
- Georg Simmel (1858–1918), sociologist and philosopher
- Gabor Steingart (born 1962), journalist
- Ludwig Tieck (1773–1853), poet, translator, editor, and novelist
- Kurt Tucholsky (1890–1935), journalist
- Rahel Varnhagen (1771–1833), writer and salon host
- Theodor Wolff (1868–1943), journalist

== Actors, visual artists (including architects), comedians, directors and musicians ==
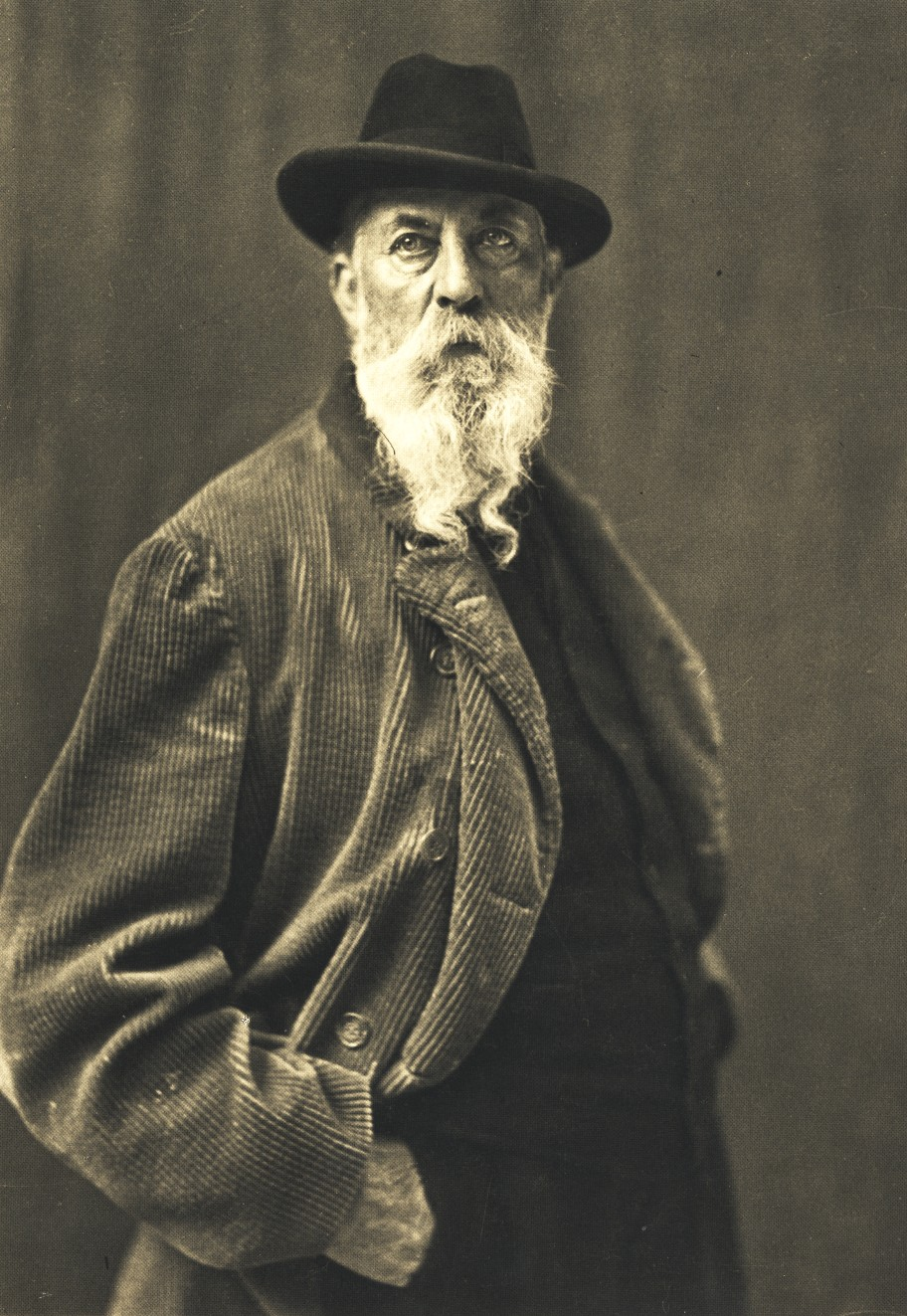
Portrait of Reinhold Begas, before 1911

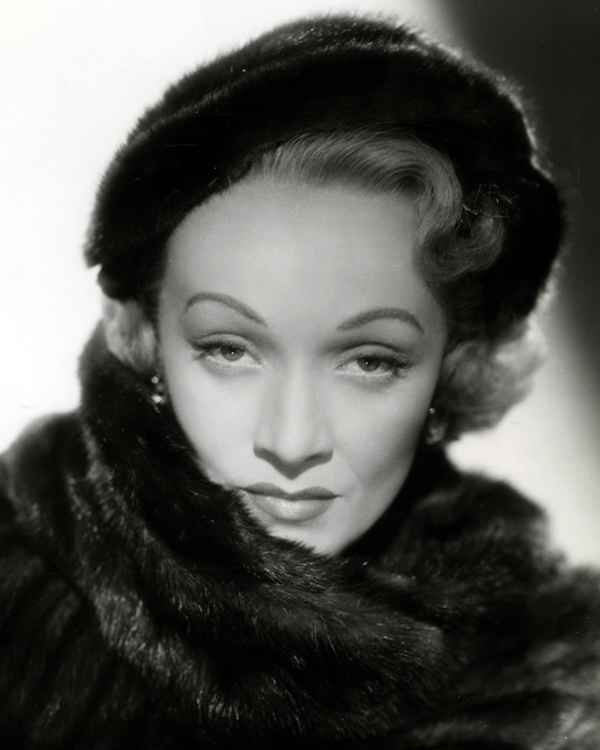
Marlene Dietrich, 1951

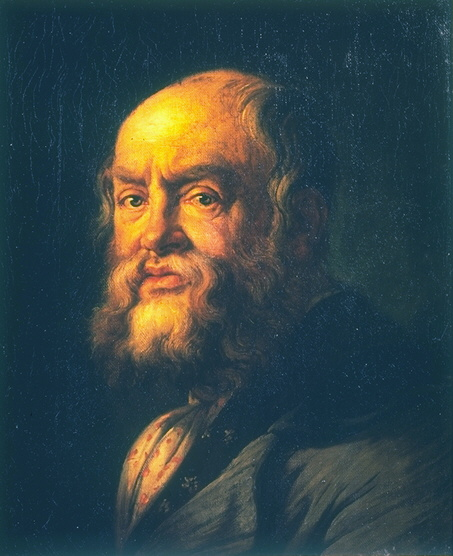
Portrait of Bonaventura Genelli, 1860

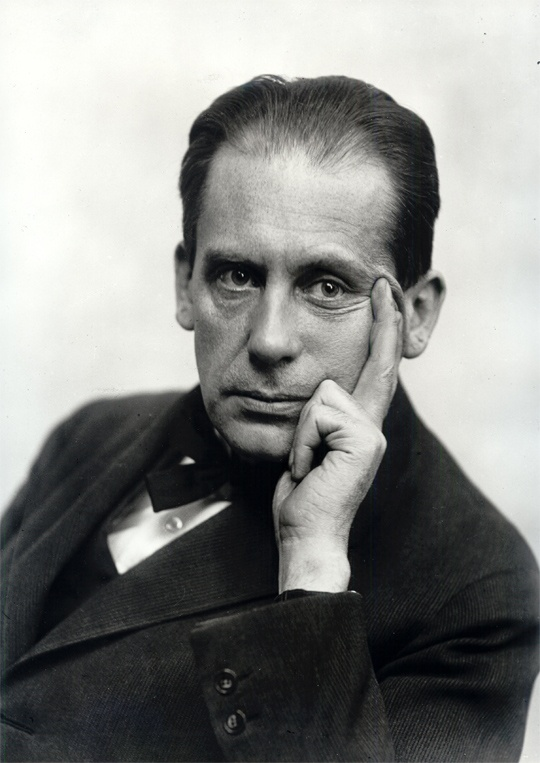
Walter Gropius, 1919

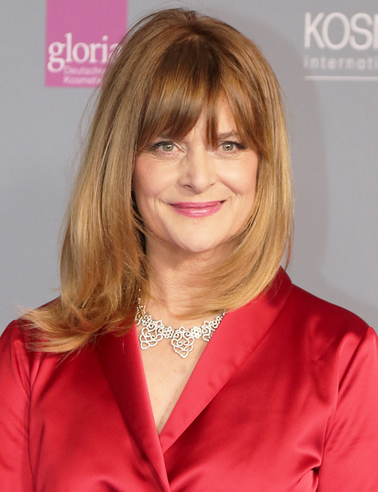
Nastassja Kinski, 2017

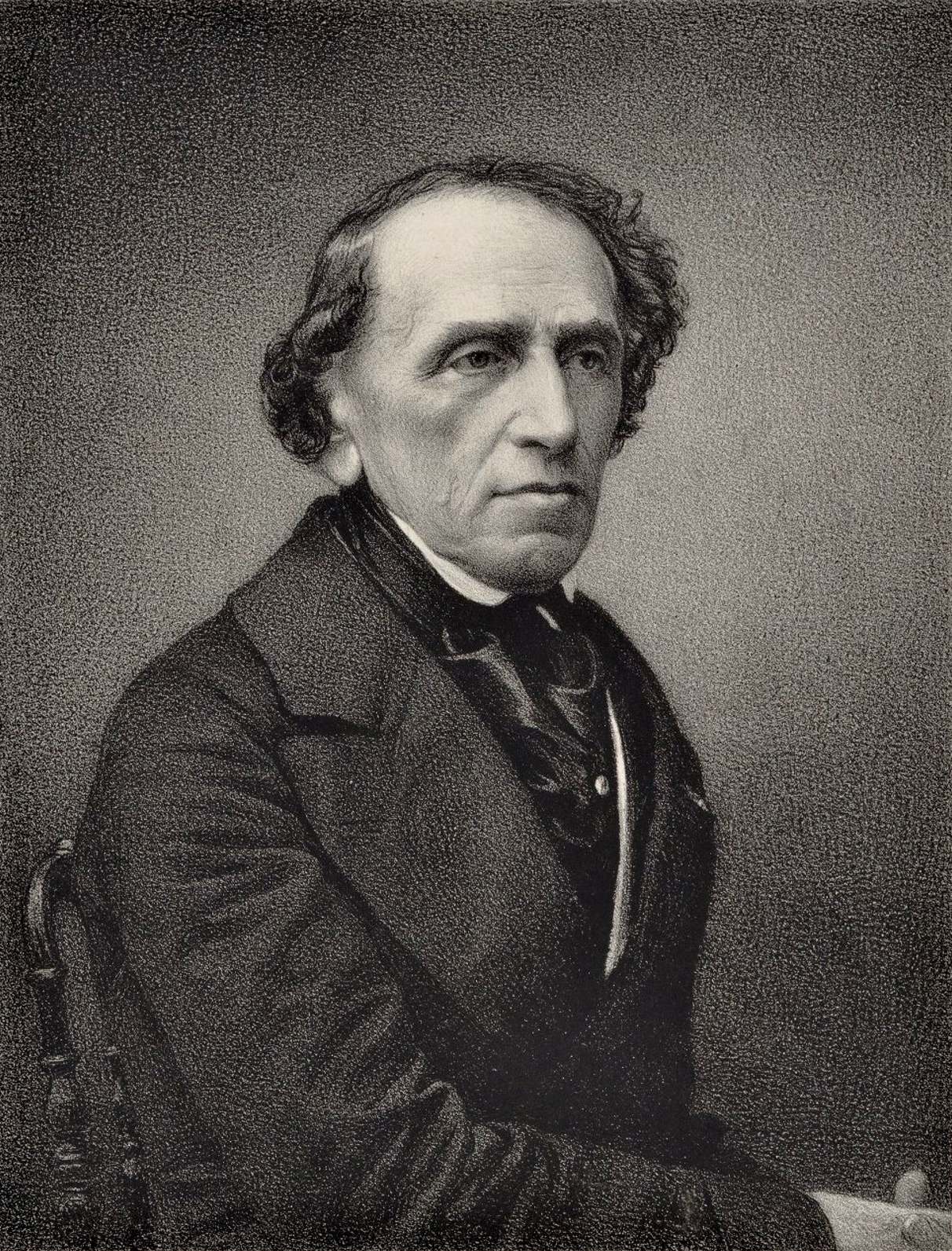
Giacomo Meyerbeer, 1865

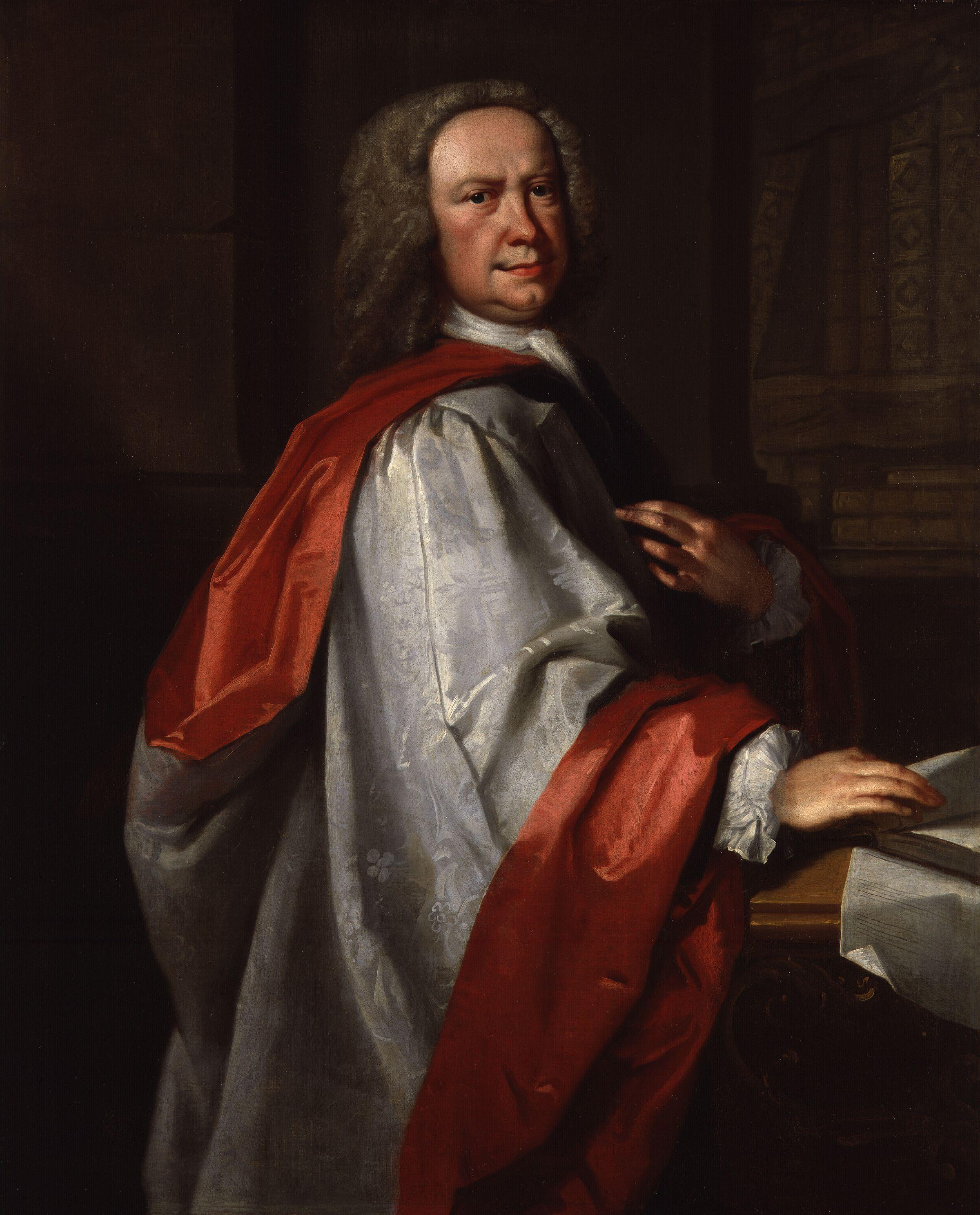
Johann Christoph Pepusch

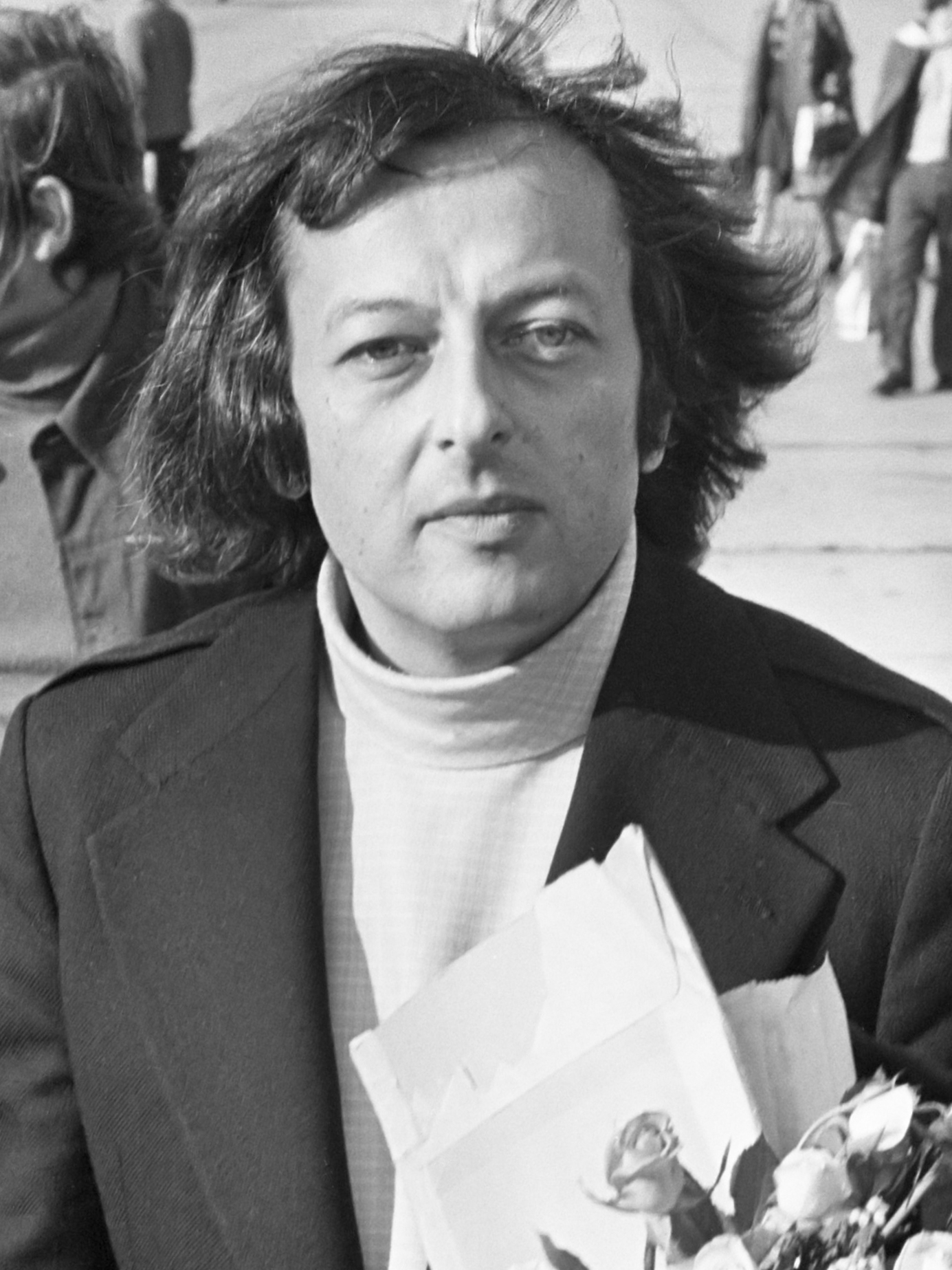
André Previn, 1973

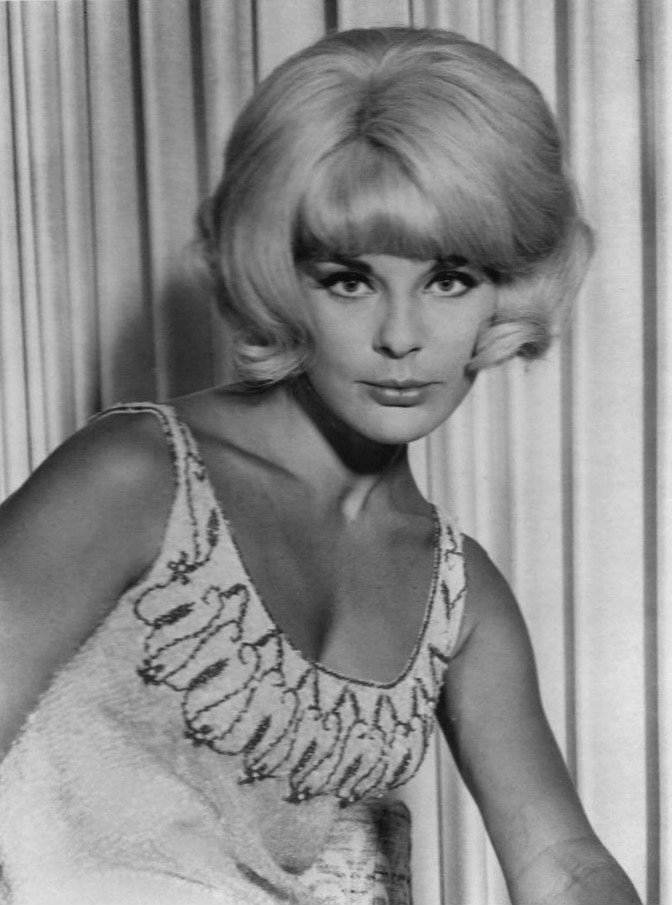
Elke Sommer, 1965

- Ken Adam (1921–2016), set designer
- Die Ärzte band members, Farin Urlaub and Bela B
- Nadja Auermann (born 1971), supermodel
- Peer Augustinski (1940–2014), actor
- Hugo Egon Balder (born 1950), actor and comedian
- Michael Ballhaus (1935–2017), cinematographer
- Mario Barth (born 1972), comedian
- Karl Becker (1820–1900), painter
- Reinhold Begas (1831–1911), sculptor
- Tim Bendzko (born 1985), singer-songwriter
- Dagmar Berghoff (born 1943), actress, radio and television presenter
- Folker Bohnet (1937–2020), actor, theatre director and playwright
- Horst Buchholz (1933–2003), actor
- Buddy, singer
- Karl August Devrient (1797–1872), stage actor
- Ludwig Devrient (1784–1832), actor
- Marlene Dietrich (1901–1992), singer and actress
- Christoph von Dohnányi (born 1929), conductor
- Klaus Doldinger (born 1936), saxophonist
- Angelica Domröse (born 1941), actress
- Caroline Fischer (born 1984), pianist
- Dietrich Fischer-Dieskau (1925–2012)
- Elton (born 1971), comedian and television presenter
- Alexander Fehling (born 1981), actor
- Hansjörg Felmy (1931–2007), actor
- Julia Franck (born 1970), writer
- Naomi Frankel (1918–2009), novelist
- Peter Frankenfeld (1913–1979), comedian, radio and television personality
- Gisèle Freund (1908–2000) German-born French photographer and photojournalist
- Liv Lisa Fries (born 1990), actress
- Tatjana Gamerith (1919–2021), painter and graphic artist
- Claus Theo Gärtner (born 1943), actor
- Bonaventura Genelli (1798–1868), painter
- Götz George (1938–2016), actor
- Kurt Gerron (1897–1944), actor
- Valeska Gert (1892–1978), dancer and cabaret artist
- Walter Gronostay (1906–1937), composer
- Walter Gropius (1883–1961), architect
- Georg Grosz (1893–1959), painter
- Nina Hagen (born 1955), singer
- Karoline Herfurth (born 1984), actress
- Judith Hermann (born 1970), writer
- Paul Heyse (1830–1914), novelist, dramatist and poet
- Martina Hill (born 1974), actress
- Margot Hielscher (1919–2017), actress
- Alfred Hirschmeier (1931–1996), film production designer
- Marta Husemann (1913–1960), actress, communist and resistance fighter
- Harald Juhnke (1929–2005), actor, singer, comedian and entertainer
- Roland Kaiser (born 1952), singer
- Nastassja Kinski (born 1961), actress
- Otto Klemperer (1885–1973), composer and conductor
- Johanna von Koczian (1933–2024), actress
- Wolfgang Kohlhaase (1931–2022), screenwriter and film director
- Hildegard Knef (1925–2002), singer and actress
- Asuman Krause (born 1976), German-Turkish singer, model and television personality
- Hardy Krüger (1928–2022), actor
- Fritz Kühn (1910–1967), visual artist
- Peer Kusmagk (born 1975), actor
- Maria Landrock (1923–1992), actress
- Lotte Lenya (born Karoline Wilhelmine Charlotte Blamauer; 1898–1981), Austrian-American singer, diseuse, and actress
- Kevyn Lettau (born 1959), singer jazz
- Max Liebermann (1847–1935), painter
- Paul Lincke (1866–1946), composer and theatre conductor
- Albert Lortzing (1801–1851), composer, librettist, actor and singer
- Ernst Lubitsch (1892–1947), German-American film director, producer, writer, and actor
- Florian Lukas (born 1973), actor
- Markus Majowski (born 1964), actor and comedian
- Giacomo Meyerbeer (1791–1864), opera composer
- Inge Meysel (1910–2004), actress
- Antonie Mielke (1856–1907), operatic soprano
- Helmut Newton (born Helmut Neustädter) (1920–2004), photographer
- Désirée Nick (born 1956), actress and writer
- Erik Ode (1910–1983), actor and film director
- Gerd Oswald (1919–1989), film director
- Kerstin Ott (born 1982), singer
- Johann Christoph Pepusch (1667–1752), composer, lived in England
- Oliver Petszokat (born 1978), singer
- Günter Pfitzmann (1924–2003), actor
- Hans Poelzig (1864–1936), architect
- André Previn (1929–2019), pianist, conductor and composer
- Jürgen Prochnow (born 1941), actor
- Rammstein band members Paul Landers, bassist Oliver Riedel, drummer and keyboardist Christian Lorenz
- Ivan Rebroff (1931–2008), singer
- Leni Riefenstahl (1902–2003), photographer, film director, producer, screenwriter and editor
- Marianne Rosenberg (born 1955), singer
- Hans Rosenthal (1925–1987), radio editor, director, and radio and television host
- Erna Sack (1898–1972), soprano singer
- Tom Schilling (born 1982), actor
- Wilhelm Schirmer (1802–1866), painter.
- Cornelia Schleime (born 1953), painter, performer, filmmaker and writer
- Jörn Schlönvoigt (born 1986), actor and singer
- Christoph Schneider (born 1966), musician of Band Rammstein
- Louis Schneider (1805–1878), actor and writer
- Klaus Schulze (1947–2022), electronic music pioneer, composer and musician
- Tomer Sisley (born 1974), Israeli humorist, actor, screenwriter, comedian, and film director
- Max Skladanowsky (1863–1939), early filmmaker and co-inventor of Bioscop
- Elke Sommer (born 1940), actor
- Detlef Soost (born 1970), dancer, choreographer and television presenter
- Ingrid Steeger (1947–2023), actress and comedian
- Carl Steffeck (1818–1890), painter
- Hermann Struck (1876–1944), painter
- Katrin Lea Tag (born 1972), scenic designer and costume designer
- Katharina Thalbach (born 1954), actress
- Christian Thielemann (born 1959), conductor
- Sophia Thomalla (born 1989), actress
- Nora Tschirner (born 1981), actress
- Kurt Tucholsky (1890–1935), writer
- Michael Verhoeven (1938–2024), actor
- Otto Wallburg (1889–1944), actor
- Volker Wangenheim (1928–2014), conductor, composer and academic teacher
- Jonathan Elias Weiske (born 1996), film and television actor, and voice actor
- Wilhelmine von Wrochem (1798–1839), flutist, singer and actress
- Dana Wynter (1931–2011), actress
- Jing Xiang (born 1993), actress
- Rolf Zacher (1941–2018), actor

== Sportspeople ==
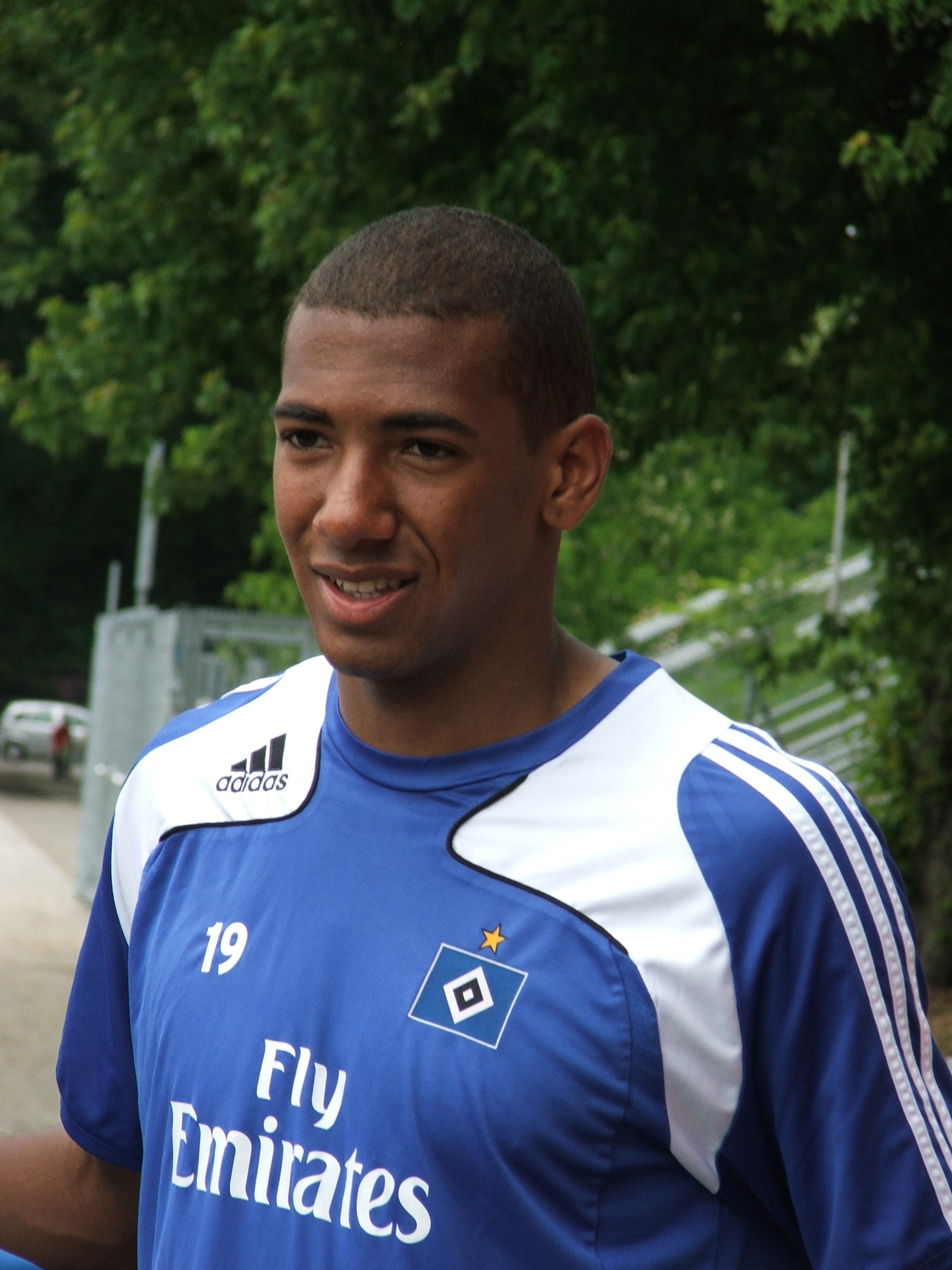
Jérôme Boateng, 2009

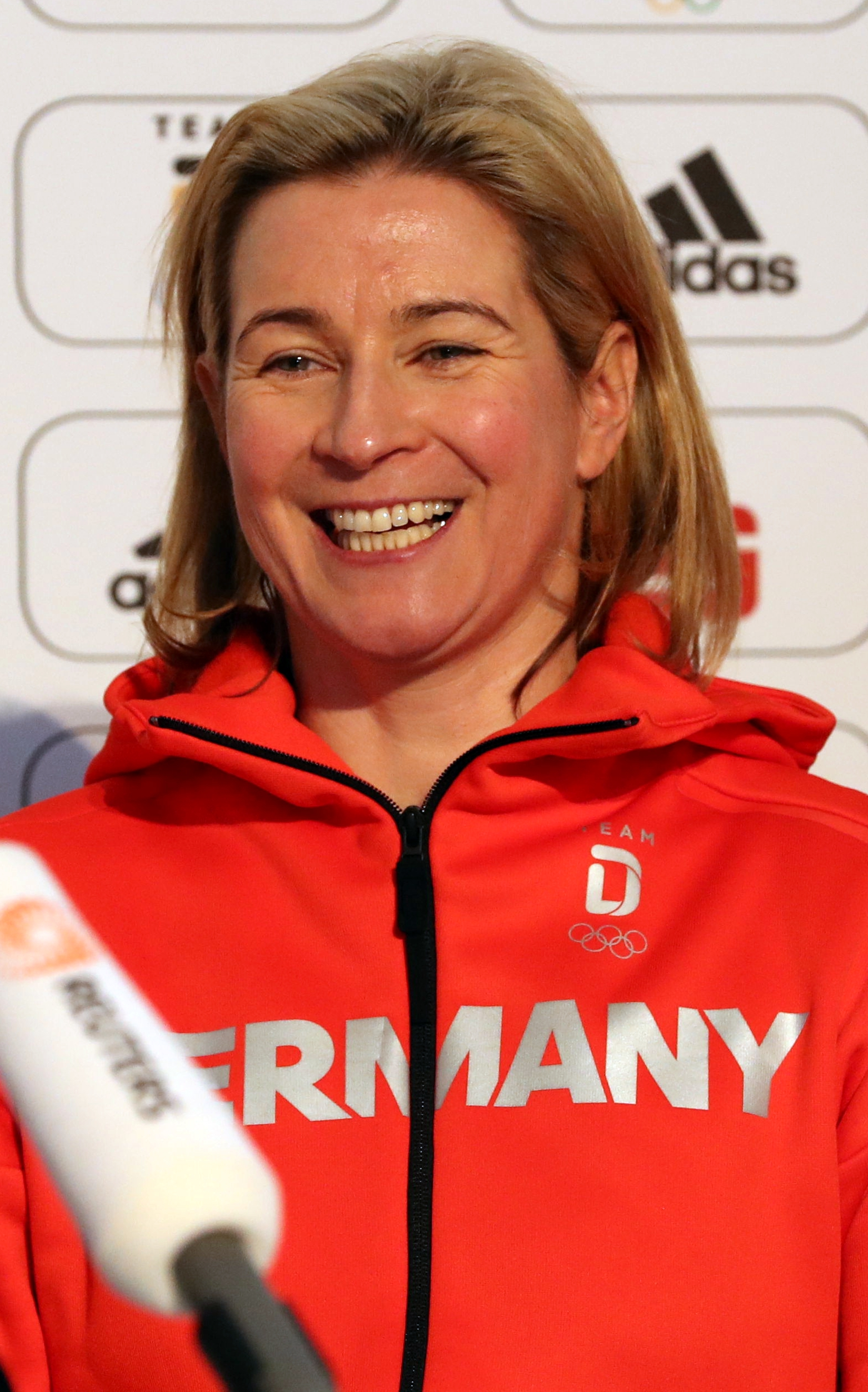
Claudia Pechstein, 2018

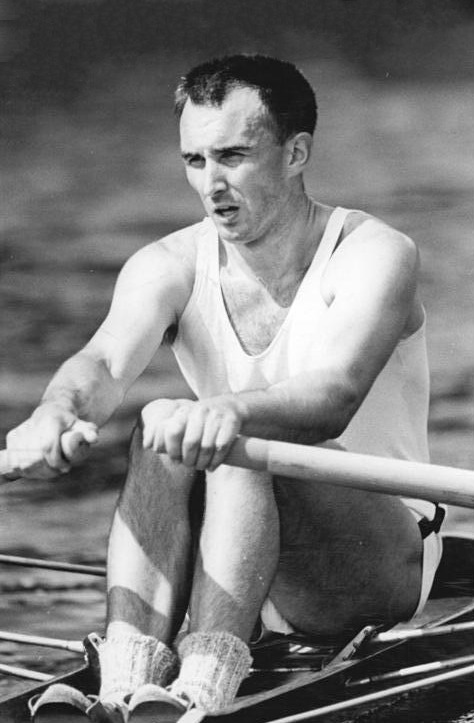
Achim Hill, 1962

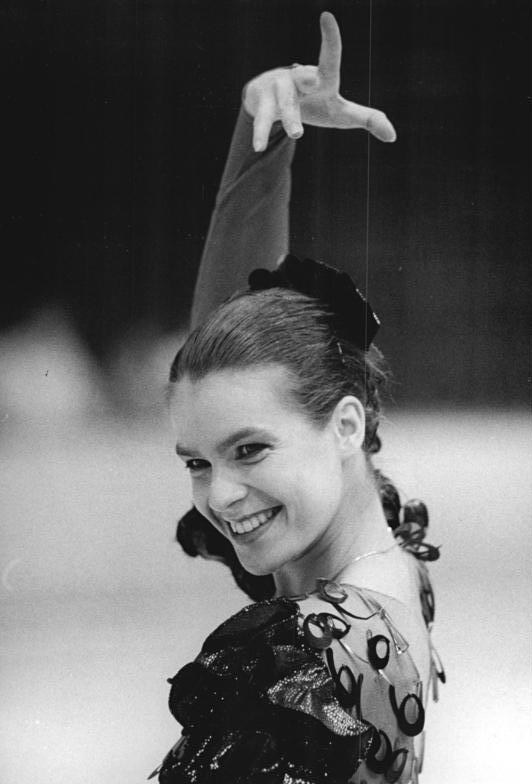
Katarina Witt, 1988

- Rudi Ball (1911–1975), Olympic and Hall of Fame ice hockey player
- Muhamed Bešić (born 1992), footballer who plays for the Bosnia and Herzegovina national football team
- Jérôme Boateng (born 1988), football player and 2014 FIFA World Cup winner
- Kevin-Prince Boateng (born 1987), footballer
- John Brooks (born 1993), footballer
- Guido Buchwald (born 1961), footballer
- Omar Bugiel (born 1994), Lebanese international footballer
- Karim Darwiche (born 1998), Lebanese international footballer
- Sven Felski (born 1974), ice hockey coach
- Gottfried Fuchs (1889–1972), German-Canadian Olympic soccer player
- Niels Giffey (born 1991), basketball player, two-time NCAA champion and 2023 FIBA World Cup winner
- Thomas Häßler (born 1966), footballer and 1990 FIFA World Cup winner
- Robert Harting (born 1984), discus thrower
- Heinz Henschel (1920–2006), German Ice Hockey Hall of Fame, and IIHF Hall of Fame inductee
- Achim Hill (1935–2015), rower
- Robert Huth (born 1984), footballer
- Gustav Jaenecke (1908–1985), Olympic ice hockey player
- Carsten Keller (born 1939), field hockey player and gold medalist at the 1972 Summer Olympics, father of Andreas Keller, Natascha Keller and Florian Keller
- Max Kepler (born 1993), baseball player for the Minnesota Twins of the MLB
- Henry Laskau (1916–2000), track and field athlete
- Pierre Littbarski (born 1960), footballer
- Laura Ludwig (born 1986), beach volleyballer
- Ingeborg Mello (1919–2009), track and field athlete
- Jonas Müller (born 1995), ice hockey player and silver medalist at the 2018 Winter Olympics
- Hassan Oumari (born 1986), footballer
- Joan Oumari (born 1988), footballer
- Claudia Pechstein (born 1972), speed skater
- Ellen Preis (Ellen Müller-Preis) (1912–2007), German-born Austrian Olympic champion foil fencer
- Daniel Prenn (1904–1991), Russian-born German, Polish, and British world-top-ten tennis player
- Nyara Sabally, WNBA player
- Otto Scheff (1889–1956), Olympic swimmer
- Gustav Scholz (1930–2000), boxer
- Jochen Schümann (born 1959), sailor and Olympic champion
- Amar Sejdić (born 1996), American soccer player for Atlanta United FC of the MLS
- Hagen Stamm (born 1960), water polo player
- Ulf Timmermann (born 1962), shot putter
- Franziska van Almsick (born 1978), swimmer and sport journalist
- Franz Wagner (born 2001), basketball player for the Orlando Magic and 2023 FIBA World Cup winner
- Moritz Wagner (born 1997), basketball player for the Orlando Magic and 2023 FIBA World Cup winner
- Katarina Witt (born 1965), figure skater and two-time Olympic champion
- Christian Ziege (born 1972), footballer

== Others ==
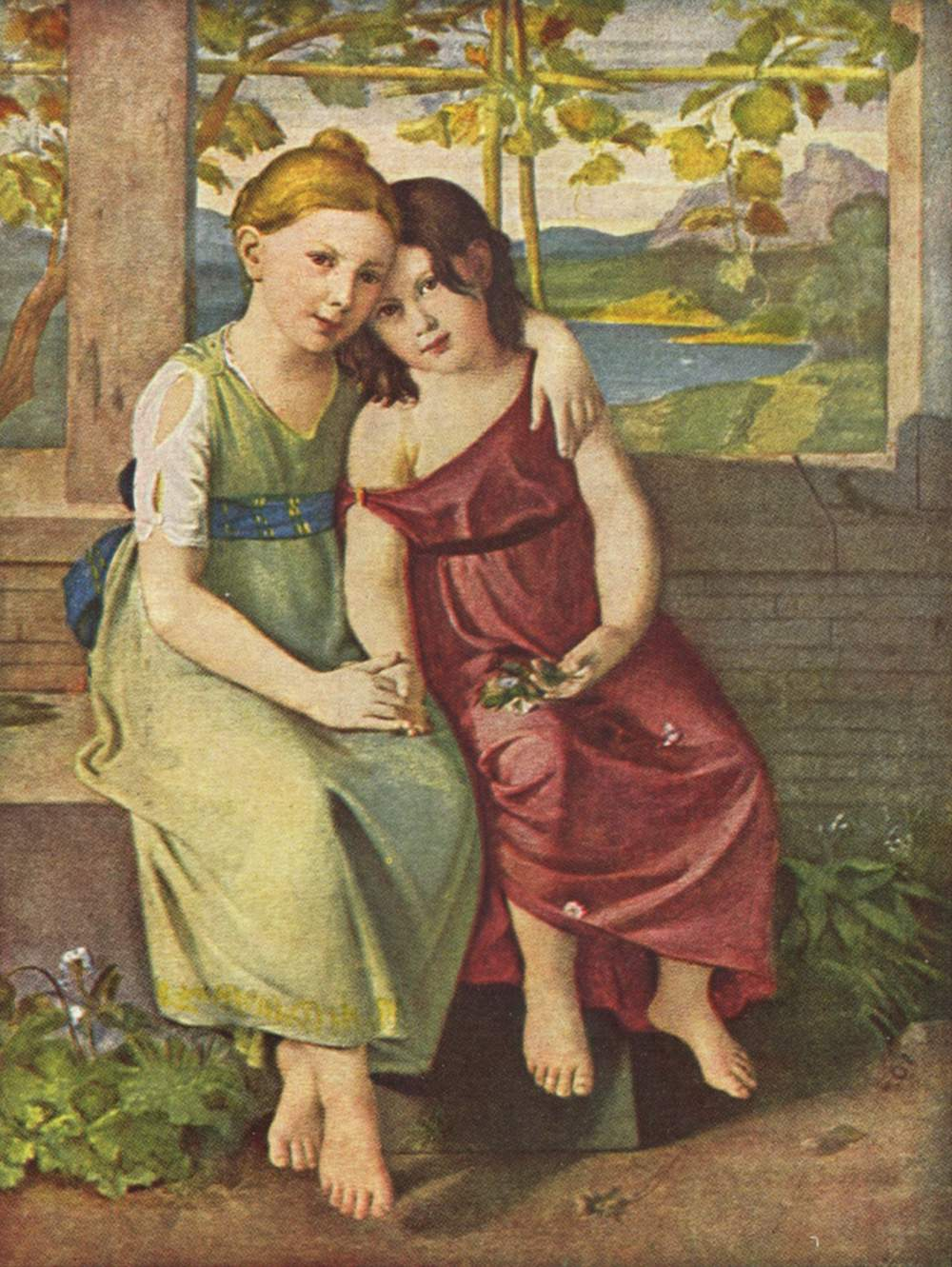
Gabriele von Bülow, aged 7 (right), and her sister Adelheid, ca. 1800

- Erna Barschak (1888–1958), teacher and psychologist
- Bärbel Bohley (1945–2010), opposition figure and artist
- Harald Braem (born 1944), writer, designer and professor
- Gabriele von Bülow (1802–1887), noblewoman
- Margot Dreschel (1908–1945), Nazi concentration camp guard executed for war crimes
- Horst Fischer (1912–1966), SS concentration camp doctor executed for war crimes
- Heinz Kapelle (1913–1941), communist and resistance fighter
- Elisabeth Lupka (1902–1949), Nazi concentration camp guard executed for war crimes
- Lars Mittank (born 1986), man who went missing in Varna, Bulgaria, in 2014
- Käthe Niederkirchner (1909–1944), communist and resistance fighter
- Elisa Radziwiłł (1803–1834), German-Polish noblewoman
- Rosalie von Rauch (1829–1879), German noblewoman
- Karl-Eduard von Schnitzler (1918–2001), communist propagandist

== See also ==
- Culture of Berlin
- Music in Berlin
- Sport in Berlin
- List of Germans
