= Wolf-Dieter Schneider =

Wolf-Dieter Schneider may refer to:

- Wolf-Dieter Schneider (1942–2025), German metallurgist and university professor
- Wolf-Dieter Schneider (born 1944), experimental physicist and scientific consultant
