= The First Kiss (1928 German film) =

1928 film

- Gaston Jacquet and Anny Ondra
- Directed by: Carl Lamac
- Written by: Mira Dore; Fritz Oppenheimer; Hans H. Zerlett
- Starring: Anny Ondra; Eugen Burg; Viola Garden
- Cinematography: Otto Heller
- Music by: Paul Dessau
- Production company: Hom-AG für Filmfabrikation
- Distributed by: Süd-Film
- Release date: 25 September 1928
- Country: Germany
- Languages: Silent; German intertitles

The First Kiss (German: Der erste Kuß) is a 1928 German silent comedy film directed by Carl Lamac and starring Anny Ondra, Eugen Burg and Viola Garden.

The film's art direction was by Carl Ludwig Kirmse and Heinrich Richter.

== Cast ==
- Anny Ondra as Anny Cord
- Eugen Burg as William Cord, Getreidekönig, ihr Vater
- Viola Garden as Bessie, seine Sekretärin
- Hilde Jennings as Margit, Annys Freundin
- Werner Pittschau as Walter Stolz, ein Musiker
- Gaston Jacquet as Harry Peters
- Teddy Bill as Präsident des Anny-Cord-Clubs
- Mikhail Rasumny as Ein Hoteldirektor & Harry, Peters Chauffeur
- Josef Rovenský as Kuhlmann
- Mia Pankau as Eine Soubrette, seine Freundin
- Hubert von Meyerinck as James Twist

== Bibliography ==
- Grange, William. Cultural Chronicle of the Weimar Republic. Scarecrow Press, 2008.
