= Ernst Schellenberg =

German politician (1907–1984)

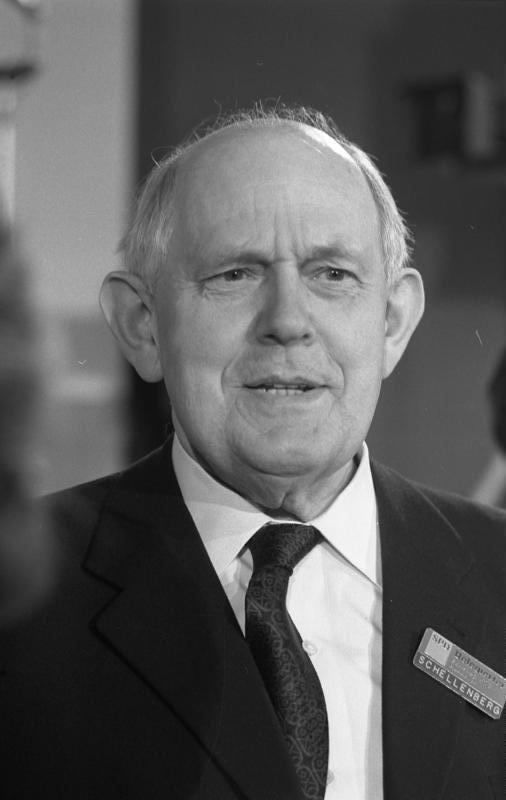
- Ernst Schellenberg (1973)

Member of the Bundestag
- In office February 1952 – 1976
- Preceded by: Otto Suhr
- Constituency: Berlin

Chair of the Bundestag Committee on Social Policy (Committee on Labour and Social Affairs from 1969)
- In office 1957–1976

Personal details
- Born: Ernst August Rudolf Schellenberg; 20 February 1907 Berlin, German Empire
- Died: 6 June 1984 (aged 77) West Berlin
- Party: Social Democratic Party (from 1948)
- Spouses: Anneliese Meyer (divorced); Annemarie Geiler (m. 1947)
- Children: 2
- Education: University of Berlin
- Occupation: Economist, social insurance administrator, politician

Ernst August Rudolf Schellenberg (20 February 1907 – 6 June 1984) was a German economist, social insurance administrator and politician of the Social Democratic Party (SPD). After the Second World War he headed the unified social insurance institution for Berlin, the Versicherungsanstalt Berlin (VAB). He was a member of the Bundestag for Berlin from 1952 to 1976 and chaired its committee on social policy from 1957 to 1976.

He was the SPD's spokesman on pensions in the debate on the 1957 pension reform and chaired the committee during the social legislation of the grand coalition and the first social–liberal coalition.

== Early life and education ==
Schellenberg was born in Berlin, the eldest of three children of Paul Schellenberg, a legal adviser, and his wife Anna, who ran a flower shop in Schöneberg. He attended the Paulsen-Realgymnasium in Steglitz from 1913 to 1922. After his parents divorced, his mother could not pay for further schooling, and he left with an intermediate certificate.

At fifteen he began an apprenticeship in social insurance at the Schmiede-Berufsgenossenschaft, the accident insurance association for the metalworking trades in Berlin. He then worked as a welfare worker and received state recognition as a Wohlfahrtspfleger in 1930.

In the mid-1920s he joined the Zentralverband der Angestellten, a union of salaried employees, and led its working group on social policy. In the last years of the Weimar Republic he did voluntary work for Rote Hilfe and was a sympathiser of the Communist Party of Germany.

From 1927 to 1929 he attended the social policy seminar of the Deutsche Hochschule für Politik. He then attended economics lectures at the University of Berlin as a guest student, and in 1931 he was admitted to regular study without the Abitur after passing a special examination. He also studied for a time in Heidelberg. In early 1933 he received a doctorate (Dr. rer. pol.) from the University of Berlin under Emil Lederer, with a dissertation on the voluntary labour service, Der freiwillige Arbeitsdienst auf Grund der bisherigen Erfahrungen.

== Nazi period ==
After the Nazis came to power, Schellenberg was briefly unemployed. In September 1933 he became a statistician with Allianz in Stuttgart. His attempt to obtain the habilitation at the University of Tübingen failed in 1936; the university cited his wife's Jewish family background and the Nuremberg Laws.

In 1938 he moved to Berlin as head of the calculation department of the national association of private insurers. From 1940 he also taught at the Hochschulinstitut für Versicherungswissenschaft of the University of Berlin, and after 1942 he acted for a time as deputy to its director, Theodor Süss. The education ministry refused on political grounds to extend his teaching. In 1944 he was released from military service after a few months as a recruit, having been found unfit.

== Social insurance in post-war Berlin ==
In May 1945 Ottomar Geschke, head of the social welfare department of Berlin's new Magistrat, appointed Schellenberg as his deputy. On 18 June 1945 Schellenberg proposed to the Magistrat that the city's fragmented insurance funds be replaced by a single institution. Ferdinand Sauerbruch, the councillor responsible for health, supported the proposal, and the Magistrat adopted it.

The Versicherungsanstalt Berlin began operating on 1 July 1945 under Schellenberg's direction. It combined health, pension and accident insurance. All employed persons were compulsorily insured, and a single contribution of 20 per cent of earnings was shared equally by employers and employees. Pension payments, suspended at the capitulation, resumed in August 1945 and were initially limited to 35 Reichsmarks a month. In January 1947 the Soviet Military Administration extended the Berlin model to the provinces of the Soviet occupation zone.

Schellenberg left the Magistrat in 1946. From the winter semester of 1946/47 he lectured on social insurance and social policy at the University of Berlin, later the Humboldt University, and in 1947 he was appointed extraordinary professor and director of its Institute for Social Policy and Insurance.

The SED-dominated Magistrat planned to change how the VAB's self-governing bodies were appointed. In February 1949 Schellenberg moved the VAB's headquarters from Mitte to Wilmersdorf in the western sector, and the institution split into eastern and western bodies. In May 1949 the Humboldt University announced that he was no longer a member of its teaching staff.

After West Berlin adopted federal legislation, the unified insurance was divided into separate branches in the early 1950s. Schellenberg headed the western institution's successor, the Krankenversicherungsanstalt Berlin, and became the first director of the AOK Berlin, the city's general local health insurance fund. He held these posts until 1958.

== Political career ==
Schellenberg joined the SPD in 1948.

=== Member of the Bundestag ===
In February 1952 Otto Suhr resigned his Bundestag seat, and the Abgeordnetenhaus of Berlin elected Schellenberg as his successor. He represented Berlin in the Bundestag until 1976.

From 1952 he worked with Ludwig Preller and Walter Auerbach on the SPD's Sozialplan für Deutschland, a programme for reorganising the social security system. He held constituency surgeries in Spandau and Kreuzberg.

=== Pension reform of 1957 ===
In January 1956 he gave the main address on the SPD's position on social reform at a party congress in Cologne. On 18 April 1956 he introduced the SPD's bill on pension reform; Labour Minister Anton Storch presented the government's outline the following day. The SPD bill proposed a pension of 75 per cent of previous gross earnings and a single pension law for manual workers and salaried employees.

The positions of the government and the opposition converged during the committee stage and through amendments in the plenary. The final debate in January 1957 was called the "Rentenschlacht" (pension battle) in the press. Schellenberg spoke 57 times during the readings and made 64 interjections; his most frequent opponent was Margot Kalinke of the German Party.

The Bundestag passed the reform on 21 January 1957 with the votes of the governing parties and the SPD, against those of the FDP. The reform linked pensions to wage growth and moved the system to pay-as-you-go financing; pensions rose by about 60 per cent on average. In the third reading Schellenberg claimed the idea of the wage-indexed pension for the SPD.

=== Chair of the Committee on Social Policy ===
After the 1957 federal election Schellenberg became chairman of the Bundestag committee on social policy, renamed the Committee on Labour and Social Affairs in 1969. He held the chair until 1976.

In 1955 he was elected to the executive of the SPD parliamentary group. He led its working group on social policy from 1957 to 1972, was a member of the SPD party executive from 1960 to 1973, and also served as a deputy chairman of the parliamentary group.

In opposition he criticised the policies of Labour Minister Theodor Blank. In March 1961 he moved, on behalf of the SPD group, that the minister's salary be withheld until the next election; the motion was defeated. He also opposed Blank's health insurance reform bill of 1960.

In the mid-1960s he drew up a plan for a Volksversicherung (people's insurance), which proposed compulsory pension insurance for all employees and the self-employed, a flexible retirement age and a benefit formula based on points. After he presented a resolution on it to the 1964 party conference, it became SPD policy. He was a member of the SPD's shadow team in the 1965 and 1969 election campaigns.

During the grand coalition of 1966–1969 he supported the government's social policy. From 1955 he had called for manual workers to receive continued pay from their employers during sickness on the same terms as salaried staff; this was enacted in 1969.

When the SPD and FDP formed a government in 1969, Willy Brandt appointed the trade union leader Walter Arendt as labour minister. Schellenberg declined an offer from Herbert Wehner of the post of parliamentary state secretary.

As committee chairman he dealt with the Works Constitution Act of 1971, in which he opposed the special protection for enterprises with political, religious or press aims but was outvoted within his parliamentary group. He also dealt with the pension reform of 1972, which allowed insured persons with at least 35 years of contributions to draw a pension from the age of 63 and opened statutory pension insurance to the self-employed and to housewives, and with the Occupational Safety Act of 1973.

In the negotiations on codetermination from 1974 he called for full parity between employee and shareholder representatives on supervisory boards. Wehner instead sought a compromise with the FDP.

=== Withdrawal from politics ===
After the 1972 election the chair of the SPD group's working group on social policy passed to Eugen Glombig, and in 1973 Schellenberg did not stand again for the party executive. He was in poor health in 1974 and 1975 and did not stand for re-election in 1976. His last speech in the Bundestag, on 8 April 1976, concerned the 19th Pension Adjustment Act. He chaired the committee for the last time on 2 June 1976; Adolf Müller (Remscheid) of the CDU chaired it for the rest of the term. During Schellenberg's chairmanship the committee dealt with 262 bills in 565 sittings.

== Personal life ==
In the late 1920s Schellenberg met the law student Anneliese Meyer, whose father, a senior civil servant who had converted from Judaism to Christianity, lost his post under the Nazis. She was barred from legal training under the racial laws and later completed a doctorate in Switzerland. The couple had a daughter, Cora-Beate (born 1938), and a son, Dierk (born 1939). They separated during the war and divorced after it. In 1947 Schellenberg married Annemarie, a lawyer and daughter of Karl Geiler, the first post-war Minister-President of Hesse. She was an SPD member of the Berlin House of Representatives from 1963 to 1967.

After leaving parliament Schellenberg returned to Berlin, where he died of pneumonia on 6 June 1984.

== Honours ==
- 1965: Grand Cross of Merit with Star of the Order of Merit of the Federal Republic of Germany
- 1972: Grand Cross of Merit with Star and Sash
- 1976: Grand Cross
