= Jonathan Elias Weiske =

German actor

- Born: 4 February 1996 (age 30); Berlin, Germany
- Occupations: Film and television actor and voice actor

Jonathan-Elias Weiske (born in Berlin on 4 February 1996) is a German film and television actor and voice actor.

Jonathan was born in Berlin son of Oliver Betke and Claudia Weiske, an artistic family, with his father being a film/television/theatre actor who had also appeared in musicals in addition to working also a synchronspeecher (voice over) and a photographer. Jonathan's mother also worked as an actress who had appeared amongst others in Gute Zeiten, schlechte Zeiten in the role Elke Opitz. She had also appeared in a number of theater productions in Berlin (in Theater am Kurfürstendamm), Dresden and in Hamburg.

Jonathan started as a child actor at age five. He had his screen debut appearing in the series Herzschlag-Die Retterand two years later in the short film Jesus Christ, directed by U. Preatel. He became well-known through the series Fünf Sterne that ran from 2005 to 2008 on ZDF, where he starting as a 9-year old, he played the character Martin Amann, who after his family faces financial difficulties, moves to Berlin to live with his mother to begin a new live.

Since then he took the lead in many productions, such as Hameln, Dornröschen und der Fluch der siebten Fee, F4LKENB3RG - Mord im Internat and the feature Films Misfit, Allein gegen die Zeit and The Vagabonds. He also made voice overs for popular International TV series like "Beauty in Black", "Heated Rivalry" and "Murdaugh: Death in the Family".

== In popular culture ==
Jonathan Elias Weiske voiced over the character "Frodo" for The Lord of the Rings: Aragorn's Quest video game (in German Die Abenteuer von Aragorn)

== Filmography ==
=== Film ===
- 2001: Herzschlag – Die Retter as Guido
- 2003: Jesus Christ as Christian
- 2005-2008: Fünf Sterne as Martin Amann
- 2008: Typisch Mann! as Leon
- 2009: Sind denn alle Männer Schweine? as Niklas Nielsen
- 2010: Bitte nicht stören as Tim
- 2011: Mandy will ans Meer
- 2014: Alkohol? Kenn dein Limit! as Niklas
- 2015: SOKO Wismar - Gras drüber as Joris Thiel
- 2015: Alles was zählt as Kevin
- 2015: Allein gegen die Zeit as Phil
- 2016: Notruf Hafenkante - Engel as Jonas Ravenstein
- 2016: Kleidercode as Basti
- 2016: Der Lehrer as Niklas Hardenberg
- 2016: Ellas Baby as Gregor
- 2017: Jannik as Dennis
- 2017: Respringendo as Max
- 2017: Der Kriminalist as Krys
- 2017: Das Pubertier as Paul
- 2017: Der Lehrer as Niklas Hardenberg
- 2017: Immigration Game as Yob
- 2018: AU/RA - Panic Room as Cleaner
- 2018: Mad Max - Beauty of the Heart as Yob
- 2018: Notruf Hafenkante as Michail Grigorov
- 2018: Wake Up Call as Mike
- 2018: Aimbot as Kai Neumann
- 2018: Grenzgänger as Joachim "Dschockie" Bergmeister
- 2018: Misfit - The movie as Justin Himmelmann
- 2019: Die jungen Ärzte as Viktor Lehmann
- 2019: Black Forest Witch as Hermann
- 2019: Circle of Life as Max Schröter
- 2019: Starnet as Lucas
- 2019: Leipzig Homicide as Daniel Behrens
- 2019: Die Wiederkehr as Thorben
- 2019: A War Poem as Pawel
- 2020: Unter Uns as Sebastian Hoffmann
- 2020: Cologne P.D. as Jan-Philip Curtius
- 2020: Alarm für Cobra 11 - Die Autobahnpolizei as Bennie Kaiser
- 2020: Jungfernfahrt as Niko
- 2020: Blutige Anfänger as Kai
- 2021: Nix Festes as Mateo
- 2021: Letzte Spur Berlin as Daniel Lamprecht
- 2022: The Vagabonds as Leon
- 2023: SOKO Wismar as Finn Borglund
- 2023: Leipzig Homicide as Max Kette
- 2024: Schnee im Juni as Leonard
- 2024: Die Bergretter as Bernd Göbner
- 2024: Dornröschen und der Fluch der siebten Fee as Prince Torin
- 2025: Notruf Hafenkante as Jesko Dreyer
- 2025: Hameln as Sam Mannheimer
- 2026: Aus der Stille as Ernst
- 2026: Skogstad as Vaadrim

=== Voice-over ===
- 2009: D.I.E Detektive im Einsatz / Kid's Detectives as Tom
- 2009: The Lord of the Rings: Aragorn's Quest as Frodo
- 2022: 9-1-1 (TV series) as Frankie
- 2022: Walker (TV series) as Cole
- 2022: Arthur, malédiction as Momo
- 2023: Door Mouse as Mooney
- 2023: Where Is Anne Frank as Sam
- 2025: Everybody Still Hates Chris as Jason
- 2025: Murdaugh: Death in the Family as Kai
- 2026: Bloodhounds (TV series) as Jae-Myeong
- 2026: Heated Rivalry as Hayden Pike
- 2026: If Wishes Could Kill as Min-Soo
- 2026: Mousetrap (TV series) as Min-Ho
- 2026: Voicemails for Isabelle as Walter
- 2026: Our Sticky Love as Gang-Rok
- 2026: Teach You a Lesson as In-Beom
- 2026: Beauty in Black as Angel
- 2026: Crew Girl as Bronson "Baloo" Garner
