= Nikolaus von Rauch =

Oberst and cavalry officer in the Prussian Army

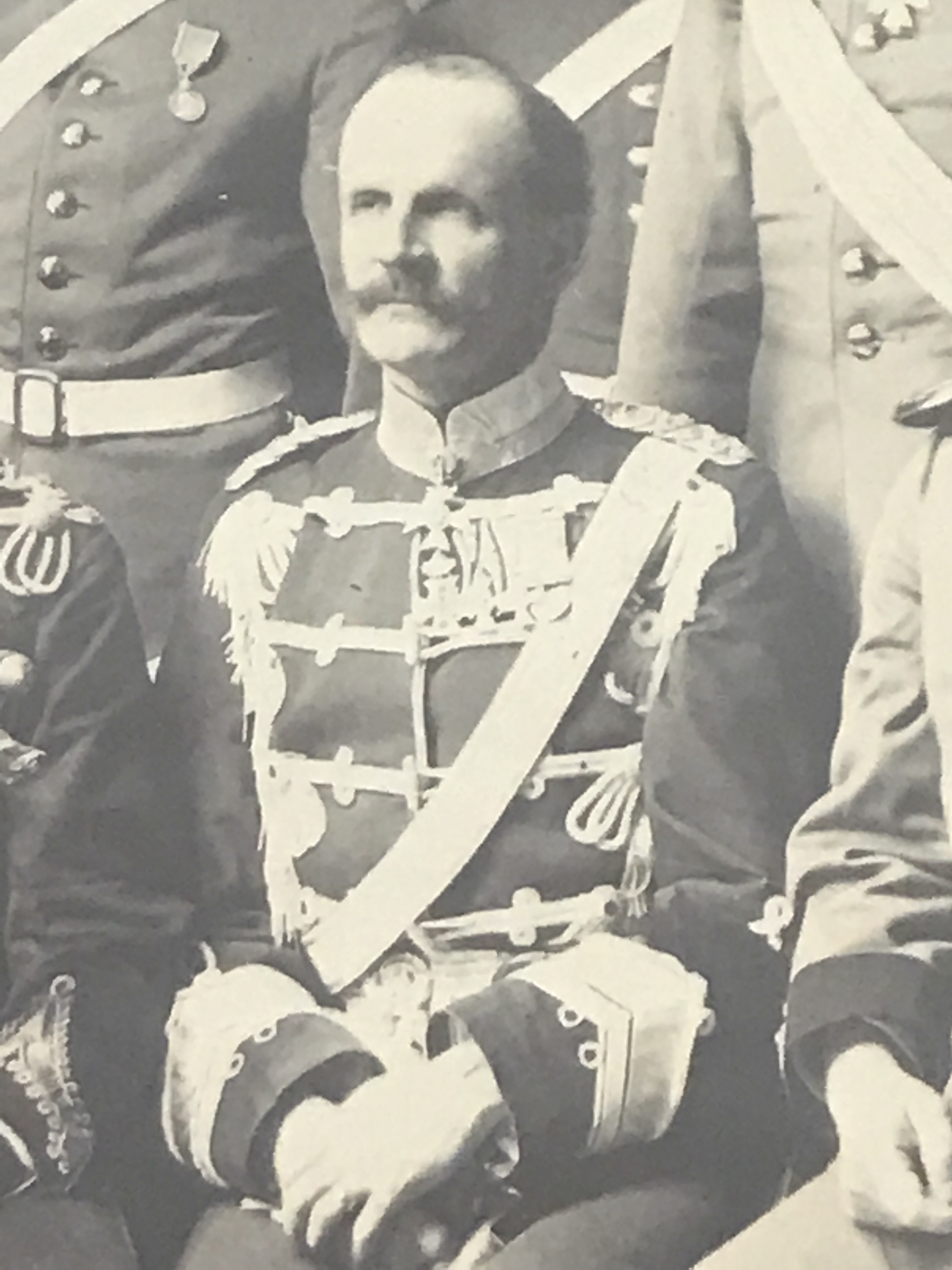
Nikolaus von Rauch during his time on the London delegation, 1901

Nikolaus Georg Gustav von Rauch (6 July 1851, in Berlin – 26 July 1904, in Stolp) was an Oberst and cavalry officer in the Prussian Army.

== Life ==
Nikolaus von Rauch was born in Berlin. Following his family's tradition he entered the Prussian Army in 1870. He served in the Franco-Prussian War in which he was promoted to Second-Leutnant and awarded the Iron Cross (second class). Later he became adjutant of the 15th Cavalry Brigade and then of the 11th Division in Breslau. In 1893 Rauch was a squadron commander in the 16th (2nd Hannover) Dragoon Regiment in Lüneburg. On April 4, 1899, Rauch became the commander of the 5th (Pomeranian) Hussar Regiment. He was part of Prussia's military delegation to the funeral of Queen Victoria in 1901. By March 1902 Rauch had been promoted to Oberst. From 1904 until his death he commanded the 29th Cavalry Brigade.

Von Rauch married the 22-year-old Elise von Bodelschwingh in Detmold on 3 January 1883. He died in Stolp in Pomerania on 26 July 1904.
