= Fritz Oppenheimer =

German-American lawyer

Fritz Ernst Oppenheimer
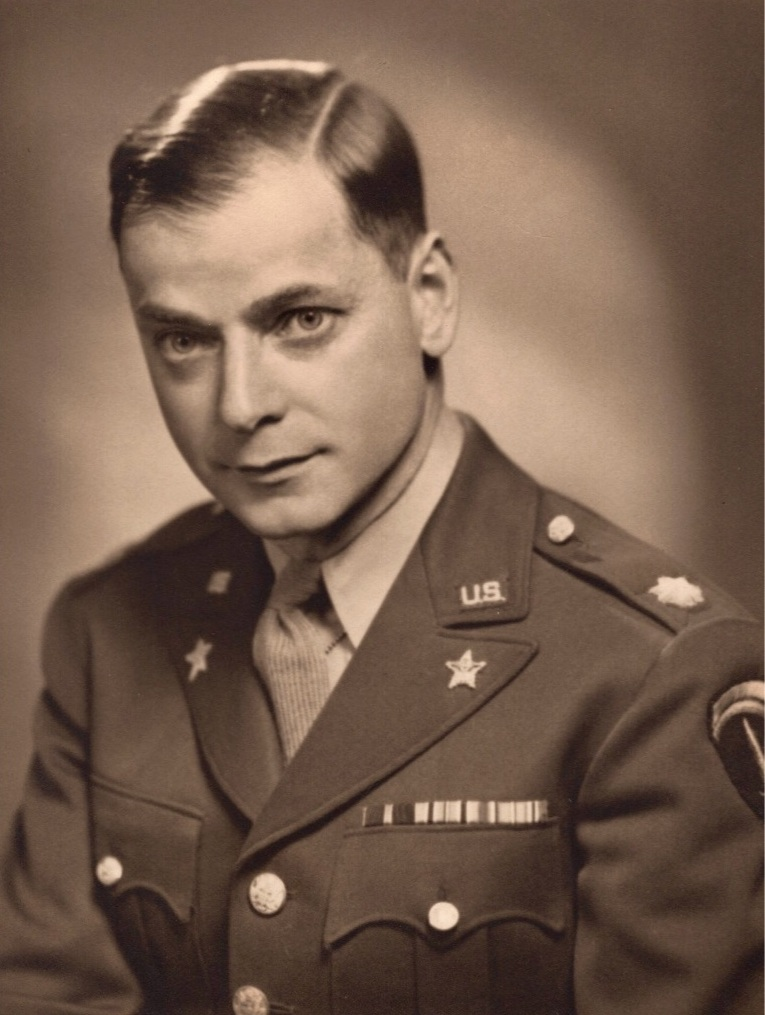
- US Army Lieutenant Colonel Fritz Oppenheimer, 1946
- Born: 10 March 1898; Berlin, Prussia, German Empire
- Died: 4 February 1968 (aged 69); Nairobi, Kenya
- Occupation: Imperial German Army Master Sergeant 1915-1918 US Army Lt. Colonel 1943-1946 US State Department 1946-1949 International Lawyer
- Known for: Denazification
- Spouse: Elsbeth Kaulla (m. 1927)
- Children: Ellen Ingabord Oppenheimer (Handler), Ernst Albert Oppenheimer
- Parent(s): Ernst Oppenheimer, Amalie Oppenheimer (Friedlander)

Fritz Ernst Oppenheimer (10 March 1898– 4 February 1968) was a German American lawyer. Being Jewish, he emigrated from Nazi Germany, first to England in 1938 and then to the United States in 1940. He later returned as part of the Supreme Headquarters Allied Expeditionary Force and helped draft denazification laws.

Born in Berlin as a son of lawyer Ernst Oppenheimer and Amalie Friedländer, Fritz Oppenheimer joined the Imperial German Army at 17 and remained for three years, serving in the Prussian riding artillery units at battles including Verdun, Chateau Thierry and Ternopil. He was awarded two Iron Crosses for his service. After the Armistice, Oppenheimer studied law at the Humboldt University of Berlin, the University of Freiburg, and the University of Breslau. He joined his father's law firm in 1925, practicing international law and representing international interests including the American Chamber of Commerce, and took over the firm after his father's death in 1928.

After the rise of Nazism, it became increasingly difficult for Oppenheimer to work as a notary, and he was eventually forced to practice law using Aryan attorney Wolfram von Metzler as a business front. In July 1938, von Metzler informed him that the Gestapo sought to arrest him, and he fled the country. In New York City, he provided paralegal services to Cadwalader, Wickersham & Taft until 1943, when the U.S. Army raised its recruitment age limit to 45. He enlisted in basic training in Michigan's Camp Custer, and once he graduated became a [[Citizenship in the United States#Pathways to citizenship|]]naturalized U.S. citizen. He had multiple connections to American power brokers, including Assistant Secretary of War John J. McCloy, and it was determined that his mastery of a half-dozen languages and German legal practices would best be put to use by making him a legal aide and translator to General Dwight D. Eisenhower.

During the remainder of the war, Oppenheimer traveled with Eisenhower, helping to write The Handbook for Military Government in Germany and German versions of Proclamation No. 1 and the Surrender Document signed in Berlin on May 9, 1945. Postwar, in the U.S. Zone of Berlin, he helped denazify the German legal system and recruited justices who supported democracy. Appointed to the General Staff Corps under General Lucius D. Clay in October 1945, Oppenheimer helped negotiate the Law for Political Liberation from National Socialism and Militarism. He was awarded the Bronze Star and the Legion of Merit by the United States Army and rose to the rank of Lieutenant Colonel.

In 1946, Oppenheimer joined the State Department and served as Legal Advisor to Secretary of State George Marshall and Dean Acheson until 1949. During the 1950s, Oppenheimer worked as an international lawyer

Oppenheimer retired in 1960 and moved to Palo Alto, California. He died on February 4, 1968 in Nairobi, Kenya due to heart disease.
