= Wolf-Dieter Schneider (metallurgist) =

German metallurgist, manager of foundry and university professor (1942–2025)

- Born: 2 October 1942; Berlin, Germany
- Died: 15 March 2025 (aged 82); Essen, Germany
- Education: Technische Universität Berlin, RWTH Aachen University
- Occupations: Metallurgist, foundry manager, professor
- Spouse: Ursula (died 2017)
- Scientific career
- Workplaces: Federal Ministry of Education and Research, Freiberg University of Mining and Technology

Wolf-Dieter Schneider (2 October 1942 – 15 March 2025) was a German metallurgist, foundry manager and university professor.

== Life ==
Wolf-Dieter Schneider was born on 2 October 1942 in Berlin, Germany.

He studied foundry science at RWTH Aachen University and Technische Universität Berlin. In 1965, he obtained his diploma in Berlin. In 1969 he became a Doktoringenieur (Dr.-Ing.) at the Foundry Institute of Technische Universität Berlin. PhD. He then took on tasks in the German foundry industry. Initially in managerial positions at Rheinstahl Hüttenwerke, he was appointed Technical Director of August Engels GmbH in Velbert in 1982 and two years later he was appointed to the executive board of Thyssen Guss AG. In 1989 he changed to the management of the Otto Junker GmbH in Simmerath as chairman. Between 1993 and 1995 he was significantly involved in the restructuring of the foundry industry in the new federal states for the Treuhandanstalt in Berlin. He was then managing director of M.I.M Hüttenwerke Duisburg, chairman of the board of Deutsche Gießerei- und Industrie-Holding AG (DIHAG) and later chairman of the supervisory board.

In 2000, he worked for the Federal Ministry of Education and Research as an expert in the field of innovative environmental technologies in the metal production and foundry industry. In 2007, the Freiberg University of Mining and Technology appointed him honorary professor. He taught modern management methods in foundry operations.

With his wife Ursula who died in 2017, he set up the foundation fund Ursula and Prof. Dr. Wolf-Dieter Schneider to promote research and teaching in engineering and economics in Freiberg in 2006 or 2007.

Schneider is a Weinheim Corps student. In 1964, he joined the Corps Albingia Dresden in Aachen and, after moving to Berlin, the Corps Cheruscia. Today he is the old man of the Corps Marko-Guestphalia Aachen and Cheruscia Berlin.

== Fonts ==
- Untersuchungen des Kristallisationsablaufs von Eisen und Eisenlegierungen im Hochtemperaturmikroskop, 1969
