= List of things named after Michael Faraday =

Here is a list of things named in honour of scientist Michael Faraday:

== Science ==
- Faraday (unit), or just faraday – An obsolete unit of charge that has been superseded by the coulomb
- farad, SI unit of capacitance
- Faraday balance – Device for measuring magnetism of an object
- Faraday cage – Enclosure of conductive mesh used to block electric fields
- Faraday constant – The amount of electric charge per mole of electrons
- Faraday cup – Charged particle catcher
  - Faraday cup electrometer – Form of an electrical aerosol instrument used in aerosol studies
- Faraday dark space – The dark area in front of a cathode in a vacuum tube
- Homopolar generator, aka Faraday disc or Faraday wheel
- Faraday effect – Physical magneto-optical phenomenon
  - Faraday filter, aka atomic line filter – Optical band-pass filter used in the physical sciences
  - Inverse Faraday effect – Magnetization by polarized light
  - Faraday rotation (see Faraday effect)
- Faraday efficiency – Efficiency of charge transfer in an electrochemical reaction
  - Faraday-efficiency effect – Cause of data interpretation errors in electrochemistry
- Faraday flashlight, aka mechanically powered flashlight
- Faraday's ice pail experiment
- Faraday Institute for Science and Religion – Research institute in the UK
- The Faraday Institution – Nonprofit organization in Didcot, United Kingdom
- Faraday's laws of electrolysis
- Faraday's law of induction
  - Maxwell–Faraday equation
- Faraday paradox (electromagnetism)
- Faraday paradox (electrochemistry)
- Faraday rotator
- Faraday tensor, also known as electromagnetic tensor – Mathematical object that describes the electromagnetic field in spacetime
- Faraday wave – Ripples on liquid within a vibrating receptacle

== Places ==
- Faraday building – The first telephone exchange to open in London, later the first International Switching Centre
- Faraday Building, Manchester
- The Faraday lecture theatre inside the Faraday Building at Lancaster University in Lancashire, England
- Faraday Research Station – A former British research station in Antarctica, now called Vernadsky Research Base and operated by Ukraine
- Faraday Road – Roads in Penang, and in Kuala Lumpur, Malaysia both nearby Tenaga Nasional headquarters and power station.
- Faraday (ward) – An electoral ward in the London Borough of Southwark
- Faraday Dam – A dam on the Clackamas River in the U.S. state of Oregon
- Faraday House – One of the buildings at the headquarters of Vodafone, a telecommunications company in Newbury, Berkshire
- Mount Faraday in New Zealand's Paparoa Range
- Faraday Hall - One of the catered halls of residence at Loughborough University

== Others ==
- CS Faraday (1874) – A Siemens AG cable ship launched in 1874
- CS Faraday (1923) – A Siemens AG cable ship launched in 1923
- Faraday (crater) – A lunar impact crater
- 37582 Faraday – A main-belt asteroid
- Faraday Future – electric car company
- Faradaya – A genus of flowering plants
  - Oxera splendida – A species of vine formerly known as Faradaya splendida

== See also ==
- Faraday (disambiguation)
- Faraday Prize (disambiguation)
