= CS Faraday =

Two cable ships have been named CS Faraday after the scientist Michael Faraday:

- CS Faraday (1874), built for Siemens Brothers & Co, sold in 1924 as a hulk, and scrapped in 1950
- CS Faraday (1923), built to replace the previous ship, sunk by German aircraft off South Wales in 1941
