= Faraday (disambiguation) =

Michael Faraday was an early 19th-century British scientist (physicist and chemist).

Faraday may also refer to:

== Places ==
- Faraday, Victoria, Australia
- Faraday, Ontario, Canada
- Faraday, an electoral ward in Greater London
- Faraday, West Virginia, US

== Ships ==
- CS Faraday (1874), a Siemens AG cable ship
- CS Faraday (1923), a Siemens AG cable ship

== Other uses ==
- Faraday (unit), a unit of charge
- Faraday (crater), a lunar crater
- Faraday (company), a New Jersey company specializing in fire protection
- Faraday Electronics, a defunct American computer motherboard and chipset manufacturer
- Faraday Technology, a Taiwanese semiconductor company
- 37582 Faraday, a main-belt asteroid
- Faraday building, a telephone exchange in London
- Faraday Hall, a hall of residence at Loughborough University
- Faraday Research Station, a former British research station in Antarctica
- Faraday Dam, a dam on the Clackamas River in Oregon
- Faraday, a character in the Wayfarer Redemption series by Sara Douglass
- Faraday, a fictional planet in Rocannon's World by Ursula K. Le Guin

== People with the surname ==
- David Faraday, victim of the Zodiac Killer
- Philip Michael Faraday, English lawyer, composer and theatrical producer

=== Fictional characters ===
- Faraday, lead character in the Showtime series The Man Who Fell To Earth
- Daniel Faraday, a character on Lost
- King Faraday, a secret agent featured in DC Comics
- Max Faraday, the title character of Divine Right: The Adventures of Max Faraday
- Helen Faraday, the title character in Blonde Venus, as well as her husband Edward Faraday and son Johnny Faraday.
- Joshua Faraday, a character in The Magnificent Seven
- Kay Faraday, a character from Ace Attorney Investigations
- Dr. Louis Faraday, a NASA scientist from Flight of the Navigator
- Michael Faraday, tutor of Rowan Damish and Citra Terranova in the book Scythe
- Anne Faraday, a U.S. Air Force colonel in Horizon Forbidden West

== See also ==
- Farad, an SI unit of capacitance
- Faraday cage, an enclosure of conductive mesh used to block electric fields
- Faraday constant, an amount of electric charge
- Faraday cup
- Faraday Flashlight, a mechanically powered flashlight
- Faraday Future, American electric vehicle manufacturer
- Faraday Prize (disambiguation)
- Faraday's law of induction
- Ferriday, Louisiana
- Feraday
