= Pierre-Émile Martin =

French industrial engineer (1824–1915)

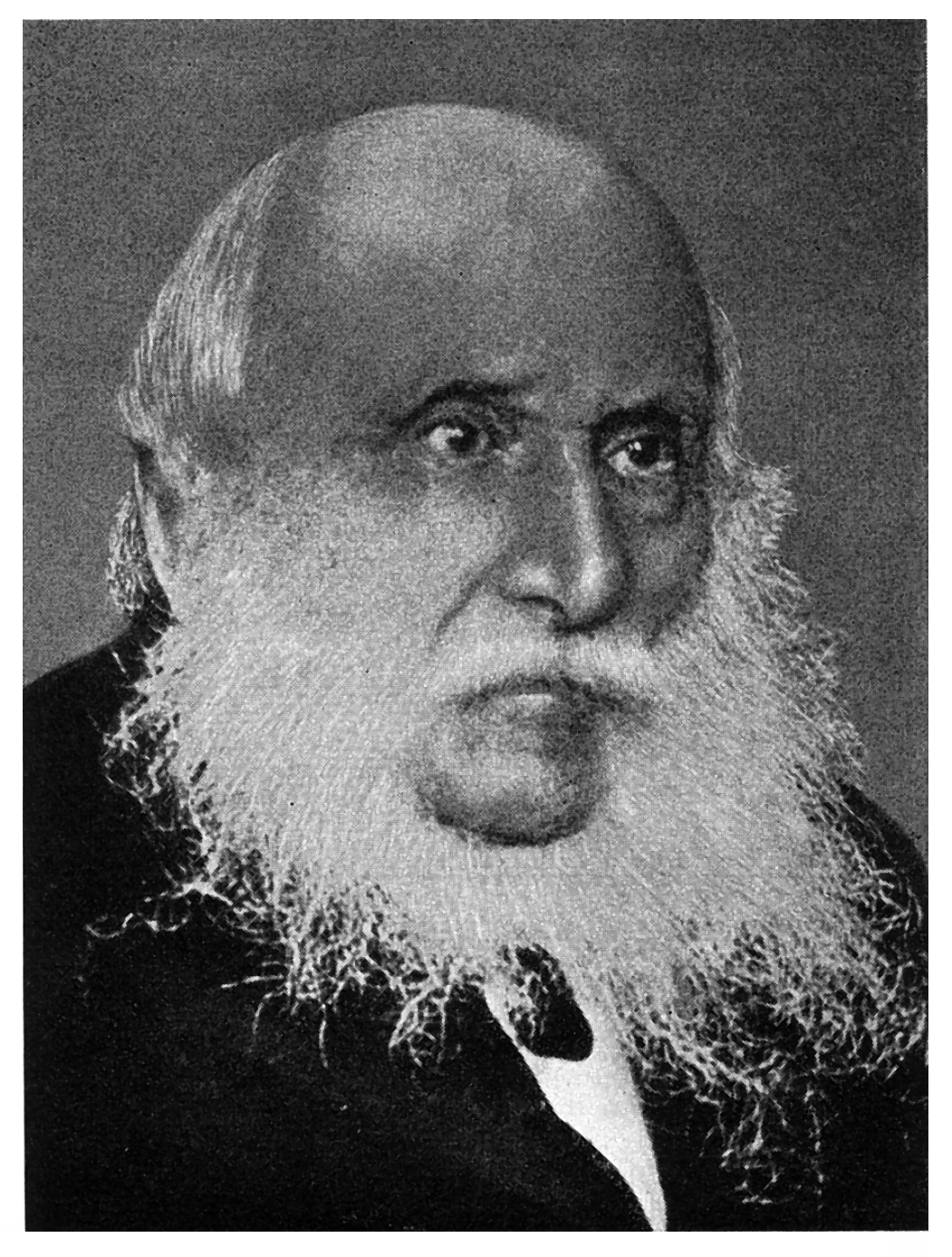
- Born: 18 August 1824; Bourges
- Died: 23 May 1915 (aged 90); Fourchambault

Pierre-Émile Martin (French: [pjɛʁ emil maʁtɛ̃]; 18 August 1824, Bourges, Cher – 23 May 1915, Fourchambault) was a French industrial engineer. He applied the principle of recovery of the hot gas in an open hearth furnace, a process invented by Carl Wilhelm Siemens.

In 1865, based on the Siemens process, he implemented the process which bears his name for producing steel in a hearth by remelting scrap steel with the addition of cast iron for the dilution of impurities.

His work earned him the award of the Bessemer Gold Medal of the Iron and Steel Institute in 1915 and of the French nation (knight in 1878 then Officer of the Legion of Honour in 1910).

== Martin steel ==
The metal obtained using Martin's process has been called Martin steel. This steel contain much less impurities than those produced in the Bessemer converter, and its composition much better controlled. The development of the process made it possible to use scrap steel and cast iron and to produce steel with a reputation for being of better quality than Bessemer steel. On the other hand, the process takes longer and the production costs are consequently higher. The invention was tested and implemented at the Sireuil foundry in Charente. The product was awarded a Gold Medal at the Paris Exhibition of 1867.

== Martin-Siemens Process ==
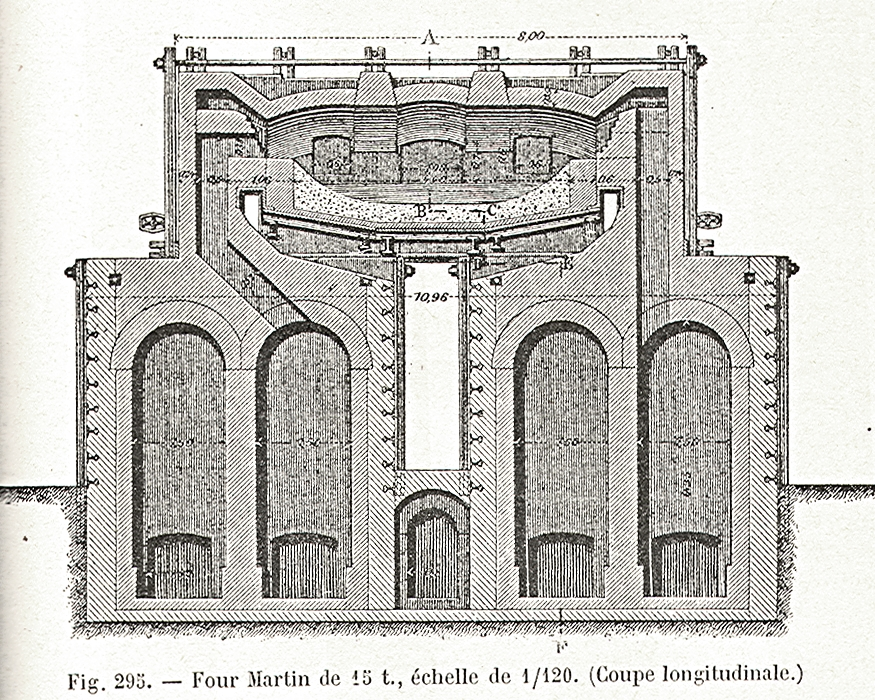
Siemens-Martin open hearth furnace

The process of refining steel in a hearth, as developed by Pierre-Émile Martin, consists of smelting a mixture of cast iron and scrap or ore, then refining it by decarburization, desulfurization and dephosphorization. This method makes it possible to produce fine and alloy steels by adding noble elements.

The process employs a gas-heated reverberatory furnace with recovery of the heat from the flue gases as in the Siemens system.

== Bibliography ==
- Larousse encyclopédique en couleurs, 1978
- Article includes content from the equivalent article in French Wikipedia
