= Feraday =

Feraday is a surname. Notable people with the surname include:

- Caroline Feraday (born 1977), English television and radio presenter
- Stephen Feraday (born 1959), Canadian javelin thrower

== See also ==
- Faraday (disambiguation)
- Ferriday, Louisiana
