= Siemens Brothers =

Business in London, England

Siemens Brothers and Company Limited
- House flag
- Industry: electrical industry
- Founded: 1865
- Defunct: 1951; 75 years ago
- Fate: Acquired by Associated Electrical Industries
- Headquarters: London, United Kingdom
- Parent: Siemens

Siemens Brothers and Company Limited was an electrical engineering design and manufacturing business in London, England. It was first established as a branch (Note: The company started with a small factory at 12 Millbank Row, Westminster SW1, London, near the site of Lambeth Bridge) in 1858 by a brother of the founder of the German electrical engineering firm Siemens & Halske. The principal works were at Woolwich where cables and light-current electrical apparatus were produced from 1863 until 1968. The site between the Thames Barrier and Woolwich Dockyard has retained several buildings of historic interest. New works were built at Stafford in 1903 and Dalston in 1908.

During World War I Siemens Brothers was bought by a British consortium because most of its ownership was in the hands of enemy aliens; see Graces Guide to British Industrial History.

Siemens Brothers and Company Limited was bought by Associated Electrical Industries in 1955. At that time its business was described as follows: manufacture sale and installation of submarine and land cables, overhead telegraph, telephone and power transmission lines, public and private telephone exchanges and carrier transmission equipment for telephone lines and marine radio and signalling equipment. Through subsidiaries it was engaged in the manufacture of lamps of all kinds, miscellaneous electrical equipment and electrical railway signals.

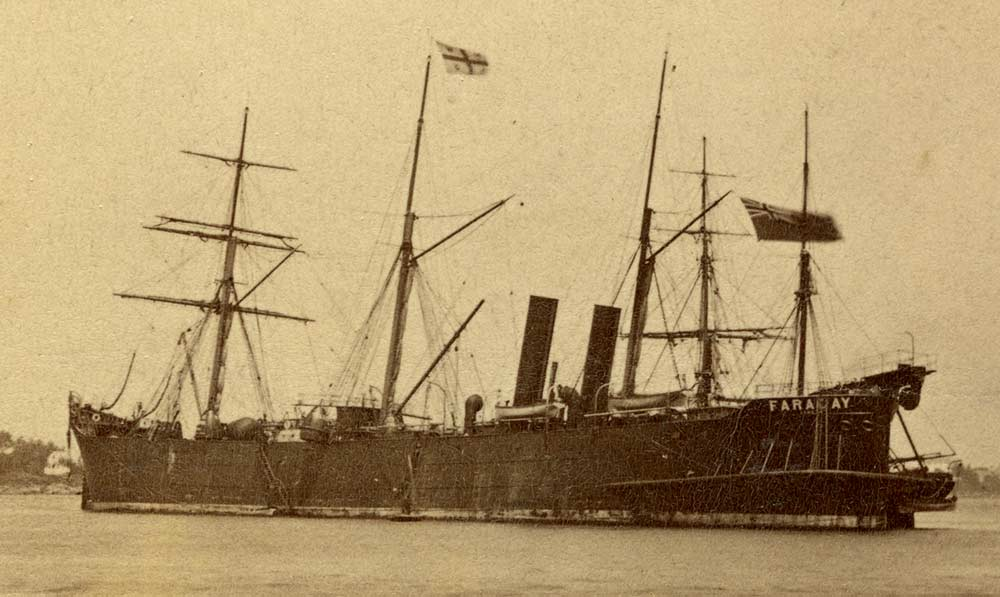
Siemens Brothers and Company cable ship CS Faraday shortly after her launch in 1874. Designed by Sir William Siemens she was finally scrapped in 1950. Replaced in 1923 by a new CS Faraday sunk by bombing 1941

== The Siemens family ==
The German Siemens brothers came from a highly educated upper-middle-class family in relatively humble economic circumstances. Their father farmed a leased estate. The elder brothers of the family were born in the Kingdom of Hanover. In 1823, the year William (Wilhelm) was born, the family moved to the Baltic coast, near Lübeck. Both parents had died by the time William was 17. (Note: Christian Ferdinand Siemens (1787-1840), known as Ferdinand, born in Wasserleben, married Eleonore Deichmann (1793-1839). Their children were: Ludwig Siemens (1812–1871), Matilde (1814–1878; married to Carl Himly, professor of chemistry at the University of Göttingen), Werner Siemens (1815–1815), Ernst Werner von Siemens (1816–1892), Hans Dietrich Siemens (1818–1867; ran the Dresden glassworks), Ferdinand Julius Siemens (1820–1893; farmed a large estate in Königsberg, East Prussia), Sophie Henriette (1821–1821), William Siemens (1823–1883), Friedrich August Siemens (1826–1904; “The Dresden Siemens” who revolutionised the industry and became Europe's largest glass manufacturer), Carl Heinrich von Siemens (1829–1906), Franz Siemens (1831–1840), Walter Siemens (1832–1868; Prussian consul at Tiflis, laying the Indo-European cable), Sophie Siemens (1834–1922; married to Dr Carl Crome of Lübeck), and Otto Siemens (1836–1871; North German consul at Tiflis). William Pole: The Life of Sir William Siemens, Murray, London 1888.)

- Sir William Siemens (1823–1883), the fourth of eight surviving sons in the family, his primary interests were in electric telegraphing and lighting; founder of Siemens Brothers in the UK
- Ernst Werner von Siemens (1816–1892), Sir William's elder brother; founder of Siemens & Halske
- Carl Heinrich von Siemens (1829–1906) was another brother who opened a branch office in Saint Petersburg in 1853, then joined William in London in 1869 but in the 1880s returned first to Russia then Berlin to become the head of Siemens & Halske after the death of Ernst Werner Siemens
- Alexander Siemens (1847–1928) was a distant cousin who joined William in Woolwich in 1867. He was adopted by the childless Sir William and his wife and he too became a naturalised British subject. Managing director from 1889 to 1899 he remained on the board until he retired in 1918, aged 70.
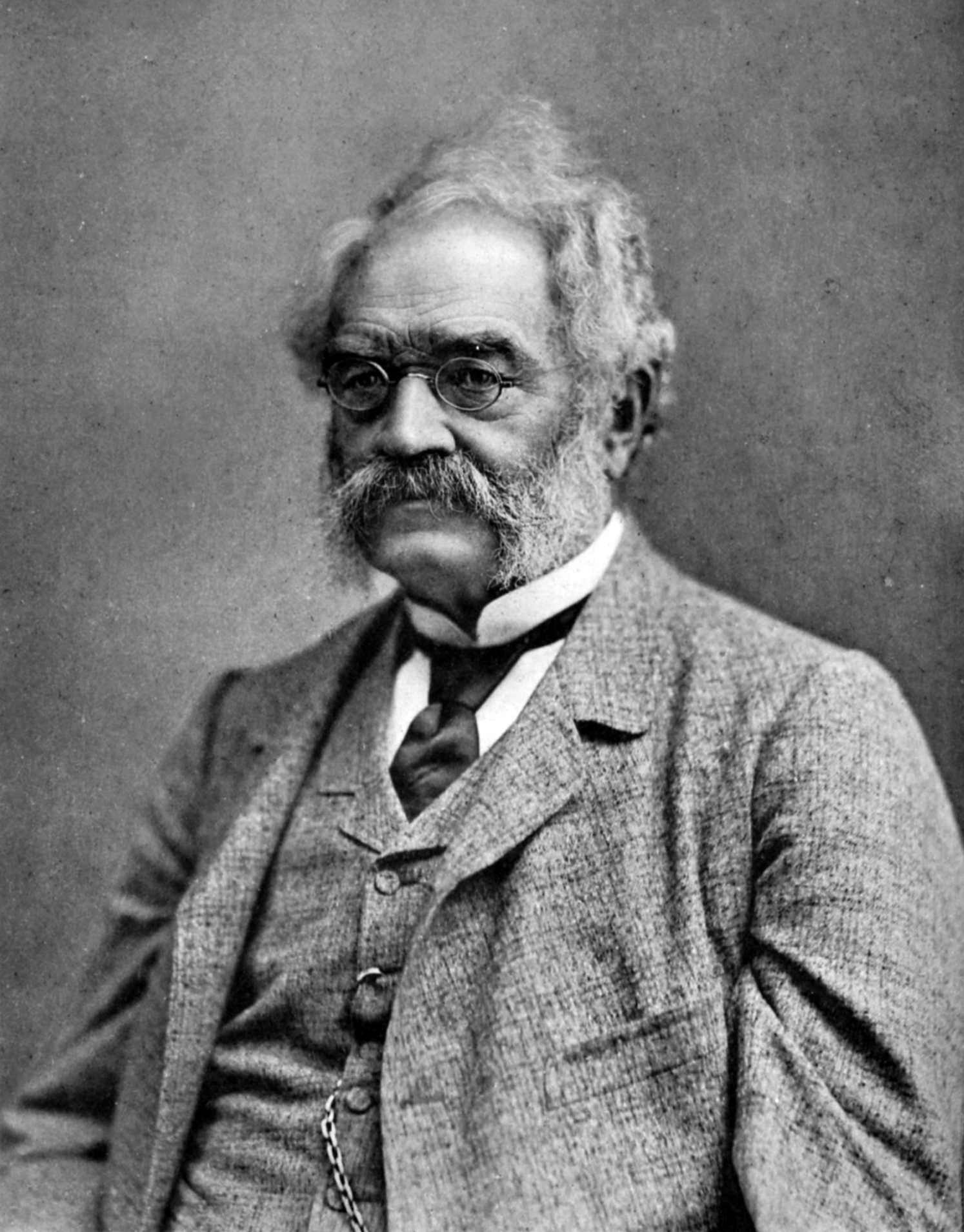
Werner

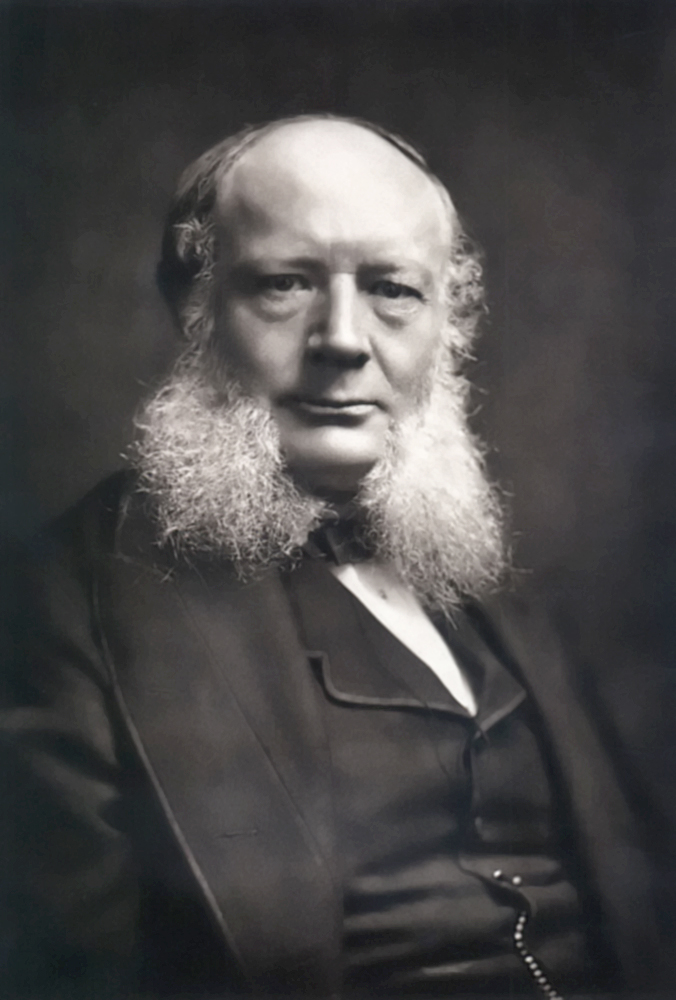
Sir William

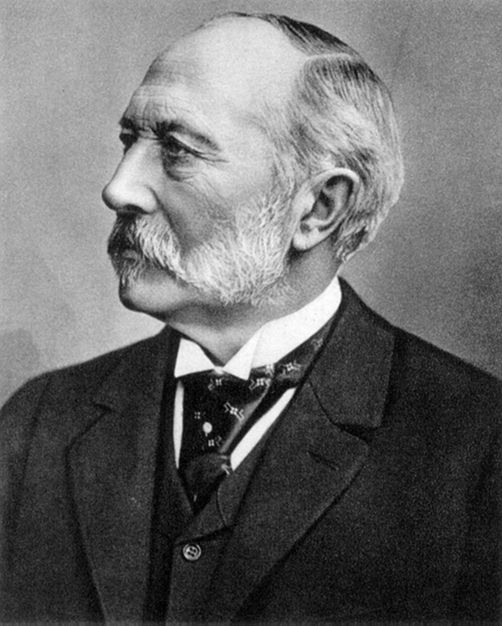
Carl

Profit distribution between the brothers, it reflects contribution not just ownership.

	Werner	William	Carl
Berlin	50	25	25
London	35	45	20
Petersburg	35	20	45

== Siemens & Halske, 1858-1865 ==
On 1 October 1858, the German firm Siemens & Halske established an English firm, Siemens & Halske & Company, a partnership of William Siemens, cable manufacturer R S Newall of Gateshead and Siemens & Halske of Berlin. Its purpose was to help lay Newall's newly developed submarine communications cable. The London branch was under the control of William, later Sir William Siemens, formerly known as Carl Wilhelm Siemens (1823–1883). Hanover-born Sir William went to England in 1843 (Note: The Kingdom of Hanover was in personal union with the United Kingdom until 1837 and a link remained until annexation by Prussia in 1866) to sell a patent he shared with his brother Werner. He found employment in Birmingham with engineers Fox, Henderson & Co and became a naturalised British subject in 1859, the same day as he married the daughter of an Edinburgh lawyer. Her brother was Lewis Gordon business partner of R S Newall. During the 1850s Sir William developed the Siemens regenerative furnace.

Following various failures in Newall's installed cables the link with them was dropped at the end of 1860.

In 1865 Johann Georg Halske, partner in Siemens & Halske, withdrew from the English branch following failures in the London firm's work so then it became Siemens Brothers.

== Siemens Brothers Telegraph Works ==
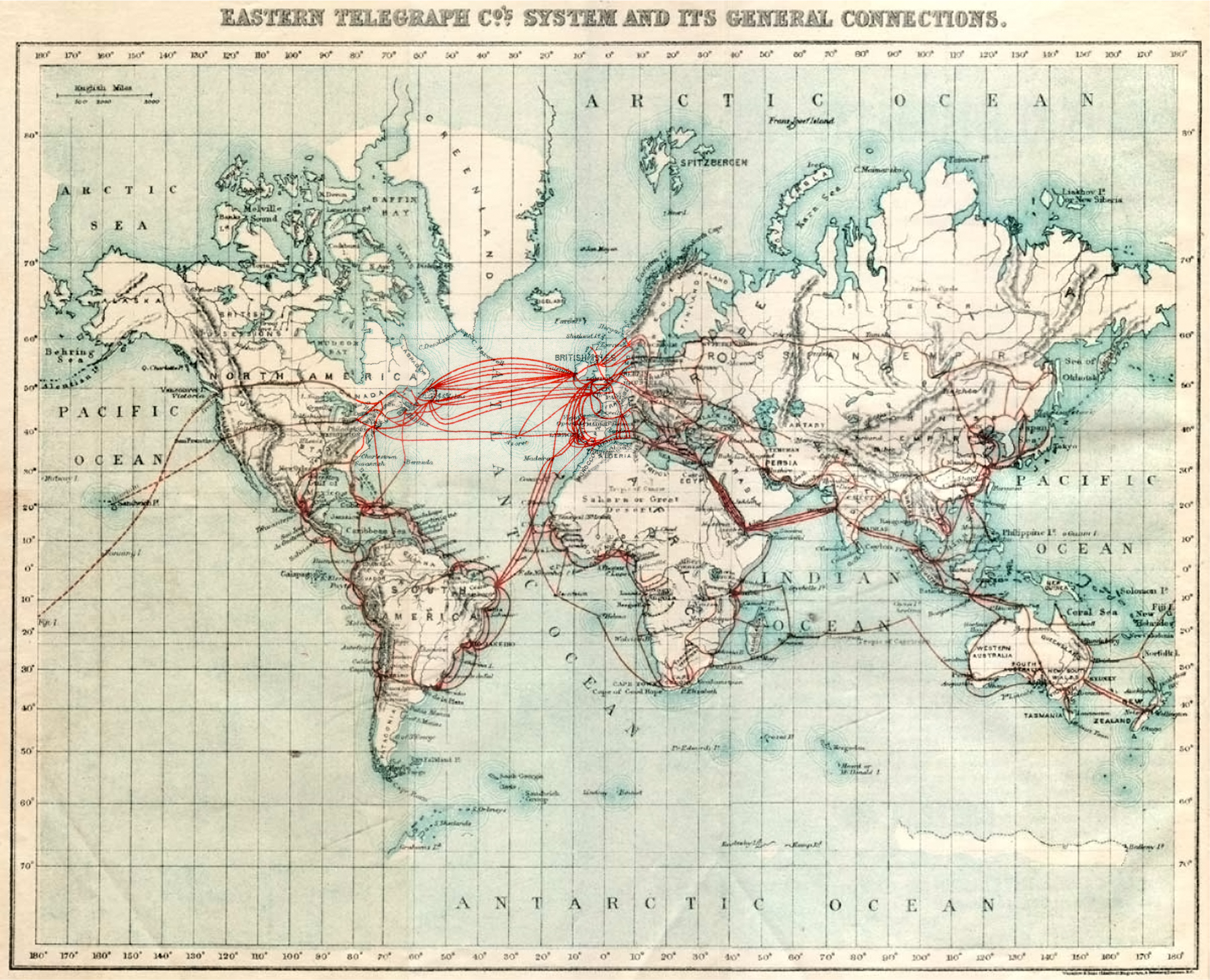
Submarine telegraph cable routes 1901

=== Submarine cables ===
Siemens Brothers Telegraph Works opened as a new cable factory in Woolwich, London in 1863. It expanded to cover over 6 acres and employed more than 2,000 people. In 1869 the London and Berlin firms jointly made and laid a telegraph line from Prussia to Teheran which formed a principal part of the direct line from England to India, 2,750 miles. Principal cables made and laid by Siemens Brothers between 1873 and 1883:

- In 1874-5 the London firm alone completed the first direct Atlantic cable, known as the DUS (Direct United States Cable Company), to USA.
- In 1876 a direct Paris-New York cable was discussed in France. In March 1879 Siemens Brothers was given the order by banker Pouyer-Quertier. They finished making the PQ cable at Woolwich in the middle of June when the Faraday set out to do the laying under the control of Ludwig Loeffler. The main cable was handed over to the owners in little more than four months. Neither France nor USA had a cable-making factory.
- 1881 Western Union England to Nova Scotia north cable
- 1882 Western Union England to Nova Scotia south cable

The construction and laying of cables remained the firm's main occupation until Sir William's death in 1883. (Note: The principal rivals were: Telegraph Construction & Maintenance Company Limited; India-Rubber, Gutta-Percha & Telegraph Works Company Limited; W T Henley's Telegraph Works Company Limited; Hooper's Telegraph Works Company Limited; J D Scott, Siemens Brothers 1858–1958, Weidenfeld & Nicolson, London, 1958) Following his death shares were offered, somewhat unwillingly, to London manager Johann Carl Ludwig Loeffler (1831–1906) to retain his services. He managed to increase his holding to 25% but there were disagreements as to how the firm was run and Alexander Siemens, William's adopted son, replaced Loeffler in 1888. Werner bought Loeffler's shareholding. Loeffler died in the Tyrol 18 years later leaving an estate in excess of £1.5 million, he was a prominent investor in West Australian mines.

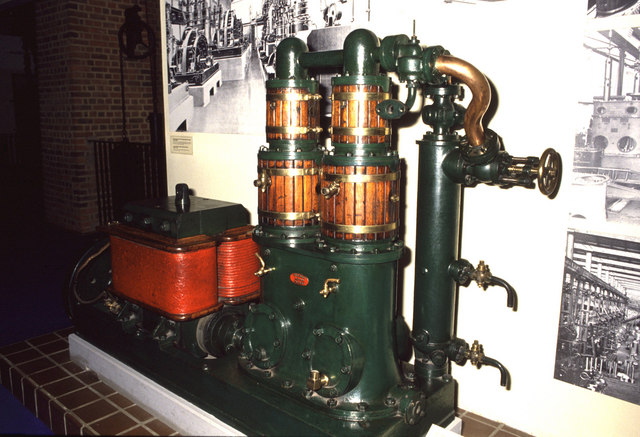
10 kW Siemens dynamo running at 450 rpm with its Willans steam engine

=== Heavy-current products ===
The invention of the dynamo in 1867 led to a switch from Siemens' previous strength in light-current products to heavy-current products and processes. The world's first modern high-voltage power station was opened in 1891, Deptford East. Designed in 1887 by 23-year-old former Siemens' apprentice Sebastian de Ferranti it was erected by the London Electricity Supply Corporation on the Thames bank at Deptford Creek, two and a half miles west of Siemens' Woolwich site. Berlin was anxious that the London business should break its reliance on the submarine cable business. The London County Council discouraged that kind of development and after considering other locations Stafford was settled on. 500 acres of freehold land were purchased there in 1900 and building began in 1901.

Following the invention of the arc lamps, their manufacture was taken up by Siemens Brothers.

=== Reorganisations ===
In December 1880 a limited liability company was formed to own the firm and it was named Siemens Brothers and Company Limited. There were just seven shareholders, the legal minimum. All except Loeffler were family members. William was chairman and Loeffler managing director.

In 1899, the Siemens family bought back all shares not held by family members.

By 1900 Siemens Brothers had constructed and laid seven North Atlantic cables

== Stafford and Dalston sites ==
In 1903, with Nuremberg's Elektrizitäts-Aktiengesellschaft vormals Schuckert & Co or E.-AG, they formed a new entity, Siemens-Schuckertwerke, to hold all their jointly owned heavy-current operations. The first step in England was to build a new factory in Stafford for heavy-current business. In 1906 Siemens-Schuckertwerke leased the Stafford factory, formed a company to operate it and called the company Siemens Brothers Dynamo Works Limited.

In November 1919 it was announced by English Electric that they had bought the Siemens works at Stafford (Siemens Brothers Dynamo Works Limited and its attendant sales and engineering organisation) and had entered into "a working agreement with Siemens Brothers and Co for the preferential exchange of the special products of each company".

In 1908, Siemens Brothers Dynamo Works Limited opened a metal filament lamp factory in rented premises at Tyssen Street, Dalston, London. In 1919 its capacity was 2.5 million lamps per annum but advances in technology left its products unwanted and the Dalston factory closed in 1923.

== Around World War I ==
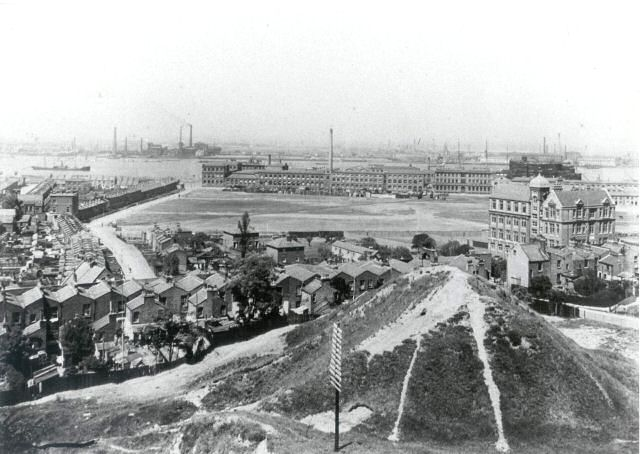
The Siemens Brothers site in Woolwich as seen from Maryon Park in 1905

In 1911 the company was doing well and several new buildings went up at the Woolwich site. An L-shaped five-storey building, used for making rubber-coated copper-wire cable, was among the largest factories in London when built. Also in 1911, a new office building went up in the same plain brick style. Just before World War I, Siemens had more employees in Britain than in Germany (around 10,000).

Under the Trading with the Enemy Act 1914 foreign ownership was transferred to UK's Public Trustee. Following a 1916 amendment to that act tenders were called for. The amendment required enemy assets to be sold and the proceeds held by the same trustee until the end of hostilities. Siemens Brothers and Company was bought by Messrs C Birch Crisp and Co on 14 December 1917. Financier Charles Birch Crisp was leading a consortium of investors who were not connected with the electrical engineering industry.

In 1920 it was reported the land and buildings at Woolwich now covered about seventeen and a half acres.

Activities:

Cables manufactured—the catalogue grew to include underground super-tension power mains, telegraph trunk lines and underground telephone cables, overhead lines and electric light cables.

Apparatus manufactured—grew from telegraph apparatus to include: marine and mine signalling apparatus, measuring and scientific instruments, wireless telegraphy, telephone exchanges (manual and automatic) and apparatus, wet and dry batteries, landlines, ebonite, cable accessories and joint boxes

=== Spin-offs ===
- Siemens and English Electric Lamp Company Limited Previously known as English Electric and Siemens Supplies Limited from 1 January 1923 this jointly owned company took over the electric lamp factories at Dalton and Preston. It also controlled the sale of the lamps it manufactured and provided the sales organisation for Siemens' and English Electric's wires and cables, house-wiring systems and accessories, Zed fuses, wireless apparatus, telephones, instruments etc.
- Siemens and General Electric Railway Signal Company Limited In 1926, Siemens Brothers and GEC, combined their railway signaling activities to form the Siemens and General Electric Railway Signal Co.
- Submarine Cables Limited In 1935, Siemens Brothers merged its submarine cables division with the Telegraph Construction and Maintenance Company to form Submarine Cables Ltd.

== World War II ==
A 15% shareholding belonging to Siemens & Halske was transferred to the Custodian of Enemy Property. Siemens Brothers coverage of the whole field of telecommunications meant the volume and range of their wartime supply of cables and apparatus was enormous extending to the manufacture of radar equipment. The Woolwich factory was severely bombed (27 air raids were aimed at the plant) and many buildings were destroyed or damaged. Shortly before the war, the workforce numbered over 9,000. During the war it fell to around 7,000. After the war Siemens Brothers joined with Metropolitan-Vickers Electrical Company to further develop radar for ships.

=== PLUTO ===
One of the many critical components of World War II's Operation Overlord was to ensure a steady supply of fuel to the Allied forces. Operation Pluto (PipeLine Under The Ocean) was facilitated by Mr A C Hartley, chief engineer of the Anglo-Iranian Oil Company, who suggested to Siemens Brothers that a submarine cable might be modified to carry petrol below the channel to France. Siemens Brothers' experience with gas pressure cables lead to their design manufacture and trial (under the Thames) of what became PLUTO. PLUTO delivered more than a million gallons of petrol from England to France each day. The sheer size of the structure required the involvement of many other companies in manufacture of individual lengths. One of PLUTO's two pipeline styles was named HAIS—Hartley, Anglo-Iranian, Siemens.

== Post-war period ==
=== New owners ===
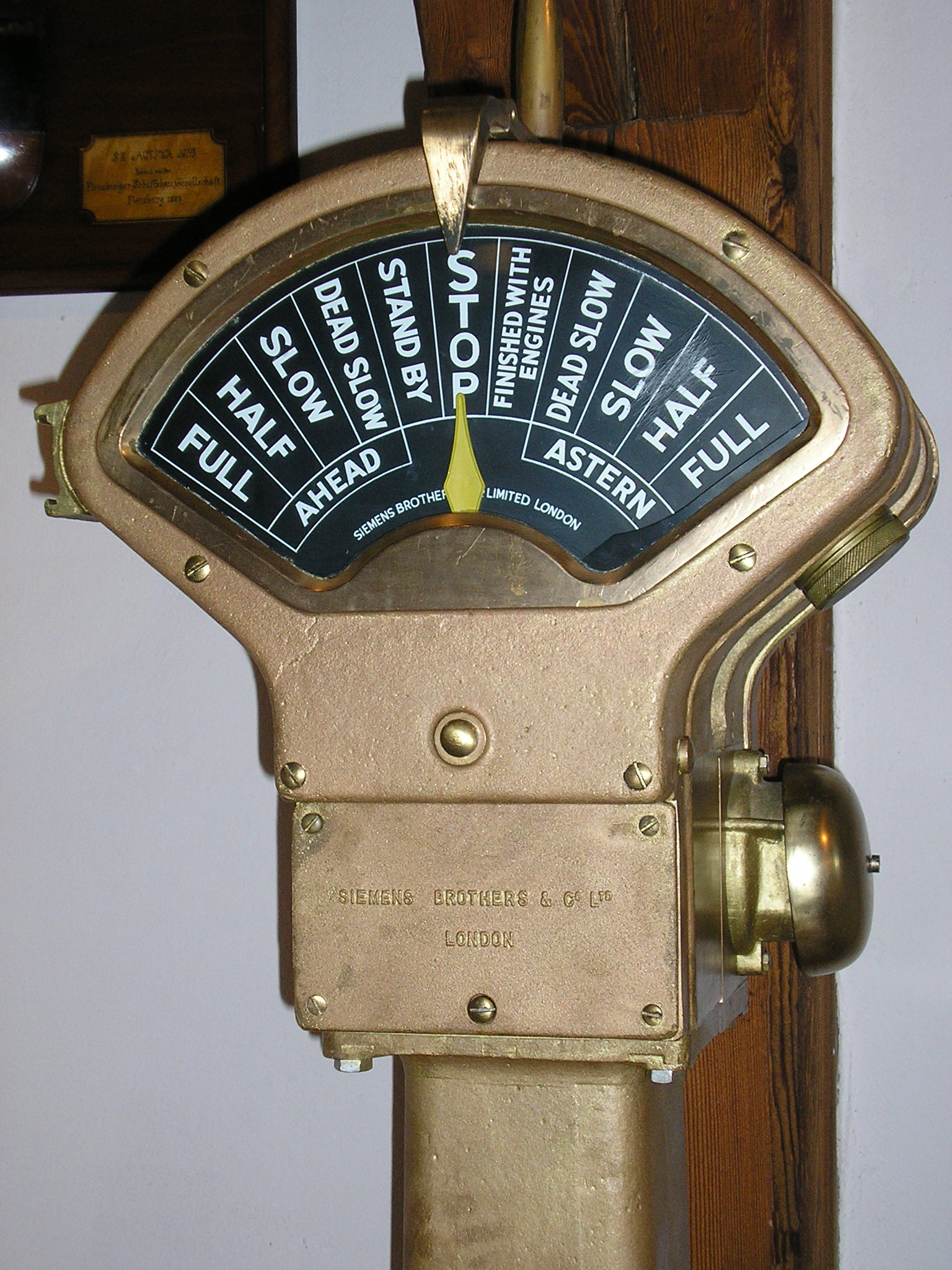
Ship's telegraph

- AEI, Associated Electrical Industries Limited, in 1951 purchased from the custodian of enemy property the formerly Siemens & Halske-owned 15% of Siemens Brothers capital issued to them in June 1929. It had been issued in respect of certain licensing arrangements with Siemens Brothers and agreements for technical exchange and in exchange for a holding of equal value in their company.

Associated Electrical Industries Limited offered to buy the rest of Siemens Brothers in December 1954 offering their own shares in exchange for Siemens Brothers shares. Their offer was accepted by more than 90% of shareholders and so it became unconditional on 25 January 1955.
- Siemens Edison Swan Limited 1957

- GEC, General Electric Company, in 1967 took over AEI.

=== Closure ===
Despite rationalisation and further investment, the layout and age of the Woolwich works stood in the way of new production methods. After the AEI take-over, the Woolwich factory principally produced Strowger telephone exchanges for the General Post Office. After these became more and more obsolete, GEC's chairman Sir Arnold Weinstock was unwilling to invest in modernisation of the Woolwich plant. Early in 1968 the Woolwich works, where at the time 6,000 were employed, closed. This happened one year after the closure of the Royal Ordnance Factory in the Royal Arsenal, by far the largest employer in Woolwich. Losing both the ordnance factory and the Siemens plant at roughly the same time caused large-scale unemployment in the area and decades of economic and social hardship.

== Legacy ==
=== Some Siemens Brothers Firsts ===
- Automatic trunk telephone exchange, 1914, King's College Hospital, London
- Short-wave marine radio, 1927, s.s. Carinthia
- (electrically operated) Train arrival indicator, 1934, Paddington Station, London
- Television outside broadcast, 1937 Coronation, made and laid the cable used
- Transatlantic telephone cable, 1956, 9/10ths of the cable, 4,200 nautical miles, cable was made by Submarine Cables

=== Industrial heritage ===
At the Woolwich site, which once covered thirty-five acres, several buildings testify of a rich industrial heritage. Several buildings were destroyed or severely damaged by bombs in World War II, including the oldest building of 1863-65. A range of two- and three-storey buildings from the 1870s, 80s and 90s stands on the north side of Bowater Road. The western section of 1871 and 1873 is largely derelict. The central section was rebuilt after war damage, the eastern section has been renovated. The latter sections are now part of London's largest complex of artists' studios, Thames-Side Studios. On the other side of Bowater Road several five-storey brick buildings of 1911, 1926 and 1942 have survived, along with a largely concrete building of 1937. Near the Thames Barrier is the 1946 marine radio school, a joint venture by Siemens Brothers with Metropolitan Vickers Electrical Co. Ltd., providing training in the use of radar and radio equipment.

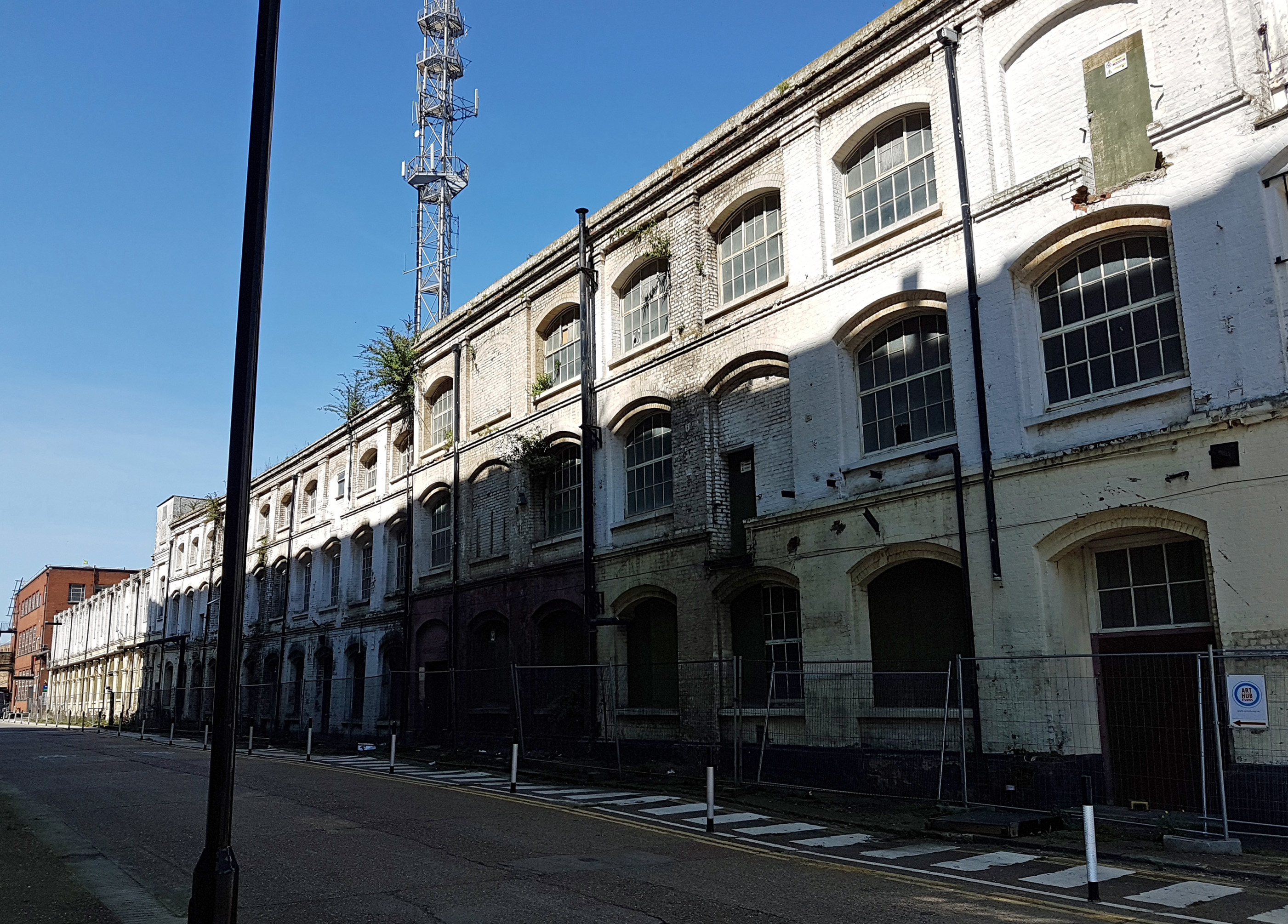
Oldest Woolwich buildings, 1871–73

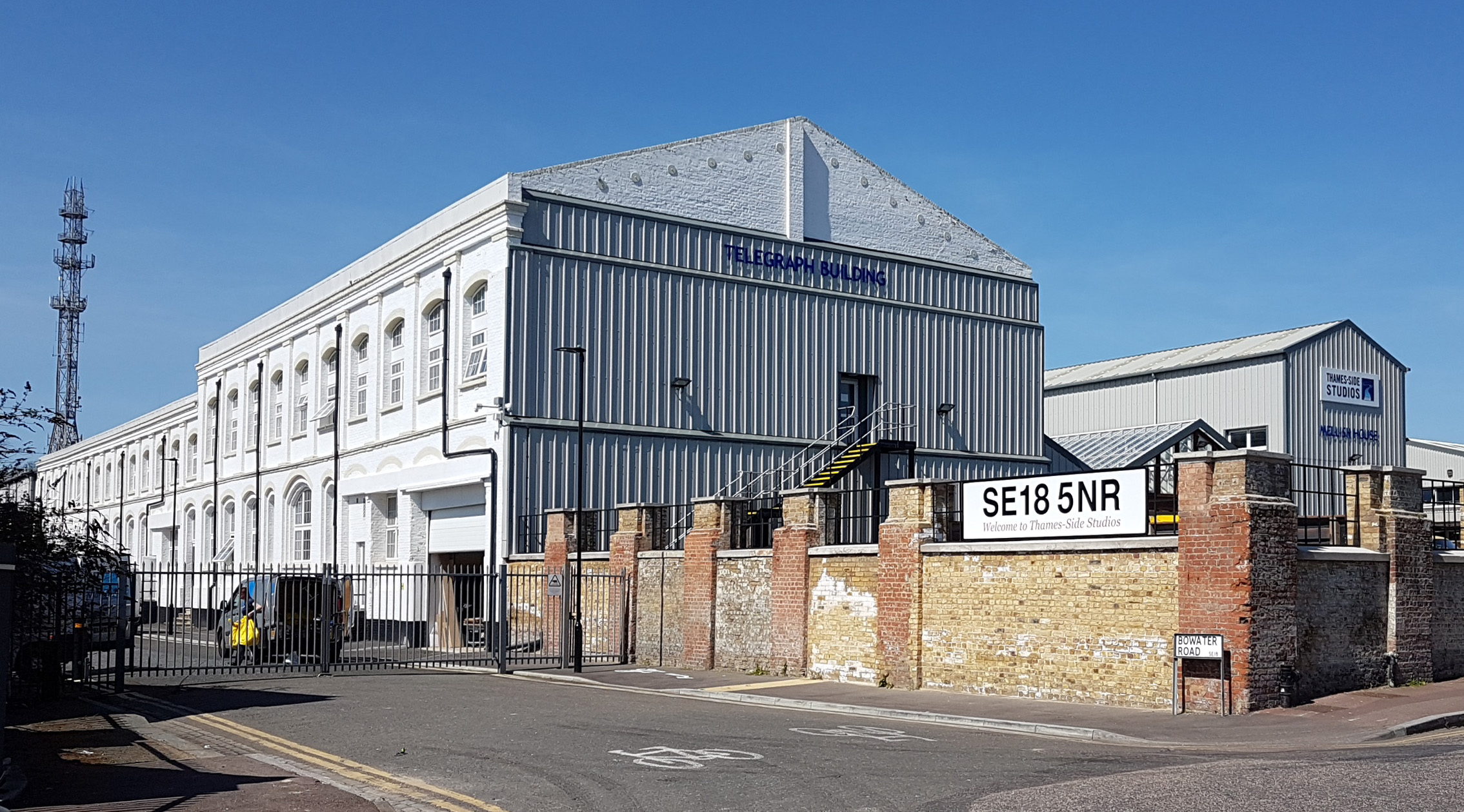
1890s range, now artists' studios

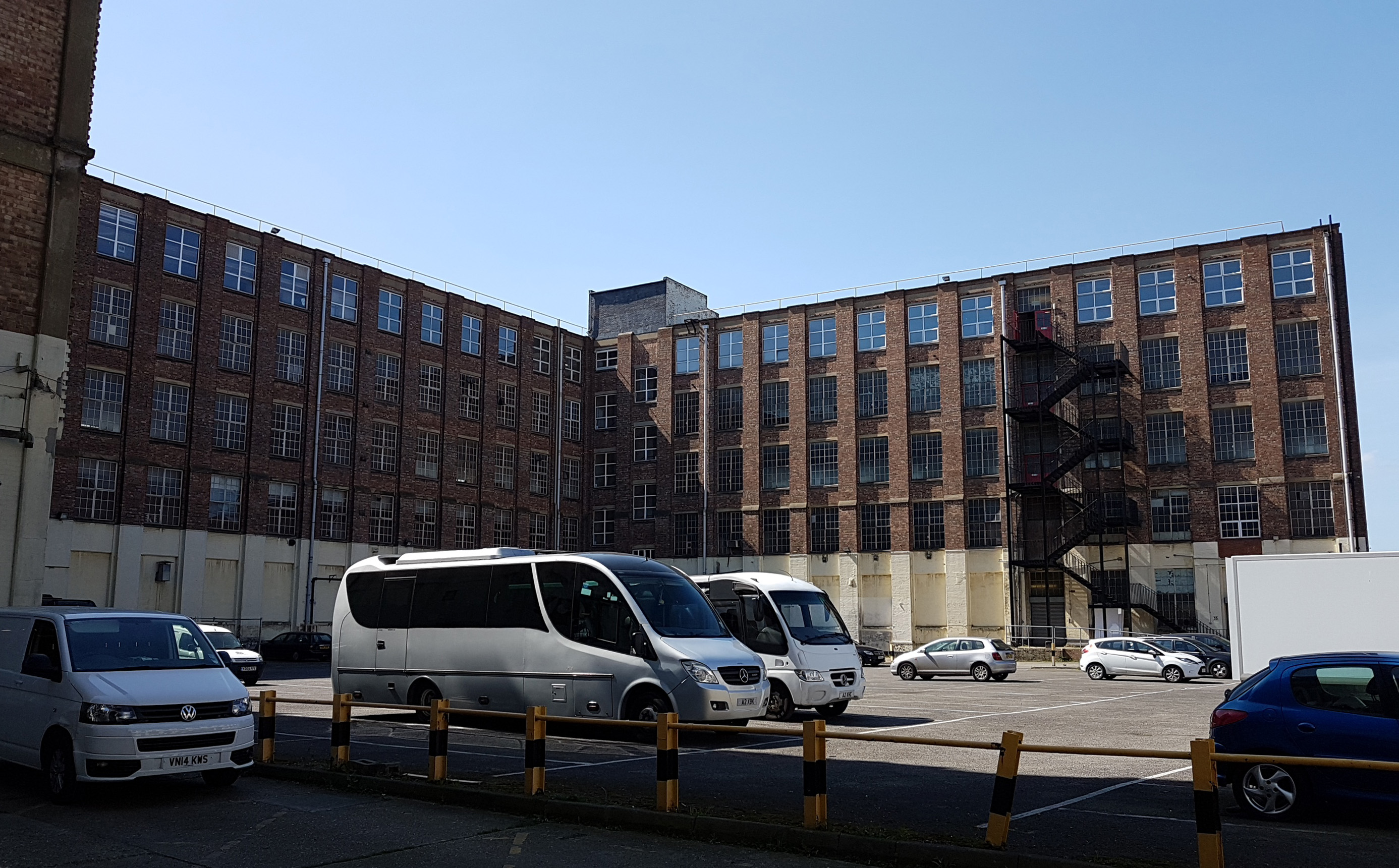
L-shaped building, 1911

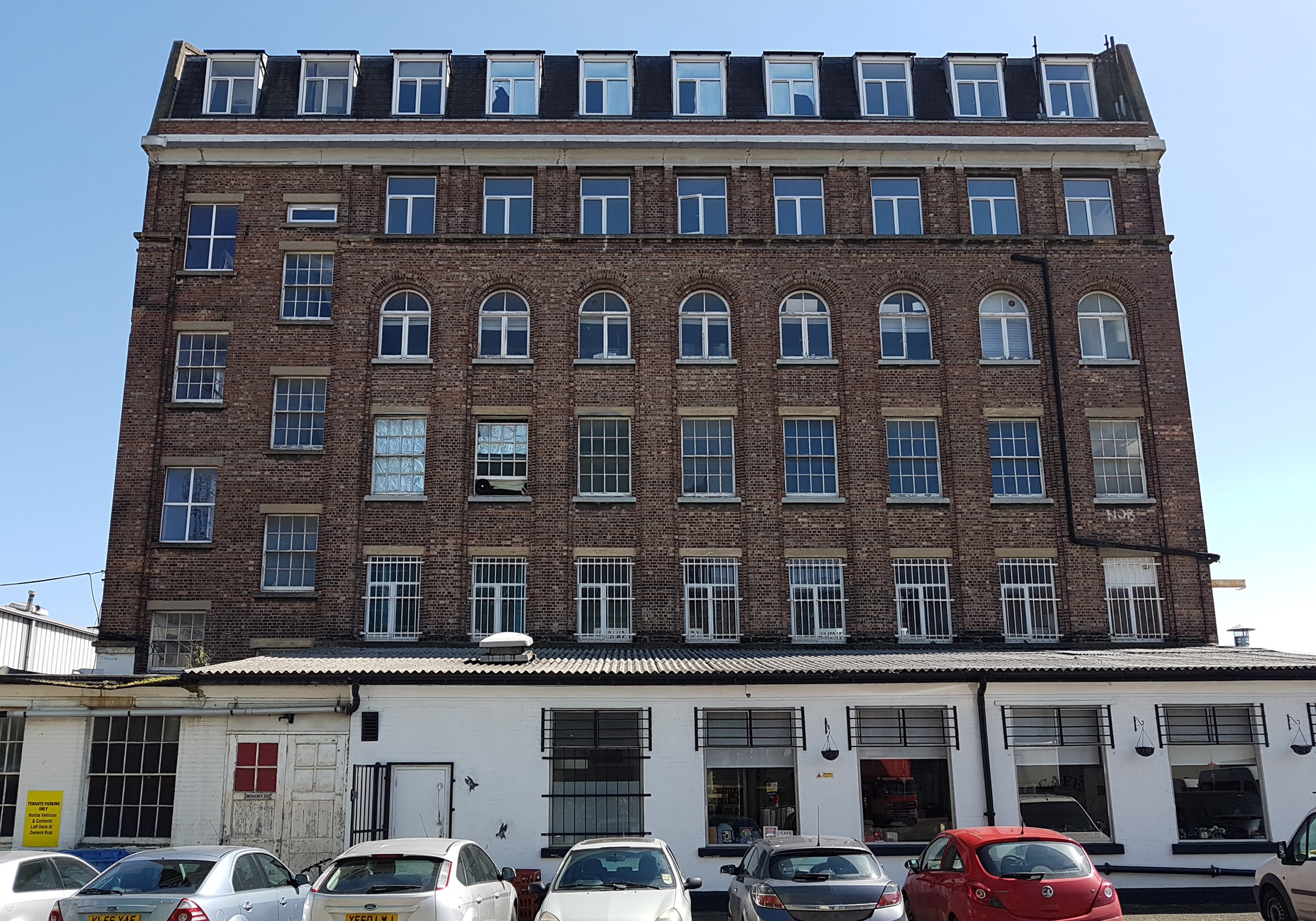
Main office, 1911

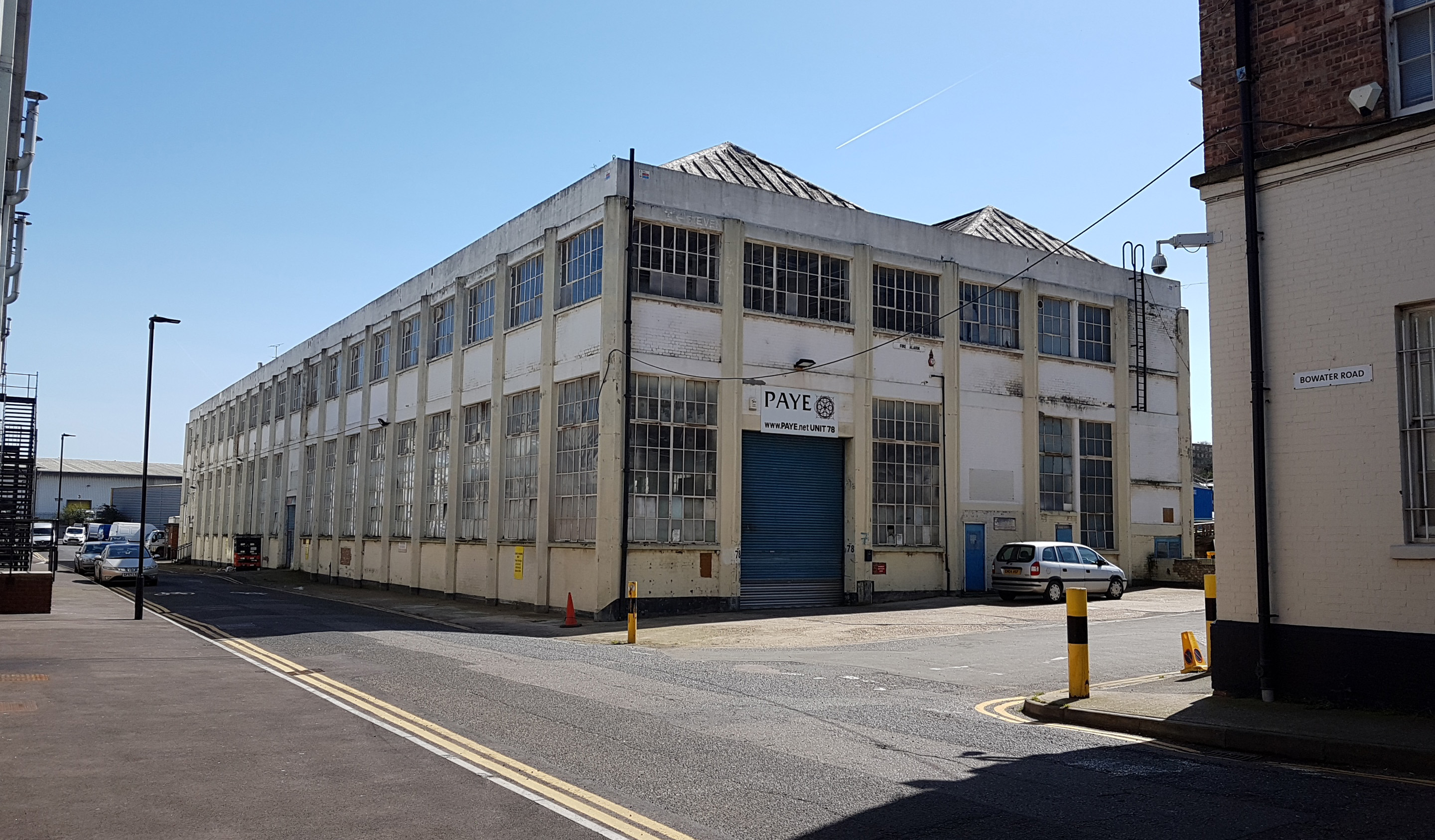
Cable shop, 1937

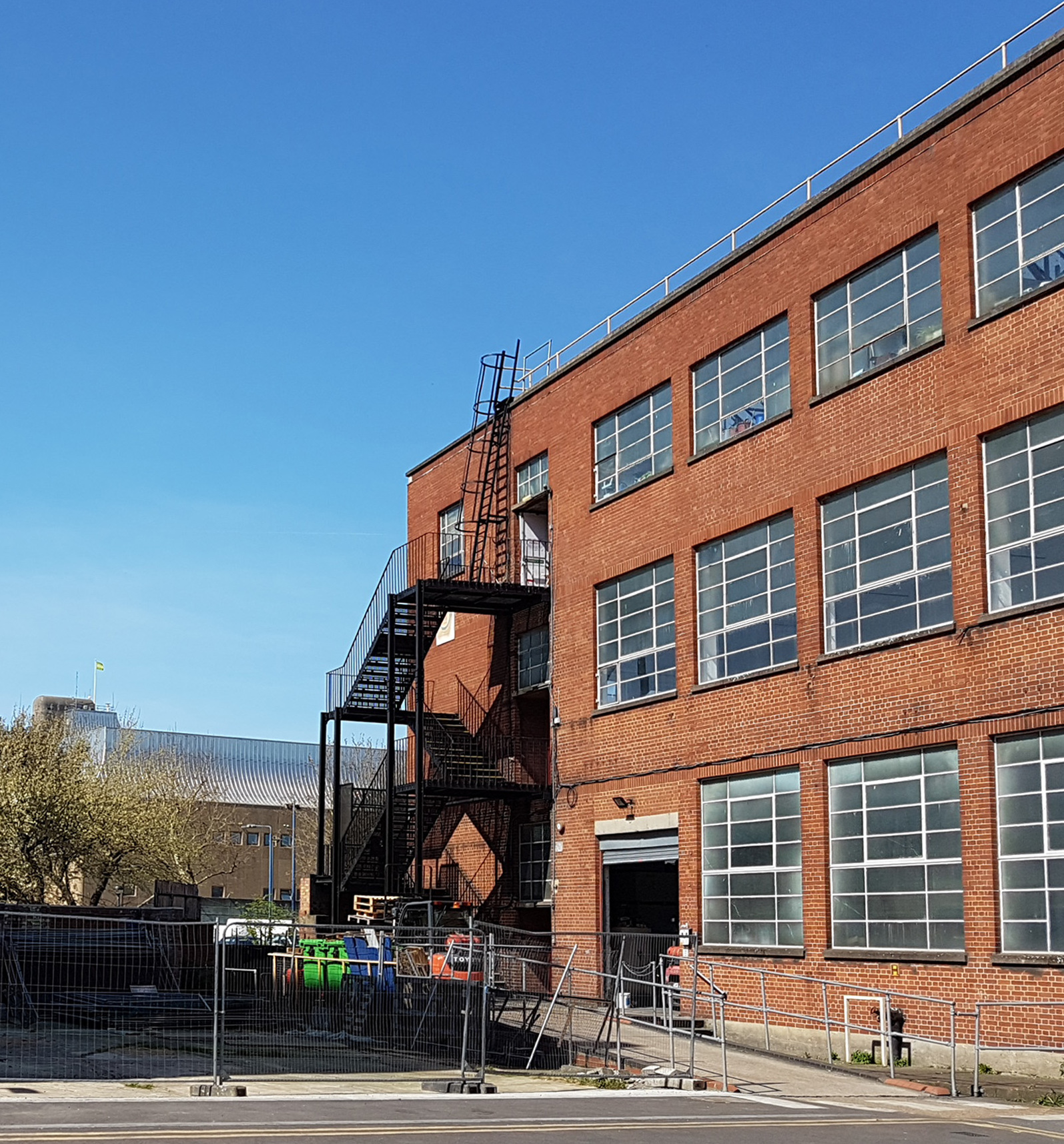
Marine radio school, 1947
