= Alexander Siemens =

German electrical engineer

- Born: 22 January 1847; Hanover, German Confederation
- Died: 16 February 1928 (aged 81); Milford-on-Sea, Hampshire
- Education: University of Berlin
- Spouse: Louisa Dodwell
- Children: Three daughters
- Parent(s): Gustav and Sophie Siemens
- Engineering career
- Discipline: Civil, Electrical,
- Institutions: Institution of Civil Engineers (president), Society of Telegraph Engineers and Electricians (founder member)
- Practice name: Siemens Brothers
- Projects: World's first public electricity supply (at Godalming)
- Awards: Iron Cross

Alexander Siemens (22 January 1847 – 16 February 1928) was a German electrical engineer.

Siemens was born in Hanover, then a kingdom within the German Confederation, to Gustav and Sophie Siemens of the Siemens family, an old family of Goslar which can be traced back to 1384. His father was a judge and a cousin of William Siemens the famous electrical engineer. He was educated in Hanover and moved to Woolwich, London in 1867 to work at the Siemens Brothers factory. He returned to the German Confederation in 1868 to study at the University of Berlin, interrupting his studies there to lay telegraph cables in the Middle East. These cables were to form part of the Indo-European Telegraph and much of the work was undertaken by Siemens Brothers.

Upon the annexation of Hanover by Prussia in 1866 following the Austro-Prussian War Siemens became a Prussian citizen and liable to conscription. He was conscripted in 1870 as a private to fight in the Franco-Prussian War where he was wounded at the Battle of Beaune-la-Rolande. It was for his actions in this battle where Prussian forces won a decisive victory over the numerically superior French army that he was awarded the Iron Cross. After demobilization in 1871 he returned to the family business in Woolwich and assisted with the building of furnaces for use in steel foundries and crematoria.

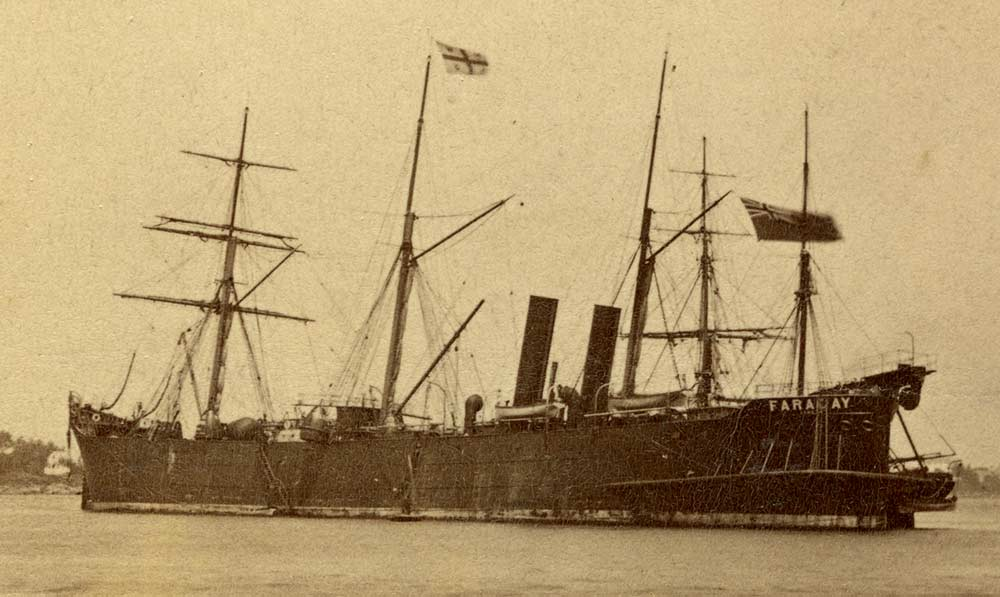
The CS Faraday which Siemens travelled on during 1875

In 1871 Siemens was a founder member of the Society of Telegraph Engineers and Electricians (which became the Institution of Electrical Engineers in 1889) and was president of the institution twice, in 1894 and in 1904. His first inaugural address was an analysis of the Electric Lighting Acts of 1882 and 1888, his second advocating a wider use of the metric system. In 1875, he sailed aboard the cable ship Faraday, laying several cables across the North Atlantic. In between voyages he built several furnaces for companies in the US and Canada. Returning to the UK in 1877 he became a British citizen through naturalization in 1878. He was appointed the manager of the electric lighting division of Siemens Brothers in 1879 and was involved in the manufacture of generators, arc lamps and cables for the electric industry.

In 1881 he married Louisa Dodwell with whom he had three daughters, one of whom, Mariana, married Bertram Hopkinson, son of the great electrical engineer John Hopkinson and himself a professor of engineering at Cambridge University. Later in 1881 Siemens Brothers took over a project to provide the world's first public electricity supply in Godalming, Surrey. This project was never a viable business but the company undertook it in order to gain more experience in the lighting industry.

Siemens had been a director of Siemens Brothers since it became a limited company in 1880 and was made managing director in 1889, a post he was to hold until a significant reorganization replaced him, though he remained on the board of directors until his retirement in 1918. He was appointed to be a British delegate to the International Electrical Congress in 1893 and to a similar congress in Paris in 1901. In the same year as the Paris congress he was appointed to the board of the new National Physical Laboratory in Teddington. He served as President of the Institution of Civil Engineers between November 1910 and November 1911.

In retirement he lived at Westover Hall, Milford-on-Sea, Hampshire, where he died, from heart failure, on 16 February 1928.

Professional and academic associations
Preceded by James Charles Inglis	President of the Institution of Civil Engineers; November 1910 – November 1911	Succeeded by William Unwin
