= AJAX furnace =

Modified open hearth furnace

The AJAX furnace was a modification of the tilting open hearth furnace that used blown oxygen to improve productivity. The process was used in the UK during the 1960s at a time of transition from open hearth to oxygen-based steelmaking.

== History and description ==
The AJAX process invented in 1957, and named after its originator, Albert Jackson. The process involved modifying an open hearth furnace to use oxygen instead of air. The use of oxygen in the open hearth negated the need for an external fuel source, as with Linz-Donawitz converters.

The furnaces were used at the United Steel Companies at the Appleby-Frodingham steelworks near Scunthorpe, Lincolnshire, England as an alternative to installing completely new oxygen based steelmaking plant. In operational practice at Appleby-Frodingham the design initially increased productivity by 38%, as well as reducing scrap requirement from 3.5 to 0.2 long hundredweight (178 to 10 kg) per 1 long ton (1,000 kg). Later productivity increases were from 70% to 100%, with conversion costs reduced to 68%. By 1962 five of the six open hearth furnaces at the plant had been converted. Conversion time of the open hearths to the oxygen-based process was around 28 days on average, with a stated capital cost of £180,000 each.

In 1966 the Appleby-Frodingham steelworks decided to replace the AJAX production with Linz-Donawitz converters.

== See also ==
- Kaldo converter
