= Carl Wilhelm Siemens =

German-British electrical engineer (1823–1883)

Sir Charles William Siemens
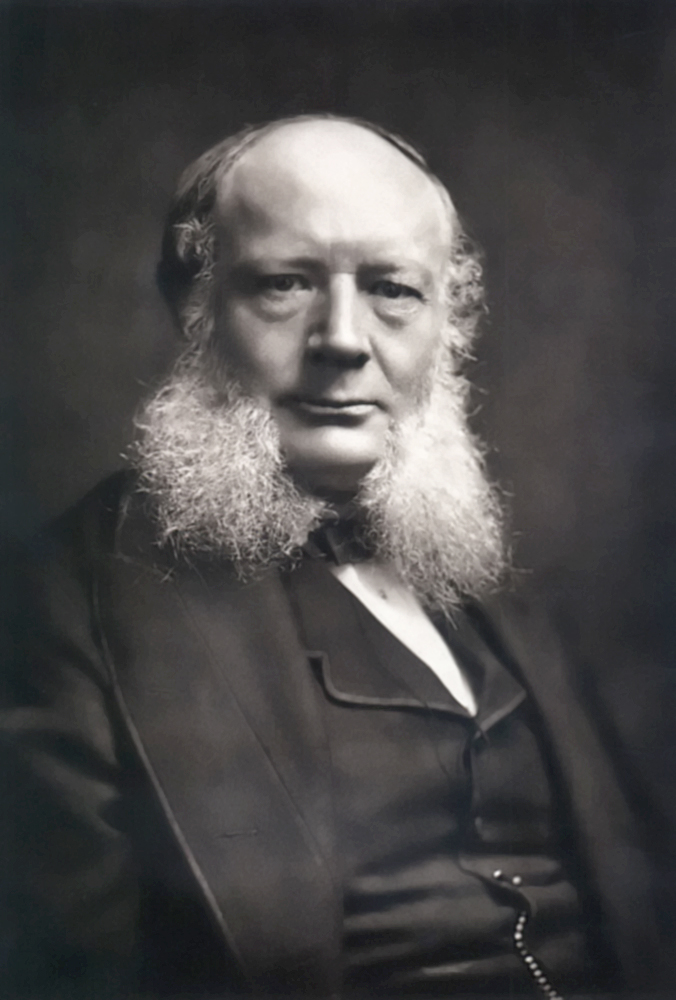
- Carl Wilhelm Siemens
- Born: 4 April 1823; Lenthe, Kingdom of Hanover (now Gehrden, Lower Saxony)
- Died: 19 November 1883 (aged 60); London
- Occupations: Electrical engineer, businessman
- Known for: Siemens cycle; Siemens-Martin process; Regenerative cooling; Resistance thermometer; Underground coal gasification
- Spouse: Anne Gordon
- Relatives: Ernst Werner von Siemens; Carl Heinrich von Siemens; Alexander Siemens
- Awards: Bessemer Gold Medal (1875); Albert Medal (1874); Bakerian Medal (1871); FRS (1862)

Sir Carl Wilhelm Siemens (4 April 1823 – 19 November 1883), anglicised to Charles William Siemens, was a German-British electrical engineer and businessman. He was born on April 4, 1823, in the Kingdom of Hanover and died on 19 November 1883 at the age of 60 years in London.

He received the Albert Medal in 1874, the Royal Society Bakeries Medal in 1871, and was elected Fellow of the Royal Society in 1862. He invented the regenerative furnace which enabled a process that came to be known as the Siemens-Martin process.

== Early life and education ==
In the autumn of 1838 when William was fifteen years old, he began his studies to become an engineer. He attended a highly respected School of Trade and Commerce, the Gewerbe-Schule Magdeburg. William had a particularly close relationship with his eldest brother; Ernst Werner Siemens had decided to teach William mathematics so that he could learn English at school in its place. This programme helped them both and William's knowledge of English proved an incalculable advantage to them both. He went on to pass his examination easily. Less than a year later, their mother died and their father soon afterwards in 1840.

Once William had completed his course at the Magdeburg school he went on to the University of Göttingen where he attended lectures on physical geography and technology, high mathematics, theoretical chemistry and practical chemistry and physics. He was also able for a short time to work with Wilhelm Weber, the renowned scientist and inventor, in his Magnetic Observatory.

William was nearly nineteen when he left university to become an apprentice engineer. He also found time for more artistic pursuits such as taking dancing lessons and even painting a landscape of Nordhausen for the wife of the factory manager. His progress in the engineering factory was so rapid that his two-year apprenticeship was cut down to one.

Due to the education of the younger members of the family becoming a financial worry, on 10 March 1843, Carl Wilhelm Siemens left for London. He was acting as an agent for his brother Werner, and he hoped to earn enough money by selling a patent in England to help support and educate his many brothers and sisters. He felt a keen desire to see England and the journey cost him £1. William had already shown himself to be an enthusiastic businessman, having financed his trip by selling an invention of his brother's, an improvement to the gold and silver plating process, to George Richards Elkington. He was well aware, as he wrote to Werner, that his visit might achieve nothing, but if all went well he intended to remain. This indeed proved to be the case.

== Career ==
Siemens had been trained as a mechanical engineer, and his most important work at this early stage was non-electrical; the greatest achievement of his life, the regenerative furnace. Though in 1847 he published a paper in Liebig's Annalen der Chemie on the 'Mercaptan of Selenium,' his mind was busy with the new ideas upon the nature of heat which were promulgated by Carnot, Clapeyron, Joule, Clausius, Mayer, Thomson, and Rankine. He discarded the older notions of heat as a substance, and accepted it as a form of energy. Working on this new line of thought, which gave him an advantage over other inventors of his time, he made his first attempt to economise heat, by constructing, in 1847, at the factory of John Hick, of Bolton, an engine of four horse-power, having a condenser provided with regenerators, and using superheated steam.

Two years later he continued his experiments at the works of Messrs. Fox, Henderson, and Co., of Smethwick, near Birmingham, who had taken the matter in hand. The use of superheated steam was attended with many practical difficulties, and the invention was not entirely successful; nevertheless, the Society of Arts, in 1850, acknowledged the value of the principle, by awarding Siemens a gold medal for his regenerative condenser.

In 1850 he established the London sales office of Siemens & Halske, the engineering company producing telegraphs, which his brother Werner had founded in 1847 at Berlin. He started selling such devices to the wire rope producer R. S. Newall and Company in Dundee, of which his friend (and uncle of his later wife) Lewis Gordon was the co-owner. Newall & Co. also outsourced test jobs for cables to Siemens and such enabled the new company to enter the ocean cable-laying business. The branch office became Siemens Brothers in 1858. In the 1850s, the company was involved in building long distance telegraph networks in Russia. In 1855, a company branch headed by another brother, Carl Heinrich von Siemens, opened in St Petersburg, Russia. By 1863, Sir William had his own cable factory built at Charlton, London. In 1867, Siemens completed the monumental Indo-European (Calcutta to London) telegraph line.

In 1859 William Siemens devoted a great part of his time to electrical invention and research; and the number of telegraph apparatus of all sorts – telegraph cables, land lines, and their accessories – which have emanated from the Siemens Telegraph Works (at Charlton, SE London) has been remarkable. In 1872 Sir William Siemens became the first president of the Society of Telegraph Engineers which became the Institution of Electrical Engineers, the forerunner of the Institution of Engineering and Technology

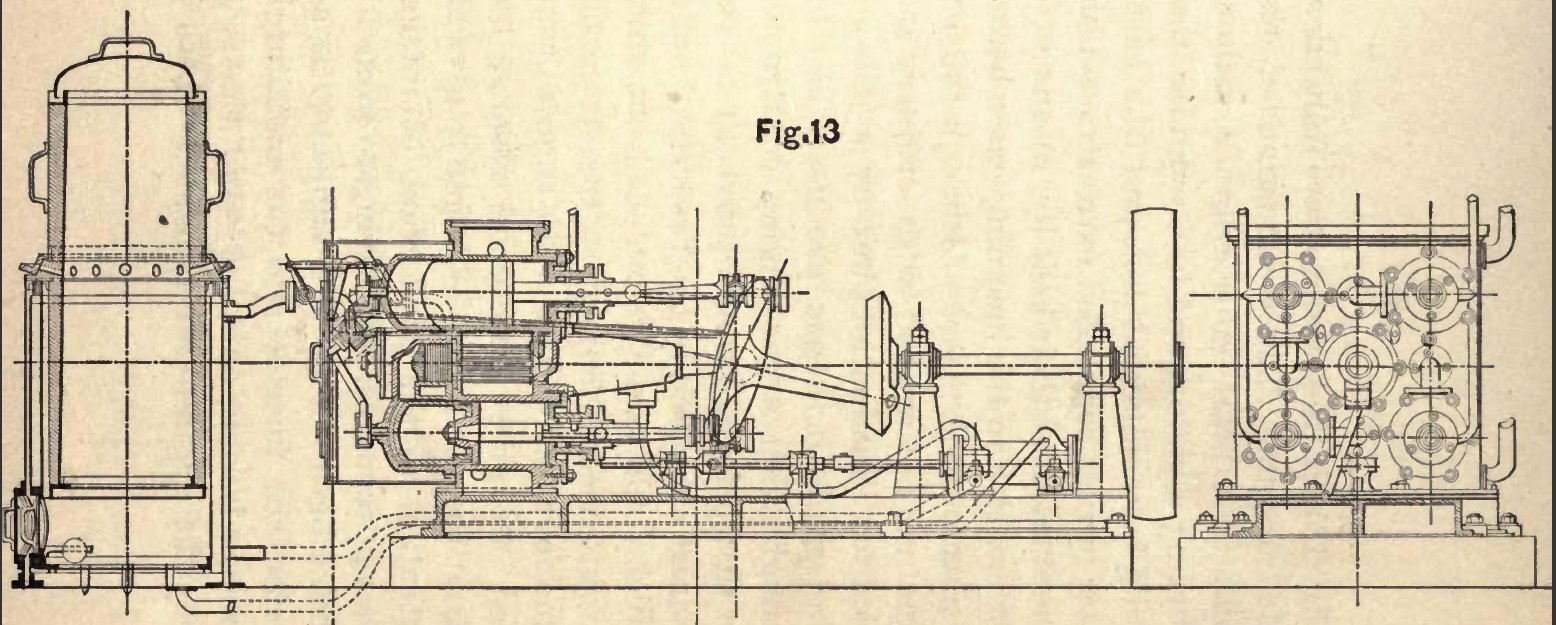
The 4-cylinder experimental gas engine subject of Siemens patent (image taken from Theory of the Gas Engine by Dugald Clerk in 1882)

In 1860 William Siemens constructed a remarkable gas engine (the same year the very first commercial engine was produced by Lenoir). It did not get beyond the experimental stage, though its principle of operation (described in Siemens British patent 2074 of 1860, and by Siemens in The Theory of the Gas Engine) appears to be similar to the commercially successful Brayton engine of 1872. In the discussion section of The Theory of the Gas Engine Siemens discloses that

The engine promised to give very good results, but about the same time he began to give his attention to the production of intense heat in furnaces, and having to make his choice between the two subjects, he selected the furnace and the metallurgic process leading out of it; and that was why the engine had remained where it was for so long a time.

Siemens was also responsible for the hot tube ignition system used on many of the early gas engines.

In June 1862 he was elected a Fellow of the Royal Society and in 1871 delivered their Bakerian Lecture.

As a member of the circumnavigation committee preparing the oceanographic expedition of HMS Challenger, Siemens was commissioned in 1871 to develop an electric thermometer to measure the temperature of the ocean at different depths.

The regenerative furnace is the greatest single invention of Charles William Siemens. Siemens' regenerative principles were applied by French engineer Pierre-Émile Martin in 1865 to create the Siemens-Martin process for open-hearth furnaces, revolutionising industrial steel manufacturing. The electric pyrometer, which is perhaps the most elegant and original of all William Siemens' inventions, is also the link which connects his electrical with his metallurgical researches. Siemens pursued two major themes in his inventive efforts, one based upon the science of heat, the other based upon the science of electricity; and the electric thermometer was, as it were, a delicate cross-coupling which connected both.

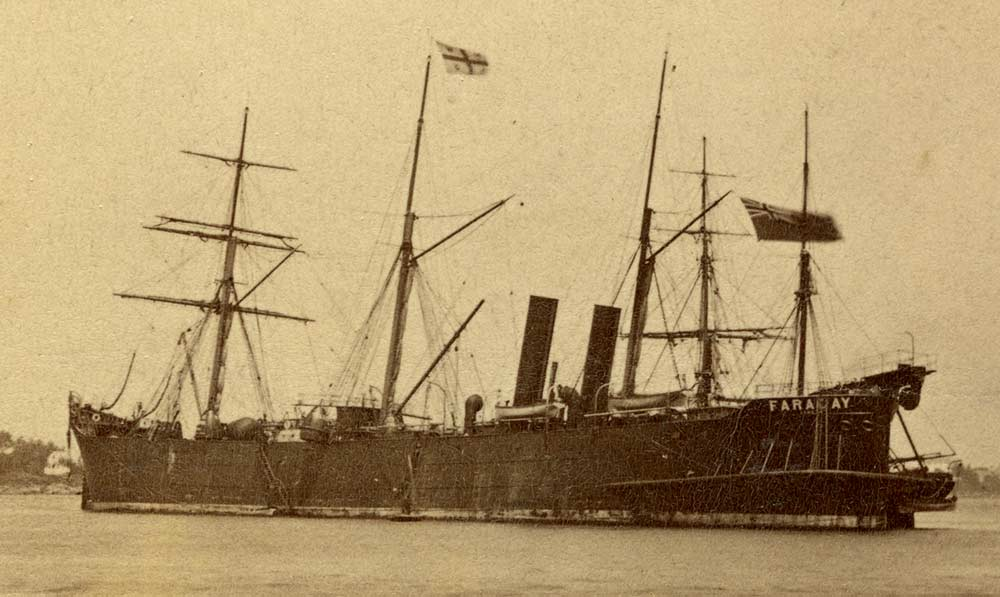
CS Faraday

In 1874 he had a special cable ship built, according to his design, for Siemens Brothers, the CS Faraday. In 1881, a Siemens AC Alternator driven by a watermill was used to power the world's first electric street lighting in the town of Godalming, United Kingdom.

He was elected a member to the American Philosophical Society in 1877. He was elected an honorary member of the American Society of Mechanical Engineers in 1882, which noted his work on the regenerative gas furnace and the production of steel.

== See also ==
- Turboexpander

Professional and academic associations
Preceded by John Ramsbottom	President of the Institution of Mechanical Engineers; 1872–1873	Succeeded by Sir Frederick Bramwell
