= Open-hearth furnace =

Industrial furnace for steelmaking

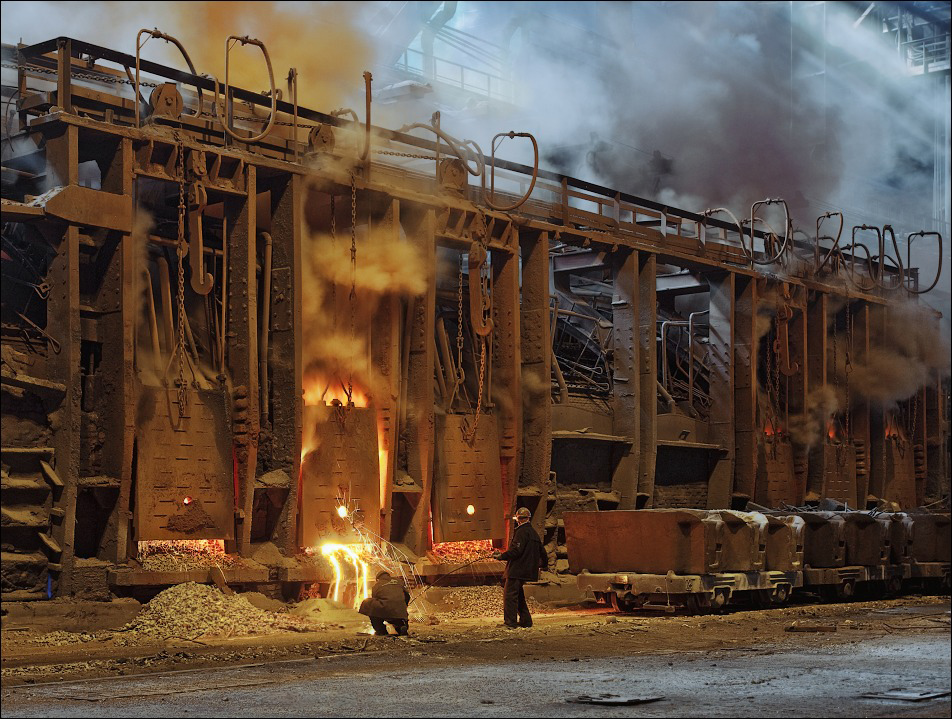
Open hearth furnace workers at the Zaporizhstal steel mill in Ukraine taking a steel sample, c. 2012

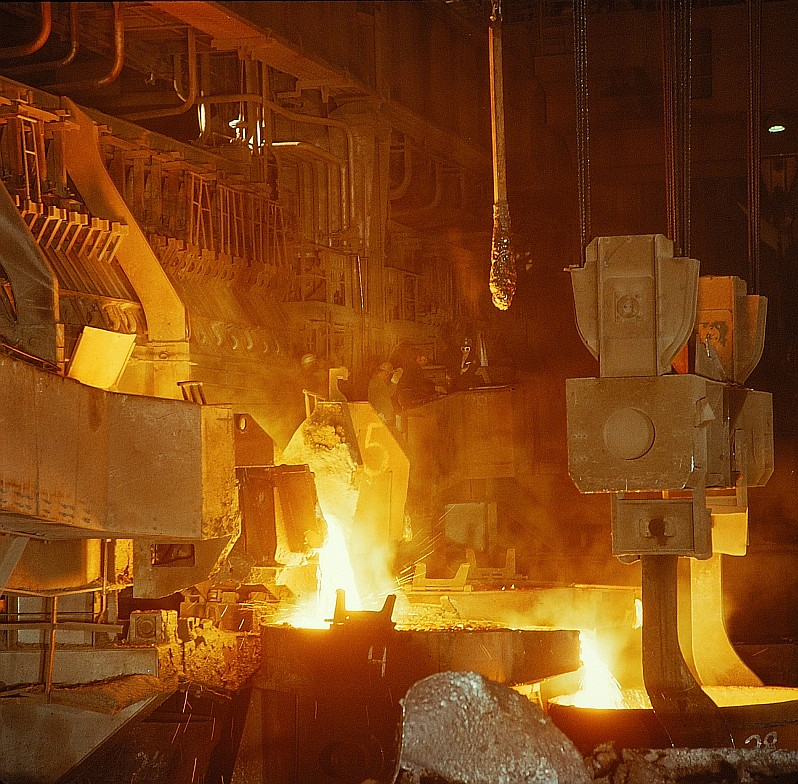
Tapping open-hearth furnace, VEB Rohrkombinat Riesa, East Germany, 1982

An open-hearth furnace is any of several kinds of industrial furnace in which excess carbon and other impurities are burnt out of pig iron to produce steel. Because steel is difficult to manufacture owing to its high melting point, normal fuels and furnaces were insufficient for mass production of steel, and the open-hearth type of furnace was one of several technologies developed in the nineteenth century to overcome this difficulty. Compared with the Bessemer process, which it displaced, its main advantages were that it did not embrittle the steel from excessive nitrogen exposure, was easier to control, and permitted the melting and refining of large amounts of scrap iron and steel.

The open-hearth furnace was first developed by German/British engineer Carl Wilhelm Siemens. In 1865, the French engineer Pierre-Émile Martin took out a licence from Siemens and first applied his regenerative furnace for making steel. Their process was known as the Siemens–Martin process or Martin–Siemens process, and the furnace as an "open-hearth" furnace. Most open hearth furnaces were shut down by the early 1990s, not least because of their slow operation, being replaced by the basic oxygen furnace or electric arc furnace.

Whereas the earliest example of open-hearth steelmaking is found about 2000 years ago in the culture of the Haya people, in present day Tanzania, and in Europe in the Catalan forge, invented in Spain in the 8th century, it is usual to confine the term to certain 19th-century and later steelmaking processes, thus excluding bloomeries (including the Catalan forge), finery forges, and puddling furnaces from its application.

== Open-hearth process ==
The open-hearth process is a batch process and a batch is called a "heat". The furnace is first inspected for possible damage. Once it is ready or repaired, it is charged with light scrap, such as sheet metal, shredded vehicles or waste metal. The furnace is heated using burning gas. Once the charge has melted, heavy scrap, such as building, construction or steel milling scrap is added, together with pig iron from blast furnaces. Once all the steel has melted, slag-forming agents such as limestone are added. Atmospheric oxygen in contact with molten pig iron directly oxidizes excess carbon it contains to form carbon monoxide (CO). Additionally, Fe(II) present in iron(II) oxide (FeO) and other impurities also contribute to decarburize the pig iron by oxidizing carbon into CO and simultaneously reducing Fe(II) into metallic Fe. The formed carbon monoxide (CO) is flushed away in the fumes, while steel is formed. To increase the oxidizing power of the "heat", more iron oxide ore can be added.

The process is far slower than that of the Bessemer converter and thus easier to control and sample for quality assessment. Preparing a heat usually takes eight to eight and a half hours, and longer to finish the conversion into steel. As the process is slow, it is not necessary to burn all the carbon away as in the Bessemer process, but the process can be terminated at any given point when the desired carbon content has been achieved.

The furnace is tapped in the same way a blast furnace is tapped; a hole is drilled in the side of the hearth and the raw steel flows out. Once all the steel has been tapped, the slag is skimmed away. The raw steel may be cast into ingots, a process called teeming, or it may be used in continuous casting in the rolling mill.

The regenerators are the distinctive feature of the furnace and consist of fire-brick flues filled with bricks set on edge and arranged in such a way as to have a great number of small passages between them. The bricks absorb most of the heat from the outgoing waste gases and return it later to the incoming cold gases for combustion.

== History ==
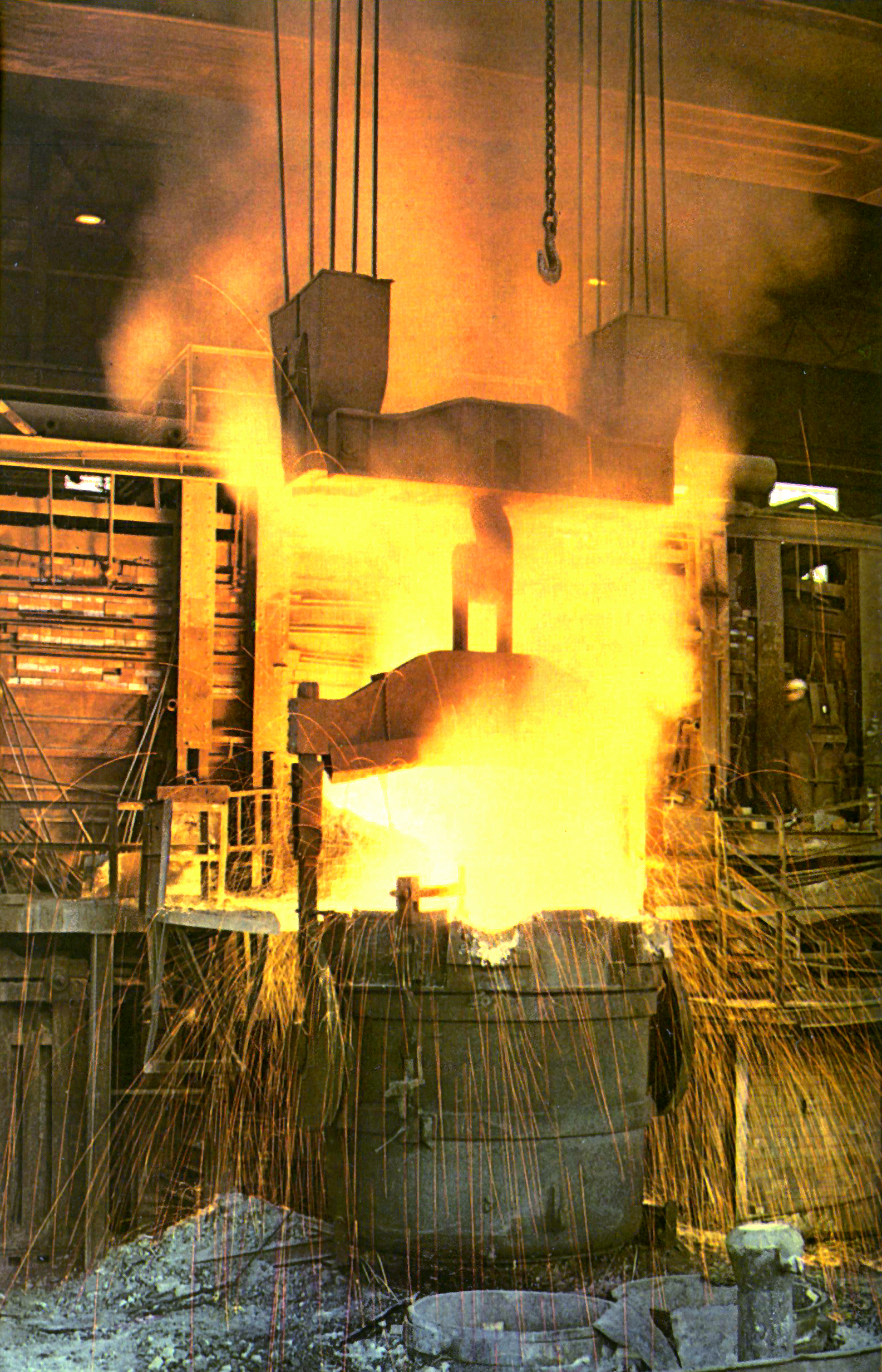
Tapping open hearth furnace, Fagersta steelmill, Sweden, 1967.

Carl Wilhelm Siemens developed the Siemens regenerative furnace in the 1850s, and claimed in 1857 to be recovering enough heat to save 70–80% of the fuel. This furnace operates at a high temperature by using regenerative preheating of fuel and air for combustion. In regenerative preheating, the exhaust gases from the furnace are pumped into a chamber containing bricks, where heat is transferred from the gases to the bricks. The flow of the furnace is then reversed so that fuel and air pass through the chamber and are heated by the bricks. Through this method, an open-hearth furnace can reach temperatures high enough to melt steel, but Siemens did not initially use it for that.

In 1865, the French engineer Pierre-Émile Martin took out a license from Siemens and first applied his regenerative furnace for making steel. The most appealing characteristic of the Siemens regenerative furnace is the rapid production of large quantities of basic steel, used for example to construct high-rise buildings. The usual size of furnaces is 50 to 100 tons, but for some special processes they may have a capacity of 250 or even 500 tons.

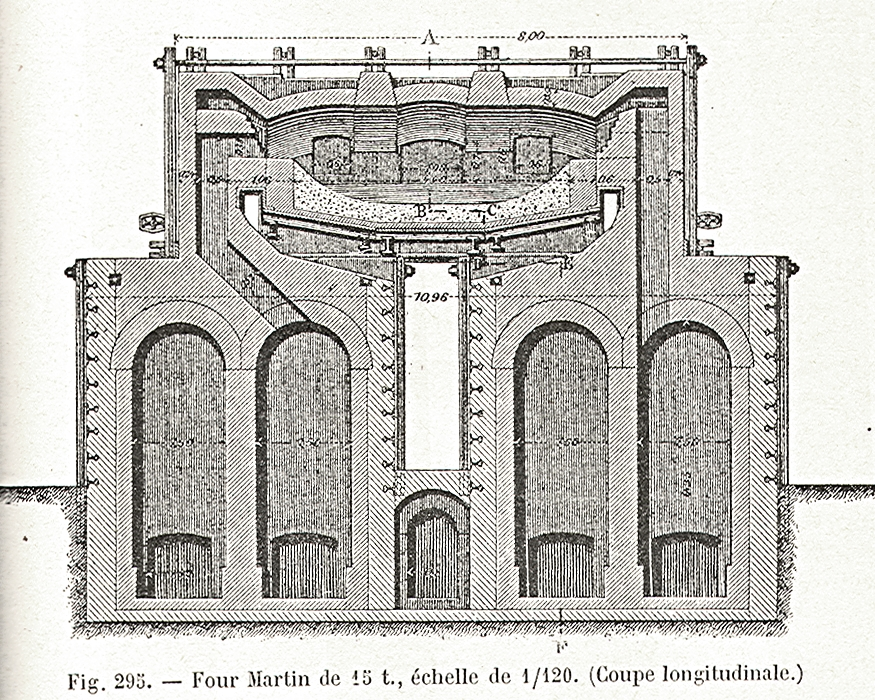
Siemens furnace from 1895.

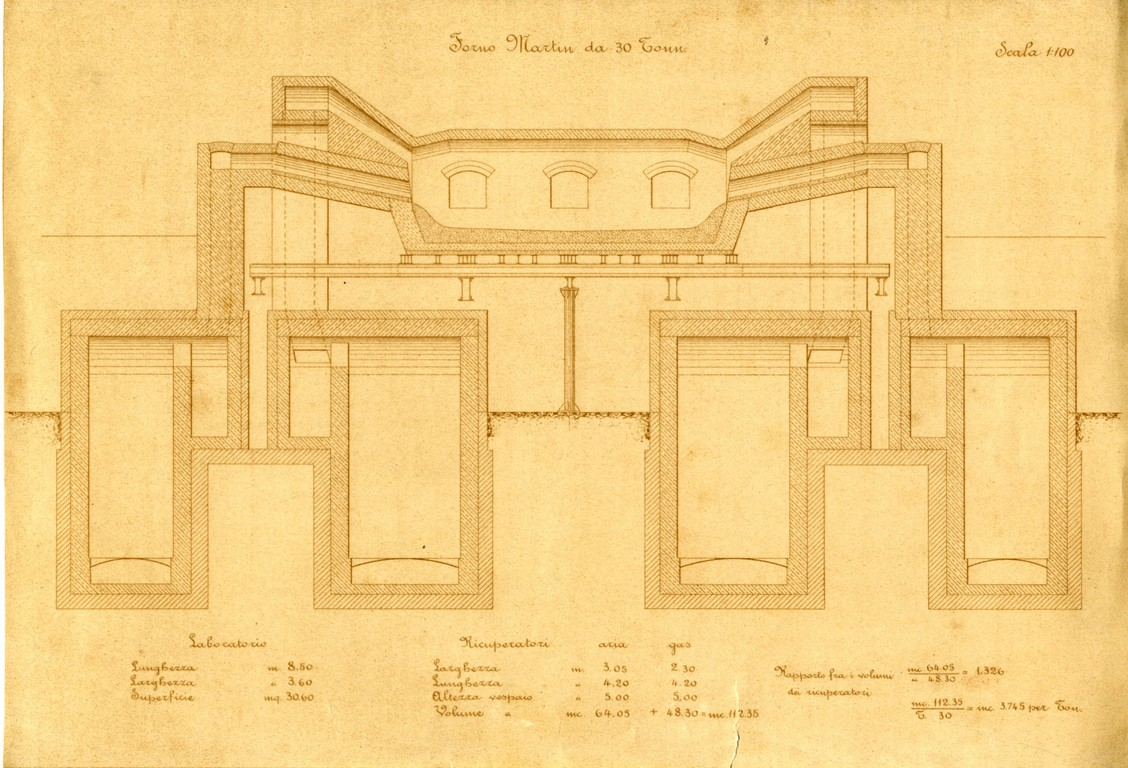
30-ton Siemens–Martin furnace, section, 1917.

Evolution of the size of open-hearth furnaces.

The Siemens–Martin process complemented rather than replaced the Bessemer process. It is slower and thus easier to control, allowing production of better product. It also permits the melting and refining of large amounts of scrap steel, further lowering steel production costs and recycling an otherwise troublesome waste material. One of its important drawbacks is that melting and refining a charge takes several hours. This was an advantage in the early 20th century, as it gave plant chemists time to analyze the steel and decide how much longer to refine it. But by about 1975 electronic instruments such as atomic absorption spectrophotometers had made analysis of the steel much easier and faster. The work environment around an open-hearth furnace is said to be extremely dangerous, although that may be even more true of the environment around a basic oxygen or electric arc furnace.

On the one hand, the process achieves lesser economies of scale than the Bessemer, so its steel was costlier in former's heyday, but on the other, it was more suitable for countries which couldn't produce lots of steel anyway due to limitations of natural resources.

Russian engineers invented the twin-hearth furnace in the mid-20th century. It has two melting pools separated by a brick wall, and no regenerator chambers. Instead the furnace has direct burners and oxygen lances at the ceiling of the furnace. The idea is to process two heats simultaneously, but in different phases, e.g. when one is being charged, the other is being decarburized. The idea is to burn away excess carbon and impurities with oxygen blast instead of free flame formation. All reactions which occur are exothermic, so the burners have only an auxiliary role. This is similar as the AJAX furnace, which also uses oxygen blow instead of free flame formation and regenerator chambers.

=== Decline and current operations ===
Basic oxygen steelmaking eventually replaced the open-hearth furnace. It rapidly superseded both the Bessemer and Siemens–Martin processes in western Europe from the 1950s and in eastern Europe by the 1980s. Open-hearth steelmaking had superseded the Bessemer process in UK by 1900, but elsewhere in Europe, especially in Germany, the Bessemer and Thomas processes were used until the late 1960s when they were superseded by basic oxygen steelmaking. The last open-hearth furnace in former East Germany was stopped in 1993. In the US, steel production using the Bessemer process ended in 1968 and the open-hearth furnaces had stopped by 1992. In Hunedoara steel works, Romania the last 420-tonne capacity open-hearth furnace was shut down on 12 June 1999 and demolished and scrapped between 2001 and 2003, but the eight smokestacks of the furnaces remained until February 2011. The last open-hearth shop in China was shut down in 2001. The process in the form of Twin Hearth Furnace was in use in India's Steel Authority of India Bhilai Steel Plant and some parts of Ukraine. Russia retired its last hearth furnace in March 2018, and was considering preserving it as a museum artifact. India's SAIL shut it down in April 2020 with the advent of COVID-19 because of nonavailability of manpower to run the labor intensive process.

As of 2024, the largest steel mill in the world that still produces steel using open-hearth furnaces is the Zaporizhstal steel mill in central Ukraine, which has seven 500-ton capacity OHFs and one twin-hearth furnace as well as four blast furnaces. The availability of cheap fuel oil in large quantities, as well as the ongoing invasion, largely contribute to their profitability despite the slow process. The high cost of upgrading to new furnace technologies is prohibitive.

== See also ==
- Bessemer process
- Cementation (metallurgy)
- Crucible steel § Methods of crucible steel production
- AJAX furnace, oxygen based open hearth process
