= Faraday Building, Manchester =

University building in Manchester, England

Faraday Building
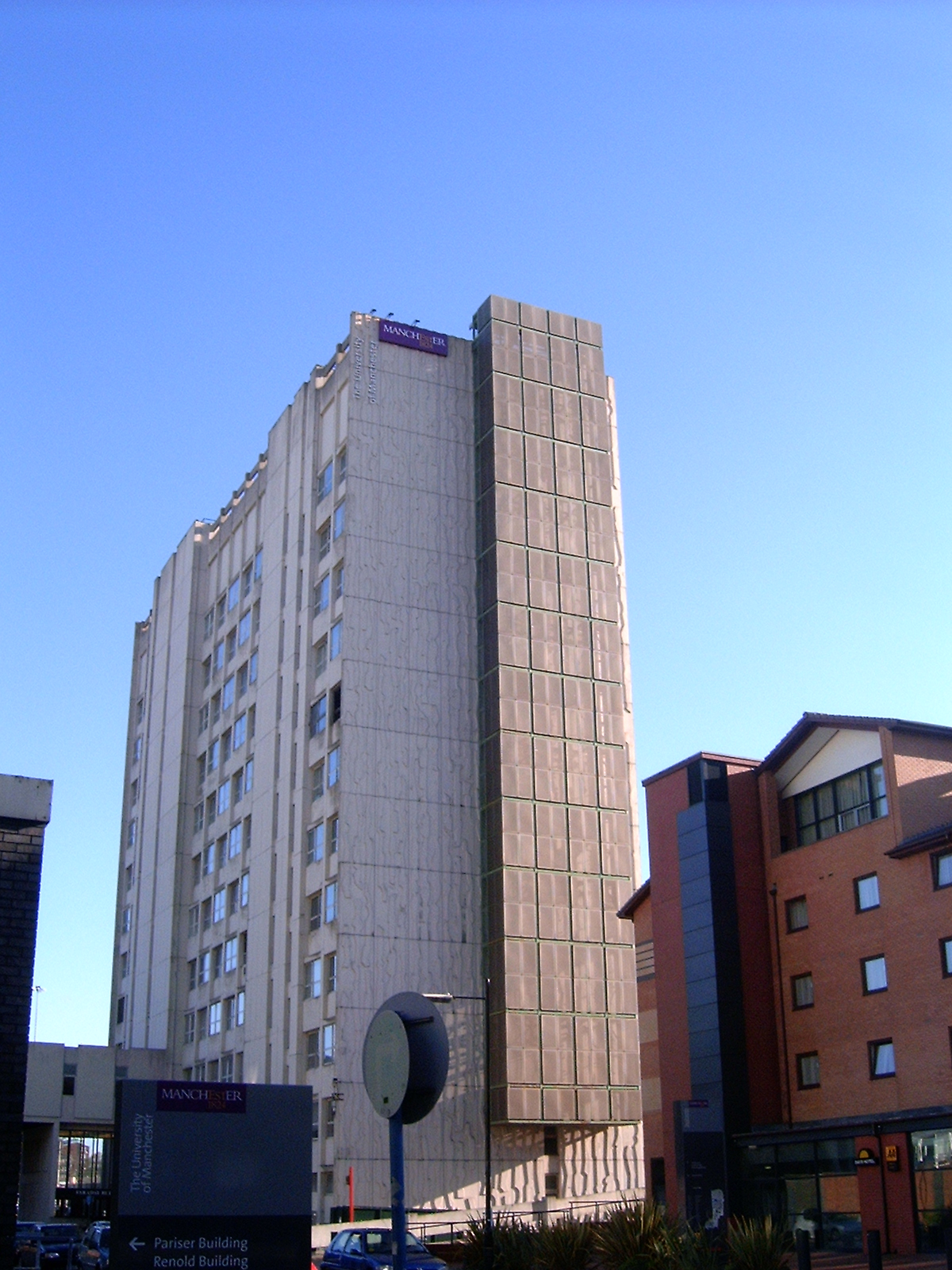

General information
- Type: Academic
- Location: Manchester
- Coordinates: 53.4735°N 2.2341°W
- Completed: 1967
- Owner: University of Manchester

Design and construction
- Architect(s): Harry Fairhurst
- Architecture firm: H.S. Fairhust & Son

The Faraday Building is a university building in central Manchester. It is part of the campus of the former University of Manchester Institute of Science and Technology.

The Faraday Building's architect was Harry Fairhurst, of the long-established Manchester firm of H.S. Fairhust & Son. It was constructed in 1967 by J. Gerrard & Sons.

The building housed, until mid-to-late 2007, part of the University of Manchester School of Chemistry. The School of Chemistry is now located mainly at the Chemistry Building on Brunswick Street, however a significant number of former Faraday-based academics researching biologically related chemistry are now based in the nearby Manchester Interdisciplinary Biocentre.

Appropriately, given its chemistry roots, the building housed a mural called The Alchemist's Elements (1967) by Hans Tisdall.

As part of the closure of the North Campus, the building was closed in 2015, and partially demolished in 2016.
