= Faraday Prize (disambiguation) =

The Faraday Prize, named after British scientist Michael Faraday, can refer to:

- the Faraday Lectureship Prize of the Royal Society of Chemistry (previously of the Chemical Society), established 1869, for "exceptional contributions to physical or theoretical chemistry"
- the Faraday Medal of the Institution of Engineering and Technology (previously of the Institution of Electrical Engineers), established 1922, either for "notable scientific or industrial achievement in engineering" or for "conspicuous service rendered to the advancement of science, engineering and technology"
- the Michael Faraday Prize of the Royal Society of London, established 1986, for "excellence in communicating science to UK audiences"
- the Michael Faraday Medal and Prize of the Institute of Physics, for "outstanding and sustained contributions to experimental physics", previously the Guthrie Medal and Prize
- the Faraday Medal (electrochemistry) of the Electrochemistry Group of the Royal Society of Chemistry
