= CS Faraday (1923) =

Cable ship

History

United Kingdom
- Name: Faraday
- Namesake: Michael Faraday
- Owner: Siemens Brothers & Co Ltd, London
- Operator: Atlantic Telegraph Company
- Port of registry: London
- Builder: Palmers Shipbuilding and Iron Company, Hebburn-on-Tyne
- Way number: 939
- Launched: 16 February 1923
- Identification: U.K.Official number:147458; Signal: GBPF (Lloyd's 1935-36)
- Fate: Sunk by aircraft, 25 March 1941

General characteristics
- Type: Cable layer
- Tonnage: 5533 gross register
- Length: 415 ft (126 m) o/a; 380 ft (120 m) p/p
- Beam: 48 ft 3 in (14.71 m)
- Draught: 27 ft 3 in (8.31 m)
- Depth: 29 ft 3 in (8.9 m) (molded)
- Decks: 2
- Propulsion: 3 boilers, 2 6-cyl triple expansion engine
- Speed: 12 knots (22 km/h; 14 mph)
- Range: 10,000 nmi (19,000 km)

The second CS Faraday was a cable ship built by Palmers Shipbuilding and Iron Company, Hebburn-on-Tyne, in 1922–23, as a replacement for the ageing CS Faraday built in 1874. Design of the new ship was influenced by long experience with the original ship.

The ship was launched in February 1923 and by the next year was actively engaged in Atlantic cable work. Between then and 1939 when war interrupted civilian cable operations the ship laid cable from Australia to the Mediterranean. In 1939, after a scheme to recover German cable for use was abandoned due to the loss of the intended Continental terminus, the ship was taken over by the Royal Navy, became HMS Faraday for training and then returned to cable work. The ship was lost 26 March 1941 in an air attack causing fires and wreck ashore near St. Ann's Head near Milford Haven. In the attack and wreck sixteen crew were lost. Some remains of the ship remain visible to divers.

== Construction ==
Experience over the long operation of the first Faraday was applied to design of the second. The ship had two decks with a 179 ft (54.6 m) boat deck with housing for the captain, cable engineer and cable representative. Length overall was 415 ft (126.5 m), between perpendiculars 380 ft (115.8 m) with a beam of 48 ft 3 in (14.7 m). Molded depth was 29 ft 3 in (8.9 m) and design draft was 27 ft 3 in (8.3 m). Four cable tanks had about 4,500 tons capacity to load an entire transatlantic cable; a forward hold was provided for cable buoy and other cable equipment storage. There were three bow sheaves at the bow and two sheaves at starboard on the stern. The ship was designed for adequate water ballast to compensate for cable discharge. Total crew was in excess of 150 and the ship was equipped with five ordinary lifeboats, two motor lifeboats and two work boats.

Power was steam from three single ended, forced draft, oil fired boilers each with three furnaces and 15 ft 3 in (4.6 m) in diameter and 11 ft 3 in (3.4 m) long. Two six cylinder triple expansion engines designed to be capable of operating at very low revolutions for cable laying drove twin screws.

== Cable operations ==
Faraday was launched on 16 February 1923 and completed in April. The cable ship, assigned the number 147458, carried out her maiden voyage in that year with the purpose of laying cable between New York and Canso, Nova Scotia. In 1924, after laying cable between Barbados and other islands, Faraday laid the single, unspliced, 82.3 nmi (94.7 mi; 152.4 km) cable between Domburg, Walcheren and Aldeburgh, Suffolk in one of the early developments of undersea speech transmission. The cable was seen as a possible forerunner of trans Atlantic voice communication. By the end of that year the ship laid cable between the Atlantic islands of Fernando de Noronha and São Vicente, Cape Verde.

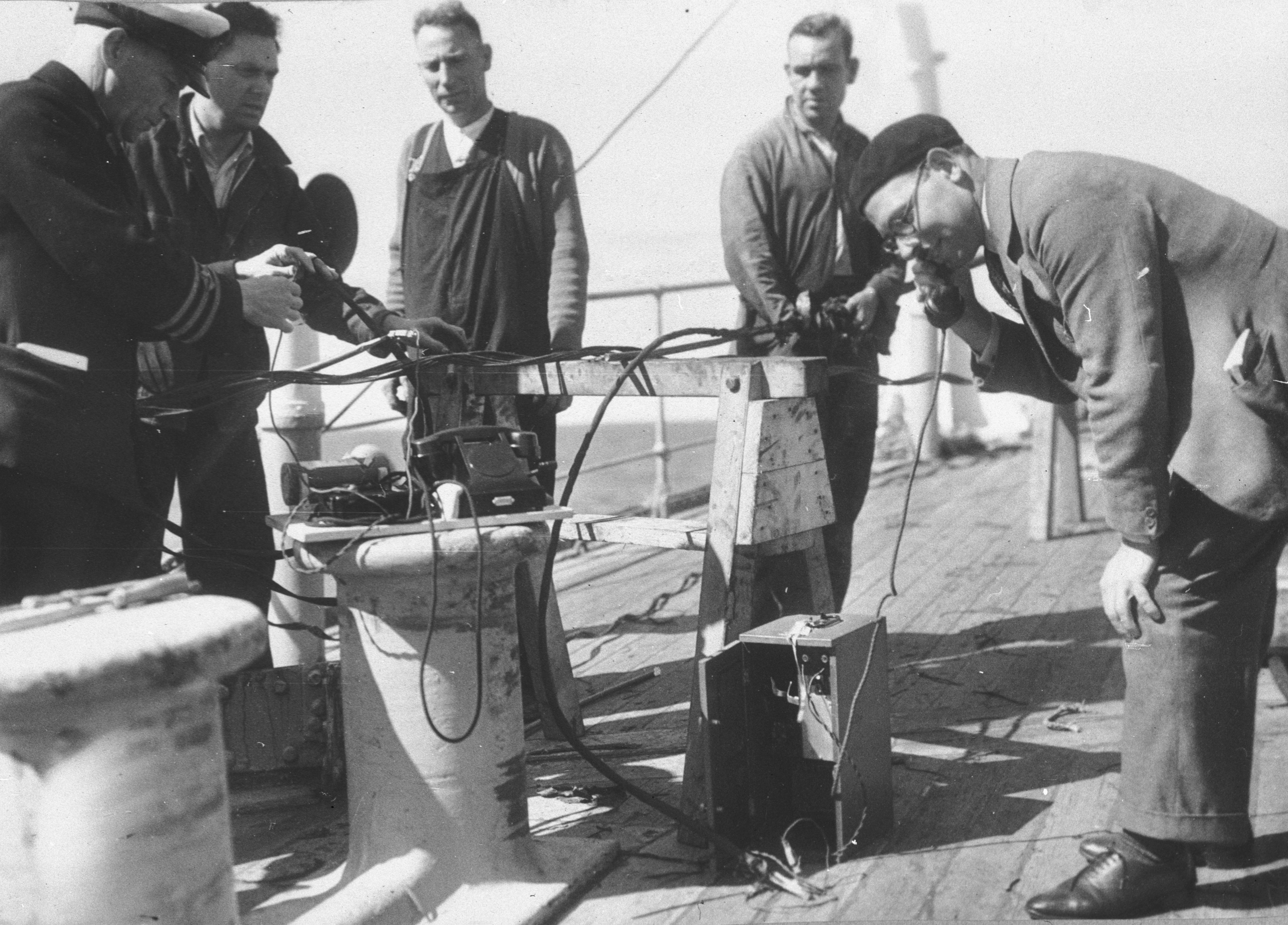
Testing cable on Cable Ship Faraday laying trans-Tasman submarine cable.

Faraday carried out a number of cable laying and surveying exercises both in home waters and the Pacific until 1939. Among the operations was the 1935 laying of the Bass Strait telephone cable to connect Victoria with Tasmania with six telephone and about twelve telegraph circuits with a single broadcasting circuit. The cable was a new type carrying the signal over a single wire described as a central conductor separated from another composed of "five copper tapes, which are insulated from the central copper conductor wire by a new substance known as “paragutta,” and covered again by a coating of the same material." — an early coaxial cable.

Faraday was chartered by the Admiralty to recover German cable off Ushant with intention of refurbishing the cable and relaying it to Narvik. This plan was cancelled after the evacuation from Narvik and the ship was then laid up until requisitioned by the Admiralty, becoming HMS Faraday with some of the civilian crew remaining on board to maintain the cable machinery, first for training of Naval cadets but then for cable work around the African coast.

== Loss ==
On 25 March 1941 the Faraday and four other ships set sail from Falmouth bound for Milford Haven. The Faraday was carrying 90 miles, (Note: Whether nautical or statute not specified.) 3,870 tons, of submarine telephone cable required in Freetown, Cape Town, Mombassa and Suez.

The ships became separated in poor visibility and about 7:45 p.m. on the 26th the Faraday was attacked off St. Anne's Head by a Heinkel He 111 which strafed and bombed the ship, killing eight and wounding 25 of the crew, and caused a major fire in the oil bunkers forcing the crew to abandon ship. The Heinkel was shot down by the ship's gunners.

She later ran aground at Hopper's Point, near West Dale St Ann's Head. Sixteen of the crew of 125 were lost in the attack and the wreck ashore. Most of the cable was recovered. The wreck of the Faraday still lies in shallow waters and is a popular attraction for divers. Remains are scattered with visible remains being a boiler and three drums of cable.
