= CS Faraday (1874) =

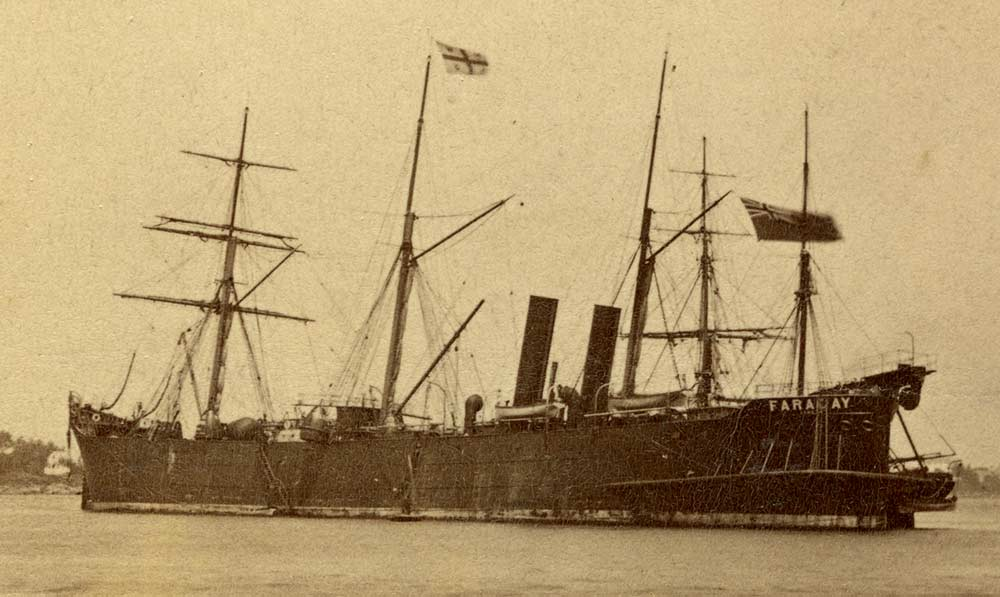
- CS Faraday shortly after her launch in 1874

History

United Kingdom
- Name: Faraday
- Operator: Siemens Brothers
- Builder: C. Mitchell & Company
- Launched: 17 February 1874
- Out of service: 1950
- Fate: Became a coal hulk in 1924, then a stores ship in 1941, scrapped in 1950.

General characteristics
- Tonnage: 5052 tons
- Length: 360.38 ft (109.84 m)
- Beam: 52.25 ft (15.93 m)
- Depth: 39.6 ft (12.1 m)

The CS Faraday was a cable ship built for Siemens Brothers and launched in 1874.

Faraday was specially designed for ocean cable-laying by William Siemens in collaboration with his friend William Froude, the pioneer of hull design. Built with bows at each end, she had twin screws positioned so that using one screw she could turn in her own length. The two funnels were located to either side to maximise clear deck space. To minimise rolling, there were, at Froude's suggestion, enormous twin bilge keels. William's wife Anne launched the ship with the traditional smashing of a bottle of wine.

The ship's first cable operation was laying the 1874 cable connecting Rye Beach, New Hampshire, with Ballinskelligs, Ireland by way of Tor Bay, Nova Scotia. Faraday spent the next 50 years laying an estimated total of 50,000 nautical miles (93,000 km) of cable for Siemens Brothers, including several transatlantic cables under the supervision of Alexander Siemens. She was sold for scrap in 1924 but proved to be too difficult to break up and was resold to the Anglo-Algiers Coaling Company for use as a coal hulk, being renamed Analcoal. She was moved to Gibraltar in 1931 to store coal and then to become a Royal Navy storeship in Sierra Leone in 1941. She was towed to a South Wales breakers yard for scrap in 1950.

A successor ship, also called Faraday, was built by Siemens Brothers in 1923, but sunk in 1941 following German bombing.
