= William Thomas Henley =

William Thomas Henley (1814–1882) was a pioneer in the manufacture of telegraph cables. He was working as a porter in Cheapside in 1830, leaving after disputes with his employer, and working at the St Katharine Docks for six years. During those years he was determined to learn a trade and used money from an aunt to purchase a lathe, vice and lumber with which he made a work bench. With those tools he taught himself to turn wood and brass and began to experiment, including with electricity.

Henley designed and built a machine in 1837 for covering wires with silk or cotton thread which is now in the London Science Museum (Object Number: 1939-139). The machine may have been Henley's original prototype. Around 1858 Henley developed a needle galvanometer that was installed at the Valentia Island, Ireland shore end of the 1858 transatlantic telegraph cable to receive the first signal from the North American terminus at Heart's Content Cable Station, Newfoundland. That instrument is also in the collection of the museum.

He set up as a submarine cable maker in 1857 and by 1859 he had his own factory beside the Thames at North Woolwich. Cable cores, the electrical component and its insulation, were obtained from Stephen William Silver and Hugh Adams Silver's India Rubber, Gutta Percha and Telegraph Works Company or William Hooper's company. (Note: Hooper's developed its own core sheathing capability and entered the cable laying business as Hooper's Telegraph Works, including construction of the CS Hooper that was the second largest ship of the time and first designed for trans Atlantic cable laying.) He went on to manufacture the shore ends of the second Transatlantic cable in 1865. The firm eventually extended operations to manufacturing gutta-percha and rubber core as well as cable laying and repair.

W.T. Henley's Telegraph Works Co., Ltd acquired cable ships for cables it would lay as well as manufacture. One, CS La Plata, was chartered by Siemens Brothers Ltd. to lay cable between Rio de Janeiro, Brazil and Chuy, Uruguay after the CS Gomos foundered while laying the cable with loss of 204 nmi (235 mi; 378 km) of cable. La Plata foundered en route to complete the lay on 29 November 1874 in the Bay of Biscay with loss of 58 crew and the cable. Other company cable ships were CS Africa, CS Caroline. and CS Westmeath.

W. T. Henley Ltd. was acquired by AEI in 1959, and later became part of GEC following its takeover of AEI in 1967. The company was sold to TT electronics in 1997. Today the company is a division of SICAME UK Limited and relocated to a brand new factory at Hoo (near Rochester) in July 2018.
