= Royal Geographical Society of South Australia =

Learned society based in Adelaide, South Australia

The Royal Geographical Society of South Australia, Inc.
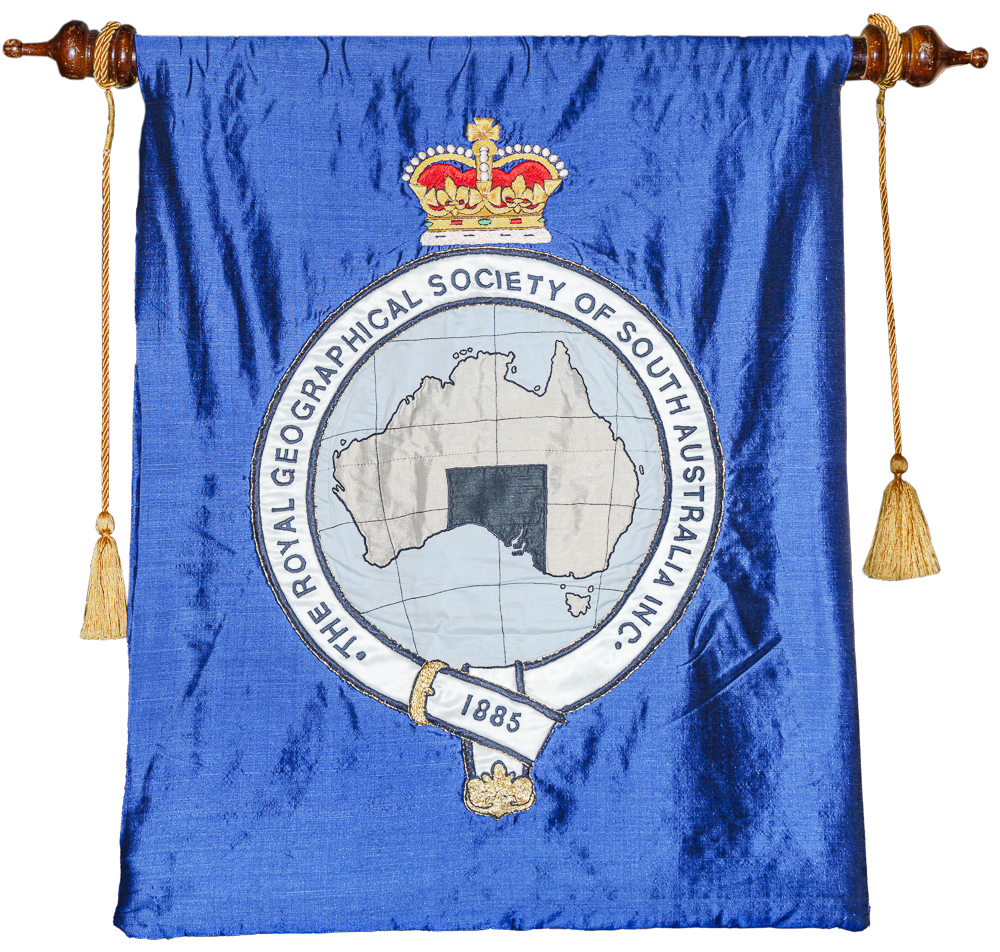
- Abbreviation: RGSSA
- Formation: 10 July 1885
- Type: Nonprofit organisation and Learned society
- Headquarters: Level 3, Mortlock Wing, State Library of South Australia, North Terrace, Adelaide South Australia 5000
- President: Leigh Radford, OAM
- Director: Iain Hay
- Patron: Her Excellency the Honourable Frances Adamson AC, The Governor of South Australia
- Patron: Rod Bunten
- Website: https://rgssa.org.au/

The Royal Geographical Society of South Australia (RGSSA), is a voluntary, community-based learned society based in Adelaide, South Australia. Founded in 1885 to promote the advancement of all aspects of geographical science, the Society has 342 members (2024), with its activities engaging the public through publications, lectures, public forums, awards, exhibitions, excursions and field trips, monument restoration, and its extensive library.

== History ==
One of the oldest geographical organisations in the world, the RGSSA was founded in Adelaide on 10 July 1885, and held its first meeting on 22 October of that year with Sir Samuel Davenport as President.

Originally intended as a branch of the Geographical Society of Australasia (later the Royal Geographical Society of Australasia), founded in Sydney two years earlier, it was named the ‘Royal Geographical Society of Australasia (South Australian Branch) Inc.’ Remarkably, "the parent body alluded to in the original title never came into formal existence". Whilst the parent organisation failed, South Australia's so-called Branch Without a Tree functioned autonomously and prospered independently, ultimately adopting its present name in 1996.

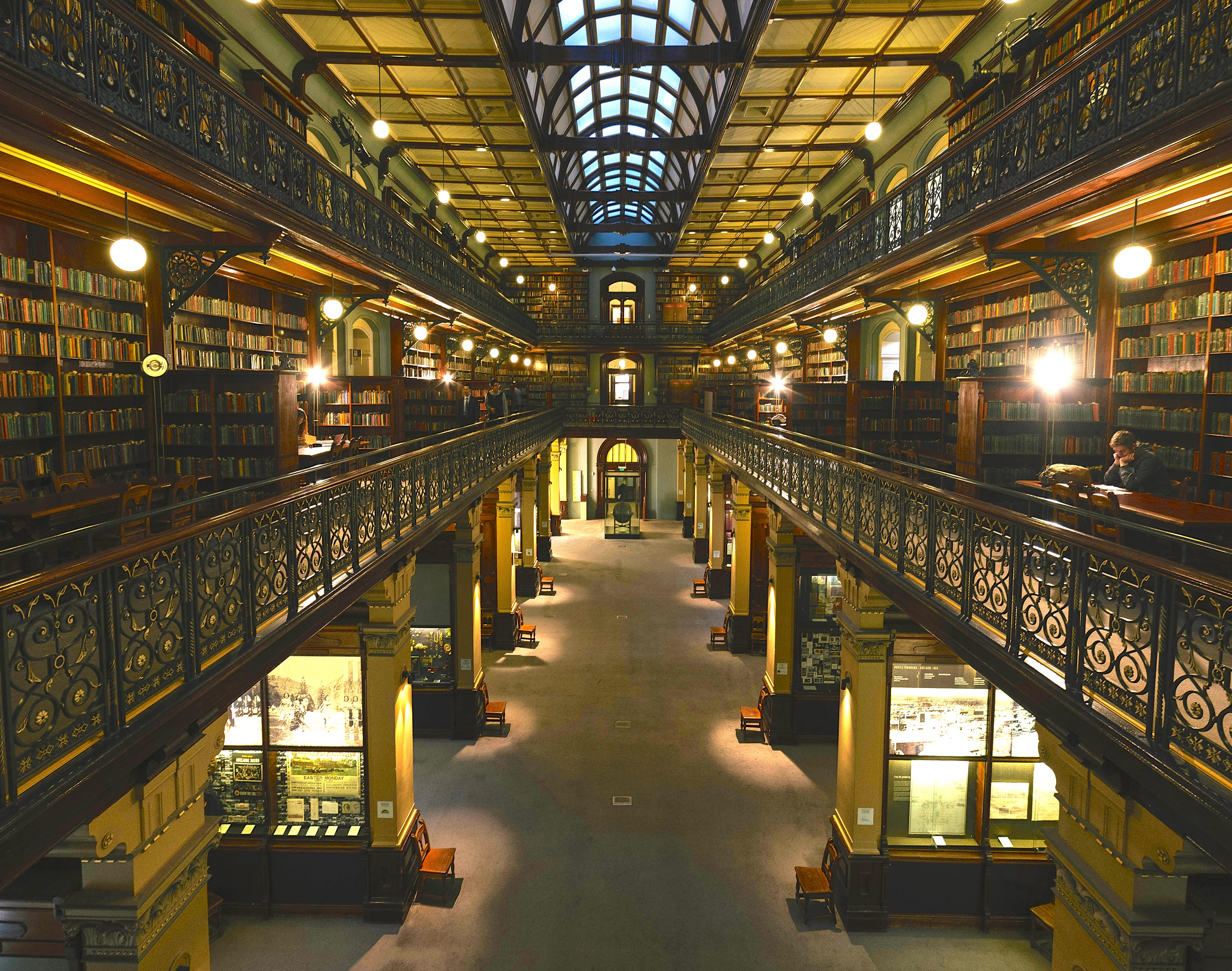
Home of the RGSSA: the Mortlock Wing, State Library of South Australia.

== Society connections ==
Since its inception in 1885 the Society has served individuals as well as private and public organisations by facilitating quests for new pastoral runs, mineral locations, and water. Difficult as it is to imagine in the 21st century, much of the country was not mapped until World War Two. Many of the State's movers and shakers agitated for, or were a part of, the early Society. They included “men of substance and ability” such as Thomas Elder, Samuel Way, Samuel Davenport, Charles Todd, Henry Ayers, John Langdon Bonython, John Lavington Bonython, George Kennion, John Anderson Hartley, Robert Barr Smith, Josiah Simon, Robert Kyffin Thomas, John Bakewell, David Murray, George Farr, Walter Tyas and in the 1950s, Warren Bonython, Thomas Magarey, Charles Hope Harris, and George Goyder. The Society had the State's under treasurer, Thomas Gill, as its inaugural Treasurer over the period 1885–1923.

From its outset the Society had very close connections with the University of Adelaide. From 1885 until at least 1931 the University Council included at least one-third of its members from the Society and often in excess of half.

The Society began with 82 members and until about 1945 always had fewer than 250 members. Membership in the earlier years of this period included some of last wave of the State's explorers. These included William Patrick Auld, Herbert Basedow, Peter Egerton-Warburton, David Lindsay, William Tietkens, Lawrence Wells, and Charles Winnecke. The Society's interests tended to focus on the region within which the Society was located in what has come to be understood a part of Modernist 'encyclopaedism'.

In the early-to late 20th century the Society was served by many distinguished geographers who have come to be associated with it, including Archibald (Archie) Grenfell Price, who was on Council for the remarkable period of 1924–62 and President from 1937 to 1938, Charles Fenner (President from 1931 to 1932), Leonard Keith Ward, and Douglas Mawson. More recently active members and leaders have included a number of celebrated scholars such as Fay Gale, Iain Hay, Les Heathcote, and Guy Robinson.

The Society also has current connections with the History Trust of South Australia through its History Network and Museums and Collections initiative. The Society also has links with a range of institutions and geographical organisations including South Australia's universities, the Institute of Australian Geographers, Geography Teachers’ Association of South Australia, Royal Geographical Society of Queensland, the Australian Academy of Science, the International Geographical Union, and the Royal Geographical Society/Institute of British Geographers (RGS/IBG).

== Activities ==
To understand the Society's activities from 1885 to the present it is important to understand the historical-geographic context within which the Society was located. In its early years the RGSSA played a significant role in supporting and promoting geographical exploration, particularly within the Australian continent. For example, a good deal of the colonial exploration of inland Australia was conducted with private sponsorship and in the name of the RGSSA, with the Society playing a role in two major late-nineteenth century expeditions, namely the Elder Expedition and Calvert Expedition in Western Australia. Additionally, the Society raised £2,000 to purchase the York Gate Library in 1905, a notable private collection amassed by a London merchant, Stephen William Silver, relating to geography, exploration, and colonisation. Whilst this purchase helped secure the Society's permanent home, which it still occupies in affiliation with the State Library of South Australia (formerly the Public Library), the acquisition saw the library become the focal point of the Society's activity and "a succession of paid but untrained librarians strained the still slender finances."

Moreover, the Society's focus transitioned from primarily supporting physical exploration as Australia's interior became more thoroughly explored and mapped to a broader engagement with geographical science. This involved a greater emphasis on education, research, and public awareness as stated publicly in the Society's Purpose and expressed through publications, lectures, public forums, awards, excursions and field trips, exhibitions, monument restoration, and continued maintenance of its extensive library.

For example, the society has an active publication program, highlighted by a guidebooks program including Exploring the Barossa, Discover Kangaroo Island, and Explore the Flinders Ranges; its Antipodean Perspectives in Geography book series which publishes short, high-impact monographs and edited collections in geography and allied disciplines; and a scholarly journal South Australian Geographical Journal published initially from 1885 as the Society's Proceedings and changed to the current title from 1996.

The Society also offers research grants, namely Dorothy Pyatt Postgraduate Research Grants for postgraduate research students and Library Research Fellowship. and numerous awards for volunteer and scholarly activity.

== Awards ==
The Society offers a number of awards to school students, undergraduate and postgraduate students, Society volunteers, and others who have made contributions to objects of the Society.

The John Lewis Gold Medal for Exploration/Geographical Research/Literary Work in Geography" was established in 1947 in honour of John Lewis, who was president for seven years from 1913 to 1920. It continues to be awarded as of 2025. Gold Medallists receive a medal, a certificate, and a citation.

The John Lewis Prize for Excellence in Doctoral Research in Geography Medal is awarded to a higher-degree student at a South Australian university "who has made a significant theoretical or empirical contribution to geography through the completion of a PhD (or equivalent)." It was formerly known as the John Lewis Silver Medal.

The Centenary Silver Medal "was established in 1992 to mark the 1985 centenary of the Society. It is awarded to a past or present member of the RGSSA to recognise their outstanding service to the Society as evidenced by long and active tenure on the Council and/or Committees of the Society or by significant contributions to the varied activities of the Society."

Honorary Life Membership of the RGSSA is made "to non-members of RGSSA who have rendered valuable service in the promotion, or furtherance of all or any of the objects of the Society."

Fellowship of the RGSSA "is for members of RGSSA who have made significant contributions to advancing the objects of the Society."

The G W Symes Award is "made to a worthy recipient who has authored an academic, peer-reviewed publication that relates to the history of South Australia (or the Northern Territory in so far that is affects the history of South Australia, recognising the intimate historical links between these two jurisdictions) and that is substantially informed by the discipline of geography."

== The RGSSA Library ==
Comprising over 25 000 volumes the RGSSA Library is the largest non-government, specialist geographical collections in Australia, including maps, manuscripts and photographs as well as books on the history of geography and Australian and world exploration. A collection of historical artefacts relating to exploration is also held. The Library's subject specialities are world exploration and discovery, travel and colonial history with particular relevance to Australia, South Australia and the Northern Territory.

The Society's collection came to be built around the York Gate acquisition (acquired 1905, about 7,500 titles), with three more collections subsequently being obtained by bequest or purchase from Australians Thomas Gill (1923, about. 2,400 titles), Dr Lucas Benham (bequeathed 1939, about. 4,000 titles), and Dr Jim Faull (donated 1990, about 100 titles).

The York Gate acquisition set up a special accommodation arrangement whereby items from the private collection are made available to the public for all time in return for the provision of library space. Initially housed in purpose-built premises in the Institute Building, the Society is currently located in the Mortlock wing of the main State Library Building on North Terrace.

The Library’s oldest book is a beautifully bound version of Ptolemy’s Geographia from 1482, along with 26 other books from before 1599 including two Ortelius atlases (1571 and 1598). Other rare atlases include two Colom atlases (c.1650 and 1670) and Mercator’s atlas (1635). The manuscript collection includes many significant items such as Joseph Banks’ manuscripts (1768, 1811), John McDouall Stuart’s diary of his fifth expedition (1861–62), and two letters by Colonel William Light.

The Library features significant accounts and artefacts of colonial exploration, particularly across South Australia, the northwest of Western Australia, eastern New South Wales, the Northern Territory, and Antarctica. The Society's collections include more than 1200 items in relation to indigenous peoples and culture.

The collection also includes numerous first-hand accounts of First Nations contact in Australia, New Zealand, the Americas, and the Pacific. These are produced, in frequency order, English, Latin, German, some in the three Asian scripts, Chinese Mandarin, Cantonese, and Japanese, and Arabic. (there are a few other languages such as Welsh, Syriac and Vietnamese). Australian Aboriginal vocabularies and songs are included, including sound recordings.

It has been acclaimed by some as one of the most beautiful libraries in the world.

== Governance ==
The Society is governed by an elected Council chaired by the President. The Society also has a Director. The Society’s business is managed by a series of Committees responsible to the Council. These committees include: Education; Engagement and Communications; Executive and Administration; GeoNext (for young and early career members); Investment; Library Management; Program; and Research Publications and Awards. The Society's joint Patrons are Her Excellency the Honourable Frances Adamson AC, Governor of South Australia, and Mr Rod Bunten. Councillors are expected to observe a Code of Conduct.

=== Presidents ===
- 1885–1894: Sir Samuel Davenport
- 1885–1887: Sir Thomas Elder (Acting)
- 1894–1895: George W. Goyder
- 1895–1900: Simpson Newland
- 1900–1903: R.K. Thomas
- 1902–1903: Simpson Newland (Acting)
- 1903–1907: Hon. Sir Langdon Bonython
- 1907–1910: William Birkinshaw Wilkinson
- 1910–1913: Arthur W. Piper
- 1913–1920: Hon. John Lewis
- 1920–1922: Simpson Newland
- 1922–1925: Edwin Mitchell Smith
- 1925–1930: Alfred.Allen.Simpson
- 1930–1931: L. Keith Ward
- 1931–1932: Charles E. Fenner (resigned 14 February 1932)
- 1932: Sir Douglas Mawson
- 1932–1933: R.H. Pulleine
- 1933–1936: Ferdinand.Lucas Parker
- 1936–1937: Victor.Marra Newland
- 1937–1938: Sir Archibald Grenfell Price
- 1938–1943: George C. Morphett
- 1943–1947: Clive Melville Hambridge
- 1947–1950: His Honour Sir Herbert Mayo
- 1950–1953: Harold Jack Finniss
- 1953–1954: F. Clarence Martin
- 1954–1957: Maj.-Gen. George William Symes
- 1957–1958: G.H. Lawton
- 1958–1961: C. Warren Bonython
- 1961–1963: C.L. Alexander
- 1963–1965: B.C. Newland
- 1965–1967: Kenneth Peake-Jones
- 1967–1970: Murray McCaskill
- 1970–1971: Bruce Mason
- 1971–1973: Ronald Leslie Heathcote
- 1973–1975: W.J.H. Slaytor
- 1975–1977: Martin Williams
- 1977–1979: C.R. Whitaker
- 1979–1981: Colin R. Harris
- 1981–1984: Brian J. Ward
- 1986–1988: Bruce F. Macdonald
- 1989–1991: Uni A.M. Carnegie
- 1992–1993: I. Jock Makin
- 1993–1997: Rod J. Shearing
- 1998–1999: John Seaton
- 2000–2003: Sue Barker
- 2003–2005: Peter Smailes
- 2006–2007: Nicholas Newland
- 2008–2017: Rod J. Shearing
- 2018–present : Leigh Radford

=== Directors ===
- 2022–present: Iain Hay

== See also ==
- Geography of South Australia
- History of South Australia
- Learned societies
- List of geographical societies
- List of historical societies
- List of royal societies
