= Steven Silver =

Steve(n) or Stephen Silver may refer to:

- Steven Silver (film director), film director
- Stephen Silver (born 1972), animator and cartoonist
- Stephen Winckworth Silver (1790–1855), clothier and outfitter
- Stephen William Silver (1819–1905), merchant and book collector, son of Stephen Winckworth Silver
- Steven H Silver (born 1967), science fiction editor and publisher
- Steven Silver (actor), television and film actor
