= York Gate =

York Gate or Yorkgate may refer to:

- York Gate, Leeds, house and garden
- York Gate, London, an entrance to Regent's Park
- York Gate Library, Adelaide, Australia
- York Gate Collections, London, now the Royal Academy of Music Museum
- Yorkgate railway station, Belfast, Northern Ireland
