= Kelvite sounding machine =

Small motor- or hand-operated windlass

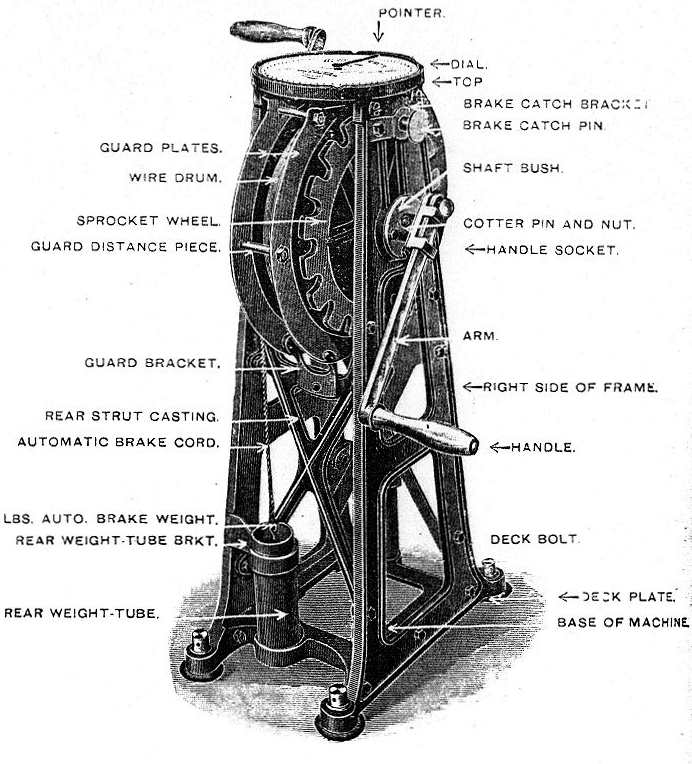
Kelvite sounding machine

The Kelvite sounding machine was a small motor- or hand-operated windlass mounted on the deck of a ship. It was used to deploy and retrieve a wire sounding line to determine the depth of water in which the vessel was operating. It was invented by William Thomson, 1st Baron Kelvin, in 1872.

== Description ==
The apparatus consisted of a 39-inch (980 mm) steel frame mounted on the upper deck of a ship, close to the side, carrying a vertically mounted drum. Three hundred fathoms (1,800 ft; 550 m) of fine steel wire were wound on the drum. A horizontal dial at the top of the device, graduated in fathoms, indicated the length of wire paid out. The drum was operated manually by handles mounted on the spindle of the drum, or by a vertically mounted electric motor in the base. A "sinker" of lead, weighing about 24 pounds (11 kg), was attached to the end of the line. To deploy the sinker a wooden boom, attached to the deck by a gooseneck and carrying a sheave for the wire, was extended over the water. The line was released, and when the sinker reached the bottom, the drum was held in place with a catch. The depth was then read from the dial. Printed tables were provided to calculate the depth of water when the ship was in motion; these showed variations for different forward speeds to allow for the wire's deviation from straight up-and-down.

== Development ==
In July 1857, Thomson sailed aboard HMS Agamemnon as an adviser to the first transatlantic telegraph cable venture. On 2 August, some 1,250 miles (2,010 km) west of the shore station at Valentia Island, the cable broke and sank to the ocean bottom. Grapples were lowered to recover the broken end, but this was not successful. Thomson noted that no depth-sounding apparatus was available on the ship to assist the operation. During 1872, on board his own sailing yacht Lalla Rookh and the cable-laying ship CS Hooper, Thomson conducted trials of a sounding machine, with the main improvement over existing practice being the use of piano wire instead of hemp rope for the sounding line. In April 1874, he presented his results before the Society of Telegraph Engineers in London. On 1 September 1876, he was granted a patent for his "deep-sea sounding by piano-forte wire" device. Thomson invested in the Glasgow company White & Barr, already a supplier of scientific apparatus made to his designs, to manufacture and market the machine. Thomson became a director of the company, renamed Kelvin & James White Ltd., in 1900.

In early versions of the machine, there was no dial indicating the length of wire paid out; the movement of a spring-loaded plunger (corresponding to the water pressure) in a tube mounted on the sinker left a mark that could be read when brought to the surface. In a refinement, which was considered to be more accurate than the dial, Thomson used a small brass pipe containing a thin, replaceable glass tube, closed at the top end, that was attached just above the sinker. The inside of the tube was coated with a chemical (initially ferroprussiate, later silver chromate (Note: Red silver chromate is converted to white silver chloride in contact with sea water, blue ferroprussiate loses its colour.)) that changed colour when wet. This colour-change indicated the distance to which the water had penetrated the tube. When the sinker was back on deck, the glass tube was removed and the position of the mark in the chemical was measured against a boxwood scale, inscribed directly in fathoms, to determine the depth.

== In use ==
Kelvin & James White Ltd., located at Hillington, Glasgow, was well situated to supply the flourishing Clydeside shipbuilding industry, and many vessels worldwide carried the Kelvite machine. By 1902, 7,500 had been sold. After the British Admiralty conducted trials in 1904, the Mark IV model, with provision for an optional electric motor for winding in the line, was developed. This was adopted by the Royal Navy and the United States Navy. The improvements were patented in November 1907.

Kelvin's machine remained in widespread use for many years, with production continuing until the 1960s.
