= Depth finder =

A depth finder may refer to any of the following:

- Sonar: use of underwater sound propagation to measure depth
- Fathometer or fishfinder: a device to locate fish at various water depths
- Echo sounding: a technique using sound pulses to measure depth
- sounding line: a length of rope used to measure water depth
