= Bevan Rutt =

Australian architect and philanthropist

Walter Bevan Charles Rutt OBE (24 January 1916 – 12 January 1988) was a South Australian architect and philanthropist, a prominent worker for the Guide Dogs Association of Australia.

== Biography ==
Rutt was born in Adelaide, the only son of Charles Walter Rutt (died 17 February 1932), architect, and Lillian May Rutt, née Nienaber (died 14 October 1953). He had three sisters: Ellen Elizabeth "Nell", Gwyneth May, and Edith Winifred. of Tusmore, South Australia. They regularly attended the College Park Congregational Church.

Rutt was one of the first students of King's College, Adelaide, (Note: King's College was founded in 1924 by the Congregational and Baptist churches of Adelaide, at 2 Halton Terrace (now The Parade), Kensington Park. It amalgamated with Girton Girls' School in 1974 to form Pembroke) with which his family had a close association. He attended the University of Adelaide, and was awarded a Diploma in Architecture.

=== Architecture ===
Rutt did his articles with architect Philip Claridge 1933–1938, and in 1939 graduated with an Associate Diploma in Architecture from the South Australian School of Mines and Industries.

He worked for the South Australian Railways Chief Engineer's Department 1939–1945, then was with Woodhead before working in partnership with James Hall 1950–1955. He then formed a partnership "Bevan Rutt and Roberts" with R. Bain Roberts, and brought in Kevin McPhee as a partner in 1964.

He was registered with the Architects Board of South Australia in 1941. He was a Fellow of the South Australian Institute of Architects and an Associate member of the Royal Institute of British Architects.

Rutt (alone or in partnership) had several significant buildings and other works to his credit:

- Alterations (1955–56) to Gay's Arcade for its owner J. R. Skipper
- Rebuilding the Memorial Arch, Brighton, with structural engineers Hurren, Langman and James
- Grain House, South Terrace, Adelaide, the shared headquarters of the Wheat Board, Barley Board and the Cooperative Bulk Handling Authority. Working with three boards was an exercise in tact.
- Block of flats for the Totally & Permanently Incapacitated Soldiers Association, also at South Terrace, Adelaide (1963)
- The Royal Society for the Blind complex at Gilles Plains, based on similar facilities in New Zealand, which entailed a visit to that country.
- Phoenix Society complex at Torrensville
- Extensions to the Spastic Centre at Woodville
- Factory for W. & T. Rhodes Ltd at Quebec Street, Port Adelaide
- Factory and office for Harrison Shoes at West Beach Road, (now Sir Donald Bradman Drive) Marleston (1960)
- Extensions to Glen Osmond Institute Hall (1964)
- Numerous private residences, notably that for Dr D. S. Forbes at Springfield in 1958–59. One such commission ended badly, when Leo McDonnell sued Rutt and his builders for £500, alleging negligence in specifications or in supervising the building of his house, after its foundation collapsed and had to be remediated.

He retired from architectural practice in 1973, though he is also reported as giving up his practice 30 June 1964, to concentrate on his Guide Dogs and Lions commitments.

=== Social ===
As a young man Rutt had many social and sporting interests: rifle shooting, motor racing, amateur theatre, and supported several organisations as honorary secretary; his father had early inculcated in him a sense of civic responsibility.

In 1940 the Sporting Car Club of South Australia (SCCSA), of which he was an active member, and the Apex club of Adelaide joined forces to conduct a car rally as a fundraiser for the Children's Hospital and the Crippled Children's Home, both of which had been starved of funds due to the War. Rutt was one of the SCCSA delegates to the organising committee, and this may have been his first contact with Apex, whose Adelaide club was formed in 1937.

=== Apex ===
It is not known when Rutt joined Apex, but he was present at the club's 3rd annual charity ball in April 1940, and a year later was not only a member but co-secretary of the club.

He was president of the Adelaide Apex club in 1948, and shortly after his term expired he was elected president of the SCCSA. In 1950 he was elected Zone Chairman of Apex.

From 1951 to 1954 (at least) he was hon. chairman of Wanslea Children's Emergency Hostel, (Note: Wanslea, at 222 Payneham Road, Payneham later 51 Cross Road, Kingswood, was a home for children whose mothers were temporarily unable to care for them.) a charity supported by Apex. He was the president of the World Council of Young Men's Service Clubs 1950–1952. At the 1954 Zone convention, held in Mount Gambier he was judged debating champion. In 1955, shortly before he turned 40, the mandatory retirement age for Apexians, he was made honorary life member of the Association.

=== Guide dogs and Lions ===
In 1957 he was invited to join the foundation committee of the Guide Dogs Association (South Australian branch), and was appointed hon. secretary. In 1961 he became national secretary. That same year he joined Lions as charter president (1961–62) of the City of Adelaide Lions Club. In 1962 the Guide Dogs association moved its headquarters from Perth, Western Australia, to Kew, Victoria.

As secretary of the Guide Dogs association he had an ongoing dispute with Phyllis M. Gration, president of the Lady Nell Seeing Eye Dog School of 16 Thanet Street, Malvern, Victoria, which amounted to a "turf war".

In 1964 he was elected the first District Governor of Lions district 201J. To fulfil this office he found it necessary to relinquish, reluctantly, his position on the national Guide Dogs committee. In 1966 he was elected national president of Guide Dogs, and remained in that position for six years, during which time the Association received royal assent, to call itself the Royal Guide Dogs for the Blind Association.

== Other interests ==
- Rutt served as councillor (Hindmarsh ward) on the Adelaide City Council 1960–1971, and was chairman of the Building and Town Planning Committee 1969–1971.
- He was a Justice of the Peace.

He also served at various times on the boards of:

- SA Fire Brigade (for eight years)
- Royal Institution for the Blind
- Australian Foundation for the Prevention of Blindness
- Queen Victoria Maternity Hospital
- National Safety Council of Australia
- Australian Asian Association

He was a member of St Peter's Masonic Lodge, and the Commonwealth Club of Adelaide

== Publication ==
- V. M. Branson; W. B. C. Rutt (1982). Lead with a watchful eye : the silver jubilee of guide dogs in Australia. J. M. Dent for Royal Guide Dogs for the Blind Association of Australia. pp. 132 pages. ISBN 0858880067.

== Recognition ==
Rutt was awarded an OBE "for services to the community" in 1969.

== Family ==
Rutt was married and had two children, Philippa Prentice Rutt (c. 1943 – ) and Charles Collins Leighton Rutt. They had a home at 18 Olive Grove, Hazelwood Park, also of Devonshire Road, Hawthorndene.
