= Edward Strickland =

Sir Edward Strickland, KCB, (7 August 1820 – 18 July 1889) was a British Army officer, commissariat officer in charge of the British army of occupation in Greece from 1855 to 1857 and a vice-president of the Geographical Society of Australasia.

Strickland was the son of Gerard Edward Strickland (a cadet of the Stricklands of Sizergh), by Anne, daughter of Francis Cholmeley, of Brandsby Hall, Yorkshire. He was born at Loughglynn House, County Roscommon and married, first in 1842, Georgina Frances (died 1876), daughter of Frederick Augustus Hely, of Enghurst, Sydney, New South Wales, and secondly, in 1877, Frances Marie, only daughter of General Tatton Browne Greave, C.B., of Orde House, Northumberland.

Having entered the Army, Strickland was appointed Deputy-Assistant Commissary-General in 1840; Assistant Commissary-General in 1854; Deputy Commissary-General in 1861, and Commissary-General in 1880. The next year Sir Edward Strickland, who was created C.B. in 1867 and K.C.B. in 1879, retired from the army. He served in the Crimea during the first year of the war, including the battle of the Alma and the advance on Sebastopol, and was commissariat officer in charge of the British army of occupation in Greece from 1855 to 1857. He was also engaged in the New Zealand Wars from 1864 to 1866, and in South Africa from 1877 to 1879. After retiring from the army he came to reside in Sydney, and took a prominent part in the work of the Geographical Society of Australasia, of which he was vice-president, especially of the New South Wales branch, of which he was president. Sir Edward is stated to have been the first to suggest the despatch of the famous Soudan Contingent. He died in Sydney on 18 July 1889, survived by his only child, Fanny Cecelia (1844-1922). The Strickland River in Papua New Guinea was named in his honour by the 1885 New Guinea Exploration Expedition.
