= Strickland River =

Strickland
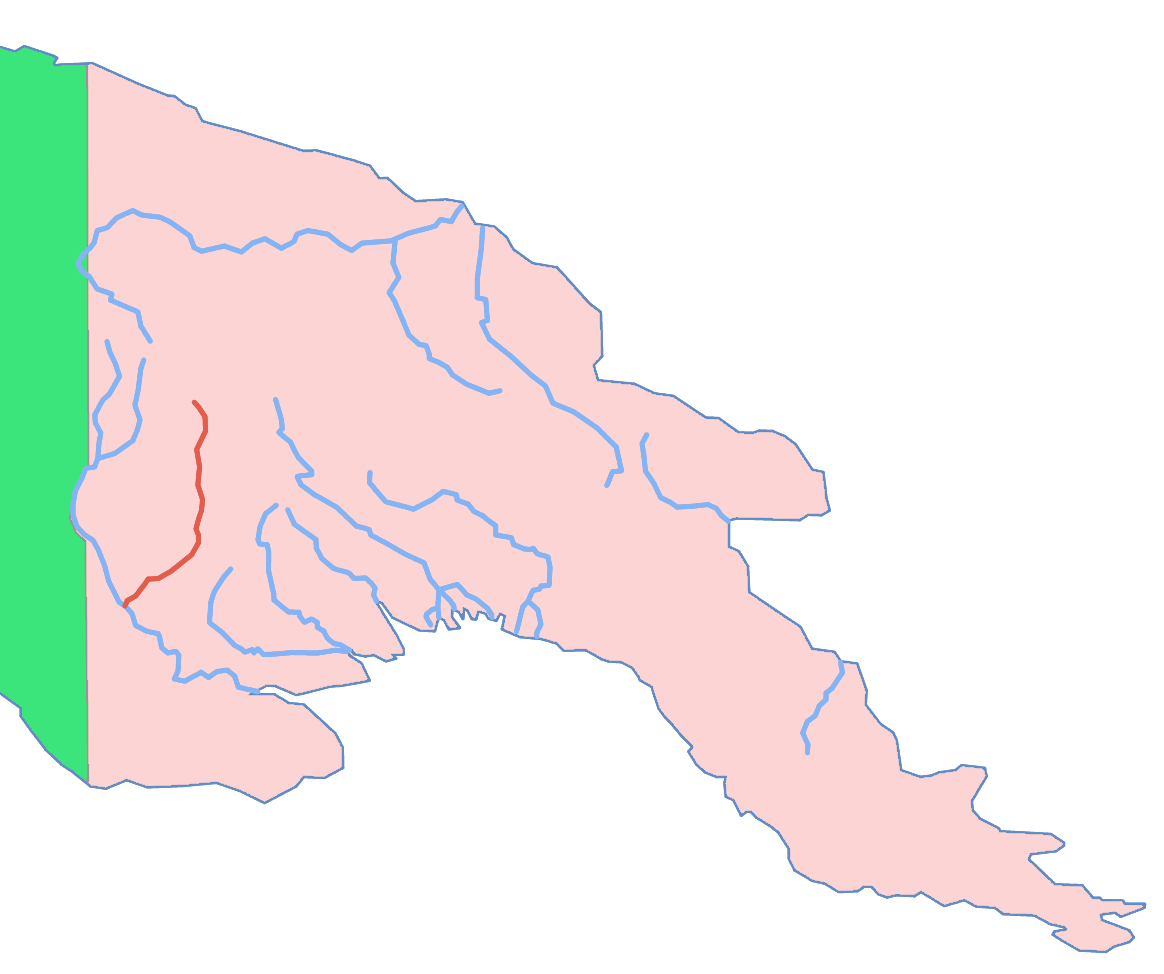
- Location of the Strickland

Location
- Country: Papua New Guinea
- Region: Western Province

Physical characteristics
- Source: Central Range
  - location: Confluence of Lagaip and Ok Om (Papua New Guinea)
  - coordinates: 5°8′49.9632″S 142°18′9.1404″E
  - elevation: 468 m (1,535 ft)
- 2nd source: Lagaip River
  - location: Central Range
  - coordinates: 5°38′52.692″S 143°36′48.7404″E
  - elevation: 2,710 m (8,890 ft)
- 3rd source: Ok Om River
  - location: Central Range
  - coordinates: 4°58′30.612″S 141°51′9.2592″E
  - elevation: 1,955 m (6,414 ft)
- Mouth: Fly River
  - location: Everill Junction
  - coordinates: 7°35′S 141°23′E
  - elevation: 6 m (20 ft)
- Length: 824 km (512 mi)
- Basin size: 36,740 km^{2} (14,190 mi^{2})
- Discharge
  - location: Everill Junction (near mouth)
  - average: (Period: 1999–2019)3,327.5 m^{3}/s (117,510 cu ft/s) 4,000 m^{3}/s (140,000 cu ft/s)
- Discharge
  - location: Herbert, Western Province (Papua New Guinea)
  - average: (Period: 1999–2019)3,274.8 m^{3}/s (115,650 cu ft/s) 3,500 m^{3}/s (120,000 cu ft/s)
  - minimum: 1,200 m^{3}/s (42,000 cu ft/s)
  - maximum: 4,500 m^{3}/s (160,000 cu ft/s)

Basin features
- River system: Fly River
- Tributaries
  - left: Lagaip, Liddle, Carrington, Aiema
  - right: Ok Om, Murray, Herbert

The Strickland River is a major river in the Western Province of Papua New Guinea. It is the longest and largest tributary of the Fly River with a total length of 824 km (512 mi) including the Lagaip River the farthest distance river source of the Strickland River. It was named after Edward Strickland, vice-president of the Geographical Society of Australasia by the New Guinea Exploration Expedition of 1885.

== Discharge ==
Strickland River at Herbert (2004–2019):
Year	Average discharge (m^{3}/s)
2019	3,370
2018	3,327
2017	4,027
2016	3,434
2015	2,467
2014	3,371
2013	3,450
2012	3,625
2011	3,563
2010	3,800
2009	3,270
2008	3,643
2007	3,004
2006	2,525
2005	3,036
2004	2,509

== Tributary ==
Strickland River List of tributaries by length.

- Lagaip River 213 km (132 mi)
- Ok Om River 90 km (56 mi)
- Upper Lagaip River 68.2 km (42.4 mi)
- Kera River 46 km (29 mi)
- Porgera River 44 km (27 mi)

== Environmental concerns ==
The Porgera Gold Mine, run by Barrick Gold, is a mine near Strickland, which is the source of environmental concerns in the area. Since 1992, Barrick Gold has dumped mine waste, particularly metal particulates or tailings, directly into the river. This process of riverine disposal by the mine has led to much controversy, with numerous deaths and environmental problems being blamed on the metal particulates.

== See also ==
- Strickland River languages
