= Ebonite =

Highly vulcanized rubber that is generically known as "hard rubber"

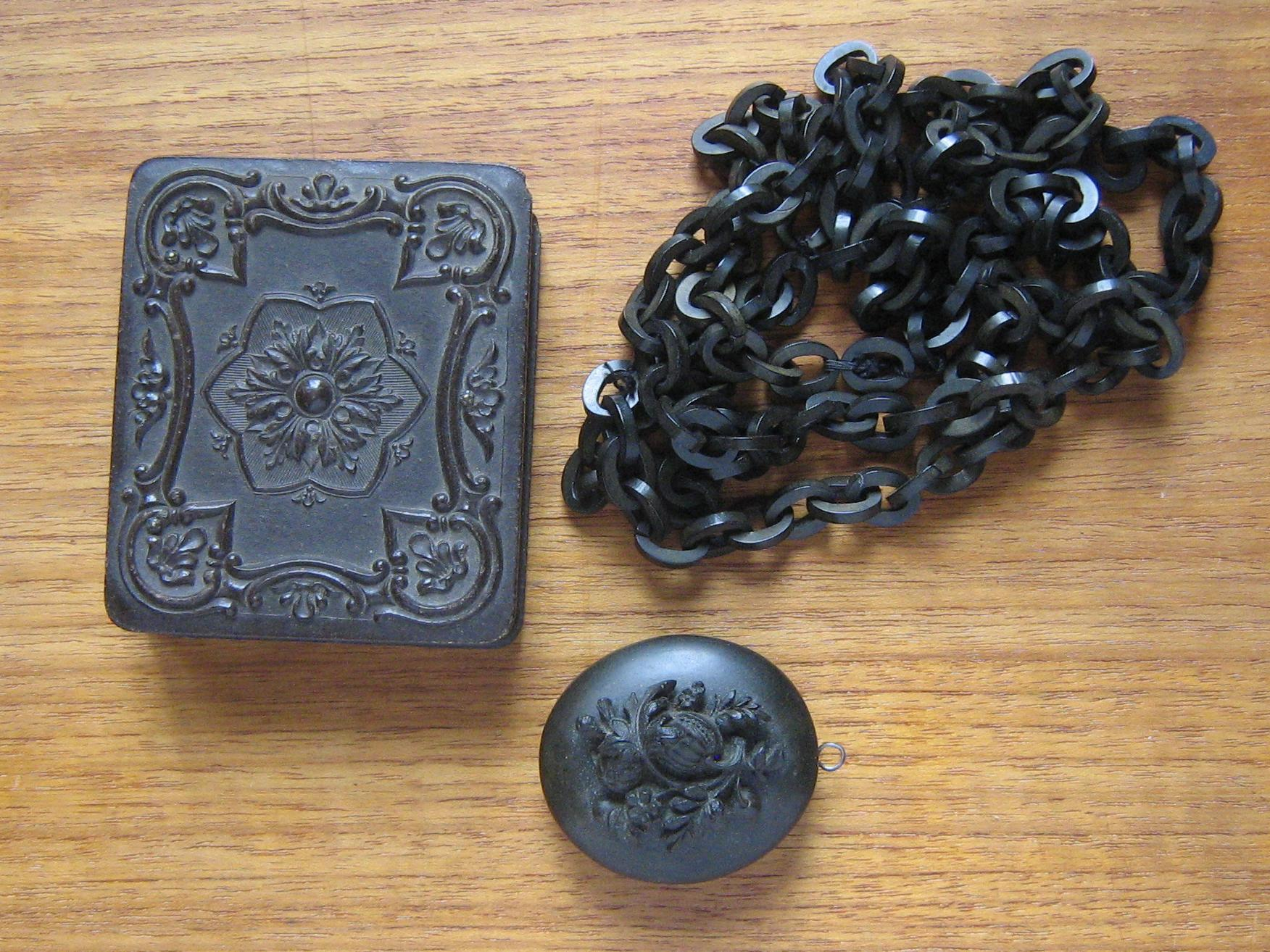
Ebonite applications from the 19th century

Ebonite is a brand name for a material generically known as hard rubber or vulcanite, obtained via vulcanizing natural rubber for prolonged periods. Ebonite may contain from 25% to 80% sulfur and linseed oil. Its name comes from its intended use as an artificial substitute for ebony wood. The material has also been called vulcanite, although that name formally refers to the mineral vulcanite.

Charles Goodyear's brother, Nelson Goodyear, experimented with the chemistry of ebonite composites. In 1851, he used zinc oxide as a filler. Hugh Silver was responsible for giving it its name.

== Properties ==
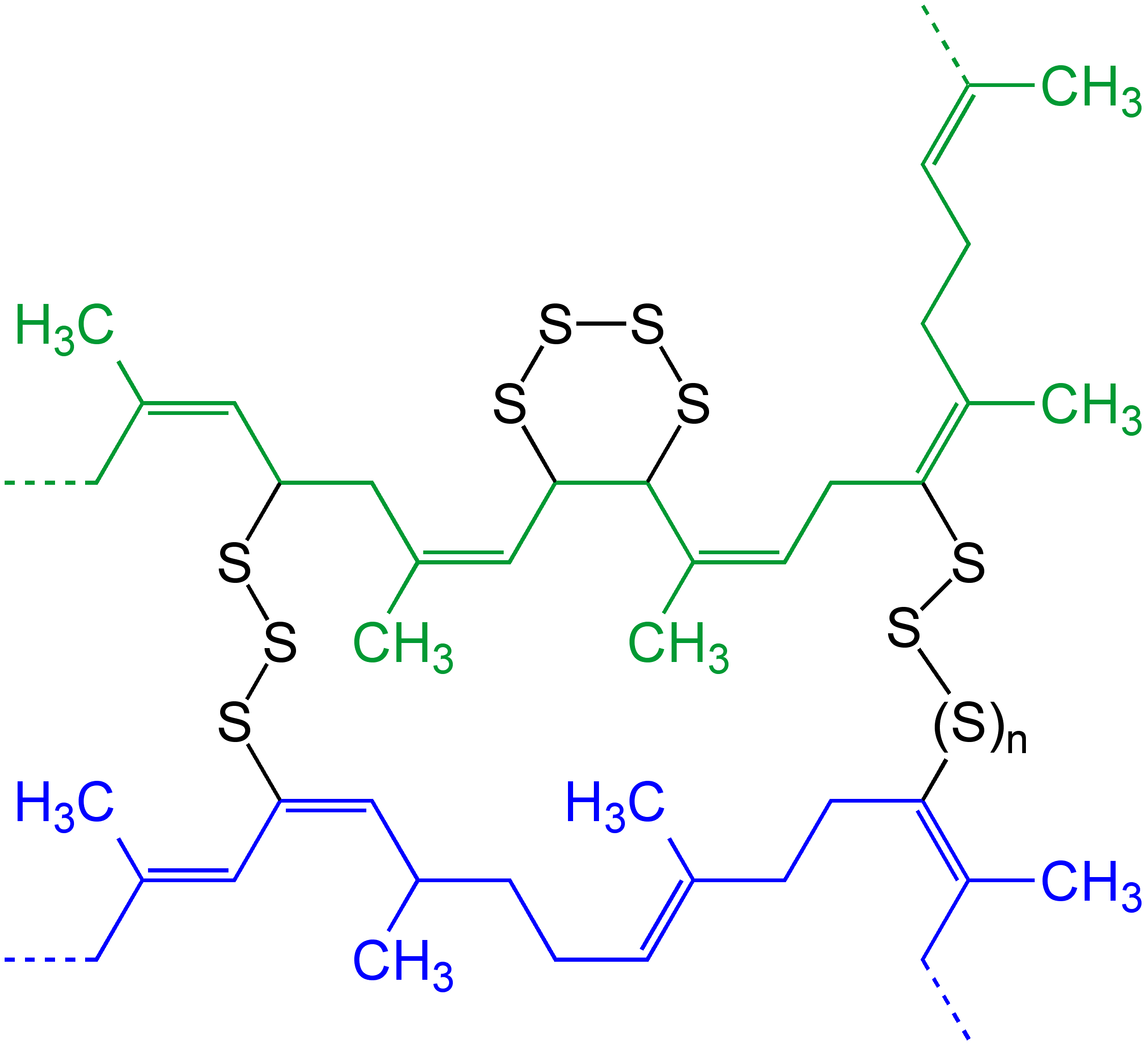
Schematic presentation of two strands (blue and green) of natural rubber after vulcanization with elemental sulfur

The sulfur percentage and the applied temperatures and duration of vulcanizing are the main variables that determine the technical properties of the hard rubber polysulfide elastomer. The occurring reaction is basically addition of sulfur at the double bonds, forming intramolecular ring structures, so a large portion of the sulfur is highly cross-linked in the form of intramolecular addition. As a result of having a maximum sulfur content up to 40%, it may be used to resist swelling and minimize dielectric loss. The strongest mechanical properties and greatest heat resistance is obtained with sulfur contents around 35% while the highest impact strength can be obtained with a lower sulfur content of 30%. The rigidity of hard rubber at room temperature is attributed to the van der Waals forces between the intramolecular sulfur atoms. Raising the temperature gradually increases the molecular vibrations that overcome the van der Waals forces making it elastic. Hard rubber has a content mixture dependent density around 1.1 to 1.2. When reheated hard rubber exhibits shape-memory effect and can be fairly easily reshaped within certain limits. Depending on the sulfur percentage hard rubber has a thermoplastic transition or softening temperature of 70 to 80 °C (158 to 176 °F).

The material is brittle, which produces problems in its use in battery cases for example, where the integrity of the case is vital to prevent leakage of sulfuric acid. It has now been generally replaced by carbon black-filled polypropylene.

=== Ultraviolet and daylight exposure ===
Under the influence of the ultraviolet portion of daylight, hard rubber oxidizes. Subsequent exposure to moisture bonds water with free sulfur on the surface, creating sulfates and sulfuric acid at the surface that are very hygroscopic. The sulfates condense water from the air, forming a hydrophilic film with favorable wettability characteristics on the surface. These aging processes will gradually discolor the surface grayish green to brown and cause rapid deterioration of electric surface resistivity.

== Contamination ==
Contaminated ebonite was problematic when it was used for electronics. During manufacturing the ebonite was rolled between metal foil sheets, which were peeled off, leaving traces of metal behind. For electronic use the surface was ground to remove these metal particles.

== Applications ==
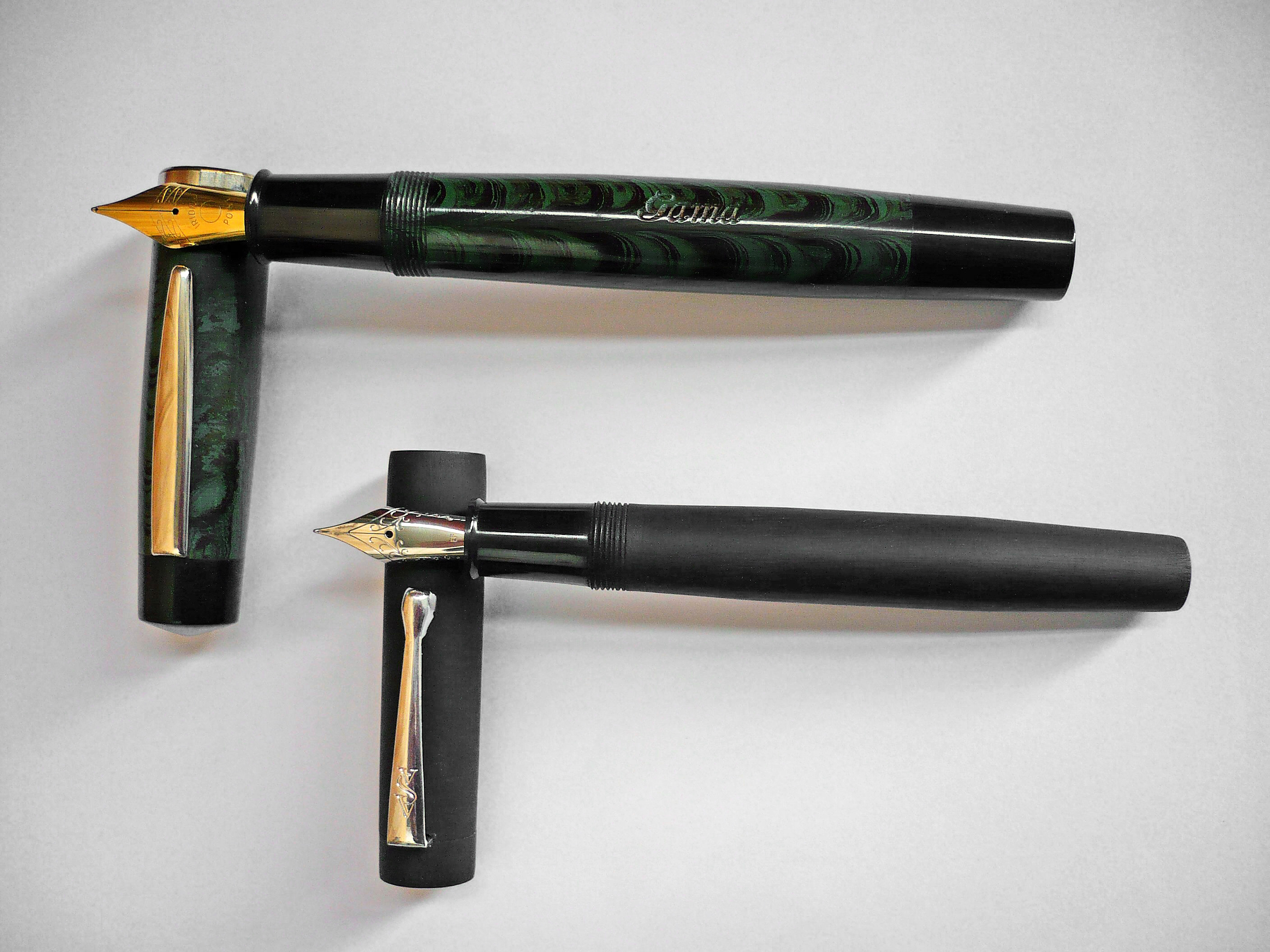
Green/black rippled ebonite fountain pen made in 2014 and black ebonite fountain pen made in 2017

Hard rubber was used in early 20th century bowling balls; however, it was phased out in favor of other materials (the Ebonite name remains as a trade name for one of the major manufacturers of polymer balls). It has been used in electric plugs, tobacco pipe mouthpieces (in competition with Lucite), fishing reels, hockey pucks, fountain pen bodies and nib feeds, saxophone and clarinet mouthpieces, as well as complete humidity-stable clarinets. Hard rubber is often seen as the wheel material in casters. It is also commonly used in physics classrooms to demonstrate static electricity, because it is at or near the negative end of the triboelectric series.

Hard rubber was used in the cases of automobile batteries for years, thus establishing black as their traditional colour even long after stronger modern plastics like polypropylene were substituted. It was used for decades in hair combs made by Ace, now part of Newell Rubbermaid, although the current models are known to be produced solely with plastics.

Ebonite is used as an anticorrosive lining for various (mainly storage) vessels that contain diluted hydrochloric acid. It forms bubbles when storing hydrofluoric acid at temperatures above room temperature, or for prolonged durations.

== See also ==
- Bakelite, an early mainstream plastic material.
- Tenite, a cellulosic thermoplastic material.
