= York Gate Library =

Private library incorporated into State Library of South Australia

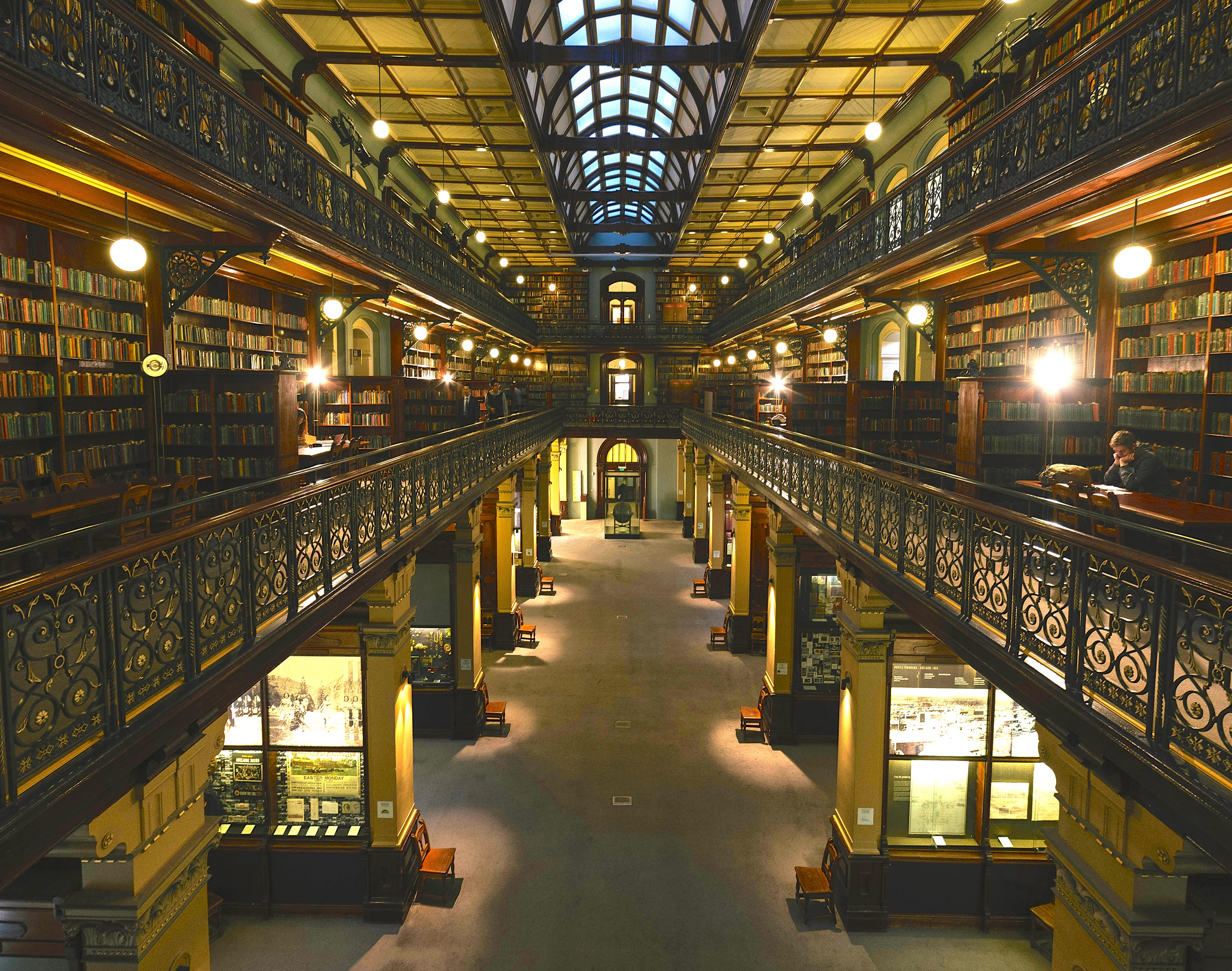
- Mortlock Wing, where the York Gate Library is now housed
- 34°55′15″S 138°36′08″E
- Location: Mortlock Wing, State Library of South Australia, North Terrace, Adelaide, South Australia, Australia
- Type: Specialist research collection
- Scope: Geography, exploration, travel and colonisation

Collection
- Items collected: Books, maps and manuscripts

Other information
- Parent organization: Royal Geographical Society of South Australia
- Website: rgssa.org.au

The York Gate Library is a library located in Adelaide, Australia, which was originally created by Stephen William Silver (William), a resident of 3 York Gate, London during the latter part of the nineteenth century. Silver, with his brother Hugh Silver ran S. W. Silver and Co., a company which grew from supplying clothes to people emigrating to the British colonies as well as the civil and military authorities. Following the death of William in 1905, the library was bought by the South Australia branch of the Royal Geographical Society of Australasia and taken to Adelaide where it was housed in the State Library of South Australia.

The library was officially opened at its new home on 8 December 1908.
