= New Guinea Exploration Expedition =

Scientific, Collecting & Anthropological expedition of Fly River Region, PNG

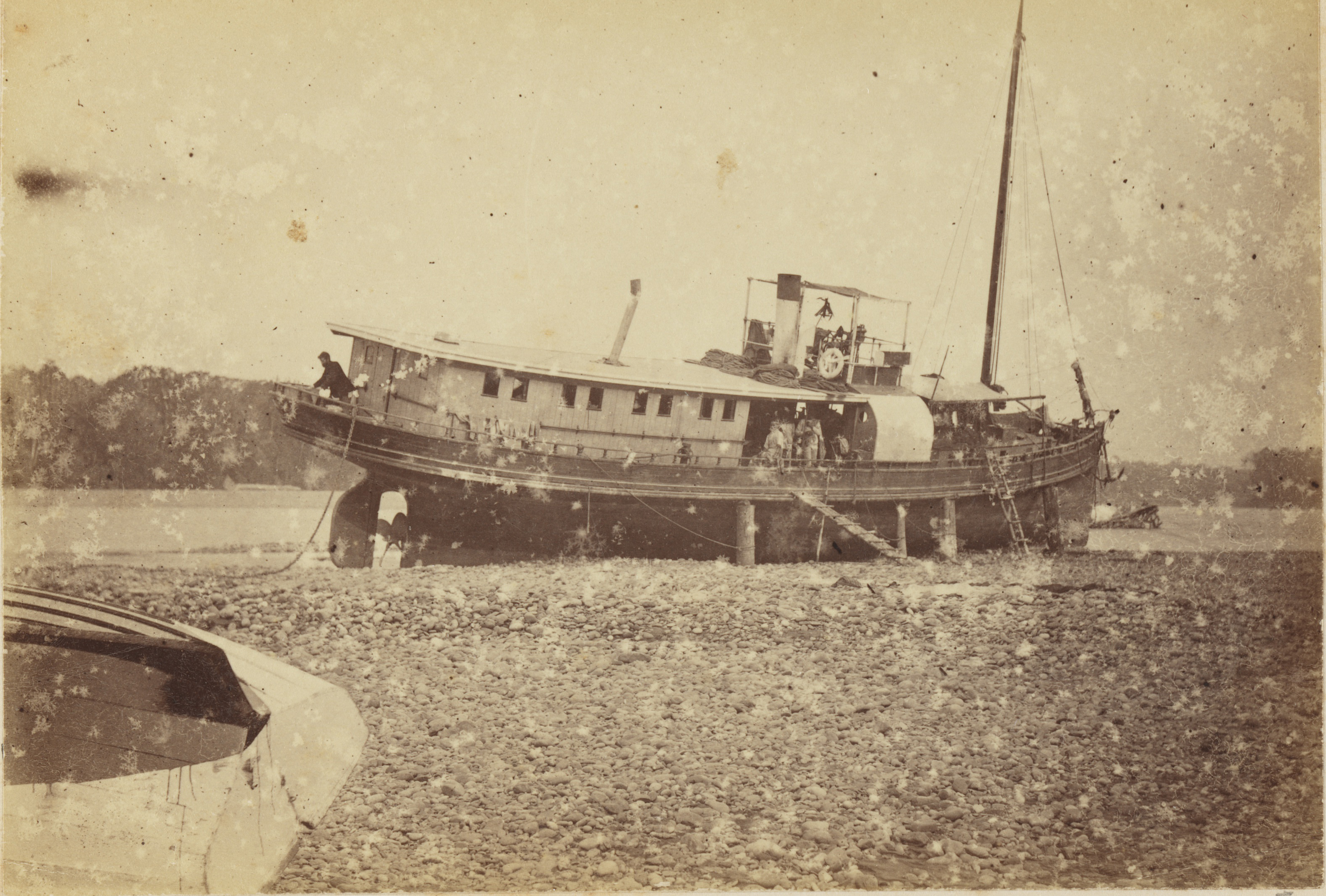
- SS Bonito, Fly River, 1885
- Location: New Guinea
- Country of origin: Colony of New South Wales
- Start: Sydney; 10 June 1885
- End: Sydney; 3 December 1885
- Leader: Henry Charles Everill
- Organiser: Royal Geographical Society of Australasia
- Funder: Government of New South Wales; Queensland Government; Victoria State Government
- Participants: Wilhelm Haacke; Sidney Adolphus Bernays; Henry Charles Everill; William Baeuerlen; Walter Wilson Froggatt

The New Guinea Exploration Expedition of 1885 was a scientific, collecting and anthropological expedition sent by the Geographical Society of Australasia to the Fly River region of the New Guinea Protectorate (present-day Papua New Guinea). Also known as the Bonito Expedition, it lasted for six months from 10 June to 3 December 1885, of which five months were spent in New Guinea. They named and explored the Strickland River, and made vast biological discoveries, including numerous species.

== History ==
An exploring expedition was sent to New Guinea on behalf of the three eastern colonies of Australia: Victoria, New South Wales, and Queensland. The major organisation was done in Sydney, but the other two branches of the society also contributed financially. The Australian Museum in Sydney also had the right of the expedition material choice, particularly regarding zoological collections. The party consisted of Captain Henry Charles Everill; sub-leaders Godfrey Hemsworth and R. G. Creagh; chief scientist and chief zoologist Dr. W. Haacke and his assistant W. Froggatt; surgeon, botanist and geologist Dr. Bernays; general collector and also assistant of the chief scientist Kendall Broadbent; botanic collector E. W. Bauerlen of Sydney; and photographer James H. Shaw.

The objects of the expedition were

. . . to ascertain and fix the geographical features of New Guinea and the nature of its fauna, flora, geology, and climate, and to illustrate the same by specimens, sketches, photographs, and written descriptions. The leader has been requested to obtain and note information regarding the language, habits, and customs of the natives; the character of their implements and utensils, and, in reference to their modes of sepulture, what implements, if any, or food, are buried with their dead, also, whether periodic feasts are held at the graves, and the traditional object of such customs. He has also to note the distance and course travelled, and to describe and fix the position of all the principal physical features of the country along the line of route, and on either side of it, as far as practicable, and daily to complete, from his observations, a feature map of the country traversed, a copy of which may be furnished to the scientific officers of the party, if desired. He is to note the number, character, distance apart, and general trend or fall of all water courses, or drainage channels crossed, the quality of water, if any, in such courses or channels; the mode of occurrence of water; springs, lakes, pools or running streams, with average depth of the same; the indications relative to probable permanence or otherwise of the same; also of periodical floods.

The Society chartered the Australasian Steam Navigation Company's steam launch Bonito, of 77 tons gross register as its river boat. It left Sydney in tow of Egmont on 10 June, and left Moreton Bay on 17 June 1885 in tow of the company's steamer Wentworth for Townsville and thence to Thursday Island by the A.S.N. ferry Alexandra. The Queensland Government steamer Advance (Captain Williams), took her to the mouth of the Fly River, where she was met by the Hon. John Douglas and Rev. McFarlane aboard the missionary steamer Mary. From there she would make her way to Mibu Island, in the Fly delta, and take on coal and fresh provisions from the schooner Mavis before proceeding up-river.

Their original target, the Aird River, some 100 km further around the Gulf of Papua, was abandoned when it was learned how difficult crossing the river mouth could be.

They proceeded up the Fly river to about 40 miles (60 km) past Ellangowan Island to a major tributary on the north-east side, which on 28 July they named Strickland River in honour of Sir Edward Strickland president of the Society. They proceeded up the Strickland to a point where the Bonito got stranded on a shoal or gravel bed, and a smaller party, consisting of Everill, Haacke, Shaw, Creagh, Froggatt and Waddick and some of the Javanese, proceeded another 80 miles (130 km) in the whaleboat. On returning to base they found tropical rains had lifted the Bonito off the shoal into deep water, so they steamed down the river and reached Thursday Island, and were back in Sydney on 3 December 1885. Stories had somehow reached Thursday Island through Rev. McFarlane, that the whole expedition had been surprised and massacred during the night and the Bonito had been looted and burnt. Accounts of supposed disaster were published in Sydney and Melbourne papers of 9 November and were not contradicted until the party had returned to Thursday Island. By this time a punitive expedition had been despatched from Thursday Island and a gun-boat was on its way up from Sydney.

== Exploration ==
Zoological specimens were collected by most of the expedition members.

== The people ==
The Europeans of the party were:

- Captain Henry Charles Everill (c.1847 – 7 September 1900)

Ships captain, ex-tobacco planter, spoke Malay fluently. His last years anything but heroic and he died at railway station, having stumbled from the door on the wrong side of his railway carriage, and was killed by a passing train.

- Peter Waddick (c. 1858 – May 1928)

Boatswain of the Bonito

- Captain Godfrey Ellard Hemsworth (c. 1857 – 12 October 1923)

A nautical man of Brisbane.

- (Richard) Gethin Creagh (c. 1847 – )

Son of Richard Gethin Creagh, lived Manning River, New South Wales.

- J. Wilhelm Haacke (23 August 1855 – 6 December 1912)

German zoologist, recently resigned as head of South Australian Museum

- Sidney Adolphus Bernays MRCS LSA (c. 1853 – 4 July 1903)

Surgeon, botanist and geologist. He married Amy Frances Whitton on 21 August 1888

- James Henry. Shaw (c. 1857 – 25 August 1908)

A seasoned explorer of New Guinea: he had spent 18 months with Andrew Goldie's 1877–1878 expedition, and another in 1878 with William Bairstow Ingham of the steamer Voura, and his engineer William Isles, who were murdered by tribesmen of Brooker Island, and which he survived, having been left behind at the base camp. He and his brother were sea-canoeists of considerable achievements He was later a professional fisherman near Pinjarra, Western Australia and was murdered by his business partner Oki Iwakichi.

- Kendall Broadbent (c. 1830? 1837? – January 1911)

Of Sydney had been on an 1876 New Guinea expedition as a bird collector, with Octavius C. Stone of the Royal Geographical Society and Lawrence Hargrave. He was obliged to pull out when he developed severe sciatica at Thursday Island. He was well known as collector and taxidermist for the Queensland Museum.

- Walter Wilson Froggatt (c. 1858 – 18 March 1937)

An amateur naturalist with a good knowledge of entomology and botany, later N.S.W. State Entomologist. He also collected and skinned vertebrates. Froggatt Street, Turner, Canberra, is named for him.

- (Leonhard Carl) Wilhelm "William" Bauerlen, properly Bäuerlen, and frequently "Bauerlin", (c. 1845 – )

Botanical collector, selected for the expedition by Ferdinand von Mueller, may have left Australia sometime after 1909.

- (Arthur) Hastings (William) Senior (c. 1857 – 1 January 1886) Licensed surveyor of Lismore, New South Wales, attached to the party at the last moment; engaged at a nominal salary. He died by drowning after the return of the expedition to Sydney. He was in a sailing party which included J. H. Shaw (above). Delirious from the combined effects of alcohol and sunstroke, he drowned when the 10 foot sailing dingy, The Top, was sideswiped by the steam lighter Alpha.
- Arthur James Vogan F.R.G.S. (c. 1859 – February 1948)

Artist and photographer from New Zealand. Joined the party at the last moment; engaged at a nominal salary. He was author of The Black Police (1889), later studied aboriginal rock carvings in Australia and various Pacific Islands. He was (mis)quoted in H. G. Wells' The Outline of History.

- William McGechan (c.1863 – )

Engineer of the steam launch Bonito

== Publications ==
- Bauerlen, William (1886). The voyage of the Bonito : an account of the Fly River Expedition to New Guinea; delivered as a lecture under the auspices of the Agricultural Society of Shoalhaven. Gibbs, Shallard & Co.
- Dwyer, P.D., Minnegal, M., and C. Warrillow (2015) The Forgotten Expedition - 1885: Strickland River, New Guinea. Journal of the Royal Australian Historical Society, 101(1): 7-24.
- Parnaby, Harry E., Dwyer, Peter D., and Kristofer M. Helgen (2023). Notes on Mammals Collected on the 1885 Geographical Society of Australasia's Expedition to New Guinea. Records of the Australian Museum, 75(2): 79-86.

== Maps ==
- New Guinea, Strickland River : Survey by S.S. Bonito, 1885 Area: from north of the 'Rapids No. 5' to Brenda Island, and from the confluence of the Strickland and Fly Rivers to Brenda Island.

Online image available via the State Library of NSW Shows route taken with dates and descriptive notes, some co-ordinate positions, villages, rivers, islands. "That portion of the river above Observatory Bend was explored by Leader and party in the whaleboat; and was plotted and drawn from notes by Mr. Froggatt."
