= York Gate, London =

Entrance to Regent's Park

Coordinates: 51.5235°N 0.1526°W

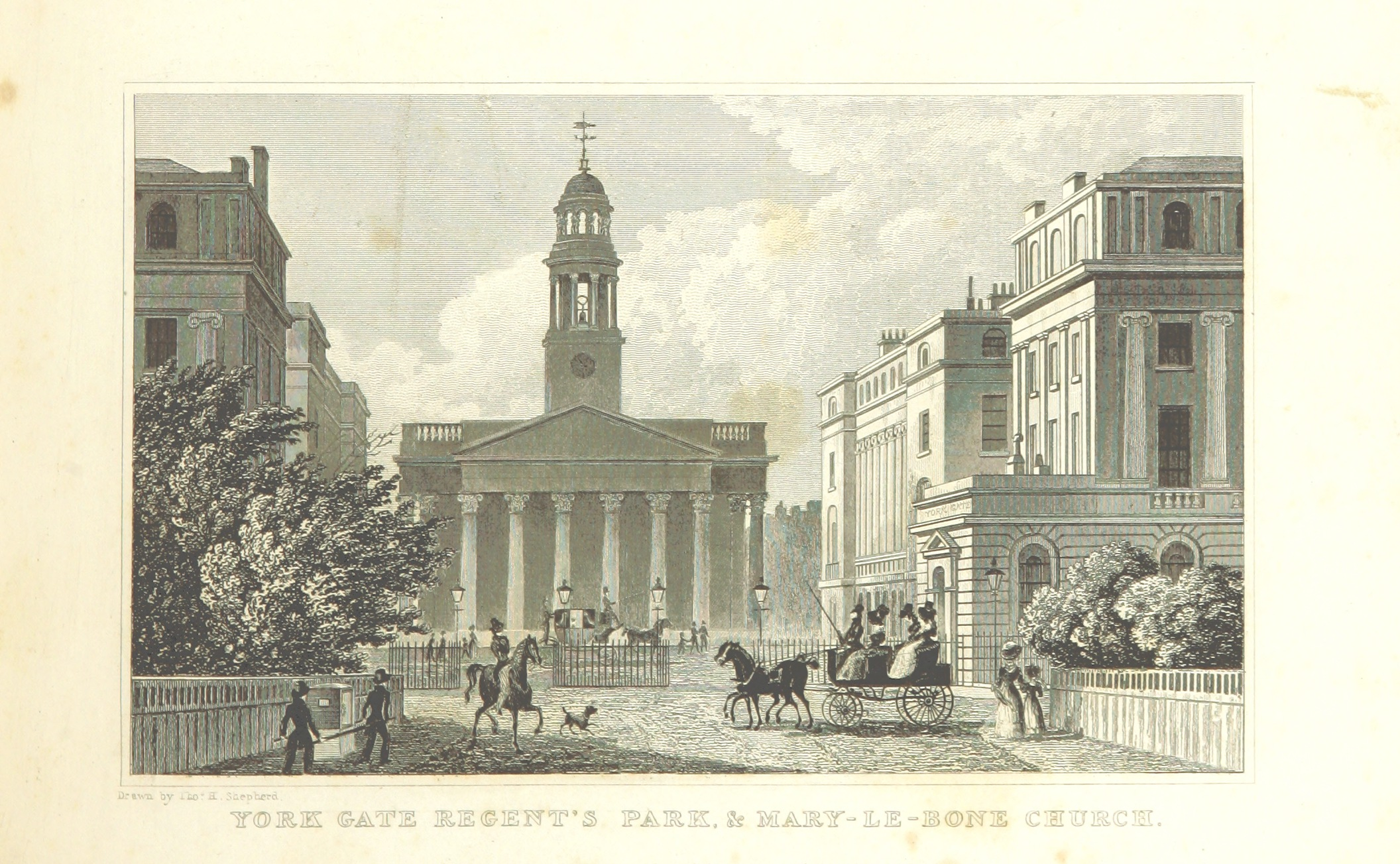
Looking through York Gate to St Marylebone Parish Church, 1828, by Thomas H. Shepherd

York Gate is an entrance to Regent's Park, London, designed by John Nash in 1822. It separates the east and west parts of York Terrace. It was designed as five separate houses.

== 1-5 York Gate ==
In 1998, 1-5 York Gate was acquired by the Royal Academy of Music thanks to funding from the Heritage Lottery Fund. Past residents have included Francis Palgrave, William Charles Macready, and Stephen William Silver. Silver developed what became known as the York Gate Library while a resident there. This consisted of over 5,000 volumes and was subsequently bought by the South Australian branch of the Royal Geographical Society of Australasia.
