= List of royal societies in the Commonwealth of Nations =

This is a list of royal societies (by royal charter) listed alphabetically with the date of founding:

== UK and Ireland ==
- Royal Academy, founded 1768
- Royal Aeronautical Society 1866
- Royal African Society 1968
- Royal Anthropological Institute 1871
- Royal Archaeological Institute 1844
- Royal Asiatic Society 1823
- Royal Astronomical Society 1820
- Royal Bath and West of England Society 1777
- Royal Birmingham Society of Artists 1868
- Royal British Society of Sculptors 1904
- Royal Cornwall Agricultural Association 1858
- Royal Cornwall Polytechnic Society 1832
- Royal Dublin Society 1731
- Royal Economic Society 1902
- Royal Entomological Society 1833
- Royal Geographical Society 1830
- Royal Geological Society of Cornwall 1814
- Royal Geological Society of Ireland 1831 – 1934
- Royal Historical Society 1868
- Royal Horticultural Society 1804 and 1861
- Royal Horticultural Society of Ireland 1816
- Royal Institute of British Architects 1834
- Royal Institution of Chartered Surveyors 1881
- Royal Institution of Cornwall 1821
- Royal Institution of Naval Architects 1860
- Royal Irish Academy 1785
- Royal Medical Society 1773
- Royal Meteorological Society 1850
- Royal Microscopical Society 1839
- Royal Numismatic Society 1836
- Royal Pharmaceutical Society of Great Britain 1841 and 1988
- Royal Philosophical Society of Glasgow 1802
- Royal Philatelic Society London 1869
- Royal Photographic Society 1853
- Royal Scottish Academy 1826
- Royal Scottish Geographical Society 1884
- Royal Society 1660
- Royal Society for Asian Affairs 1901
- Royal Society for the Prevention of Accidents 1917
- Royal Society for the Prevention of Cruelty to Animals 1840
- Royal Society for the Promotion of Health 1904
- Royal Society for the Protection of Birds 1904
- Royal Society of Antiquaries of Ireland 1849
- Royal Society of Arts 1754
- Royal Society of Biology 2015
- Royal Society of British Artists 1823
- Royal Society of Chemistry 1980
- Royal Society of Edinburgh 1783
- Royal Society of St George 1894
- Royal Society of Literature 1820
- Royal Society of Marine Artists 1939
- Royal Society of Medicine 1805
- Royal Society of Miniature Painters, Sculptors and Gravers 1895
- Royal Society of Musicians 1738
- Royal Society of Painter-Printmakers 1888
- Royal Society of Portrait Painters 1891
- Royal Society of Sculptors 1905
- Royal Society of Tropical Medicine and Hygiene 1920
- Royal Society of Wildlife Trusts 1916 1976 (incl the Royal Society for Nature Conservation)
- Royal Statistical Society 1834
- Royal West of England Academy 1913

== Commonwealth ==
Australia

- Royal Society of New South Wales 1821
- Royal Society of Tasmania 1844
- Royal Society of Victoria 1854
- Royal Zoological Society of New South Wales 1879
- Royal Society of South Australia 1880
- Royal Art Society of New South Wales 1880
- Royal Society of Queensland 1884
- Royal Geographical Society of South Australia 1885
- Royal Geographical Society of Queensland 1885
- Royal Australian Historical Society 1901
- Royal Historical Society of Victoria 1909
- Royal Historical Society of Queensland 1913
- Royal Society of Western Australia 1914
- Royal Australian Chemical Institute 1917
- Royal Australian Institute of Architects 1929

Canada

- Royal Society of Canada 1882
- Royal Astronomical Society of Canada 1890
- Royal Canadian Geographical Society 1929
- Royal Philatelic Society of Canada 1959
- Royal Heraldry Society of Canada 1966

New Zealand

- Royal Society of New Zealand 1851
- Royal Philatelic Society of New Zealand 1888
- Royal New Zealand Plunket Society 1907
- Royal Astronomical Society of New Zealand 1920
- Royal Numismatic Society of New Zealand 1931
- Royal New Zealand Society for the Prevention of Cruelty to Animals 1933

South Africa

- Royal Society of South Africa 1877
