= India Rubber, Gutta Percha and Telegraph Works Company =

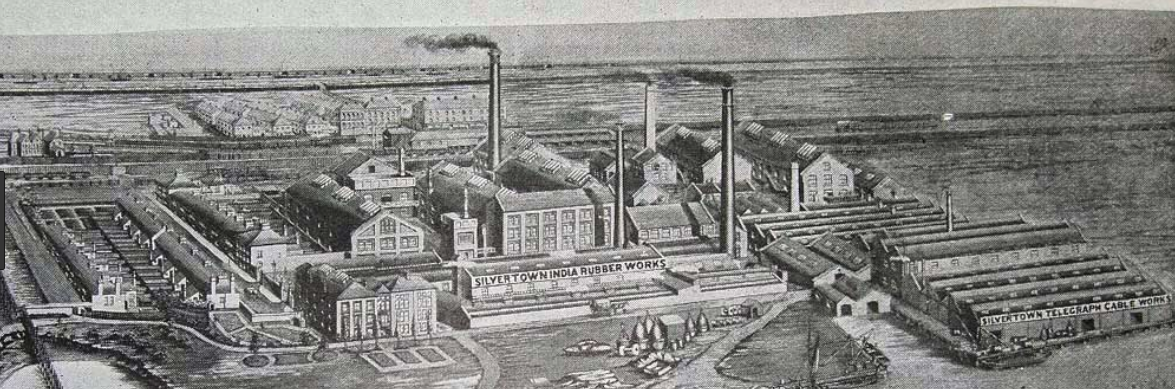
- View of the premises of the India Rubber, Gutta Percha and Telegraph Works Company, c. 1869
- Formerly: Silver's Indiarubber Works and Telegraph Cable Company Ltd.
- Industry: industry
- Founded: March 1864; 162 years ago in Silvertown, London, England
- Headquarters: Silvertown

The India Rubber, Gutta Percha and Telegraph Works Company was a London-based company based in Silvertown, East London. It was founded by Stephen William Silver in March 1864 as Silver's Indiarubber Works and Telegraph Cable Company Ltd. The company`s prospectus was advertised in the British press on 18 March 1864, and invited subscriptions for an issue of 5000 shares of 50 pounds each. The company was formally registered on 31 March 1864. Letters of allotment were sent out at the beginning of April. However in July that year the name was changed to the India Rubber, Gutta Percha and Telegraph Works Company.

== Origins ==
S.W. Silver & Company had been doing business since the 18th century supplying colonial and army needs for clothing and acting as shipping agents for personnel traveling overseas. After Charles Macintosh developed waterproofing for fabric the company set up a factory at Greenwich for manufacture of such goods. After that factory began manufacture of insulated wire and cable the factory was moved across the Thames to North Woolwich and continued to expand with much of the local population employed in the works and the area becoming known as Silvertown. Before becoming a limited company the manufacture of cable had been restricted to relatively short segments of the cable and core (the conductor and inner insulation). Silver's sons, Stephen William Silver and Hugh Adams Silver took over and expanded the business and began more work with submarine cable insulation becoming in 1863 Silver’s India Rubber Works & Telegraph Cable Company, Limited.

In 1864 Charles Hancock merged his West Ham Gutta Percha Company into Silver's company to form the India Rubber, Gutta Percha and Telegraph Works Company. Charles Hancock, a younger brother of Thomas Hancock, had been a founder of the Gutta Percha Company, but after a dispute with his partner he left to set up the rival West Ham Gutta Percha Company in 1850 with the support of his family. With Hancock's patents and experience in submarine cable manufacture the new company entered fully into the submarine cable manufacturing business while maintaining a profitable business ranging from making rubber bands to waterproof coats.

== Submarine cable ==
The company entered the business of laying as well as manufacturing cables for other companies engaged in cable laying. In 1865 the company manufactured and laid its first cable for the Submarine Telegraph Company from Dover to Cap Gris Nez. In 1867 it manufactured and laid a cable linking Key West with Havana and Punta Rassa for the Florida based International Ocean Telegraph Company. The relationship with that Florida company resulted in cooperative founding of three new system operation companies, the West India and Panama Telegraph Company, the Cuba Submarine Telegraph Company and the Panama and South Pacific Telegraph Company. The company's cable ships CS Dacia and CS International were used to lay the 4,000 nmi (4,600 mi; 7,400 km) of cable for those three systems Both ships were engaged in some of the first oceanic surveys in examining cable routing for Spanish National Telegraph Company, with the Silver company being a major investor and contractor for cable and installation, cables from Cádiz to the Canary Islands. They made two zig-zag sounding lines gathering 552 soundings.

After 1902 the company largely withdrew from cable manufacture but continued installing submarine cable until 1914 when only one cable ship, Dacia remained. Dacia was torpedoed 3 December 1916 by U-38 off Funchal, Madeira while diverting the German South American cable into Brest. U-38 sunk two other ships in this action and shelled Funchal with the British cable station as a primary target. The ship had previously repaired French cables and diverted German-African cables. The company withdrew from submarine cable work until 1922. Another ship, renamed CS Silvergray, was acquired and modified for cable work that continued several years until that ship was sold to the Medway Steam Packet Company and the company's submarine cable work ceased.

=== Cable ships ===
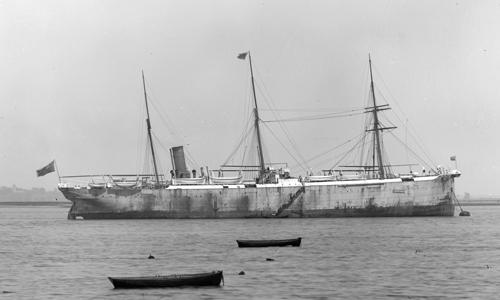
CS Silvertown (ex Hooper) in 1901.

Dacia and International were joined by two more ships as the cable laying business grew. CS Hooper, built by Hooper's Telegraph Works as the second specifically designed cable ship and first ship designed for transatlantic cable laying was second in size only to Great Eastern when built in 1873. Hooper was acquired in 1881 and renamed Silvertown. (Note: Built by C. Mitchell and Co., Newcastle, 1873, 4,935 GRT. Sold 1881 to India Rubber, Gutta Percha and Telegraph Works Company and renamed Silvertown which was active in cable work through 1913. Silvertown began the trans Pacific cable at San Francisco for the Commercial Pacific Cable Company in 1902.) CS Buccaneer was built for the company as tender to Silvertown with two cable tanks but no cable laying machinery until a later refit when that machinery and bow sheaves were fitted. The last cable ship, replacing the torpedoed Dacia, was Silvergray purchased in 1922 which was in operation only a few years as a cable ship.

== Other business ==
During the 1880s some of the first Bell’s patent telephones were manufactured at the Silvertown plant. The company by the 1890s was a supplier of electric generating plants to cities and towns both in the United Kingdom and on the Continent. Bicycle and later automobile tires were a major business segment in later years. By 1927 the company was in financial difficulty until the British Goodrich Rubber Company, itself a subsidiary of the B.F. Goodrich Company, acquired a controlling interest in 1933 and a year later the company's name was changed to British Tyre & Rubber Company.
