= Iain Hay =

Australian-New Zealand geographer

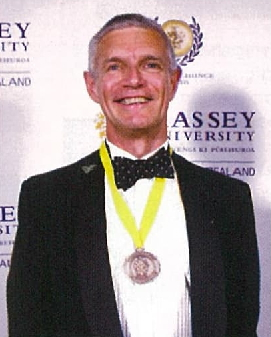
- Hay in 2016
- Born: Iain Mill Hay; 1960 (age 65–66); New Zealand
- Title: Matthew Flinders Distinguished Professor Emeritus

Academic background
- Education: BSc(Hons 1st), MA (Distinction), PhD, MEdMgmt, LittD
- Alma mater: University of Washington University of Canterbury

Academic work
- Discipline: Geography; history; ethics; higher education

Iain Mill Hay (born 1960) is an Australian geographer. He is Matthew Flinders Distinguished Professor Emeritus of Geography at Flinders University, known for his contributions to geography, history, ethics, and higher education. He is currently director of the Royal Geographical Society of South Australia (RGSSA).

== Early life and education ==
Hay was born in Whanganui, New Zealand in 1960. His university studies began when he joined the Royal New Zealand Air Force (RNZAF) in 1978 as a university officer cadet. This programme required study towards a degree at the University of Canterbury. After satisfying the requirements for a bachelor's degree in human and physical geography, Hay was commissioned as a flying officer and transferred to RNZAF Base Auckland. There, he also studied sociology part-time at the University of Auckland. This work was abruptly interrupted by a car accident towards the end of 1981. Following his resignation from the RNZAF in 1982, Hay completed a Bachelor of Science (Honours) degree, with first-class honours in geography at Canterbury, graduating in 1983, and accepted a position as a junior lecturer at Massey University in Palmerston North. While working at Massey, he completed a Master of Arts degree with distinction, which was subsequently published in 1989 by Oxford University Press under the title The Caring Commodity. The Provision of Health Care in New Zealand. In 1985, a Fulbright Scholarship, a Graduate Recruitment Fellowship, and the prospects of an overseas experience, lured Hay to the University of Washington, Seattle, where he worked on a PhD, completed in December 1989. His dissertation, titled Lo(o)sing Control. Money, Medicine and Malpractice in American Society, was published by Praeger Publishers as by Money, Medicine and Malpractice in American Society in 1992. In 2008, he earned a Master of Educational Management degree at Flinders University, and in 2008 the University of Canterbury awarded him a higher doctorate (LittD) for published work on geographies of oppression and domination.

== Professional experience ==
Hay joined the Department of Geography at the University of Wollongong in 1990 before moving to Flinders University in 1992. There he spent much of his professional academic career, being promoted to senior lecturer in 1993, reader/associate professor in 1997 and professor of geography in 2000. He was one of the first cohort to be awarded the title of Matthew Flinders Distinguished Professor in October 2012. While at Flinders, Hay accepted visiting positions at the University of Auckland, Bristol University (as Benjamin Meaker Visiting Professor in 2015), University of Edinburgh, University of Kentucky, and University of Manchester. During his time at Flinders University, Hay served as foundation dean (education) in the College of Humanities, Arts and Social Sciences, and earlier as head of the School of Geography, Population and Environmental Management.

Hay retired from Flinders University in 2019 and over the following years accepted a number of governance roles related to his long-term academic interests including memberships of the SACE Board of South Australia; St Peter's Girls School, and HCi Health Care Insurance. In 2022, he was appointed inaugural director of the RGSSA, having been a member of the society since 2002 and serving earlier as councillor, journal editor, and vice president.

== Professional contributions ==
=== Research and disciplinary development ===
Hay's research focuses on economic inequality, oppression, ethics, and fairness within a geographical context. He is the author or editor of seventeen books, a number of which have appeared in multiple editions. These volumes cover inter alia New Zealand and US history, qualitative research methods, research ethics, academic professional development, study skills, and geographical education.He is also a commentator on issues in higher education and his scholarship in geography includes work on the super-rich and wealth inequality.

Hay has participated in national and international academic projects. He co-founded and directed the International Network of Learning and Teaching Geography in Higher Education (INLT) from 1999 to 2005, with Kenneth Foote (USA) and Mick Healey (UK). The goal of INLT is to goal to improve the quality and status of learning and teaching of geography in higher education internationally, to share resources and establish a global community of practice in geography higher education. Hay was an early steering committee member of the IGU Commission on Research Methods which he helped to set up to promote an international dialogue on research methods as a vital tool for advancing geographic knowledge and research practices across different regions, countries and traditions. In 2009, he was appointed as expert member for the Australian Curriculum, Assessment and Reporting Authority (ACARA) reference group contributing to the development of the new national geography curriculum. The following year he was seconded to the Australian Learning and Teaching Council (ALTC) as discipline scholar for the arts, social sciences and humanities. In this capacity he collaborated with the Australasian Council of Deans of Arts, Social Sciences and Humanities (DASSH) to develop national academic standards for geography and history, both of which were published in 2010. In 2012, he went on to serve as educator-in-residence at the National University of Singapore, where he delivered the Ruth Wong Memorial Lecture focusing on the teaching practices of inspiring academics.

Hay has held various international, national, and state-level leadership in professional organisations and learned societies, including vice-president (2014 to 2020) and first vice-president (2020 to 2022) of the International Geographical Union (IGU) and president of the Institute of Australian Geographers (IAG) (2010–2012). Currently, he is inaugural director of the RGSSA and chair of the Australian Academy of Science's National Committee for Geographical Sciences. This committee provides leadership and guidance for Australian geography, setting the strategic direction for the discipline. It also act as a link to the global geographical community, ensuring Australia is represented in influential international bodies such as the International Geographical Union. He has also served the international organisation COPE: Committee on Publication Ethics. In 2025 Hay was appointed to the International Science Council's inaugural Committee for Membership.

=== Editorial work ===
Hay has both founded and edited several journals, including roles as editor-in-chief, Geographical Research (2014–2016); co-founder and first Asia-Pacific editor, Ethics, Place and Environment (1998–2010); founding co-editor of International Gambling Studies (2006–09); and foundation Australasian editor, Journal of Geography in Higher Education (1995–2005). He has served on the editorial boards of journals such as ACME; Applied Geography; Erdkunde; Luxury; New Zealand Geographer; Norsk Geografisk Tidsskrift; and Social and Cultural Geography.

In 2024, Hay established the RGSSA's book series Antipodean Perspectives on Geography published by Anthem Press and "dedicated to amplifying the voices and insights of geographers from Australia and New Zealand". Earlier, he established the International Geographical Union's Series on Contemporary Geographies, which he first co-edited with Michael Meadows and now with Holly R. Barcus. He is also editor of the Edward Elgar Publishing How to be an Academic Superhero series, the blueprint for which was his book How to be an Academic Superhero: Establishing and Sustaining a Successful Career in the Social Sciences, Arts and Humanities.

=== Selected lectures ===
- 'A few words to resuscitate Australian Geography', Keynote Address, Australian Geography Teachers' Association 2026 Conference, Canberra, ACT, 2026.
- 'Condition critical: the RGSSA's role in Australian Geography's revival', 51st Brock Memorial Lecture, Royal Geographical Society of South Australia, Adelaide, 2025.
- 'Why voluntary, community-based learned societies matter to the future of geography in Australia', Wiley Plenary Lecture, Institute of Australian Geographers, Adelaide, 2024.
- 'Vital learned societies. The significance of voluntary, community-based learned societies for Australian geography's future', J.P. Thomson Oration, Royal Geographical Society of Queensland, Brisbane, Queensland, 2024.
- 'Opening doors: exploring the teaching practices of inspiring academics', Ruth Wong Memorial Lecture on Education, National University of Singapore, 2012.
- 'On the magic of teaching', The Vice Chancellor's Symposium, Massey University, New Zealand, (Auckland, Wellington and Palmerston North campuses), 2007.
- 'Oppressive geometries? Developing postcolonial power/knowledge arrangements for a global virtual group' Invited Plenary, 1st International Indian Geography Congress, Hyderabad, India, 2006.
- 'Postcolonial practices for a global virtual group – the case of INLT', 2006 Journal of Geography in Higher Education Lecture, International Geographical Union, Brisbane, 2006.

== Publications ==
=== Books ===
- Hay, I. 2024, How to be an Academic Superhero: Establishing and Sustaining a Successful Career in the Social Sciences, Arts and Humanities, 2nd edition, Edward Elgar Publishing, Cheltenham. ISBN 978 1 80392 942 2
- Hay, I. & Allington, P. 2021, Making the Grade. A Guide to Successful Communication and Study, 5th edition, Oxford University Press, Melbourne. ISBN 978-0190323707
- Hay, I. Bochner, D., Blacket, G. & Dungey, C. 2015, Communication Skills Guidebook, Oxford University Press, Melbourne. ISBN 9780190302450
- Hay, I. & Giles, P. 2015, Communicating in Geography and the Environmental Sciences, 2nd Canadian edition, Oxford University Press, Toronto. ISBN 9780199007417
- Hay, I. 2012, Communicating in Geography and the Environmental Sciences, 4th edition, Oxford University Press, Melbourne. ISBN 9780195576757
- Hay, I. Bochner, D., Dungey, C. & Perret, N. 2012, Making the Grade. A Guide to Study and Success. Canadian edition, Oxford University Press, Toronto. ISBN 978-0195443509
- Israel, M. & Hay, I. 2006, Research Ethics for Social Scientists: between ethical conduct and regulatory compliance, Sage, London. ISBN 9781412903905
- Hay, I. 1992, Money, Medicine, and Malpractice in American Society. New York, Praeger. ISBN 9780275939526
- Hay, I. 1989, The Caring Commodity. The Provision of Health Care in New Zealand. Auckland, Oxford University Press. ISBN 9780195581805

=== Edited books ===
- Hay, I., Butler, G. & Szili, G. [Editors] 2024, How to Edit and Manage a Successful Scholarly Journal in the Social Sciences, Arts, and Humanities, Edward Elgar Publishing, Cheltenham. ISBN 978 1 03530 016 7
- Hay, I. & Cope, M. (eds.) 2021, Qualitative Research Methods in Human Geography, 5th edition, Oxford University Press, Toronto. ISBN 9780199034215
- Hay, I. and Beaverstock, J. (eds) 2016, Handbook on Wealth and the Super-Rich, Edward Elgar, London. ISBN 978 1 78347 403 5
- Hay, I. (Ed.) 2013, Teaching Wisdom (Chinese translation of Inspiring Academics. Learning with the World's Best University Teachers, Open University Press, London), McGraw-Hill Education (Asia) and East China Normal University. ISBN 978-7567518940
- Hay, I. (Ed.) 2013, Geographies of the Super-Rich, Edward Elgar, London. ISBN 978 0 85793 568 7
- Hay, I (Ed) (2011), Inspiring Academics. Learning with the World's Best University Teachers, Open University Press, London. ISBN 978-0335237425
- Higgs, J. Sefton, A., Street, A., McAllister, L. & Hay, I. (Eds) 2005, Communicating in the Health and Social Sciences, Oxford University Press, South Melbourne. ISBN 978-0195516982
- Hay, I. (Ed.) 1996, Gender and Environments. Proceedings of the Institute of Australian Geographers' Gender and Geography Study Group Conference held in Adelaide, South Australia, 19–21 April 1996. Institute of Australian Geographers, Adelaide. xii + 144 pp. ISBN 0 9599614 1 0

== Recognition ==
=== Fellowships ===
Hay's scientific and leadership contributions have been acknowledged by Fellowships with, inter alia, the Academy of Social Sciences (UK), American Association of Geographers, Australian College of Educators, Institute of Australian Geographers, New Zealand Geographical Society, Royal Historical Society (UK), Royal Society of South Australia, and as Principal Fellow of the Higher Education Academy. His contributions to academic and organisational leadership have been recognised through Fellowships with the Australian Institute of Company Directors, Institute of Managers and Leaders Australia and New Zealand, and Life Fellowship of the Governor's Leadership Foundation within the Leaders' Institute of South Australia).

=== National and international awards ===
- 2024 The IGU Laureat d'Honneur (International Geographical Union) This award for "service to the discipline at the international, national and local scales" described Hay as "an accomplished influencer and knowledge provocateur whose impacts on Geography over more than three decades have been innovative, cumulative and far-reaching internationally."
- 2024 The J.P. Thomson Medal (Royal Geographical Society of Queensland)
- 2022 Australia-International Medal (Institute of Australian Geographers)
- 2021 Geoethics Medal, International Association for Promoting Geoethics
- 2020 Rachel Carson Fellowship (Ludwig-Maximilians-Universität München)
- 2018 American Association of Geographers' Gilbert Grosvenor Geographic Education Honors "Dr Hay's scholarly production has shaped undergraduate geography education and faculty training around the world" according to the AAG.
- 2016 Massey University Distinguished Alumni Achievement Award, NZ
- 2012 Educator-in-Residence, National University of Singapore
- 2011 Distinguished New Zealand Geographer Medal, NZ Geographical Society
- 2010 Association of American Geographers E. Willard and Ruby S. Miller Award, for "international leadership in geographic education, heightening the profile of geography and global education, facilitating and institutionalizing networks of academics and educators, and enhancing teaching and learning in K-12 and university geography around the world."
- 2009 Taylor and Francis Award of the Royal Geographical Society with the Institute of British Geographers
- 2008 Australian Geography Teachers Association (AGTA) Award
- 2006 Prime Minister's Award for Australian University Teacher of the Year
- 2006 Carrick Award for Australian University Teaching Excellence (Social Sciences)
- 2006 Carrick Australian Awards for University Teaching Citation for Outstanding Contribution to Student Learning "For sustained leadership and scholarship dedicated to improving the quality of geography learning and teaching within Australia and internationally."
