= Royal Geographical Society of Australasia =

The Royal Geographical Society of Australasia, formerly the Geographical Society of Australasia, was an Australian organisation formed in 1883 until it split up into various state organisations in the 1920s.

The South Australian and Queensland branches continue as the Royal Geographical Society of South Australia (RGSSA) and Royal Geographical Society of Queensland (RGSAQ) respectively.

== History ==
On 22 June 1883, the Geographical Society of Australasia started at a meeting in Sydney, New South Wales, Australia. A branch was formed in Victoria in the same year. In July 1885, both the Queensland and the South Australian branches started.

In July 1886 the society became the Royal Geographical Society of Australasia. The New South Wales branch's new constitution in 1886 widened its scope to encourage interest in scientific, commercial, educational and historical aspects of geography. The Society sponsored several important expeditions, notably the New Guinea Exploration Expedition in 1885, whose members included zoologist Wilhelm Haacke, erstwhile director of the South Australian Museum.

The Victorian branch amalgamated with the Victorian Historical Society, while the New South Wales branch had ceased to function by the early 1920s.

The South Australian and Queensland branches continue as the Royal Geographical Society of South Australia and Royal Geographical Society of Queensland respectively.

== Queensland ==
The Queensland Branch (RGSAQ) was established in 1885.

=== Great Barrier Reef Committee ===
In 1922 the RGSAQ formed the Great Barrier Reef Committee, instigated by Henry C. Richards, geology professor at the University of Queensland, and Matthew Nathan, Governor of Queensland.)

In 1924 the committee became an independent organisation, which it remained until 1982, supported by the Queensland Government and the Universities of Queensland and Sydney. Members were by invitation only, drawn from academics at universities, scientific societies, and government organisations, including the RGSAQ, the Queensland Museum, the Queensland Naturalists Club, and the Royal Zoological Society of New South Wales. It ran scientific research programs and expeditions on the Great Barrier Reef. It established the Heron Island Research Station in 1951, which was the first marine research station on the reef. The committed was incorporated in 1957 and membership was by subscription. From 1983 it underwent restructuring, and was renamed the Australian Coral Reef Society.

== South Australia ==
The South Australian branch (RGSSA) was formed on 10 July 1885. In 1905 they acquired the York Gate Library, following the death of Stephen William Silver a prosperous London merchant who had branched out into publishing information for colonial settlers alongside clothes, furniture and other equipment for use in the British colonies.

=== Expedition sponsorship ===
The South Australian branch played a part in organising a number of expeditions. These included:

- Tietkens expedition of 1889, territory west of Alice Springs to the Western Australian border
- Elder Scientific Exploring Expedition, 1891, country between Warrina, South Australia, and the Western Australian coast
- Calvert Scientific Exploring Expedition, 1896—1897, central and northern Western Australia

=== Members of the RGSSA ===
The founding members were:

- His Honor the Chief Justice S. J. Way
- Sir Henry Ayers, KCMG. (President of the Legislative Council)
- Sir Samuel Davenport
- Sir Thomas Elder
- Hons. George W. Cotton
- David Murray
- Henry Scott
- Robert Alfred Tarlton, M.L.C.
- Bishop Kennion, D.D.
- Archdeacon Farr, M.A., LLD, Rev. F. Williams, M.A.
- Peter Egerton-Warburton
- F. E. H. W. Krichauff, M.P.
- Edwin Thomas Smith, M.P.
- William Bundey (Mayor of Adelaide)
- J. A. Hartley, B.A., B.Sc. (lnspector-General of Schools)
- James W. Jones (Conservator of Water)
- J. Langdon Bonython
- J. F. Conigrave
- T. Evans Jr.
- William Everard
- Tom Gill
- C. Hope Harris
- E. Holthouse
- A. T. Magarey
- C. M. McKillop F.R.G.S.
- C. J. Sanders
- Samuel Tomkinson
- W. H. Tietkens, F.R.G.S.
- W. B. Wilkinson
- Thomas Worsnop
- F. S. Wallis

Later prominent members were:

- Simpson Newland (president 1895–1900 and 1920–1922)
- Anna Friederich, elected to the Victorian Branch in 1892.
- A. M. Simpson
- A. A. Simpson (president 1925–1930)
- John Lewis (president 1913–1920)
- A. W. Piper KC (president 1910–1913)
- Clive M. Hambidge (president 1944–1947).
- T. S. Reed (secretary 1903–1914)
- F. L. Parker (secretary 1922–1932; president 1934–1936)
- A. A. Lendon MD.

== See also ==
- List of Australian organisations with royal patronage
