= Stephen Winckworth Silver =

English businessman (1790–1855)

- Born: February 26, 1790; Winchester, England
- Died: October 4, 1855 (aged 65)
- Occupation: Businessman
- Known for: Established a campaign and exploration equipment company
- Spouse: Frances Susan Adams (m. 1812)
- Children: 11

Stephen Winkworth Silver (26 February 1790, in Winchester – 1855) was a London business man who established a company specialised in providing campaign and exploration equipment. They also acted as army and colonial agents, as well as shipping agents.

He took over and developed S. W. Silver and Co., the second shirt-making business in London, which had been established in 1794.

== Family life ==
Stephen was the son of Stephen Silver and Elizabeth Finch. His paternal grandmother was Sarah Winckworth. His father was a draper in Winchester who died in 1794. His mother remarried to John Hayter in 1799, and his step brother, George Hayter, was born in 1803.

Stephen moved to London, where he married Frances Susan Adams, from Barnstaple, Devon, on 1 February 1812. In later years, they lived at 5 Circus Road. Stephen & Frances Susan had eleven children: Frances Silver, wife of Francis "Frank" Hockin (1813-1893), Alexander Frederick Silver (1814-1820), Elizabeth Smyth Silver, wife of the Rev. George Chute (1817-1862), Stephen William Silver (1819-1905), Frederick Silver (1821-1884), Marianne Nine Silver (1823-1849), Colonel Hugh Adams Silver (1825-1912), Walter Finch Silver (1827-1847), Edgar Silver (1829-1905), Jessie Silver (1831-1892) and Septimus Silver (1833-1854). Sons Stephen and Hugh joined S.W.Silver & Co. and Edgar became a perpetual curate in the Church of England.

On 4 Oct 1855, Stephen died at Carshalton, Surrey, "in the 66th year of his age, after a painful illness, borne with the greatest submission". His wife, Frances Susan, died on 19 Nov 1869 and was buried at the side of her husband in the cemetery at St John's Hampstead, Camden (along with three of their children).
