= Hooper's Telegraph Works =

19th century London business

The Hooper's Telegraph Works Ltd was established by William Hooper in 1870 to manufacture and lay submarine communications cable using his patented vulcanized rubber core. Before the company was formed to produce finished submarine cable Hooper had furnished core for other companies, particularly that of William Thomas Henley, to armor and sheathe. The original core works were located at Mitcham, London with the later complete cable, core with external sheathing, production located and later consolidated at Millwall and the company renamed Hooper's Telegraph Works. (Note: The inner portion of submarine cable containing the conductors around which additional protections would be applied. At first Hooper's only made the core.)

The company was placed into liquidation in 1877 and operated as a private company until, after Hooper's death in 1888 the company was again operating as a privately subscribed, limited company. By 1894 the company was trading as Hooper's Telegraph and India Rubber Works Ltd.

== Cable ==
The company's major operations concerned submarine cables but it and William Hooper's earlier cable core manufacturing business also made cable for surface use, including military use for field telegraph communications. The Hooper core was also used for indoor circuits.

The company's first large submarine cable order was from Great Northern Telegraph Company for a 2,300 nmi (2,600 mi; 4,300 km) nautical mile cable linking Vladivostok with Hong Kong, via Shanghai. Hooper's rubber goods factory had previously been contracted by the Indian government to produce 12 nmi (14 mi; 22 km) of insulated cable and another contract producing cable to link India and Ceylon. The cable ship (CS) Great Northern, (Note: Built by Denton Gray and Company, West Hartlepool, 1870, 1,422 GRT) purchased by Hooper's in 1871, with four cable tanks, two bow sheaves and cable laying machinery for laying the 1871 Vladivostok - Nagasaki - Shanghai - Hong Kong cable.

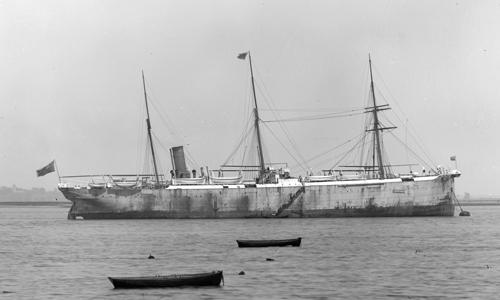
CS Hooper pictured here as CS Silvertown in 1901 after sale and renaming in 1881.

The company had considered a trans Atlantic cable from England the United States via Bermuda and ordered a ship capable of carrying the entire cable proposed for the England-Bermuda segment. The ship was to be named Great Western but the cable plan was abandoned, with cable and ship completed, in favor of a cable on the east coast of South America with a new company, the Western and Brazilian Telegraph Company, and the ship renamed CS Hooper. (Note: Built by C. Mitchell and Co., Newcastle, 1873, 4,935 GRT. Sold 1881 to India Rubber, Gutta Percha and Telegraph Works Company and renamed Silvertown which was active in cable work through 1913. Silvertown began the trans Pacific cable at San Francisco for the Commercial Pacific Cable Company in 1902.) The ship, second to be designed as a cable ship, was second in size at the time only to SS Great Eastern. Hooper was launched 29 March 1873 after four and a half months construction, noted as the first ship designed specifically to lay Atlantic cable, with three cable tanks 32 ft (9.8 m) in depth and 46 ft (14.0 m), 53 ft (16.2 m) and 51 ft (15.5 m) in diameter with 88,900 cubic feet (2,517.4 m^{3}) storage capacity. The ship laid cable linking Pará-Maranham-Ceara-Pernambuco-Bahia-Rio de Janeiro in 1873.

In connection with a cable linking Europe to Brazil Hooper's became involved in a lawsuit, Menier v. Hooper's Telegraph Works (Limited), that set precedent concerning the rights of minority shareholders. The European Telegraph Company, in which Hooper's owned a majority of shares, was formed to lay a cable linking Portugal and Brazil under a concession granted by Brazil and other governments. Hooper's held 3,000 shares, Emile Justin Menier held 2,000 and Baron de Mauá, a director of the company, held 25 shares. Others held 300 shares. Hooper's was to supply the cable but found it would be more profitable to supply cable to a rival company and concession formed around Baron de Mauá. Hoopers used its majority position to annul the European Telegraph Company's concession in favor of the new company and, when the European Telegraph Company sued, used its majority position to have the suit abandoned and the company dissolved. Menier filed against Baron de Mauá and Hooper's Telegraph Works for its profits from those dealings. His suit was successful and the actions of Hooper's Telegraph Workswere found to amount to blatant and fraudulent appropriation of property.

Cables were laid in the Caribbean area and then the company attempted to gain investors for a South African cable but failed.
