= F. L. Parker =

Australian public servant

Ferdinand Lucas Parker (11 July 1885 – 1959) was a South Australian public servant, clerk of the House of Assembly.

== History ==
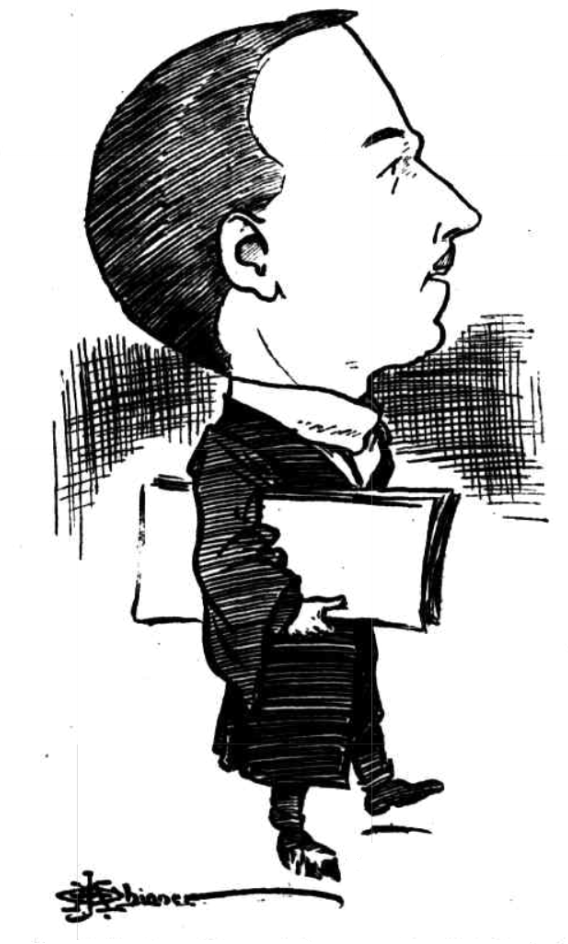
caricature by J. H. Chinner

Parker was born in Ovingham, South Australia to Henry George Parker (c. 1849 – 6 July 1933) and Louise Eleanor Parker (c. 1856 – 27 February 1934) of Buxton Street, North Adelaide. He was educated at Dryburgh House School and Whinham College. In April 1901 he joined the State public service as a clerk in the Chief Secretary's department, and for many years handled all questions, papers, messages and reports for Parliament, gaining a good working knowledge of procedure. In 1906 he studied business practice at the University of Adelaide. In 1908 he and H. C. Gittins were clerks of the House of Assembly under T. W. Green, Chief Clerk.

He joined the 10th Australian Infantry Regiment of the citizens' forces, and in August 1909 was promoted to second lieutenant, and lieutenant in March 1912. He transferred to the 79th in July 1912 and made captain in January 1913. He enlisted for overseas service and appointed supply officer with the rank of captain in the Second Light Horse Brigade, and left Adelaide in October 1914 with the second expeditionary force. He served at Gallipoli and was among the last to leave the Peninsula, attached to the Anzac Mounted Division in Palestine. He was involuntarily returned to Australia in January 1916 due to some unspecified irregularities, but was not charged with any offence and received the appropriate war medals.

He is reported as being appointed chief clerk of the Chief Secretary's Department in 1915. If so, it was in absentia, as Parker was in Gallipoli and Palestine and could not have returned until early to mid-1916. In 1916 Vaughan disbanded the Premier's Department, and in the reorganisation Parker was appointed chief clerk and accountant of the Police Department in succession to Giles, who had recently been promoted to secretary to the Commissioner of Police.

In March 1918 he was transferred as office clerk to the House of Assembly. In May 1920, when J. P. Morice was promoted to Clerk of the Legislative Council, Parker succeeded him as Assistant Clerk and Sergeant-at-Arms of the Assembly.

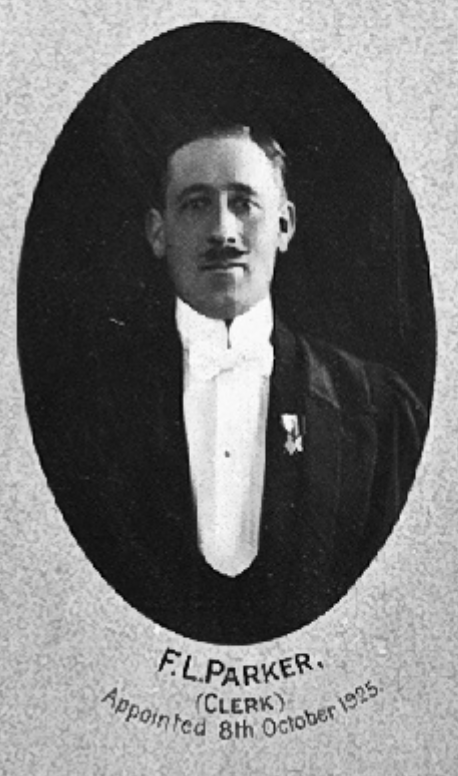
Ferdinand L. Parker in 1925.

He was appointed Clerk of the House of Assembly in October 1925.

In 1937 he was given the added title and responsibility of Clerk of Parliaments.

He retired in 1953 and was succeeded by G. D. Combe.

== Publications ==
- He was the author of an article on secession of Western Australia.
- He was author of a history of the State published by the Society.

== Other interests ==
- He was a prominent member of the South Australian branch of the Royal Geographical Society; secretary 1922–1932, president 1934–1936, and in 1936 the Society's representative on the board of the State library, Museum and Art Gallery.
- He was a founding member of the South Australian branch of the Empire Parliamentary Association, its longtime secretary and their delegate to London in 1948.
- He was in 1928 a founding member of the Adelaide Constitutional Club and served a term as both treasurer and president.
- He maintained a large collection of photographs of notable men and women.

== Recognition ==
- Parker was the subject of a newspaper photographic study "Then and Now" and caricatures on three occasions: by Chinner in 1925 (above) and Lionel Coventry (1906–1986), in 1945 and 1949.
- Centenary photographs of Members of the House of Assembly, 1936

== Family ==
Parker married Kathleen Ruth Isaachsen in 1916. Their family included at least one son:

- George Lucas Parker (9 February 1918 – 24 November 2007) married Joyce Symons in July 1943. An architect, specialising in hotels and commercial kitchens, he designed the Hotel Adelaide at North Adelaide.

== Resources ==
- [Biographical cuttings on Ferdinand Lucas Parker, noted in the Royal Geographical Society of Australia, South Australian Branch, December 1959. p. 127-128, containing one or more cuttings from newspapers or journals], 1900 not yet accessed for this article.
- "Parker, F. L. (Ferdinand Lucas) (1885-1959)", Trove, 2008 List of journal articles; not yet accessed.
