= Commonwealth Club of Adelaide =

The Commonwealth Club of Adelaide was a South Australian men's social club, whose members were mostly high-ranking officials, successful businessmen and professionals. The club never had rooms of its own, but met once a month for a catered lunch in one or other of Adelaide's large cafes (Bricknell's, Balfour's or Bishop's) or, for high-profile guest speakers, the Adelaide Town Hall. Meetings consisted mostly of talks by members or guest speakers, followed by discussions and socializing. As with most service clubs, talks and discussions were expected to be non-sectarian in religion and non-partisan in politics. The club was formed as a result of a meeting called for March 1910 at the Adelaide Town Hall by S. H. Skipper, a popular Adelaide barrister, and son of journalist Spencer Skipper.

Famous figures who addressed the Club include Oscar Asche, Lord Baden-Powell, Colin Bednall, Lord Bruce, W. W. Campbell (of Lick Observatory), Noël Coward, Alfred Deakin, Anthony Eden, Andrew Fisher, Bert Hinkler, William Morris Hughes, Sir Harry Lauder, Douglas Mawson, Field-Marshal Lord Montgomery, Sir Ross Smith and Sir Keith Smith, G. S. Titheradge, Sir Archibald Weigall, G. H. Wilkins.

== History ==
Club year April–	President	Secretary	Members	Notes
1910	Sir John Gordon	S. H. Skipper	—	
1911	Sir John Gordon	Skipper	224	
1912	Sir Charles Goode	Skipper	286	
1913	Sir John Downer	Skipper	306	
1914	Downer	Skipper	484	
1915	Sir John Downer	Skipper	588	Guests inc. 60 members of BAAS
1916	W. B. Wilkinson	Skipper	568	
1917	Wilkinson	Skipper		Skipper enlisted with AIF in July
1918	W. B. Wilkinson	John Hayter Reed (Note: John Hayter Reed (c. 1866–1934) was a banker and Red Cross executive.)	594	
1919	A. A. Lendon	Reed	592	
1920	A. A. Lendon	Skipper	676	
1921	F. W. Richards KC	W. Fowler-Brownworth	750	
1922	F. W. Richards KC	W. Fowler-Brownworth	788	
1923	S. H. Skipper	E. C. Harvey (Note: Eric Charles Harvey (died 11 December 1937) was an Adelaide accountant about whom little has been found.)	929	
1924	Skipper	Harvey	913	
1925	Skipper	Harvey	934	
1926	S. H. Skipper	Harvey	922	
1927	J. B. Hughes	Harvey	970	
1928	S. Price Weir	Percy H. Andrews (Note: Percival Henry Andrews (1879–1950) was an accountant.)	1,014	
1929	J. G. Sinclair	Andrews	1,058	
1930	Andrew D. Young	Andrews	1,017	
1931	S. W. Jeffries	Andrews	1,004	
1932	R. L. Leane	Andrews	965	nett loss £27/8/8
1933	G. I. B. Sheridan	Andrews		
1934	Charles Buxton Anderson	Andrews	929	
1935	Reg Walker	Andrews		
1936	George Ernest Willson	Andrews	975	
1937	Benjamin Hill Gillman	Andrews	1,000+	
1938	E. L. Bean (Note: Edgar Layton Bean ( – ) was a lawyer, Parliamentary Draftsman and chairman of the Police Appeals Board)	Andrews	956	net loss £6/1/5
1939	Edwin Henry Peake	Andrews		
1940	G. S. Reed	Andrews	1018	
1941	A. Grenfell Price	Andrews		
1942	Sir Herbert Hudd	Andrews		
1943	J. Wallace Sandford	Andrews		
1944	Don Bradman	Andrews	1,222	
1945	Charles Duguid	Andrews	1,138	
1946	Douglas Mawson	Andrews	1,125	
1947	Sidney Powell (Note: Sidney Powell was an Adelaide accountant and company director, president of the Adelaide Chamber of Commerce 1940–42, and Associated Chambers of Commerce of Australia 1953–4.)	Andrews	1104	
1948	Ewen M. Waterman	Percy H. Andrews	1155	Andrews resigned
1949	R. F. Middleton (Note: Roy Foster Middleton (1889–) was businessman and fine cricketer, chairman of the cricket board of control from 1952.)	Lance Milne	1218	
1950	R. R. Chamberlain KC (Note: Reginald Roderick St Clair Chamberlain KC was appointed Crown Solicitor in 1928)	Milne		
1951	R. H. Chapman (Note: Robert Hall Chapman (1890–1953) was an engineer, son of Professor R. W. Chapman. He designed the railway bridge at Murray Bridge, became Railways Commissioner in 1947.)			
1952	Roland E. Jacobs		1,195	
1953	G. C. Ligertwood		1,106	
1954	G. S. McDonald			Meeting 10 May not reported
1955				
1956				
1957				
1958				
1959				
1960				
