= William Hooper (chemist) =

British chemist

William Hooper (1817 or 1818 – 25 September 1877) was a British chemist.

Hooper set up a factory in 1845 at the old Mitcham Workhouse, on Mitcham Common. His first products were rubber goods, mostly for the medical profession. Experiments were carried out for insulating electric cables using rubber, and he devised a continuous manufacturing process for this. Hooper established Hooper's Telegraph Works, a limited company based in London's Millwall Docks with a factory on Mitcham Common. The company went into liquidation in 1877, with Hooper dying a year later at the age of sixty.
