= William Birkinshaw Wilkinson =

William Birkinshaw Wilkinson (23 May 1854 – 11 January 1927), commonly referred to as W. B. Wilkinson, was a South Australian businessman, a member of the Royal Geographical Society.

== History ==
Born and educated in England, Wilkinson emigrated from Pendleton, City of Salford to South Australia around 1875 after his doctor ordered him to seek a warmer climate. On arrival, he found employment with the National Bank of Australasia, and a year later joined John Francis Davey in founding Davey & Wilkinson of Redhill and Crystal Brook. After three years, Davey retired and the firm became part of Ferry, Moore, and Wilkinson. In 1879 Wilkinson moved to Adelaide to manage the company's head office. He embarked on a world tour between 1882 and 1884, and on his return became senior partner in a firm titled Wilkinson, Harrison, & Porter with Walter Harrison and W. Hedley R. Porter, whom he knew from his days with the National Bank. In 1895 he left for London, where he stayed for six years, running the firm's London office. He founded the Australasian Club in London, and became its chairman. Health failing, he returned to Adelaide, joined the Stock Exchange, and started a real estate business, which became Wilkinson, Sando, and Wyles, Limited. He retired in 1922.

He was elected a Fellow of the Royal Geographical Society while in England, and was the sole surviving member of the original council of the South Australian branch. He was also a member of the council and a past President. Up to the time of his retirement 1922, Wilkinson had held the following offices at various times:—

- councillor for Robe ward, in the Adelaide City Council
- president of the General Employers Union
- president and a founder the Licensed Land Brokers and Auctioneer' Association
- president and a founder of the North Adelaide branch of the Liberal Union
- member of the Board of Governors of the Public Library, Museum, and Art Gallery
- chairman and trustee of the Kindergarten Union
- member of the executive and past chairman of St. John Ambulance Association
- founder, past President, and member of the executive of the Commonwealth Club of Adelaide
- member of the executive and honorary treasurer of the Queen's Home
- founder and member of the executive of the Town Planning Association

During the war Wilkinson held the offices of president of the North Adelaide circle of the Australian Division (men's section) of the British Red Cross Society and president of the Men's Tobacco Auxiliary (South Australian division) of the Australian Comforts Fund.

He died at his home at 61 Molesworth Street, North Adelaide.

== Recognition ==
Wilkinson Lane, Beulah Park was named for him (his company subdivided part of section 288 in 1914).

== Family ==
On 4 August 1886 W. B. Wilkinson married Emily Jane Mathilde "Lily" Peterswald, a daughter of William John Peterswald (c. 1829 – 30 August 1896), ex-Commissioner of Police. Among their children were:

- Keith Wilkinson
- Ross Wilkinson
- Irene de St. Croix Wilkinson married (Arden) Seymour Hawker of "Bungaree", Clare on 20 July 1910, later lived at 51 Pennington Terrace, North Adelaide.
