= Hugh Silver =

English businessman and civil engineer (1825–1912)

Hugh Adams Silver (14 July, 1825 St John's Wood – 27 March, 1912) was an English businessman, civil engineer and military officer.

== Life ==
He founded the India Rubber, Gutta Percha and Telegraph Works in Silvertown, East London in 1864. He became an associate of the Institution of Civil Engineers in 1861. He was responsible for giving ebonite its name. He founded and equipped the 9th (Silvertown) Essex Rifle Volunteer Corps and was its commander with the rank of colonel.

From c.1876 he lived in Lubbock Road, Chislehurst, Kent.

== Family ==
He was the son of Stephen Winckworth Silver (26 February 1790 - 4 October 1855) founder of S. W. Silver and Company, and his wife Frances Susan nee Adams.

He married twice: firstly on 27 September 1849 to Annie Ellen Daniels (who died 25 October 1876); and secondly to Anne Cornish on 30 June 1879 at Eaton Square, Pimlico. He and his first wife had eleven children. He and his second wife had one daughter and two sons.
