= Stephen William Silver =

Stephen William Silver was born to Stephen Winckworth Silver and his wife, Frances Susan Adams, on 7 May 1817. He was a brother of Hugh Silver. They were London merchants, who took over running S. W. Silver and Co. from their father in 1846. He was responsible for developing the company's industrial presence in the area to the west of North Woolwich, which became known as Silvertown, taking its name from the company.

Stephen married Ellen Warlters on 5 February 1852 and Sarah Constance Miles on 13 May 1875. He had a son, Stephen William Miles Silver.

He resided at 3 York Gate, located at an entrance to Regent's Park. Here, he housed his considerable library, which became known as the York Gate Library.

About 1879, he also bought a 6,000 acres (2,400 ha) property, renamed as Silverhope, in New Zealand, and his New Zealand bird collection (catalogued by Sir Walter Buller) is in Oxford University Museum of Natural History.

He died, after a brief cold, at the country home he bought in 1886, Letcombe Manor, Letcombe Regis, on 7 April 1905. His wife, Sarah, died in 1908. He left an estate of £83,462.
