= Submarine Telegraph Company =

British submarine telegraph cable company

The Submarine Telegraph Company was a British company which laid and operated submarine telegraph cables.

Jacob and John Watkins Brett formed the English Channel Submarine Telegraph Company to lay the first cable across the English Channel. An unarmoured cable with gutta-percha insulation was laid in 1850. The recently introduced gutta-percha was the first thermoplastic material available to cable makers and was resistant to seawater. This first unarmoured cable was a failure and was soon broken either by a French fishing boat or by abrasion on the rocks off the French coast.

The Bretts formed a new company, the Submarine Telegraph Company, and laid a new cable in 1851. This cable had multiple conductors and iron wire armouring. Telegraph communication with France was established for the first time in October of that year. This was the first undersea telegraph cable to be put in service anywhere in the world.

The company continued to lay, and operate, more cables between England and the Continent until they were nationalised in 1890. Through a series of mergers they ultimately became part of Cable & Wireless (CW). The Times commemorated the 50th anniversary of the cable in 1900; CW and the Science Museum, London did the same on the 100th anniversary in 1950.

== History ==
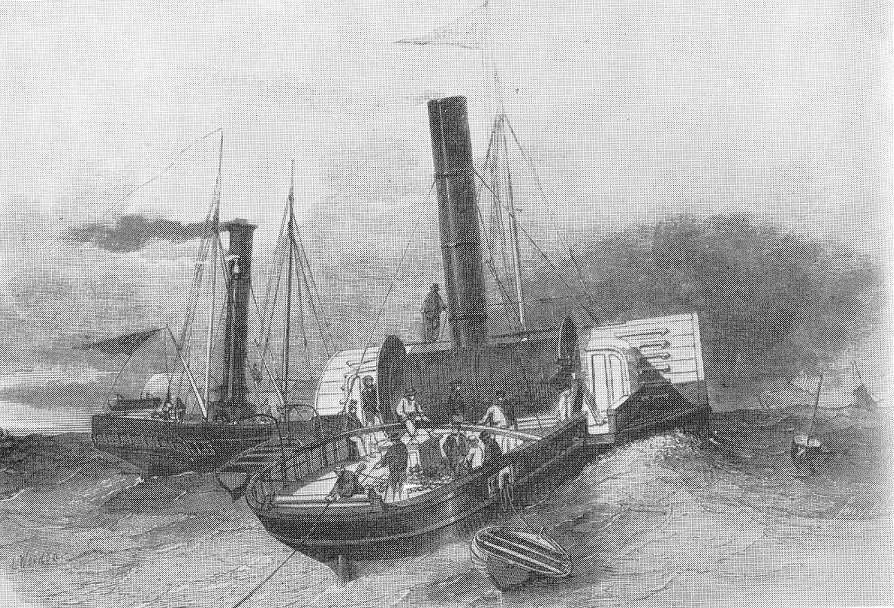
Goliath laying the 1850 cable

In 1847, the Bretts obtained a concession from the French government to lay and operate a submarine telegraph cable across the Channel. The concession lapsed without anything being achieved. A proof of principle was conducted in 1849 by Charles Vincent Walker of the South Eastern Railway using gutta-percha insulated cable. Gutta-percha, recently introduced by William Montgomerie for making medical equipment, was a natural rubber that was found to be ideal for insulating ocean cables. Walker laid two miles (3.2 km) of the cable from the ship Princess Clementine off the coast of Folkestone. With the other end connected to the railway telegraph lines, he successfully sent telegraph messages from the ship to London. At the conclusion of the experiment, South Eastern Railway reused the cable in a wet railway tunnel.

In the same year, the Bretts had the Channel concession renewed for ten years, but only on condition that communication was established by September 1850. The English Channel Submarine Telegraph Company was formed to carry out this task. The Gutta Percha Company was contracted to manufacture the cable. A paddle tug, Goliath was chartered for cable laying. Goliath transported the cable from the manufacturing plant in Greenwich to Dover in short lengths which were then spliced together onto a single drum.

Winding the cable onto the drum took some time. The individual lengths were retested in water at Dover quayside and repaired as necessary before joining on the drum. Unattended cable suffered from the attentions of souvenir hunters who cut off pieces, or stripped the insulation to confirm to themselves that there was copper inside. It was difficult to wind the cable evenly on the drum because the joints caused bulges and because the manufacturing process did not produce perfectly regular cable. Cotton packing and wooden slats were used to smooth out the unevenness, slowing the process even further.

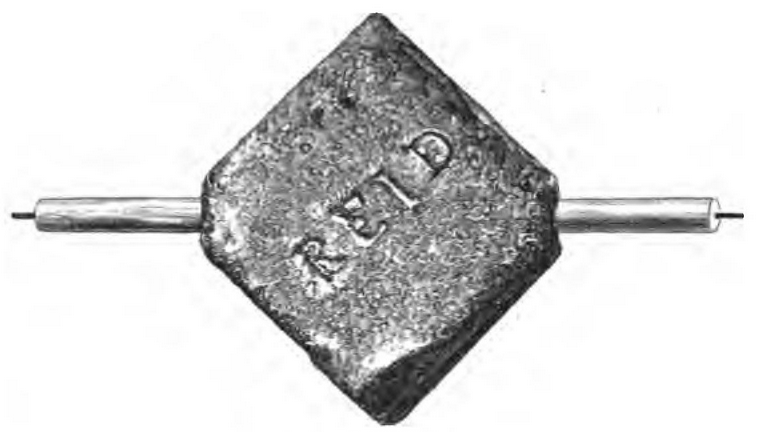
A lead weight from the 1850 cable

Goliath laid the cable between Dover and Cap Gris Nez in France on 28 August 1850. Unlike later submarine cables, this one had no armouring to protect it: the single copper wire was protected only by the layer of gutta-percha insulation around it. This made it very light, and it was necessary to attach lead weights at intervals to make it sink. Messages sent across the cable were unintelligible due to dispersion of the signal, a phenomenon which was not understood at the time, and would be an even greater problem on the first transatlantic telegraph cable; dispersion was not fully solved on submarine cables until loading started to be used at the beginning of the 20th century. Both ends of the communication assumed that the messages did not make sense because the other end was in the midst of drunken celebrations of their success. It was decided to try again in the morning, but during the night the cable failed. Initial reports stated that cable was damaged where it passed over rocks near Cap Gris Nez, but later French fishermen were blamed. The cable was never put back into service. While it is certainly true that French fishing boats recovered lengths of the cable hauled up in their nets, and in some cases cut the cable to free their gear, it remains unclear if this was the initial cause of the failure. A story circulated much later (from 1865) that the fisherman who initially cut the cable thought it was a new species of seaweed with gold in its centre. Although this story is still found in modern sources, it is likely apocryphal.

=== First working undersea cable ===
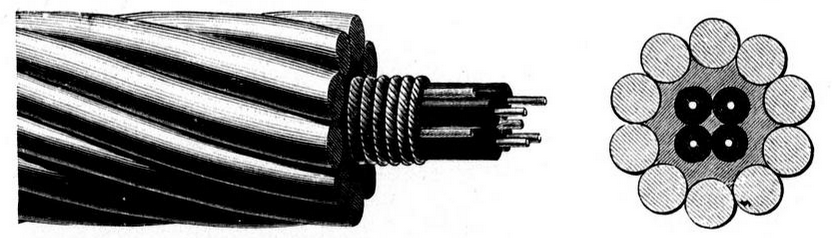
Construction of the 1851 Dover–Calais cable

The Bretts renewed their concession with a new date for establishing communication of October 1851. The company was reformed as the Submarine Telegraph Company in order to raise new capital. The largest investor was railway engineer Thomas Russell Crampton, who was put in charge of ordering the new cable, and specified a much improved cable. The core of the new cable, again made by the Gutta Percha Company, was to have four conductors, substantially increasing the potential traffic, and insulated with gutta-percha as before. However, the four separate insulated conductors were not laid into a single cable by the Gutta Percha Company. This task was given to a wire-rope making company, Wilkins and Wetherly, who armoured the cable with an outer layer of helically laid iron wires. Production was halted for a time due to a dispute with R.S. Newall and Company of Gateshead. Newall had a patent for manufacturing wire rope with a soft core to make it more flexible, and claimed that this submarine cable breached that patent. The issue was resolved by allowing Newall to take over production of the cable at Wilkins and Wetherly's Wapping premises.

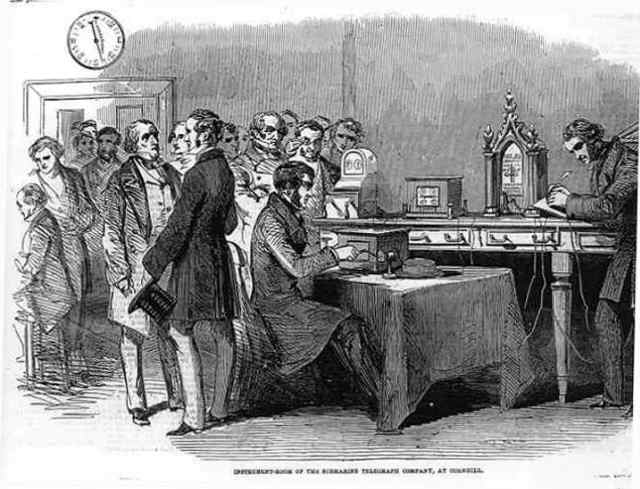
The first message being received from France. The telegraph instrument in the foreground is the Foy-Breguet telegraph to exchange messages with France. The instrument in the background is a Cooke and Wheatstone telegraph for onward transmission in England.

The completed cable was 25 nautical miles (46 km; 29 mi) long, far longer and heavier than anything the rope makers had previously manufactured, and there was some difficulty getting the cable out of the Wapping premises. There was no easy access and the adjacent business refused permission to cross their property, thinking that electrical apparatus would invalidate their fire insurance. However, a neighbouring business granted access, but the cable still had to be manually hauled to a wharf on the River Thames. This was a difficult task which had to frequently be halted to tie back protruding broken iron wires. At the river, the cable was loaded on to the Blazer, a hulk loaned to the Submarine Telegraph Company by the government.

The cable was laid between South Foreland and Sangatte by Blazer under tow from two tugs on 25 September 1851. The cable ran out a mile (1.6 km) before reaching Sangatte. As a temporary measure, a length of unarmoured cable used for the underground link from Sangatte to Calais was spliced on to enable the ocean cable to be landed. The telegraph station on the English side was in a private house in Dover. At first, they could not contact France, but soon discovered that the problem was not with the submarine cable: a joint had been omitted in the underground cable between South Foreland and Dover. Telegraph communication between Britain and France was established for the first time on 15 October.

In October, the steam tug Red Rover was tasked with replacing the temporary cable with a new section of armoured cable. The first attempt was abandoned after running into bad weather. Trying again, it was discovered that there was no one on board who knew how to find Sangatte. They arrived a day late and missed their rendezvous with HMS Widgeon which was tasked with making the splice at sea. The cable was finally landed and the splice made aboard Widgeon on 19 October.

The line was finally open to the public on 19 November 1851. The occasion was marked by setting off an electrical fuse over the telegraph from Dover to fire a cannon in Calais. In reply, Calais fired a cannon in Dover Castle. The opening had again missed the French government deadline, but the concession was nevertheless renewed on 23 October for ten years from that date. The cable remained in service with the Submarine Telegraph Company for the lifetime of the company. This was the first undersea submarine cable put into service. Werner von Siemens had used gutta-percha-insulated cable to cross the Rhine in 1847 and Kiel Harbour in 1848, but this was the first working undersea cable to link two countries.

=== Manufacturing problems ===
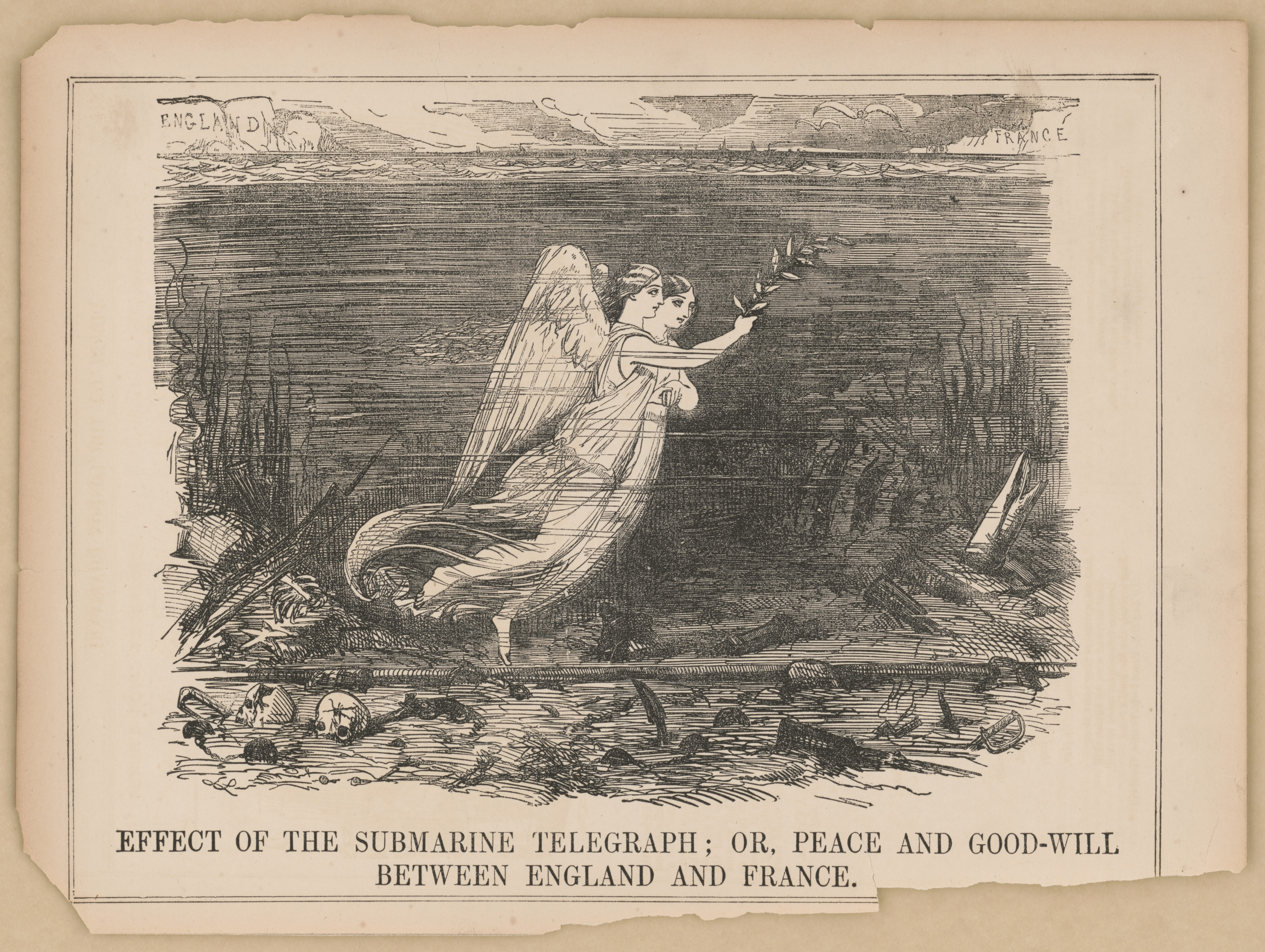
"Effect of the submarine telegraph; or peace and good-will between England and France"

Early submarine cables had numerous quality problems. The insulation was not applied evenly leading to variations in the cable diameter and shape. The conductor was not held on the centreline of the insulation, in places coming close to the surface making it easy for the conductor to become exposed. The insulation was full of air pockets due to the gutta-percha being applied in one thick coat instead of several thinner coats. All these issues with the insulation caused inconsistencies in the electrical properties of the cable.

Quality of the conductor was also inconsistent. The diameter of the copper was variable, again leading to inconsistent electrical properties. There was little experience with annealing long lengths of copper. This resulted in inconsistent mechanical properties with brittle portions in the wire.

An even bigger problem was caused by the joints. The copper wire was supplied in short, inconsistent, lengths. Initially on the 1850 cable, joints were attempted by brazing a scarf joint with hard solder. However, the heat from the blowpipe softened the gutta-percha which became plastic and dripped off the cable. An alternative method was therefore used. Two inches of insulation was stripped from each end, the exposed wires twisted together and soft soldered. Sheets of gutta-percha heated to a plastic state were then wrapped around the joint and clamped in a mould. This resulted in a cigar-shaped bulge around the joint which was undesirable for cable laying.

=== Nationalisation ===
The Submarine Telegraph Company went on to lay many more cables between Britain and the continent. In 1870 the inland telegraphs in Britain were nationalised, and in 1890 the cables and other assets of the Submarine Telegraph Company were taken over by the General Post Office.

== List of cables laid ==
List of cables laid by the Submarine Telegraph Company
Year	Route	Cable ship	Cable manufacturer*	Notes
1851	South Foreland to Sangatte	Blazer	Wilkins and Weatherly/R.S. Newall and Company	First undersea submarine cable in service
1853	Dover to Ostend	William Hutt	R.S. Newall and Company	Six-core cable of same construction as the 1851 four-core
1858	Cromer to Emden	William Cory	Glass, Elliot & Company	
1859	Cromer to Heligoland	William Cory		
1859	Heligoland to Denmark	Berwick		
1859	Abbotscliff (Capel-le-Ferne) to Gris Nez	Berwick		
1859	Jersey to Pirou	Resolute		
1861	Beachy Head to Dieppe		Glass, Elliot & Company	
1865	South Foreland to Gris Nez		India Rubber, Gutta Percha & Telegraph Works Company	
1866	Lowestoft to Norderney	William Cory		Part of the Indo-European Telegraph Company's line to India
1866	St. Margaret's Bay to La Panne		William Thomas Henley	
1870	Beachy Head to Cape d'Antifer		William Thomas Henley	
1880	Jersey to Pirou			

* Until 1863, all cable cores were made by the Gutta Percha Company as they had a monopoly on gutta-percha cable. In 1863, they merged with cable manufacturer Glass, Elliot & Company to form the Telegraph Construction and Maintenance Company.

== Bibliography ==
- Glover, Bill; Burns, Bill, "The Submarine Telegraph Company", History of the Atlantic Cable & Undersea Communications, accessed and archived 5 August 2020.
- Haigh, Kenneth Richardson, Cableships and Submarine Cables, Adlard Coles, 1968 OCLC 497380538.
- Huurdeman, Anton A., The Worldwide History of Telecommunications, Wiley, 2003 ISBN 0471205052.
- Kieve, Jeffrey L., The Electric Telegraph: A Social and Economic History, David & Charles, 1973 OCLC 655205099.
- Newell, E. L., "Loading coils for ocean cables", Transactions of the American Institute of Electrical Engineers, Part I: Communication and Electronics, vol. 76, iss. 4, pp. 478–482, September 1957.
- Smith, Willoughby, The Rise and Extension of Submarine Telegraphy, J.S. Virtue & Company, 1891 OCLC 1079820592.
