= Gutta Percha Company =

English rubber manufacturer

- Industry: Manufacturing
- Founded: 4 February 1845; 180 years ago in Islington, London
- Founders: Charles Hancock; Henry Bewley
- Defunct: April 1864
- Fate: Merged with Glass, Elliot & Co. to become the Telegraph Construction and Maintenance Company
- Successors: Telegraph Construction and Maintenance Company; British Insulated Callender's Cables
- Headquarters: Islington, London, United Kingdom

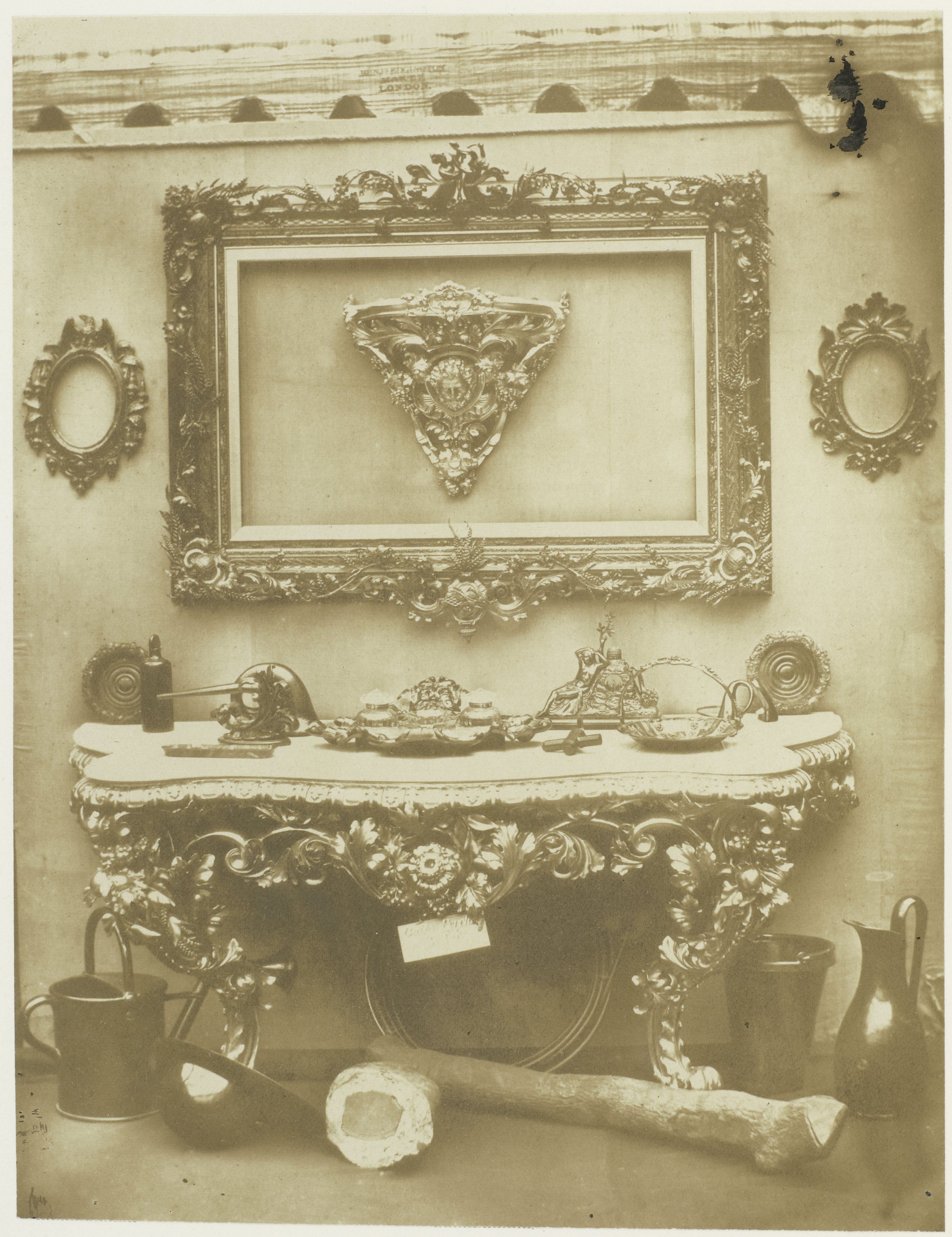
A collection of objects from the Gutta Percha Company at the Great Exhibition of 1851, including a table and picture frames

The Gutta Percha Company was an English company formed in 1845 to make a variety of products from the recently introduced natural rubber gutta-percha. Unlike other natural rubbers, this material was thermoplastic allowing it to be easily moulded. Nothing else like it was available to manufacturing until well into the twentieth century when synthetic plastics were developed.

Gutta-percha proved to be an ideal insulator for submarine telegraph cables. The company started making this type of cable in 1848 and it rapidly became their main product, on which it developed a near-monopoly. The world's first international telegraph connection under the sea, a link from Dover to Calais in 1851, used a cable made by the company. Except for a few early ones, submarine cables were armoured with iron, then later steel, wires. The Gutta Percha Company made only the insulated cores, not the complete cable, until April 1864 when it merged into the Telegraph Construction and Maintenance Company, which was later acquired by British Insulated Callender's Cables in 1959.

== Gutta-percha ==
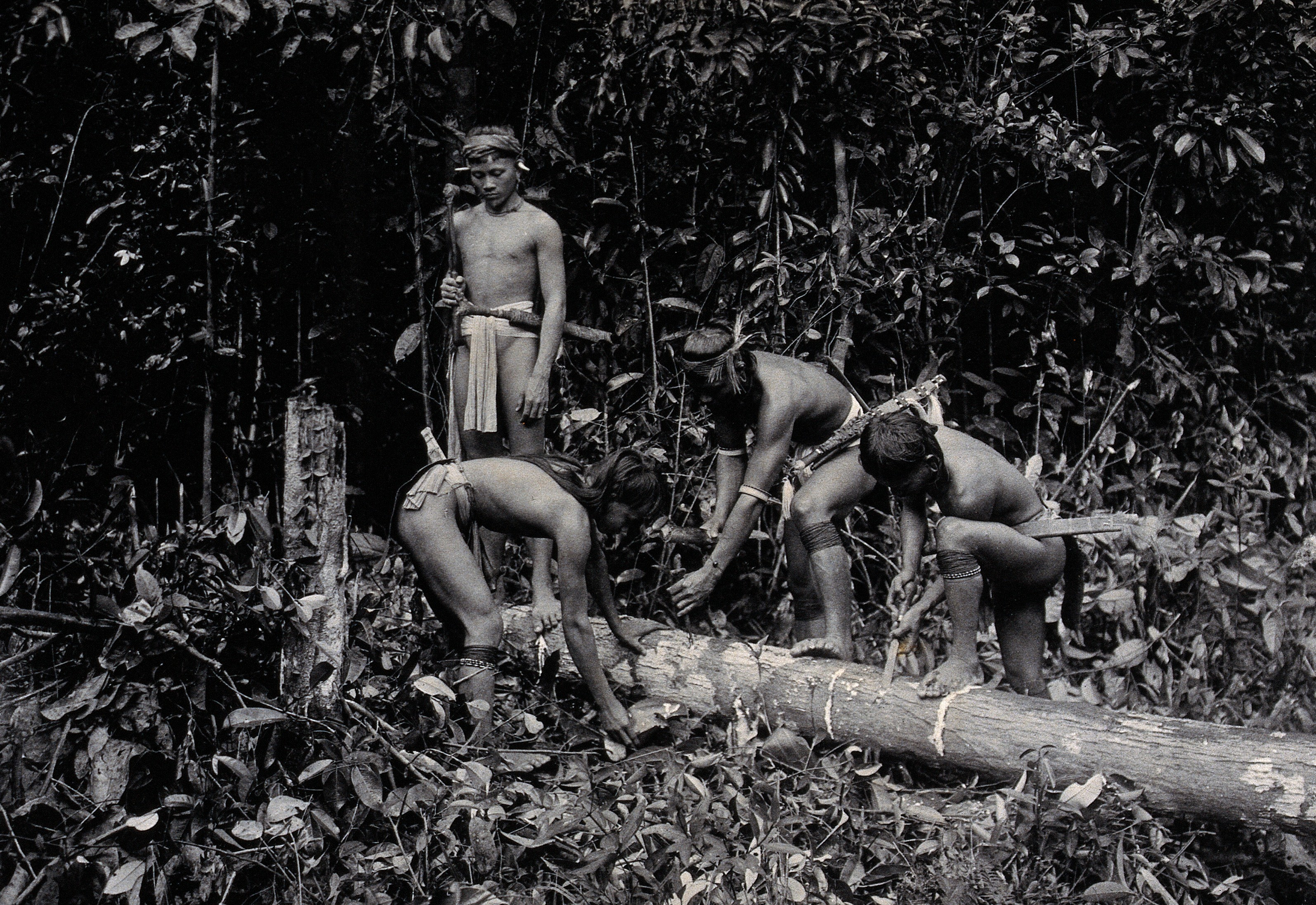
Gutta-percha harvesting on Sarawak

Gutta-percha is a natural rubber that has the unusual property (for 19th-century materials) of being thermoplastic. It can be moulded after placing in hot water and will reharden when cool. It was brought to attention in Europe by William Montgomerie, a Scottish surgeon of the East India Company in Singapore where the trees from which the material is obtained are native. Montgomerie sent samples to the Society of Arts in London in 1843 with the idea that the material could be used for medical apparatus.

In 1844, Montgomerie left samples with Charles Mackintosh's raincoat company. A partner in the company, Thomas Hancock, passed samples to his brother Charles who was trying to invent a new bottle stopper made from cemented ground cork. Hancock then abandoned his original idea and took out a patent for bottle stoppers made from gutta-percha.

== Company history ==
The company was formed on 4 February 1845 by partners Charles Hancock and Henry Bewley, a Dublin chemist making soda water, initially to make Hancock's bottle stoppers. Their premises were at Wharf Road, Islington, London. The range of products was soon greatly expanded, and included machine belts, shoe soles, and toys. However, one of their most important products was gutta-percha insulated electrical cable.

Bewley was also a lead pipe maker. He had designed a machine for extruding lead pipes and on the formation of the Gutta Percha Company, he used this machine for extruding gutta-percha tubing. The company did not at first use this machine for insulating electrical cable. The method initially used was to apply strips of gutta-percha to copper wire. The resulting seam in the insulation was to prove problematic for underwater cables as it provided a route for the ingress of water.

=== Submarine cables ===
Gutta-percha made possible practical submarine telegraph cables because it was both waterproof and resistant to seawater as well as being thermoplastic. Gutta-percha's use as an electrical insulator was first suggested by Michael Faraday after he tested a sample. Many possible insulation schemes for a submarine cable, such as hemp impregnated with tar, were tested by Charles Wheatstone who had suggested a cable between England and France as early as 1840. None of these schemes were successful. Wheatstone had looked at gutta-percha but could not find a good way of applying it to the conductor.

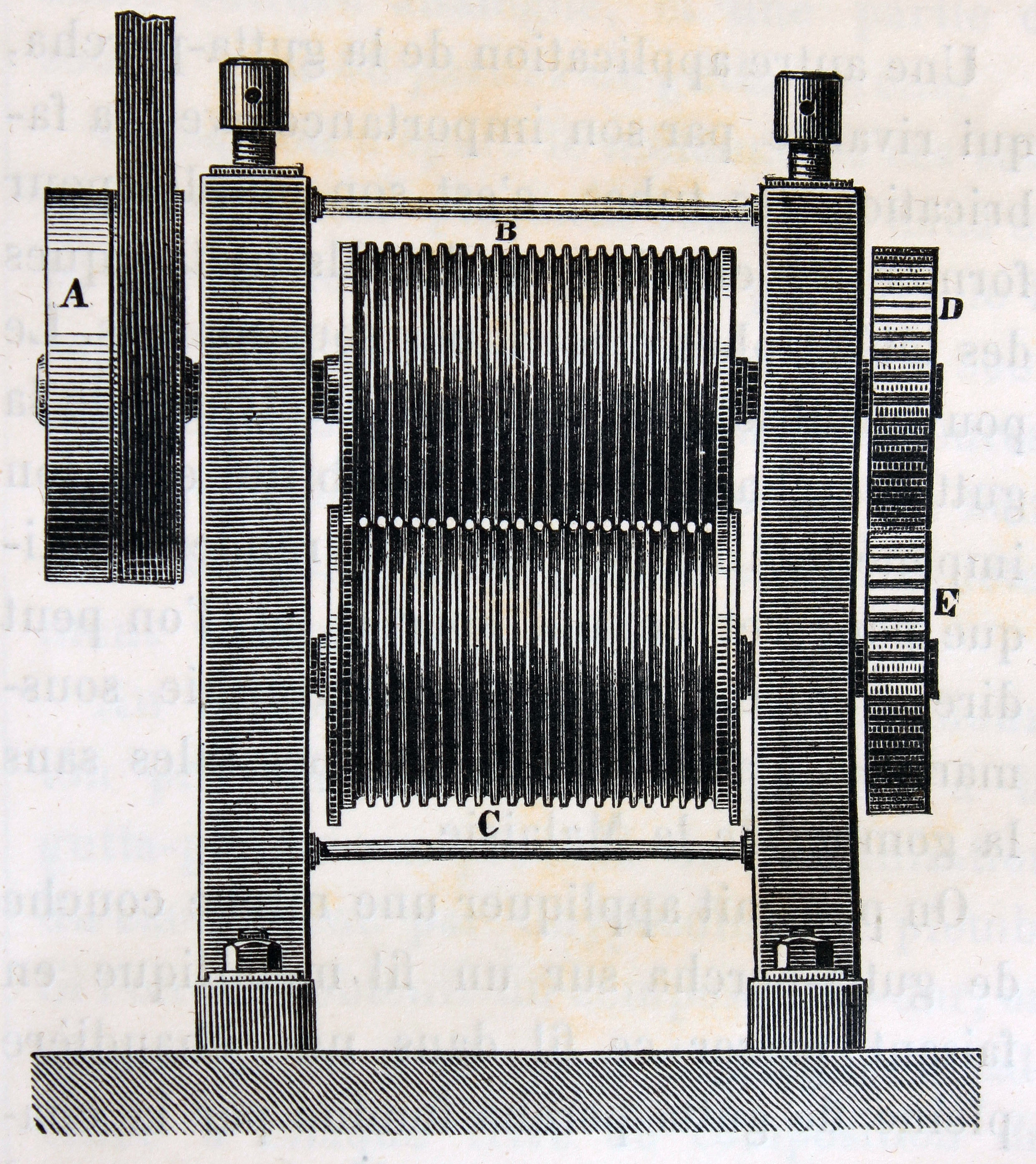
Tube extruding machine, the basis of Hancock's cable core making machine

On hearing of this possible application for gutta-percha, Hancock designed a machine for applying it to a conductor seamlessly. Hancock's machine was an adaptation of Bewley's tube extruding machine. However, Hancock denied Bewley the right to use the machine. The dispute resulted in Hancock leaving and setting up the rival West Ham Gutta Percha Company. Hancock lost the dispute in court and his company went bankrupt. The first order for gutta-percha electrical cable came in 1848 from the South Eastern Railway for a 2-mile (3.2 km) length for experiment. South Eastern Railway, in collaboration with the Submarine Telegraph Company, wished to extend their telegraph line through to France. The cable was successfully tested off Folkestone from the ship Princess Clementine with messages sent through the cable to London. The railway afterwards used the cable in a wet railway tunnel.

This trial was followed in 1849 by an order for 25 nautical miles (46 km) of cable from the Submarine Telegraph Company to lay a cable from Dover to Calais. This cable, laid in 1850, soon failed, largely because the Submarine Telegraph Company failed to have it armoured. Undeterred, the company placed a new order in 1850, but this time the cable was to be sent to a wire rope manufacturer for armouring before laying. This order was four times as large as the 1849 order since the new cable was to have four gutta-percha insulated cores. This cable was a success, and became the first working oceanic submarine cable.

Although the Gutta Percha Company were the first to make a cable for crossing an ocean, they were not the first to make a gutta-percha insulated underwater cable. Faraday published his suggestion in 1848, but had previously privately recommended gutta-percha to William Siemens of Siemens Brothers who passed the information to his brother Werner von Siemens. In 1847 Werner invented a machine, described as like a macaroni machine, for applying gutta-percha to a conductor seamlessly. His company, Siemens & Halske, then laid underground gutta-percha cables extensively around Germany, including one that crossed the Rhine in 1849. However, the Gutta Percha Company were the first to make a cable that crossed an ocean. The Gutta Percha Company does not appear to have had any intellectual property issues with Siemens. This was because Siemens' work was largely for military purposes and consequently nothing was patented initially. Siemens even obtained the gutta-percha from the Gutta Percha Company. The cables were not just for military communications, one 1848 cable in Kiel harbour had the overtly military purpose of setting off mines.

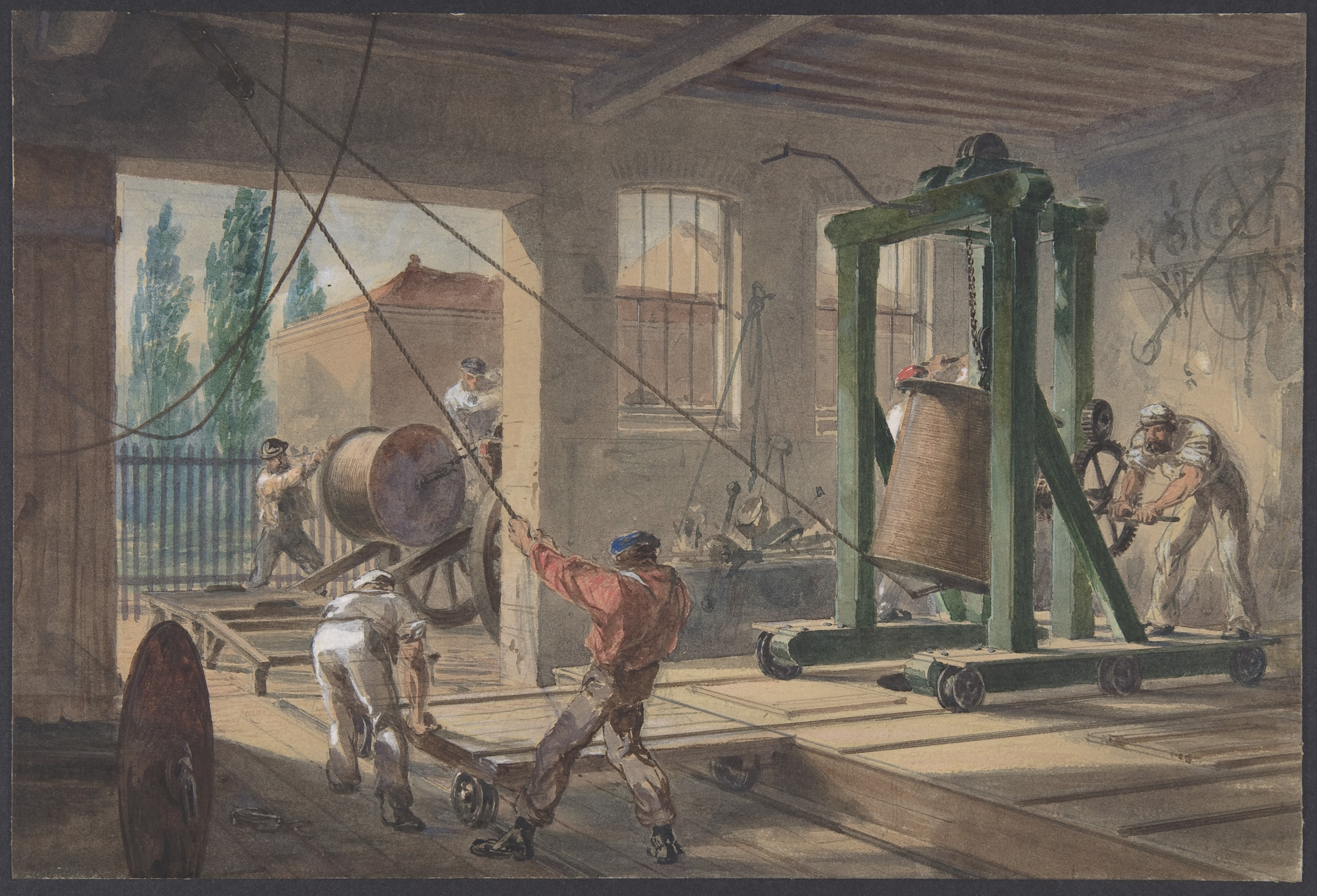
Reels of gutta-percha insulated cable being loaded at the Greenwich works shortly after the merger into the Telegraph Construction and Maintenance Company

Gutta-percha insulated core rapidly became the chief product of the company. In 1851–1852 they produced 1,300 nautical miles (2,400 km) of it. The company had a monopoly on this product, and the cores for nearly all submarine cables made before 1865 were made by them. The Gutta Percha Company never made finished cables; they supplied the cores and other companies, mostly wire rope manufacturers, laid them into the steel armouring to make complete cables. In April 1864, the Gutta Percha Company merged with Glass, Elliot and Company, one of these wire rope makers, to form the Telegraph Construction and Maintenance Company who could supply completed cables and provide maintenance for them. The merger was at the instigation of John Pender who became chairman of the company. Pender's motivation in this was that the new company should make the first successful transatlantic telegraph cable for the Atlantic Telegraph Company.

== Gutta-percha quality ==
The quality of gutta-percha, as supplied by the Gutta Percha Company, was extensively discussed by Charles Bright in his book Submarine Telegraphs. Bright's father, Charles Tilston Bright, was the chief electrician (chief engineer) of the Magnetic Telegraph Company, a major customer of the Gutta Percha Company, and later electrician-in-chief of the first transatlantic telegraph cable project of the Atlantic Telegraph Company, also using the Gutta Percha Company's product.

Gutta-percha from different regions contains different amounts of resin, resulting in variations in quality. For electrical cables, the resin content needs to be minimal. The best gutta-percha came from Java and Makassar, the worst came from Borneo. The factory purification process could also make a difference. A good commercial gutta-percha would have around 80% gutta and 15% or less of resin. Water content has no appreciable effect on the electrical resistance of the material until the content reaches a threshold of around 2–3%.

Highly purified gutta-percha is almost entirely resistant to chemical attack and ingress of water. However, obtaining this level of purity was not economical for submarine cables. Impure gutta-percha oxidises and becomes brittle. The rate of deterioration is very slow for cable permanently in the water, but cable crossing the landing zone is exposed to frequent changes in temperature and cycles of exposure and submerging. This environment could cause the insulation to crumble and expose the conductor. For this reason, these sections of cable were protected with an additional layer of another material such as India rubber.

Additives to the gutta-percha could greatly affect quality. The material supplied for the Siemens cables by the Gutta Percha Company had a high sulphur content. This, together with poor joints and poor manufacturing by Siemens, caused many of the early Siemens cables to quickly fail.

== See also ==
- Willoughby Smith

== Bibliography ==
- Ash, Stewart, "The development of submarine cables", ch. 1 in, Burnett, Douglas R. (ed); Beckman, Robert (ed); Davenport, Tara M. (ed), Submarine Cables: The Handbook of Law and Policy, Martinus Nijhoff Publishers, 2013 ISBN 9004260331.
- Bright, Charles, Submarine Telegraphs, London: Crosby Lockwood, 1898 OCLC 776529627.
- Buckley, Charles Burton, An Anecdotal History of Old Times in Singapore, vol. 1, Singapore: Fraser & Neave, 1902 OCLC 220728943.
- Fari, Simone, Victorian Telegraphy Before Nationalization, Springer, 2015 ISBN 1137406526.
- Haigh, Kenneth Richardson, Cableships and Submarine Cables, Adlard Coles, 1968 OCLC 497380538.
- Hearn, Chester G., Circuits in the Sea: The Men, the Ships, and the Atlantic Cable, Greenwood Publishing Group, 2004 ISBN 0275982319.
- Huurdeman, Anton A., The Worldwide History of Telecommunications, Wiley, 2003 ISBN 0471205052.
- Scott, Jesup W., "1851: Precipice in time", introduction in, Wilson, Ben (ed), Heyday: Britain and the Birth of the Modern World, Hachette UK, 2016 ISBN 0297864114.
