= Central Department Store (disambiguation) =

Central Department Store may refer to:

- Central Department Store in Thailand and Indonesia
- Central Department Store (Rostov-on-Don)
- Central Department Store (Sofia)
- TsUM, Tsentralny Universalny Magazin', lit. Central Department Store, Russia
