= Pustovoitov =

Pustovoitov or Pustovoytov (Russian: Пустовойтов; feminine: Pustovoitova) is a Russian-language surname. Notable people with the surname include:

- Anastasia Pustovoitova (born 1981), Russian footballer
- Daria Pustovoitova (born 1994), Russian chess player
- Fyodor Pustovoytov (1912–1989), Russian Soviet painter
- Grigory Pustovoytov, Russian merchant and ship owner, the namesake of the Trading House of G.G. Pustovoytov
