= Trading house of Yablokovy =

Building in Russia

Coordinates: 47°13′15.53″N 39°42′45.79″E

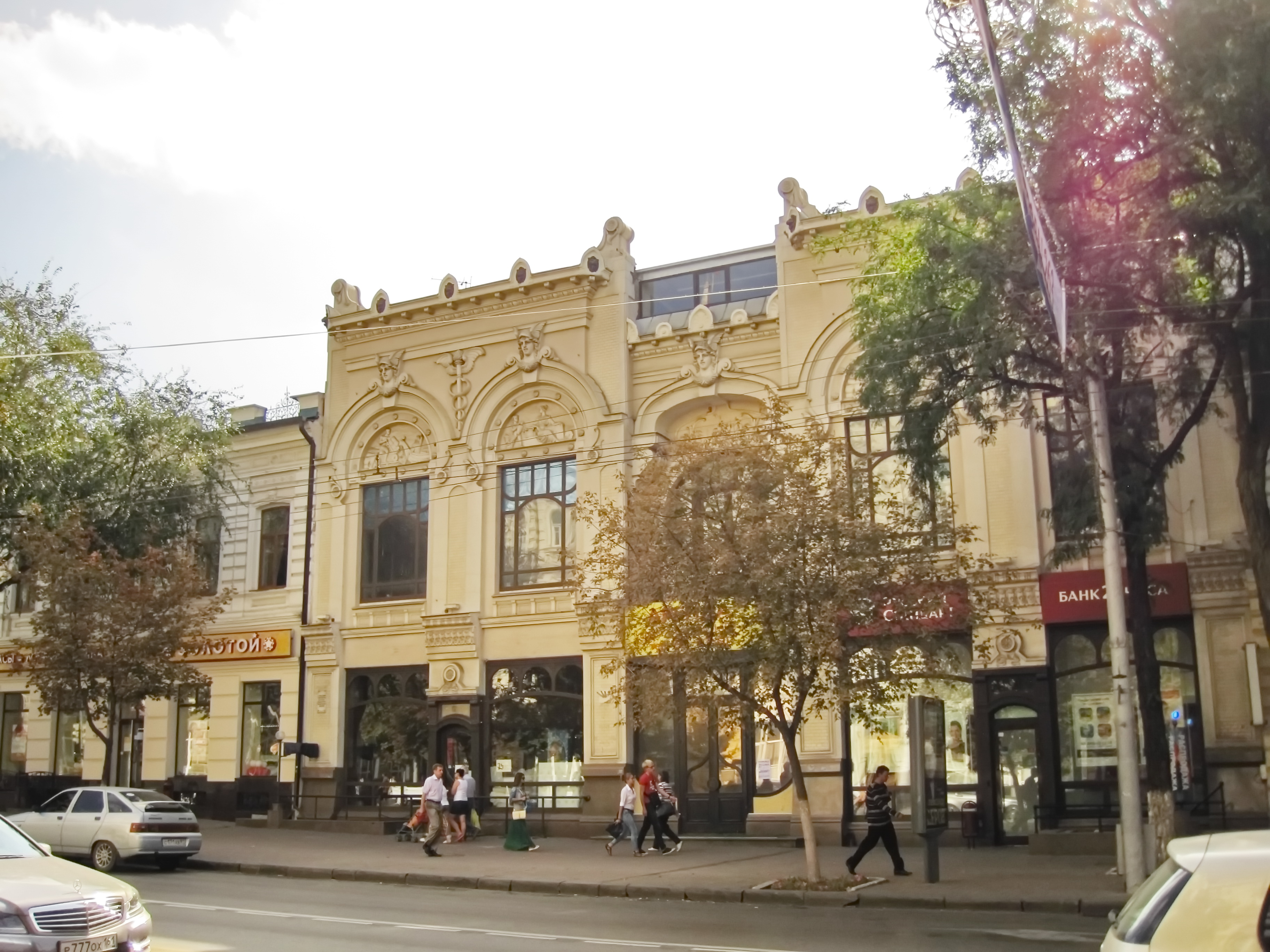
Shown in 2012.

Trading house of Yablokovy (Russian: Торговый дом Яблоковых) is a building located at 64 Bolshaya Sadovaya Street in Rostov-on-Don. It was built in 1898 upon the project of architect E.M. Gulin and is considered as a cultural heritage site.

== History ==
The house belonged to S.K. Yablokov. The first was taken on lease by commercial companies while basement of the building was meant for the cellar Fortuna where different cabaret shows and theatrical performances often took place. The second floor of the trading house was occupied by R. Shtremer in 1904 - it was the place where one of the first Southern Russia's electrobiographers (a former name of cinemas) opened.

The cinema Olimp got the status of an electrobiographer in 1917. In 1924 the trading house was nationalized. Then Voentorg and Rospromtorg shops were housed on the first floor. In 1930s the cinema was renamed into Komsomolets and lingered on by 1990s, interrupting its work only in wartime.

== Architecture ==
The two-storey building is located at Bolshaya Sadovaya Street (or Big Garden Street) between the Kostanayev House and hotel Moskovskaya. The architecture and design of the building is abundant with details of such architectural styles as Eclecticism and Modernism. Its distinguishing feature is large windows. The first floor is intended for shops. Windows of the second floor are richly decorated. There is Hermes's head on each keystone. Pillars are decorated with stucco work of caduceus. The central window on the second floor is designed as a loggia with a small balcony.
