= Willoughby Smith =

English electrical engineer

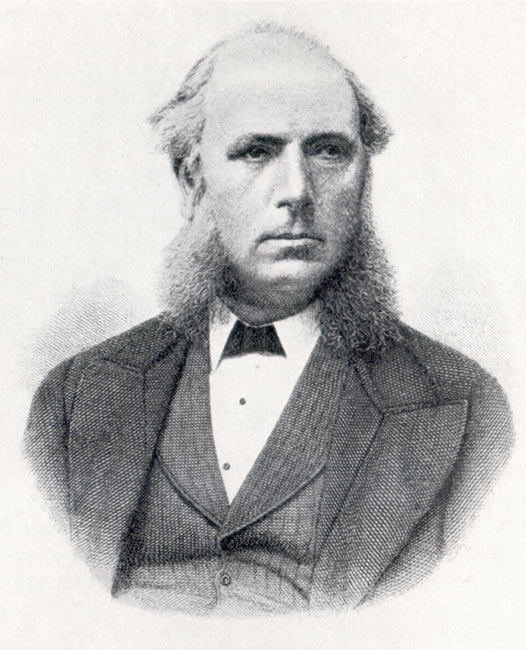
- Born: 6 April 1828; Great Yarmouth, Norfolk, England
- Died: 17 July 1891 (aged 63); Eastbourne, Sussex, England
- Resting place: Highgate Cemetery, London
- Known for: Photoelectric cells, Photoresistor
- Children: 6
- Parents: William Smith (father); Harriot Smith (mother)
- Awards: Emmy Award

Willoughby Smith (6 April 1828 – 17 July 1891) was an English electrical engineer who discovered the photoconductivity of the element selenium. This discovery led to the invention of photoelectric cells, including those used in the earliest television systems.

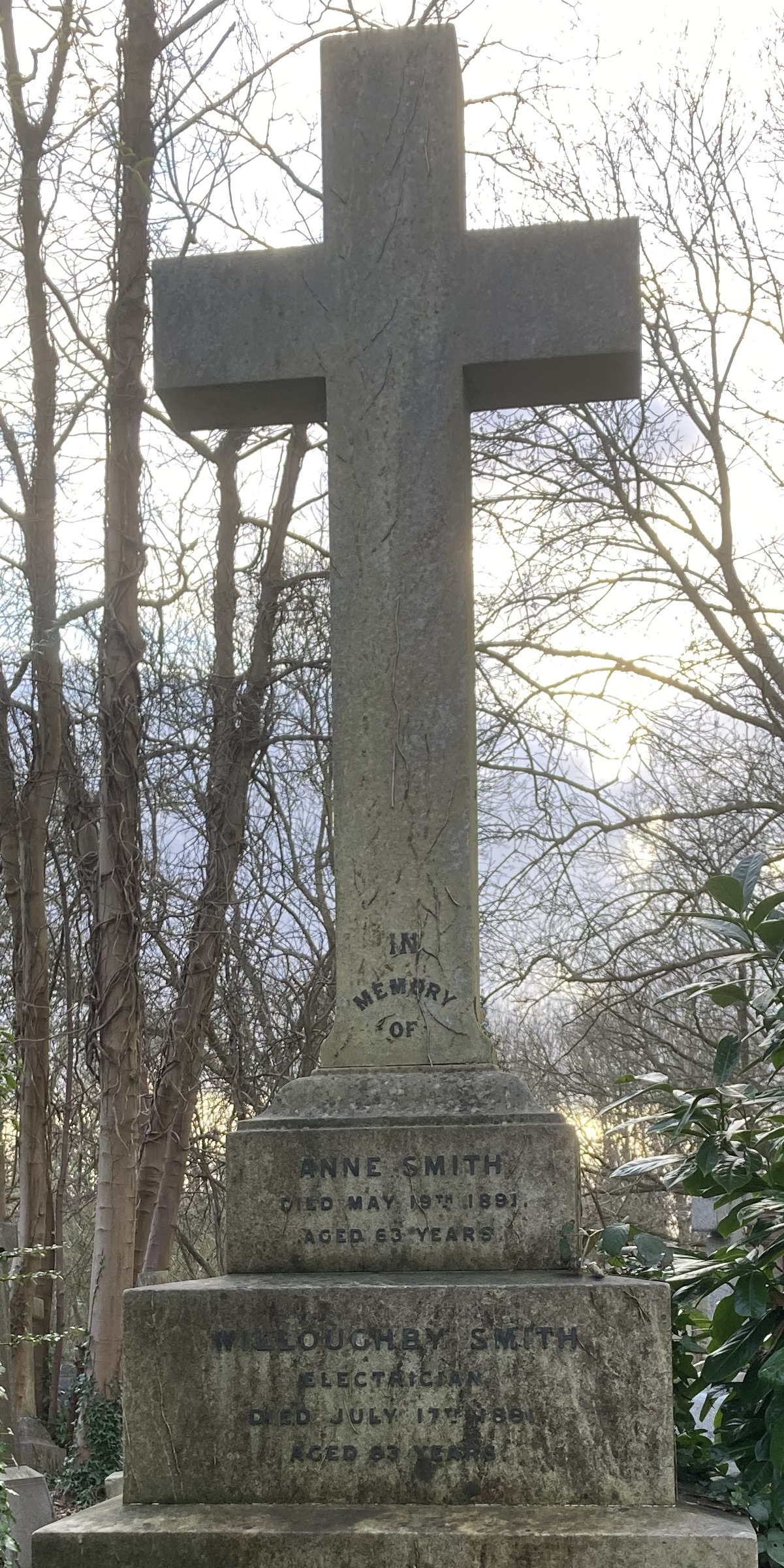
Grave of Willoughby Smith in Highgate Cemetery

== Career ==
In 1848, he began working for the Gutta Percha Company, London where he developed iron and copper wires insulated with gutta-percha to be used for telegraph wires. In 1850, Smith superintended the manufacture and laying of 30 miles of underwater telegraph wire from Dover to Calais. Though the first cable failed almost immediately, another laid the following year was a success and over the following decades, Smith and the company he worked for were involved with many other underwater telegraph cable projects.

In 1866, Smith developed a method for continually testing an underwater cable as it was being laid. For his test circuit, he needed a semi-conducting material with a high resistance and selected selenium rods for this purpose. The selenium seemed to do the job properly, except in actual use, the device gave inconsistent results. Upon investigation, it was discovered that the conductivity of the selenium rods increased significantly when exposed to strong light. Smith described his research in a paper presented at the 12 February 1873 meeting of the Society of Telegraph Engineers as "Electrical Properties of Selenium and the Effect of Light Thereon". A brief summary was published as the "Effect of Light on Selenium during the passage of an Electric Current" in the 20 February 1873 issue of Nature. In 2017 his work on selenium was recognized with a Technology and Engineering Emmy Award for "Concept of Opto-Electric Transduction" by the National Academy of Television Arts and Sciences. As the Emmy can be presented only to living persons, the award was made to three organizations (or their successors) with which his work was associated: Telcon (now Alcatel-Lucent), the Society of Telegraph Engineers (now the Institution of Engineering and Technology, IET) and Siemens.

== Personal life ==
Willoughby was the son of William Smith, a sailor, and his wife, Harriot. He married Ann, daughter of William Sanders, a brewer, at St John's, Waterloo, on 24 June 1849. By 1871 they had three daughters and three sons.

Smith died on 17 July 1891 and is buried with his wife Ann on the east side of Highgate Cemetery.

== Works ==
- Book: Selenium, its electrical qualities, and the effect of light thereon : being a paper read before the Society of Telegraph Engineers. 28 November 1877, Willoughby Smith
- Book: A résumé of the earlier days of electric telegraphy. Hayman Brothers and Lilly, Printers, 1881, Willoughby Smith
- Book: The rise and extension of submarine telegraphy. London: J.S. Virtue & co, 1891, Willoughby Smith
- Book: Selenium: its electrical qualities, and the effect of light thereon. London, 1877, Willoughby Smith
