= Central Department Store (Rostov-on-Don) =

Shopping complex on Bolshaya Sadovaya street

Coordinates: 47°13′10″N 39°42′29″E

- Центральный универмаг (Ростов-на-Дону) (Russian)
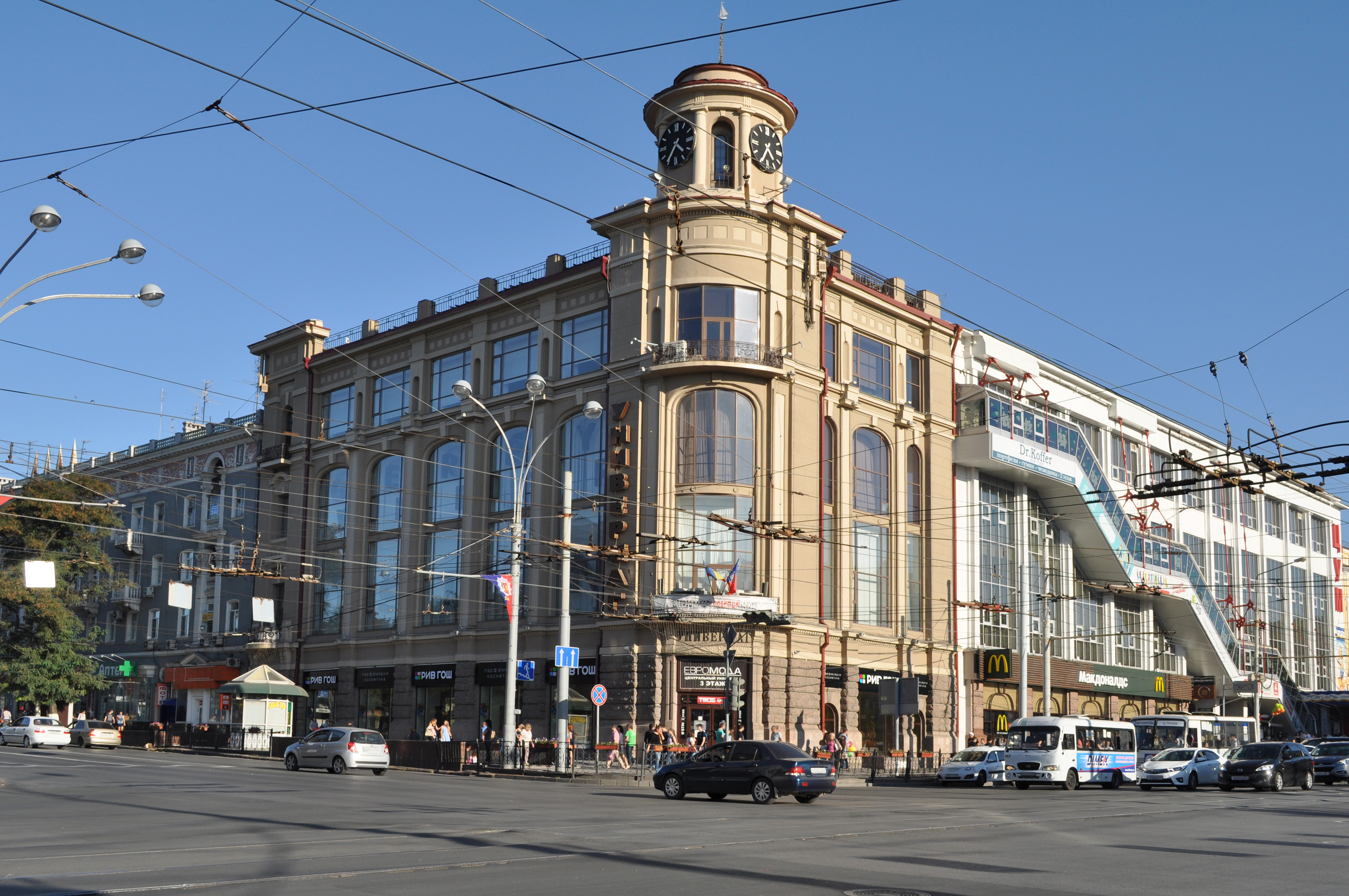
- The Central Department Store in 2015
- Interactive map of Central Department Store (Rostov-on-Don)
- Location: Rostov-on-Don Russia

History
- Built: 1910

Site notes
- Area: more than 4000 square meters
- Architect: Yevgeny Gulin

The central department store (Russian: Центральный универмаг) is a shopping complex on Bolshaya Sadovaya Street, house 46/30, in Rostov-on-Don. It is located in the historic G. G. Pustovoytov House, and has the status of an object of cultural heritage of Russia of regional significance.^{[a]}

== History ==
The G. G. Pustovoytov House was built in 1910, at the expense of the shipowner and city patron G. G. Pustovoytov. It was built to the design of architect Yevgeny Gulin, and is located in the historical part of the city at the intersection of Bolshaya Sadovaya Street and Budennovsky Prospekt.

The building initially housed the "London" and "Central" hotels, and A. Girshtein's jewelry and watch shop. In the old part of the department store there was a branch of the Riga-headquartered company "Provodnik". In Soviet times, the library of the North Caucasian University was located in the building. The building was destroyed in the 1940s, and was rebuilt in 1949 according to the design of architects P. Kalashnikov and G. A. Petrov. In 1965 an additional wing was built, designed by the architect Likhobabin. In the 21st century, the Rostov central department store is located in the premises of Pustovoytov's former trading house. Its total area is more than 4000 square meters. When the department store was reconstructed, the area was enlarged due to the reduction of storage facilities, and the opening of additional premises.

== Description ==
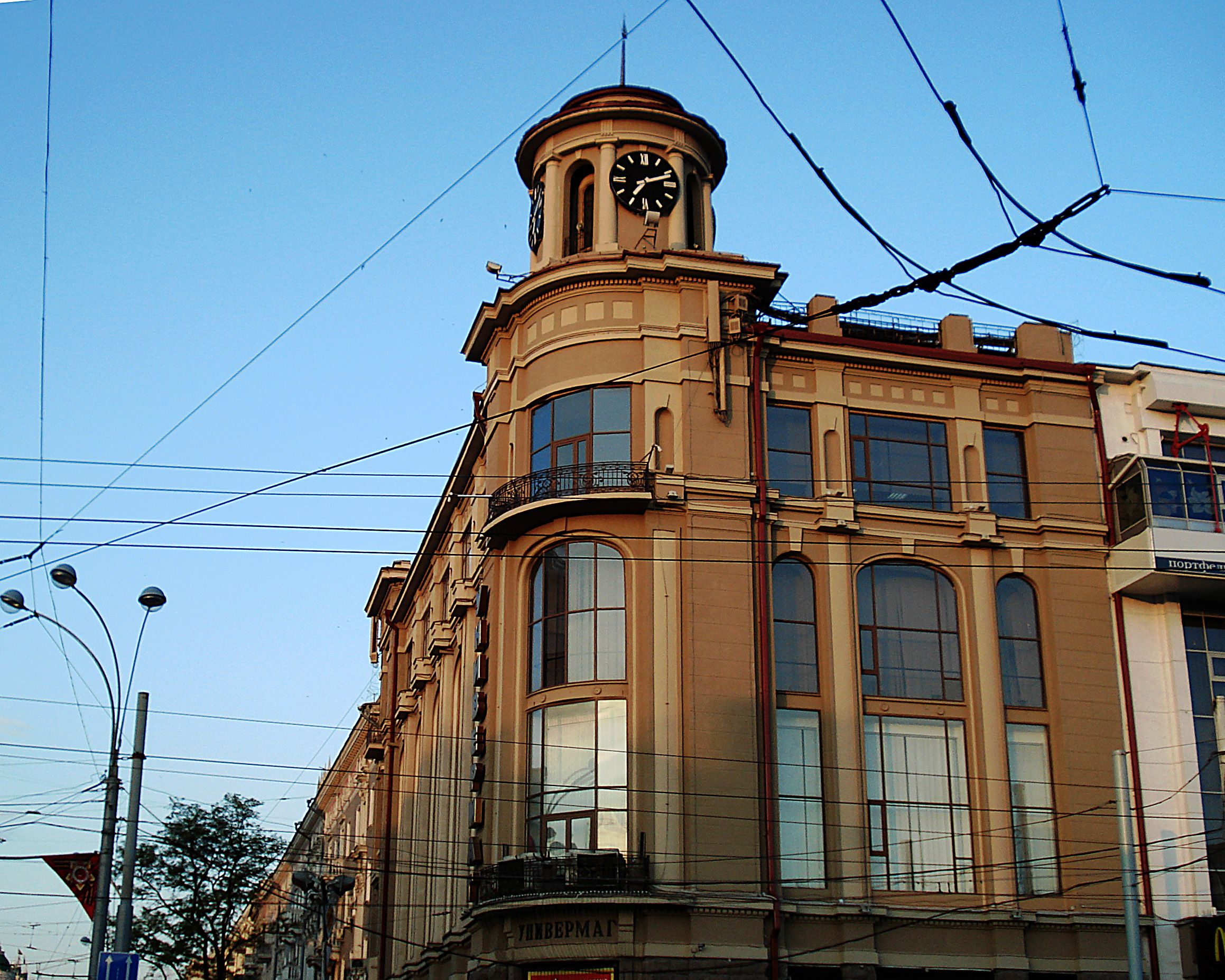
The Art Nouveau windows and clocktower

The building is in the Art Nouveau style with characteristic window elements. The house has a ground, first, second, third and fourth floors. At the time of construction it was one of the largest buildings in the city.

== Notes ==
a. The building was inscribed on the list of cultural heritage objects by resolution of the head of administration of the Rostov region №. 411 from 10/9/1998, recorded in the edition of the Resolution of the Rostov Region Administration on 27 November 2014 No. 495.
