= Glass, Elliot & Co =

Business formed by the partnership

Glass, Elliot & Co was a business formed by the partnership of the mining engineer George Elliot with Richard Atwood Glass in 1854. When William Kuper and Co. went bankrupt in 1849 they were manufacturing wire rope in premises on the Surrey Canal. Their manager, George Elliot, relocated the firm to Morden Wharf gaining a sub lease from Charles Holcombe. By 1854 Elliott had paid off both creditors and family investors in the Kuper company and established his new business with Richard Glass.

At the instigation of John Pender the company was merged with the Gutta Percha Company in 1864 to form the Telegraph Construction and Maintenance Company (Telcon). John Pender was the first chairperson.
