= Trading House of G.G. Pustovoytov =

Trading house of G.G. Pustovoytov
- Торговый дом Г. Г. Пустовойтова (Russian)
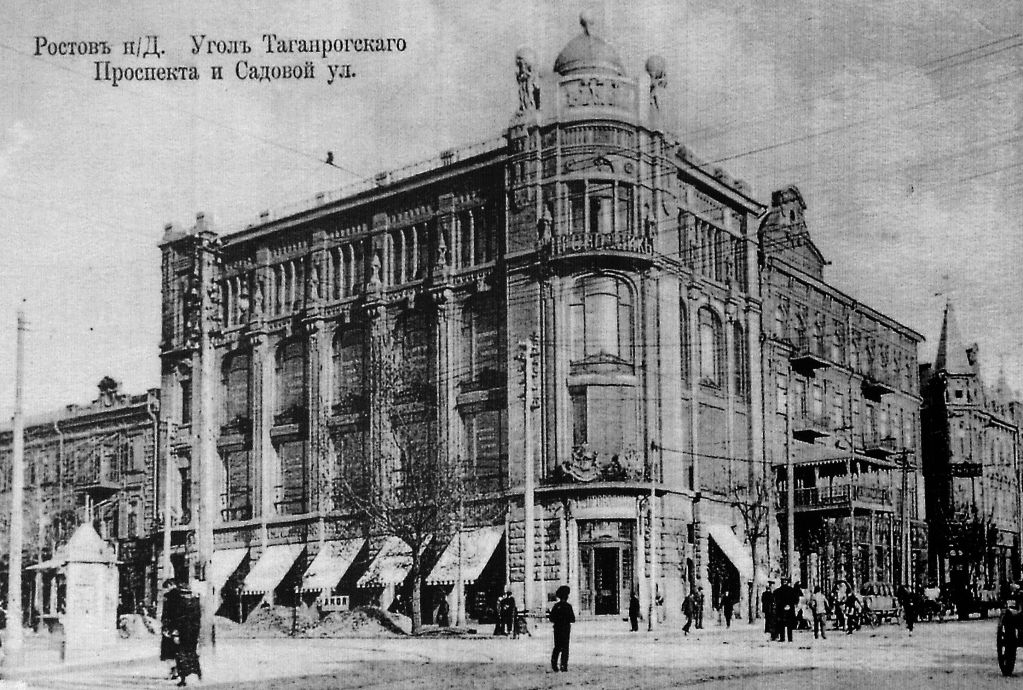

- Location within Russia
- 47°13′12″N 39°42′29″E
- Location: Rostov-on-Don Russia

History
- Built: 1910

Site notes
- Architect: E.M. Gulin
- Architectural style: department store style
- Owner: G.G. Pustovoytov

Trading house of G.G. Pustovoytov (Russian: Торговый дом Г. Г. Пустовойтова ) is a building in Rostov-on-Don at the intersection of Bolshaya Sadovaya and Budennovskiy avenue (address: 46, Bolshaya Sadovaya).

The house was built in 1910 by a major patron and ship owner Grigory Gavrilovich Pustovoytov, the architect of the project was E.M. Gulin. The profitable house of G.G. Pustovoytov is an object of cultural heritage of regional significance.

== History ==
At the beginning of the 20th century, G.G. Pustovoytov's trading house was considered as one of the highest buildings in the city. As in most profitable houses of that time, the rooms of the house of G.G. Pustovoytov were rented out. After the completion of the building, the Rostov branch of the Association of Russian-French rubber, gutta-percha and telegraph production plants was located in the building under the company "Provodnik". Also there was the jewelry and watch store of A. Girshtein, the "Central" and "London" hotels.

== Building Trade House after the bombing ==
In 1920, the building was nationalized, it housed the Southeast State Woolen Association.

In 1930, the 4th floor of the building was occupied by the scientific library of the RSU named after V.M. Molotov and the board of the university. The collection of the scientific library was made up of Russian magazines of the late 18th and early 19th centuries, among them one of the first Russian satirical magazines ”The Painter” (satirical magazine), “Moscow Journal”, one of the first Russian literary and political magazines “Vestnik of Europe”(1802–1830) ), "Moscow Telegraph", the magazine "Contemporary", founded by A. S. Pushkin.

In 1942, during the second occupation of Rostov-on-Don by German fascist troops, the city was exposed to bombing. One of the bombs hit the house of G.G. Pustovoytov which destroyed the roof of the building and the rotunda. As a result of the bombing the upper floors of G.G. Pustovoytov's house were completely burnt down, the fire destroyed all book fund of scientific library.

In 1965 the building was reconstructed. According to the project of the architect E.P. Likhobabin, the building was completed with a southern wing along Budennovskiy Avenue. Before the Great Patriotic War, in place of the new wing was another house of Grigory Pustovoytov and Karapet Chernov which could not be restored after the bombing of 1942.

== Architecture ==
The project of G.G. Pustovoytov's house was occupied by the architect of Rostov-Nakhichevan city governorate E. M. Gulin who has finished at that time construction of trading house of merchants Yablokov.

The main role in the architecture of G.G. Pustovoytov's house is played by the principles of one of the formal trends of rational modernity - the "department store style" or the "industrial-commercial style" which arose in 1897 in Germany. During the construction of the building, a new frame-walled structural system was use, which is displayed in the plasticity of the facades united in a single rhythmic composition with the predominance of vertical divisions. In the architectural community the trading house of G.G. Pustovoytov is often compared with the Kuznetsovs' trading house in Moscow and the Mertens trading house in St. Petersburg, which gives reason to speak not only of the strong influence of the capital examples, but also of creative loan. The architecture of the end of the XIX beginning of the 20th century was a criterion of Rostov "capital character" and variety.

== Gallery ==
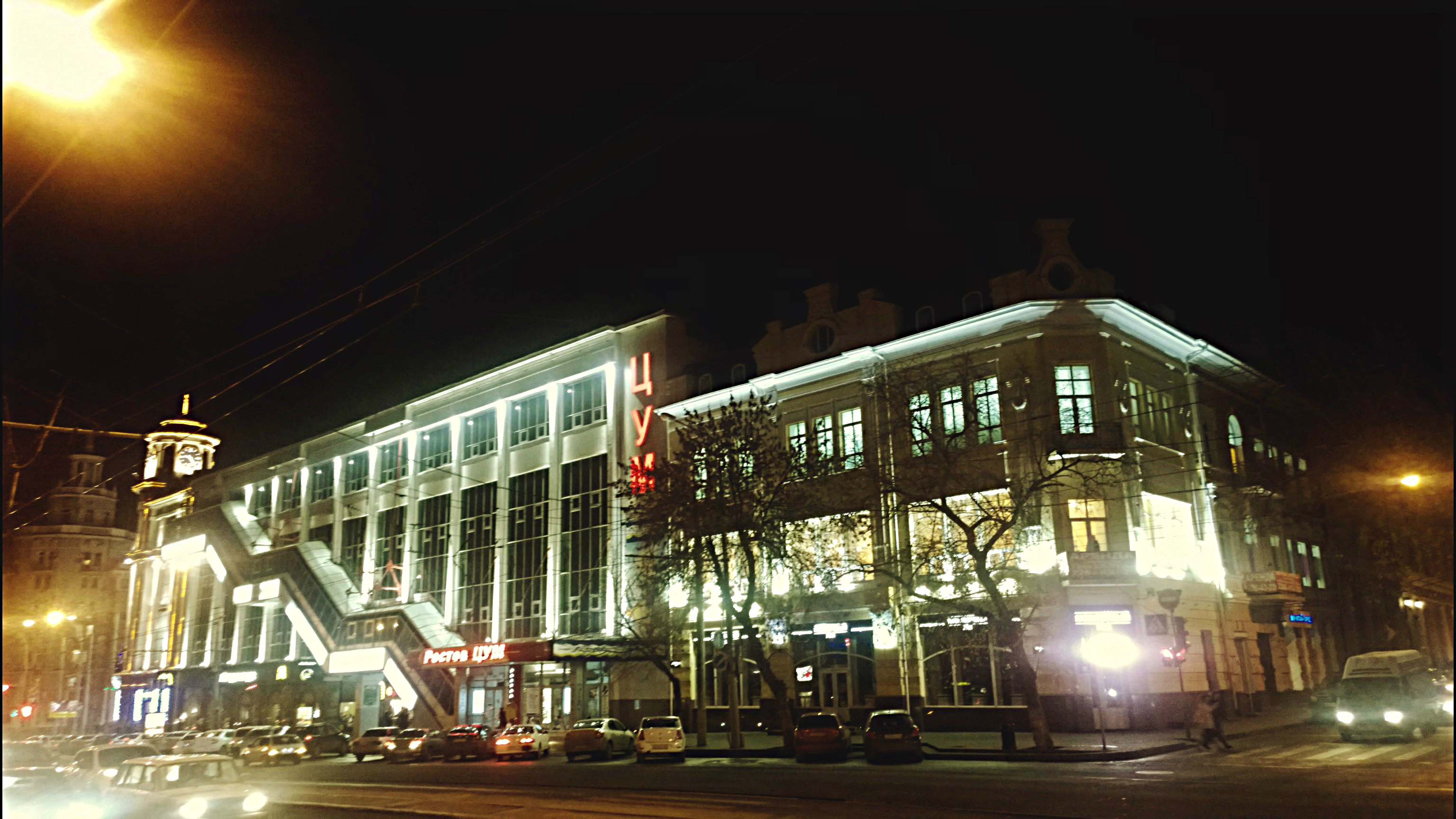
View on the south wing of the trading house of G.G. Pustovoytov

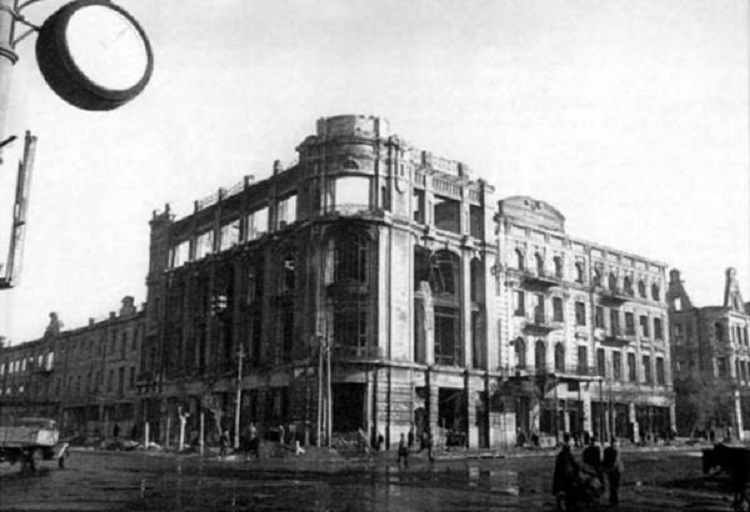
A building after bombing

== Literature ==
- Есаулов Г. В., Черницына В. А. Архитектурная летопись Ростова-на-Дону. — 2-е изд.. — Ростов-на-Дону, 2002. — ISBN 5-8456-0489-3.
- Л. И. Усачёва, «Ростов-на-Дону в прошлом и настоящем», с. 40.
- Газета «Ростов официальный», статья «Бой часов над воротами города» No. 2 (476) от 14 января 2004 год.
- Газета «Ростов официальный», статья «Часы большого города» No. 50 (681) от 19 декабря 2007 года.
