= Armoured cable =

Electric power cable protected by a layer of steel wires

In electrical power distribution, armoured cable usually means steel wire armoured cable (SWA) which is a hard-wearing power cable designed for the supply of mains electricity. It is one of a number of armoured electrical cables – which include 11 kV Cable and 33 kV Cable – and is found in underground systems, power networks and cable ducting.

Aluminium can also be used for armouring, and historically iron was used. Armouring is also applied to submarine communications cables.

== Construction ==
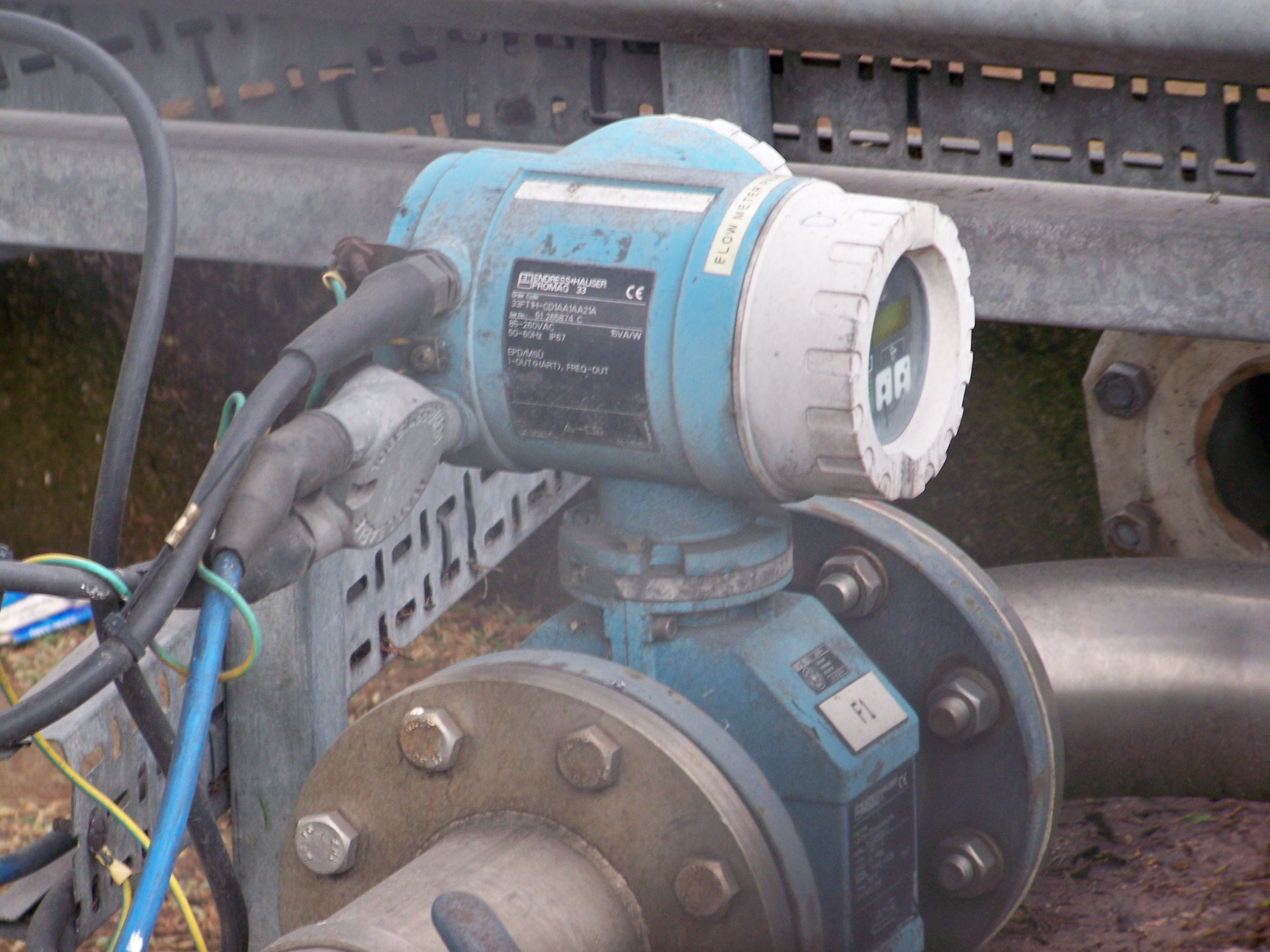
Example of steel wire armoured cables in a UK installation. Blue sheathed cable is normally instrumentation signal, black is power

The typical construction of an SWA cable can be broken down as follows:

- Conductor: consists of plain stranded copper (cables are classified to indicate the degree of flexibility. Class 2 refers to rigid stranded copper conductors as stipulated by British Standard BS EN 60228:2005)
- Insulation: Cross-linked polyethylene (XLPE) is used in a number of power cables because it has good water resistance and excellent electrical properties. Insulation in cables ensures that conductors and other metal substances do not come into contact with each other.
- Bedding: Polyvinyl chloride (PVC) bedding is used to provide a protective boundary between inner and outer layers of the cable.
- Armour: Steel wire armour provides mechanical protection, which means the cable can withstand higher stresses, be buried directly and used in external or underground projects. The armouring is normally connected to earth and can sometimes be used as the circuit protective conductor ("earth wire") for the equipment supplied by cable.
- Sheath: a black PVC sheath holds all components of the cable together and provides additional protection from external stresses.

The PVC version of SWA cable, described above, meets the requirements of both British Standard BS 5467 and International Electrotechnical Commission standard IEC 60502. It is known as SWA BS 5467 Cable and it has a voltage rating of 600/1000 V.

SWA cable can be referred to more generally as mains cable, armoured cable, power cable and booklet armoured cable. The name power cable, however, applies to a wide range of cables including 6381Y, NYCY, NYY-J and 6491X Cable.

== Aluminium wire armoured cable ==
Steel wire armour is only used on multicore versions of the cable. A multicore cable, as the name suggests, is one where there are a number of different cores. When cable has only one core, aluminium wire armour (AWA) is used instead of steel wire. This is because the aluminium is non-magnetic. A magnetic field is produced by the current in a single core cable. This would induce an electric current in the steel wire, which could cause overheating.

== Use of armour for earthing ==
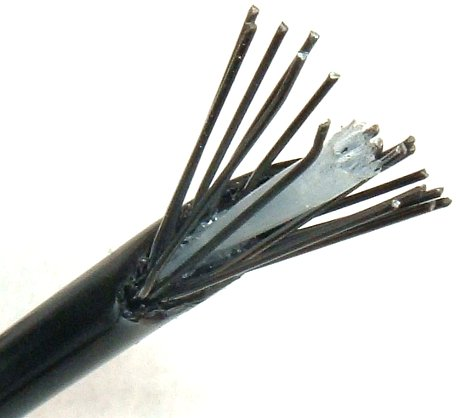
cable with light armouring

The use of the armour as the means of providing earthing to the equipment supplied by the cable (a function technically known as the circuit protective conductor or CPC) is a matter of debate within the electrical installation industry. It is sometimes the case that an additional core within the cable is specified as the CPC (for instance, instead of using a two core cable for line and neutral and the armouring as the CPC, a three core cable is used) or an external earth wire is run alongside the cable to serve as the CPC. Primary concerns are the relative conductivity of the armouring compared to the cores (which reduces as the cable size increases) and reliability issues. Recent articles by authoritative sources have analysed the practice in detail and concluded that, for the majority of situations, the armouring is adequate to serve as the CPC under UK wiring regulations.

== SWA BS 6724 cable ==
The construction of an SWA cable depends on the intended use. When the power cable needs to be installed in a public area, for example, a Low Smoke Zero Halogen (LSZH) equivalent, called SWA BS 6724 Cable must be used. After the King’s Cross fire in London in 1987 it became mandatory to use LSZH sheathing on all London Underground cables – a number of the fatalities were due to toxic gas and smoke inhalation. As a result, LSZH cables are now recommended for use in highly populated enclosed public areas. This is because they emit non-toxic levels of Halogen and low levels of smoke when exposed to fire. SWA Cable BS 6724 – which meets the requirements of British standard BS 6724 – has LSZH bedding and a black LSZH sheath.

== Use in telecommunications ==
Armoured cable is used for submarine communications cable to protect against damage by fishing vessels and wildlife. Early cables carrying telegraph used iron wire armouring, but later switched to steel. The first of these was a cable across the English Channel laid by the Submarine Telegraph Company in 1851. Many more telegraph, and later, telephone cables soon followed with multiple cores. Modern cables are fibre-optic cables rather than copper cores. The first transatlantic fibre-optic cable was TAT-8 in 1988.

== See also ==
- Electrical cable
- Electrical wiring
