= Kostanayev House =

Building in Rostov-on-Don, Russia

Coordinates: 47°13′15.8″N 39°42′47″E

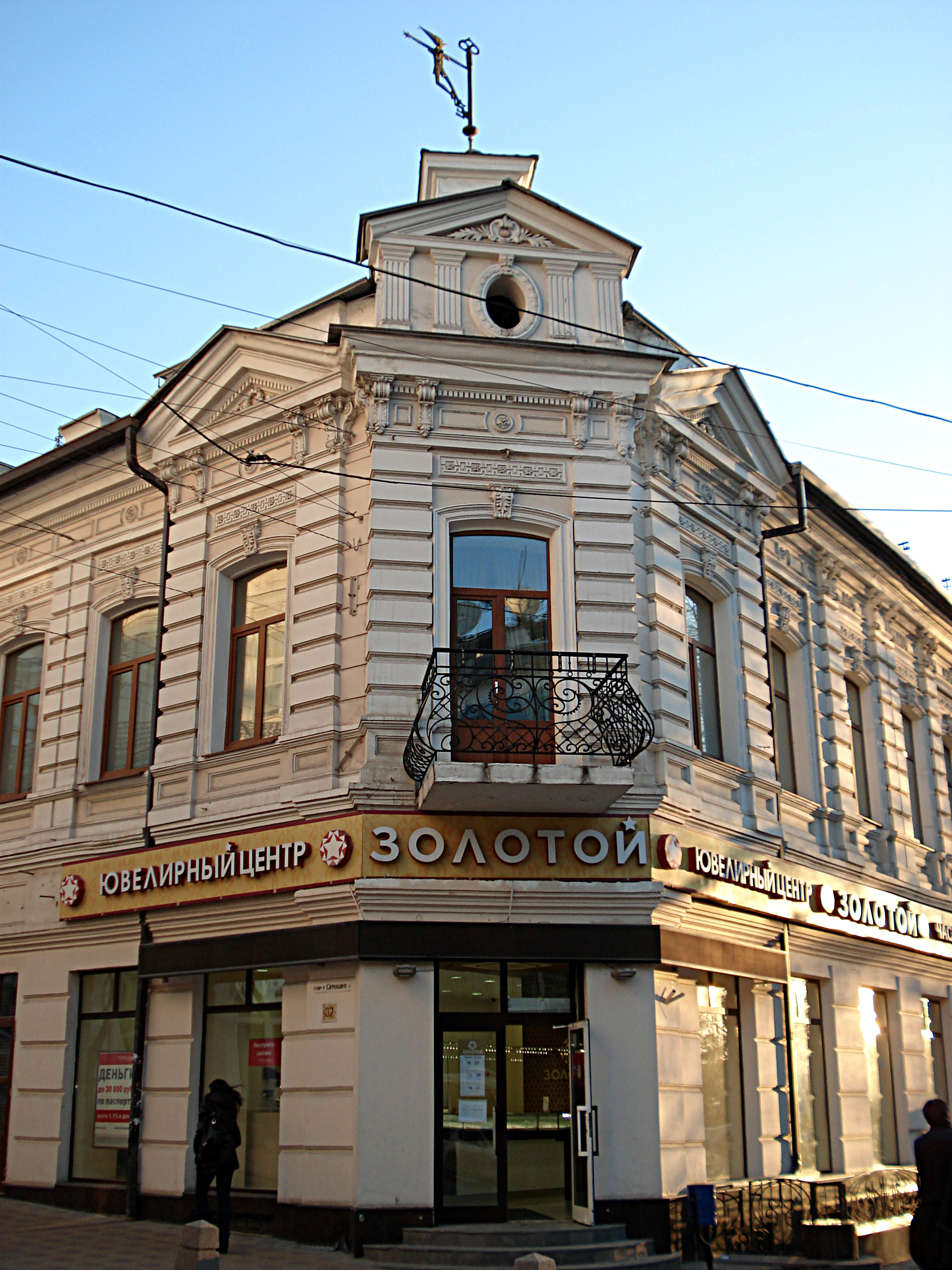
The Kostanayev House in 2017

The Kostanayev House (Russian: Дом Костанаева, romanized: Dom Kostanayeva) is a building in the Leninsky District of Rostov-on-Don, Russia. The house is located at 37 Semashko Lane at the intersection of Bolshaya Sadovaya Street and Semashko Lane. The building was designed in the Beaux-Arts style, and has the status of an object of cultural heritage of regional significance.

== History ==
The Kostanayev House was built in the last quarter of the 19th century.

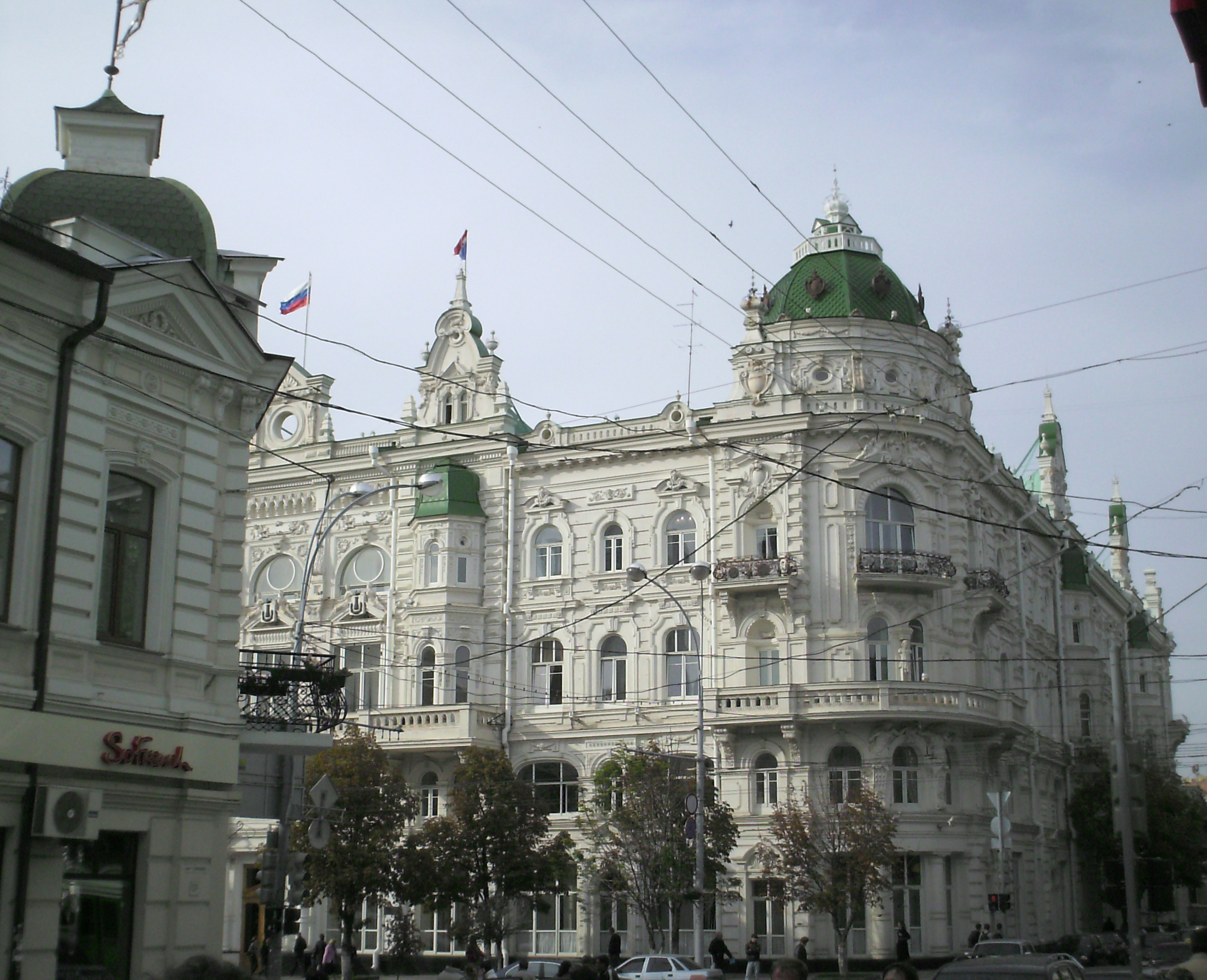
Rostov City Hall, with the corner of the Kostanayev House to the left

Before the revolution of 1917, the house was owned by members of the Kostanayev family. Between 1914 and 1917, the building housed the G. V. and K. Berezhnov trading house.

In the 1920s, the ground floor of the building was occupied by the Alzan trading partnership shop, being succeeded by shop No. 8 of Gorkooptorg, as well as a record and gramophone shop. 1959 records show that by this time the ground floor housed Gorkooptorg's shop No. 8, as well as Gorpromtorg's toy shop No. 69, a watch repair shop, and a jewelry and engraving workshop. In the 1990s, there was a shop named Buratino, and a currency exchange office.

By decree No. 411 of the Head of the Rostov Oblast Administration on 9 October 1998, the house was designated a an object of cultural heritage of regional significance.
