= Enderby's Wharf =

Former industrial site in Greenwich, UK

Coordinates: 51.4901°N 0.0055°E

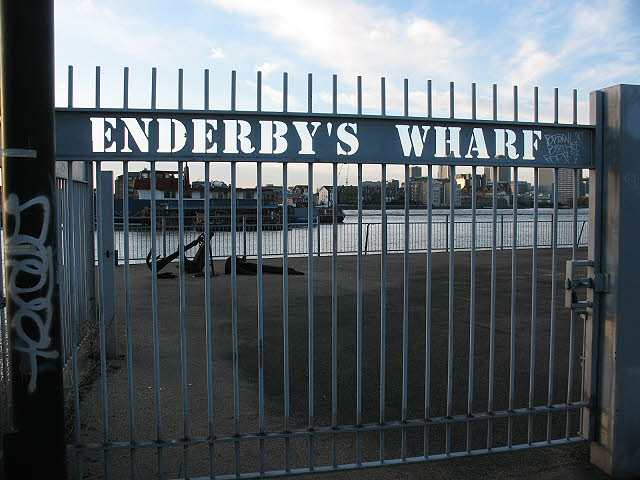
Entrance gate

Enderby's Wharf is a wharf and industrial site on the south bank of the Thames in Greenwich, London, associated with Telcon and other companies. It has a history of more than 150 years of production of submarine communication cables and associated equipment, and is one of the most important sites in the history of submarine communications.

== Location ==
The wharf lies on the Greenwich Peninsula, a little to the north of the historic centre of Greenwich. It is between the Thames and the Blackwall Tunnel approach road, across the river from Cubitt Town. It covers an area of some 16 acres (65,000 m^{2}) and has a frontage of around 600 feet (180 m).

== History ==
The wharf was first developed commercially by the whaling company of Samuel Enderby & Sons. The site was first acquired by Samuel Enderby II, with Morden College assisting in the acquisition of the naval ammunition wharf. It was Samuel Enderby III who initially developed the site along with brothers Charles and George, who acquired the site for a ropeworks. Enderbys also built Enderby House in the early 1830s, which stands today as a listed building among modern housing.

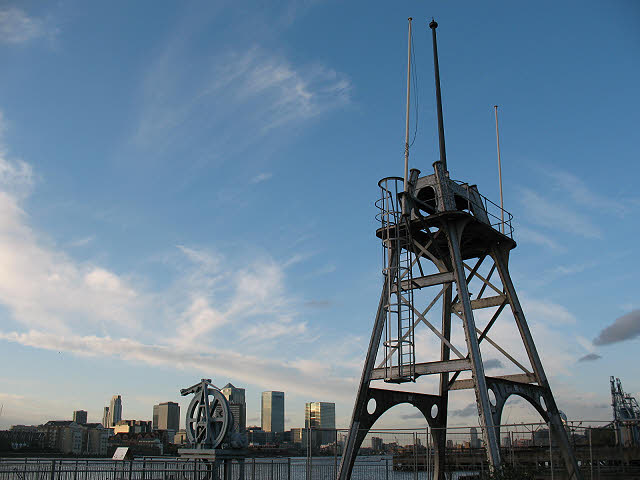
The cable hauler, a winch and gantry used to draw telegraph cables from the factory to a cable-laying ship alongside

In 1857 submarine cable manufacturers Glass, Elliot & Co and W.T.Henley took over the site; Henleys subsequently moved to North Woolwich. As well as jointly making the short-lived first transatlantic telegraph cable, Glass, Elliot supplied many early telegraph cables including Corsica–Sardinia, Lowestoft–Zandvoort, Malta–Alexandria and Sicily–Algeria. In the 1860s Glass, Elliot and the Gutta Percha Company were absorbed into the Telegraph Construction and Maintenance Company (Telcon), (Note: A Crawley-based company called Telcon and claiming a heritage back to 1864 was spun off from BICC in 2006.) which manufactured a second transatlantic telegraph cable at Enderby's Wharf that was successfully laid by the SS Great Eastern. The company went on to manufacture many more transatlantic cables, and others to Australia, New Zealand, India, Hong Kong etc. A cable hauler (a type of winch) and gantry on a jetty, used to draw telegraph cables from the factory to a ship, was made a listed structure in 2025.

In 1935 the site came into the ownership of the newly formed Submarine Cables Ltd. Some of the cross-channel D-Day Pluto pipeline was made at the wharf in World War II. After ownership by BICC and AEI, in 1970 the company passed to STC. Manufacture of submarine cable at the site ended in 1975 (transferring to Southampton), and work concentrated on manufacture of optical repeaters and amplifiers. It subsequently passed to Northern Telecom and then to Alcatel of France in 1994. In 2006 Alcatel merged with American company Lucent Technologies to create Alcatel-Lucent, and the following year their division based at Enderby Wharf was renamed Alcatel-Lucent Submarine Networks, which became Alcatel Submarine Networks after Alcatel-Lucent was acquired by Nokia in 2016.

Around 2010, a large part of the site was sold to Barratt Developments for a housing estate, called Enderby Wharf. Enderby House, the original office building, was within the Barratt site but stood disused for several years before being developed to become a bar and restaurant, which opened in April 2021.

== Proposed cruise ship terminal ==
In 2010 a proposal was made to turn 3 acres (12,000 m^{2}) of the river frontage of the site not in use by Alcatel into a terminal for huge cruise liners, and housing. The proposal (known as 'Enderby Wharf') received planning approval from Greenwich Council in 2011, subject to approval by the Greater London Authority (GLA). Mayor Boris Johnson gave his approval to a revised application for a larger terminal in August 2015.

It was expected that up to 55 large cruise ships would dock there every year. Each would need to run its diesel engines continuously to power onboard facilities, generating large polluting emissions near residential areas and schools. While London has strict regulations on air quality and emissions, they do not apply to the Thames, which is in the jurisdiction of the Port of London Authority (PLA) rather than the GLA. At the London elections in 2016 the Conservative and Labour mayoral candidates joined their Green and Liberal Democrat rivals to support the residents' campaign against the terminal. In 2018 Greenwich council changed its opinion, and called for Morgan Stanley, current owner of Enderby Wharf, to implement a less polluting solution for the cruise terminal. Residents of the area proposed it should be "zero emissions", supporting ships able to use onshore electrical power without the need to run their engines while docked. Some cruise ships already support the use of shore power, while others are being adapted to do so.

In 2019, Morgan Stanley sold the site to Criterion Capital for further housing development.
