= Gutta-percha =

Palaquium trees, and latex made from sap

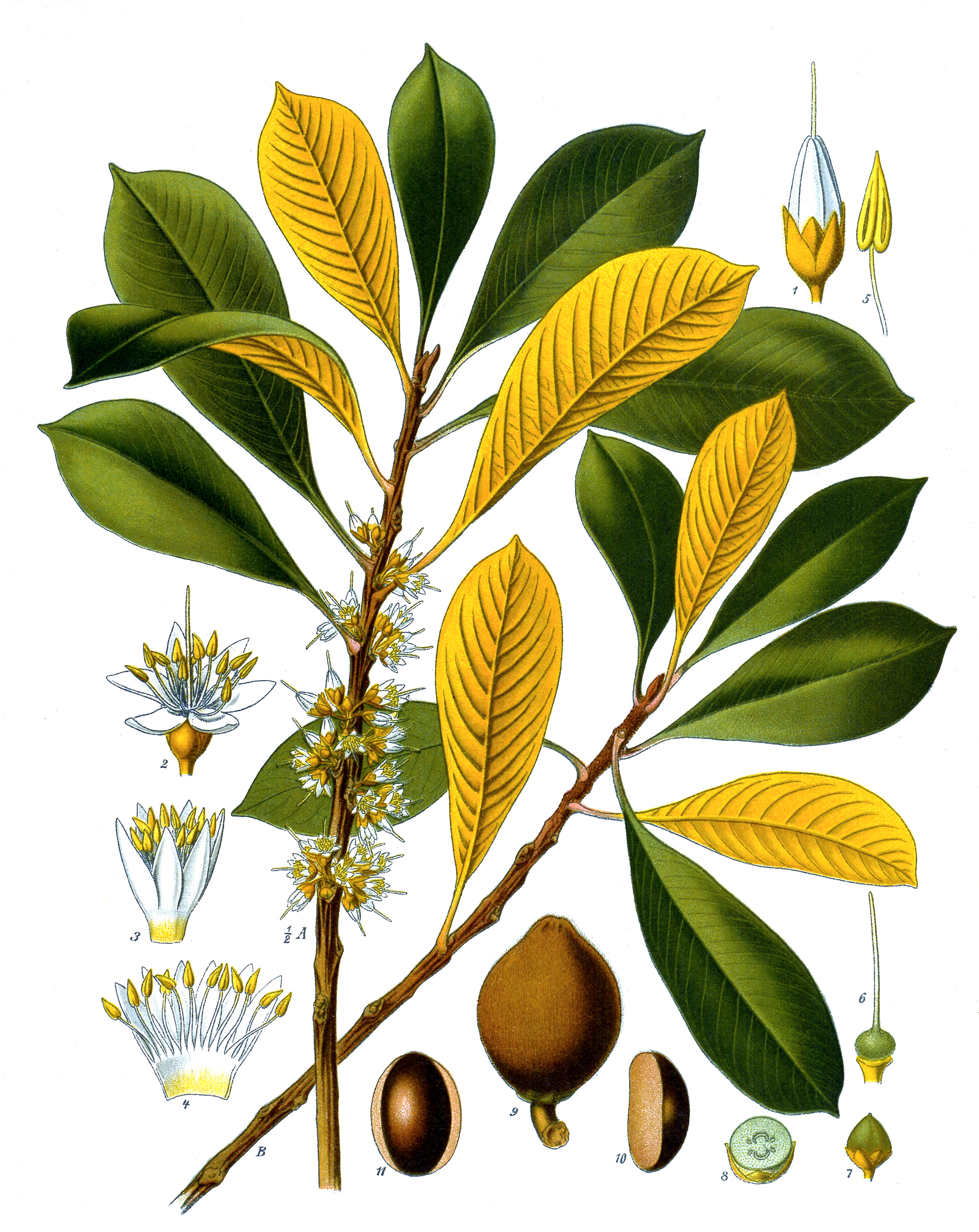
Palaquium gutta

Gutta-percha is a tree of the genus Palaquium in the family Sapotaceae, which is primarily used to create a high-quality latex of the same name. Most commonly sourced from Palaquium gutta, the material is rigid, naturally biologically inert, resilient, electrically nonconductive, and thermoplastic; it is a polymer of isoprene which forms a rubber-like elastomer.

The word "gutta-percha" comes from the plant's name in Malay: getah translates as 'sticky gum' and pertja (perca) is the name of a less-sought-after gutta tree. The western term therefore is likely a derivative amalgamation of the original native names.

== Description ==
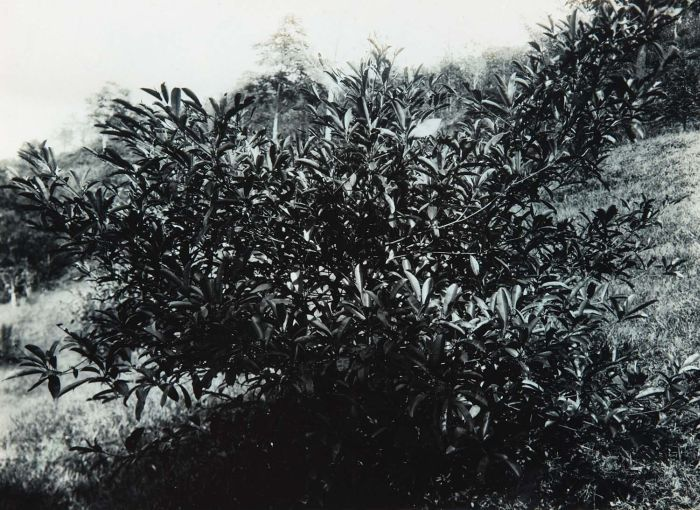
Gutta-percha tree

Palaquium gutta trees are 5–30 metres (20–100 ft) tall and up to 1 m (3 ft) in trunk diameter. The leaves are evergreen, alternate or spirally arranged, simple, entire, 8–25 cm (3–10 in) long, glossy green above, and often yellow or glaucous below. The flowers are produced in small clusters along the stems, each flower with a white corolla with four to seven (mostly six) acute lobes. The fruit is an ovoid 3–7 cm (1–3 in) berry, containing one to four seeds; in many species, the fruit is edible.

In Australia, gutta-percha is a common name specifically used for the euphorbiaceous tree Excoecaria parvifolia, which yields an aromatic, heavy, dark-brown timber.

== Chemistry ==
Chemical structure of gutta-percha

Chemically, gutta-percha is a polyterpene, a polymer of isoprene, or polyisoprene, specifically (trans-1,4-polyisoprene). The cis structure of polyisoprene is natural rubber. While natural rubber is amorphous in molecular structure, gutta-percha (the trans structure) crystallizes, leading to a more rigid material. It exists in alpha and beta forms, with the alpha form being brittle at room temperature.

== Uses ==
=== Historic ===
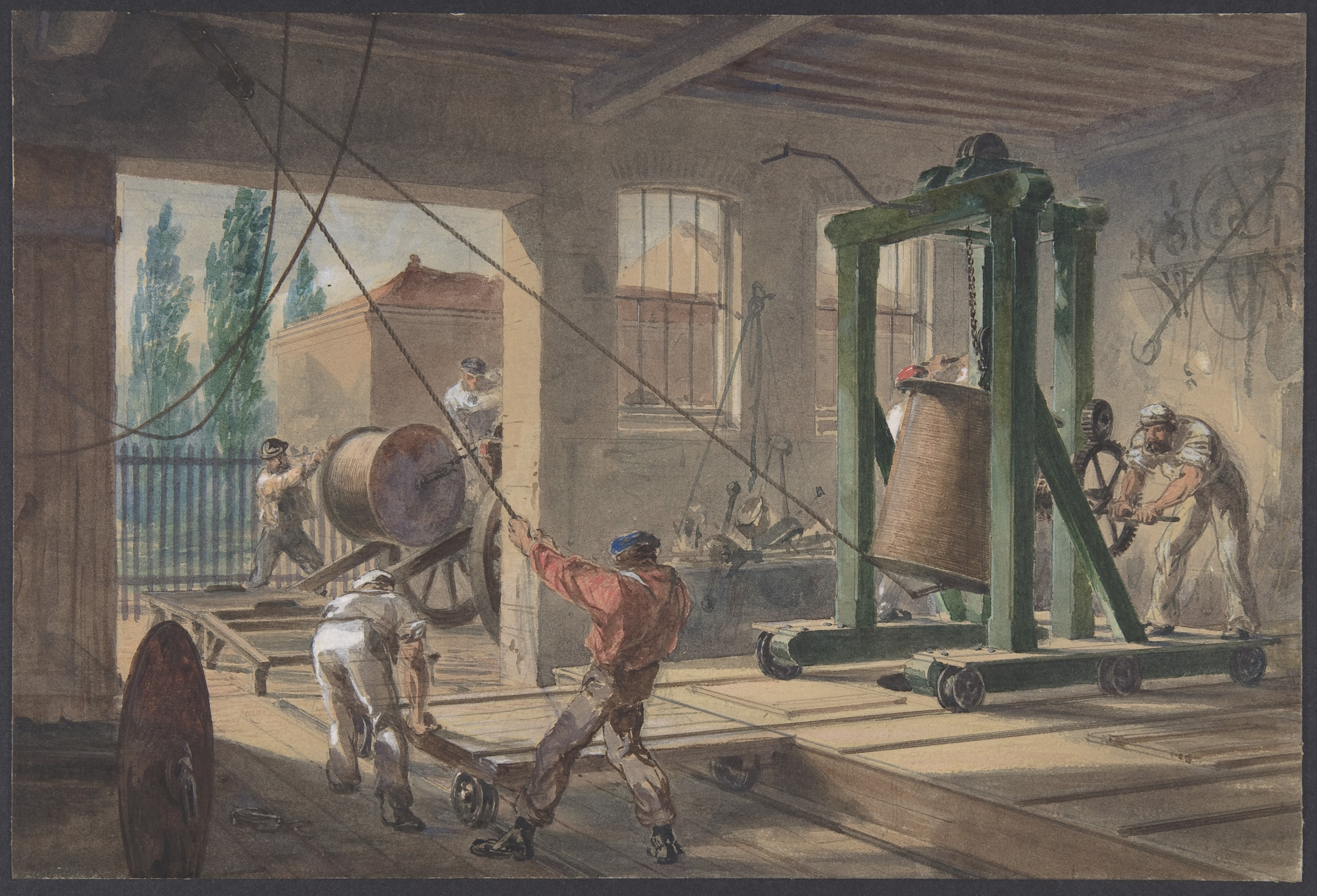
Cable manufacturing with gutta-percha at the Telegraph Construction and Maintenance Company in Greenwich, London, circa 1865

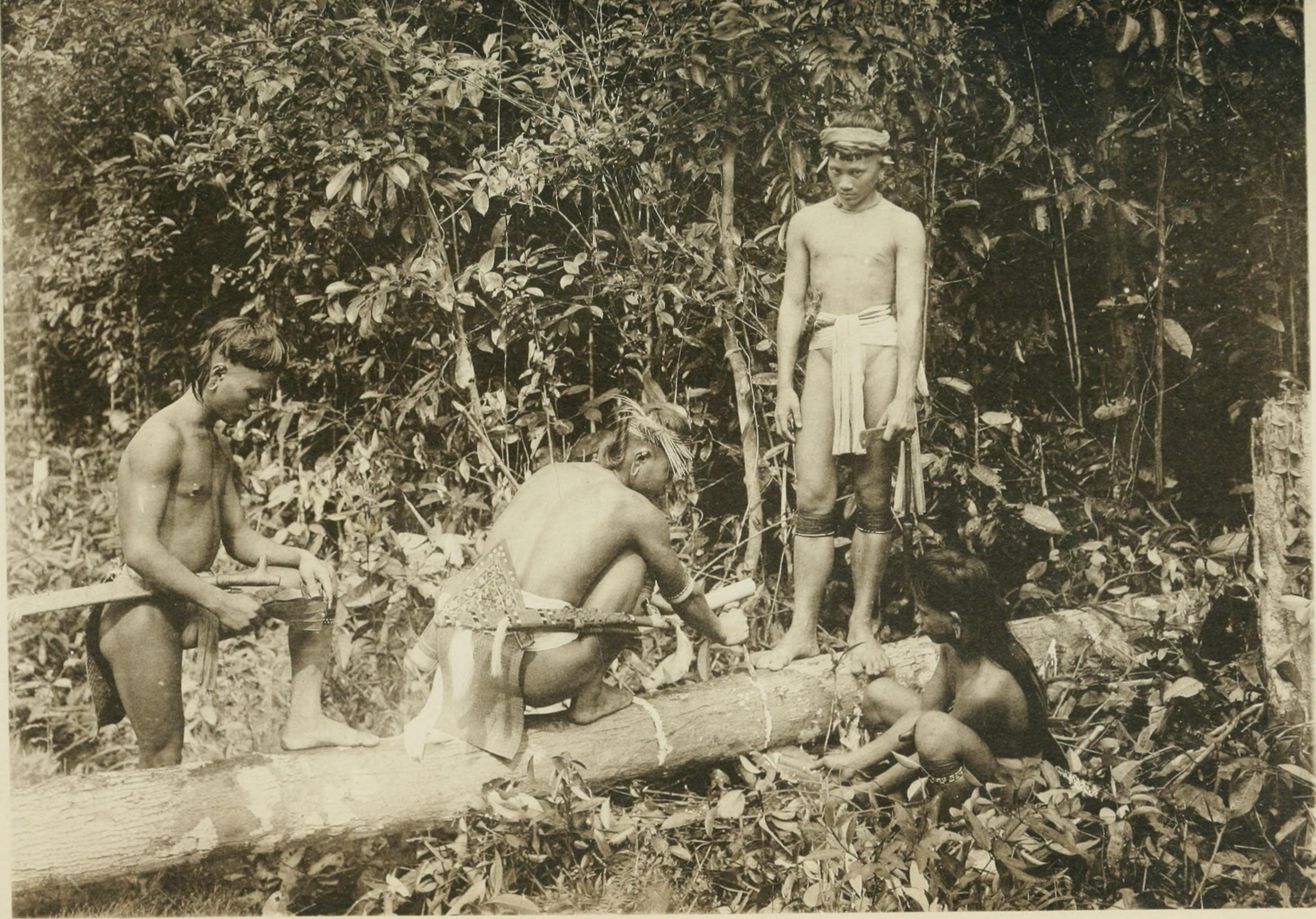
Members of a Kayan tribe in Borneo harvesting the sap of a gutta-percha tree c. 1910

Long before gutta-percha was introduced into the Western world, it was used in a less-processed form by the natives of the Malaysian archipelago for making knife handles, walking sticks, and other purposes. The first European to study this material was John Tradescant, who collected it in the far east in 1656. He named this material "Mazer wood". William Montgomerie, a medical officer in imperial service, introduced gutta-percha into practical use in the West. He was the first to appreciate the potential of this material in medicine, and he was awarded the gold medal by the Royal Society of Arts, London in 1843.

Scientifically classified in 1843, it was found to be a useful natural thermoplastic. In 1851, 30,000 long cwt (1,500 t) of gutta-percha was imported into Britain. During the second half of the 19th century, gutta-percha was used for many domestic and industrial purposes, and it became a household word. Gutta-percha was particularly important for the manufacture of underwater telegraph cables. Compared to rubber, it does not degrade in seawater, is not damaged by marine life, and maintains good electrical insulation. These properties, along with its mouldability and flexibility made it ideal for the purpose, with no other material to match it in the 19th century. The use in electrical cables generated a huge demand which led to unsustainable harvesting and collapse of supply.

Gutta-percha was difficult to harvest. Only trees that had grown for 35 years or more were economical to harvest. Felling a single tree could yield 12 catties (16 pounds) of gutta-percha; cutting boreholes to harvest gutta-percha from a living tree yielded much less, and often killed the tree anyway due to fungal infection.

==== Electrical ====
Gutta-percha latex is biologically inert, resilient, and is a good electrical insulator with a high dielectric strength.

Michael Faraday discovered its value as an insulator soon after the introduction of the material to Britain in 1843. Allowing this fluid to evaporate and coagulate in the sun produced a latex which could be made flexible again with hot water, but which did not become brittle, unlike rubber prior to the discovery of vulcanization.

By 1845, telegraph wires insulated with gutta-percha were being manufactured in the UK. It served as the insulating material for early undersea telegraph cables, including the first transatlantic telegraph cable. The material was a major constituent of Chatterton's compound used as an insulating sealant for telegraph and other electrical cables.

The dielectric constant of dried gutta-percha ranges from 2.56 to 3.01. Resistivity of dried gutta-percha ranges from 25×10^{14} to 370×10^{14} Ω⋅cm.

Since about 1940, polyethylene has supplanted gutta-percha as an electrical insulator.

==== Other ====
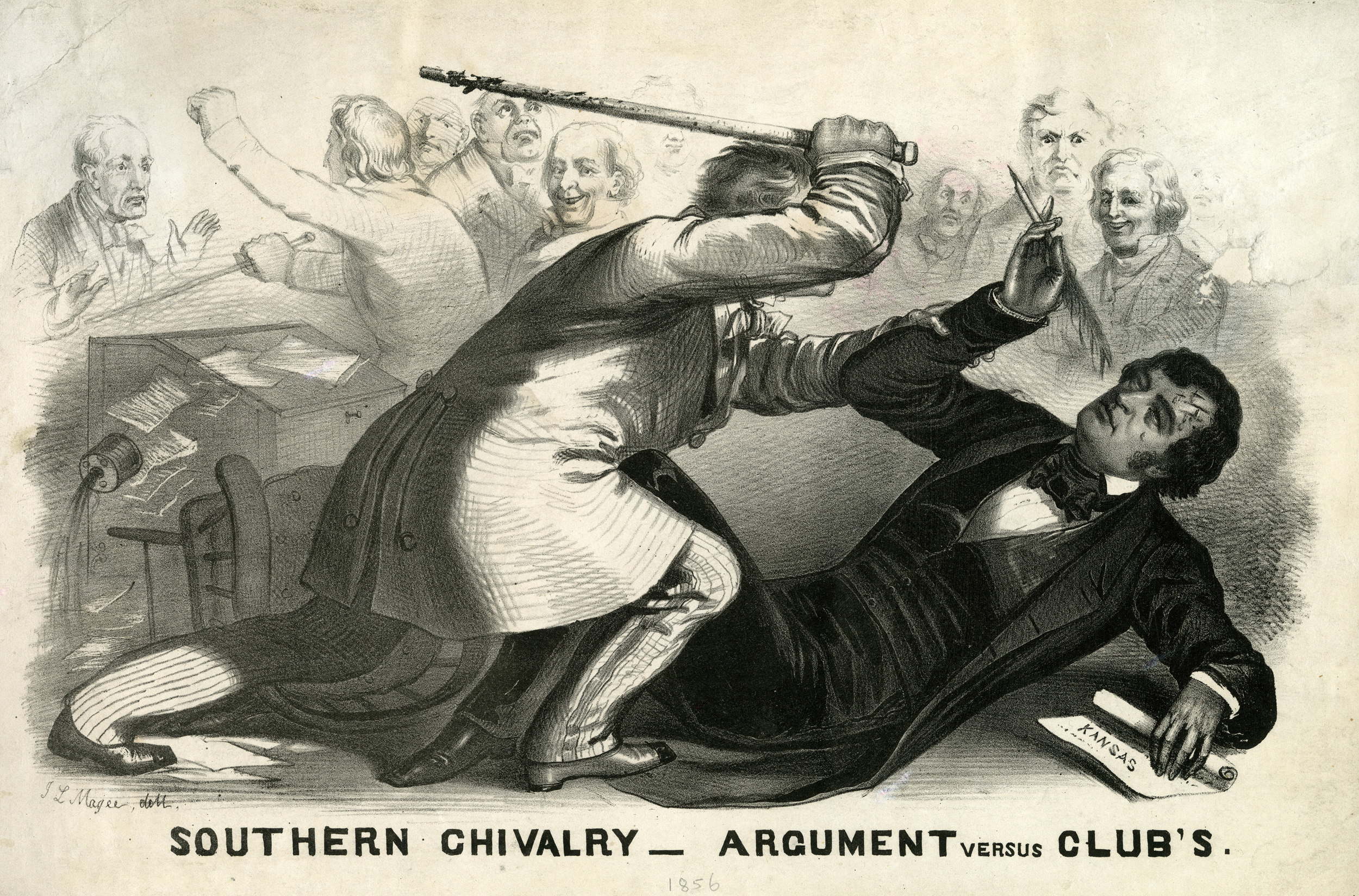
Lithograph depicting the caning of Charles Sumner with a cane made of gutta-percha

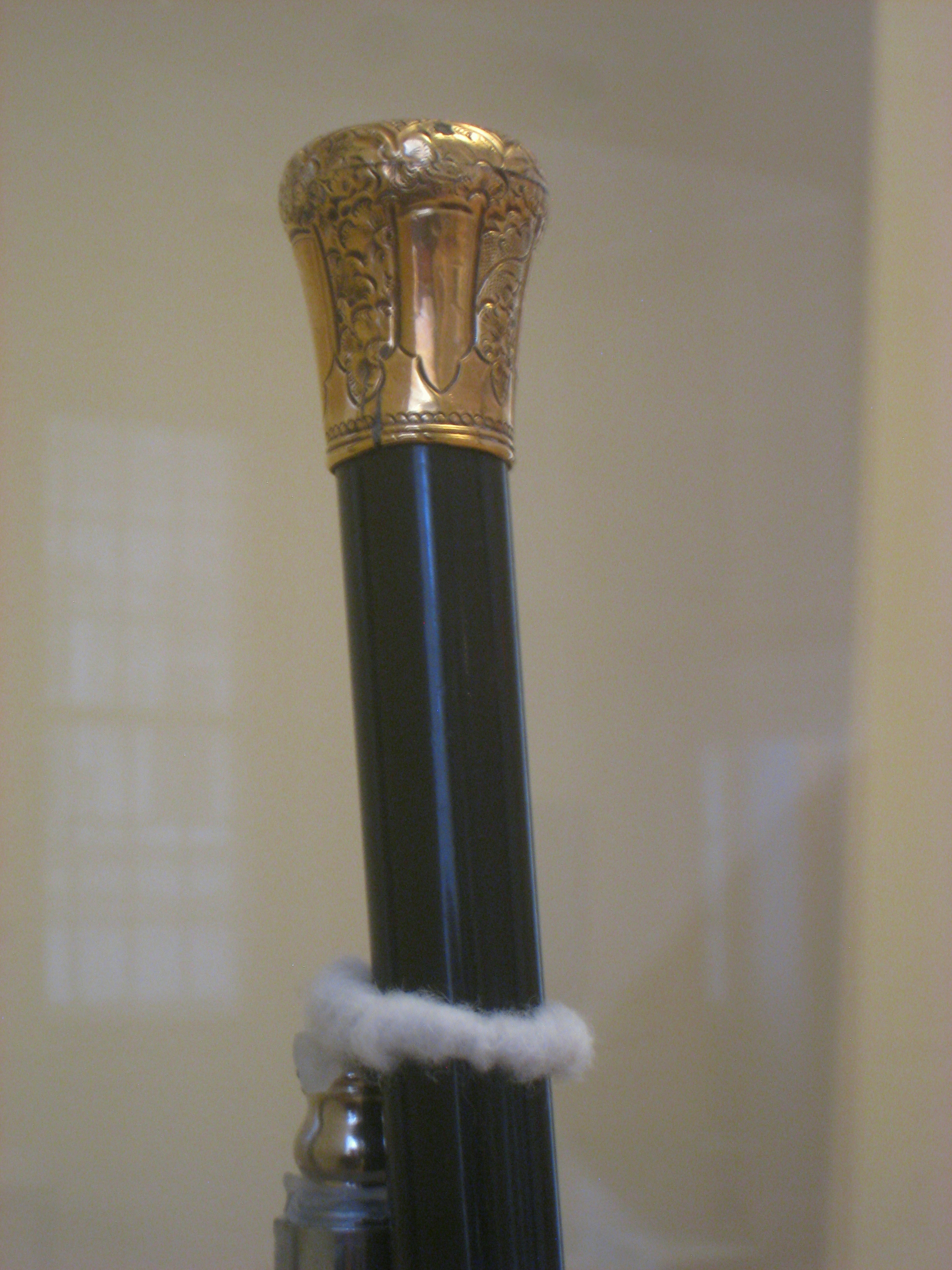
The gutta-percha cane used by Preston Brooks to attack Charles Sumner on the floor of the United States Senate in 1856 (in the collection of the Old State House museum, Boston, Massachusetts)

In the mid-19th century, gutta-percha was used to make furniture, notably by the Gutta Percha Company, established in 1847 in England. Several of these ornate, revival-style pieces were shown at the 1851 Great Exhibition in Hyde Park, London. The company also made a range of utensils.

The "guttie" golf ball (which had a solid gutta-percha core) revolutionized the game. Gutta-percha was used to make "mourning" jewelry, because it was dark in color and could be easily molded into beads or other shapes. Pistol hand grips and rifle shoulder pads were also made from gutta-percha, since it was hard and durable, though it fell into disuse when synthetic plastics such as Bakelite became available.

Gutta-percha was used in canes and walking sticks. In 1856, United States Representative Preston Brooks used a cane made of gutta-percha as a weapon in his attack on Senator Charles Sumner.

In the 1860s, gutta-percha was used to reinforce the soles of football players' boots before it was banned by The Football Association in the first codified set of rules in 1863.

Gutta-percha was briefly used in bookbinding until the advent of vulcanization.

=== Today ===
==== Art ====
Gutta-percha is used as a resist in silk painting, including some newer forms of batik.

==== Dentistry ====
The same biocompatibility that made it suitable for marine cables, also means it does not readily react within the human body. It is used in a variety of surgical devices and during root canal therapy. It is the predominant material used to obturate, or fill, the empty space inside the root of a tooth after it has undergone endodontic therapy. Its physical and chemical properties, including its inertness and biocompatibility, melting point, ductility, and malleability, make it important in endodontics, e.g., as gutta-percha points. Zinc oxide is added to reduce brittleness and improve plasticity. Barium sulfate is added to provide radiopacity so that its presence and location can be verified in dental X-ray images.

== Substitutes ==
Gutta-percha remained an industrial staple well into the 20th century, when it was gradually replaced with superior synthetic materials, such as Bakelite.

A similar and cheaper natural material called balatá was often used in gutta-percha's place. The two materials are almost identical, and balatá is often called gutta-balatá.

== See also ==
- Natural rubber
- Gutta-percha Boy, a 1957 Soviet drama film
