= William Montgomerie =

Scottish surgeon

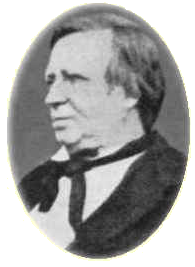
William Montgomerie

William Montgomerie (1797–1856) was a Scottish military doctor with the East India Company, and later head of the medical department at Singapore. He is best known for promoting the use of gutta-percha in Europe. This material was an important natural rubber that made submarine telegraph cables possible. Montgomerie was involved in spice cultivation as head of the Singapore botanical experimental gardens and at his personal estate in Singapore. The latter never became economically viable, but he received a Society of Arts gold medal for nutmeg cultivation. He was also responsible for building the first lunatic asylum in Singapore. Montgomerie died at Barrackpore in India a few years after taking part in the Second Anglo-Burmese War as Superintendent Surgeon.

== Early life and family ==
Montgomerie was born in Scotland in 1797. In 1827, he married Elizabeth Graham in Calcutta. A son is mentioned in a newspaper article. His brother was Major-General Sir P. Montgomerie of the Madras Artillery who fought in the First Opium War.

== Career ==
In 1818, Montgomerie became a medical officer with the East India Company and was posted to India. In May 1819, he was posted to Singapore with the 2nd Battalion of the 20th Regiment of Bengal Native Infantry with the rank of Assistant Surgeon. (Note: The term "surgeon" was used by the military Indian Medical Service to designate a medical officer's rank. It did not indicate whether or not the officer practiced surgery. Surgeon ranks, in order of descending seniority were; Surgeon-Major, Surgeon, Assistant Surgeon, Sub-assistant Surgeon (Teo, p. 25).) Upon his arrival, he took over as senior surgeon of Singapore from a more junior officer, and was given the rank of acting Surgeon. In 1827, Montgomerie was posted back to Bengal. In 1835, the medical department headquarters was moved from Penang to Singapore, whereupon Montgomerie was made the head. He retired to England in January 1844. He was recalled to Bengal some years later as Garrison Surgeon at Fort William, Calcutta, and was Superintendent Surgeon in the field during the Second Anglo-Burmese War (1852–1853). He died of cholera at Barrackpore, India, on 21 March 1856 and was buried in Fort William.

While he was stationed at Singapore, Montgomerie was usually the doctor attending Singapore's leaders. These included Stamford Raffles, the founder of Singapore, and William Farquhar, who was stabbed by a would-be assassin in 1823. Farquhar had expressed concern over Montgomerie's youth when he arrived in Singapore in 1819. Montgomerie was very young at this point, even younger than the Sub-assistant Surgeon from whom he took over and was now in charge. If anything happened to Farquhar, Montgomerie would have been left in charge of Singapore as the next most senior official. Farquhar wrote to Calcutta asking them to put alternative arrangements in place.

In Singapore, Montgomerie was appointed a magistrate in 1819, head of the botanical experimental gardens in 1823 (where he concentrated on cultivating spices), and sheriff in 1837.

== Agriculture ==
Montgomerie keenly pursued agriculture in Singapore. He owned the 32-acre (13 ha) Duxton Hill estate for most of his time there, but never succeeded in making it profitable. It was sold after his death and briefly renamed "Woodsville". The area is now built-up and the name has reverted to Duxton Hill, a name also preserved in Duxton Road. The primary crop grown was sugar, but later he planted nutmeg trees. The estate was bounded by a river where Montgomerie had a large watermill. A short distance from the mill, the Serangoon Road crosses the river on a crossing known as Montgomerie's Bridge.

=== Spice cultivation ===
On his return to Singapore in 1835, Montgomerie found that the government spice plantations had been neglected. The clove crop had been destroyed by blight, but since the nutmeg trees still looked healthy, Montgomerie decided to start his own plantation with seeds procured from Penang. He believed that enough nutmeg could be grown in Singapore to supply the entire British Empire by 1850, and that the price could be driven down to something affordable by ordinary people. However, he complained that the government land leasing arrangements were not favourable in Singapore, and discouraged farming. He compared this to Ceylon (now known as Sri Lanka, but at the time a British possession) where land could be bought outright. In 1842, Montgomerie sent a box of nutmeg and mace to the Society of Arts (later to become the Royal Society) for which he was awarded a gold medal.

== Gutta-percha ==
Gutta-percha is a natural rubber obtained from the sap of certain trees growing in the Far East. It hardens on exposure to air, but has the useful property of being thermoplastic. It can be moulded to a new shape after boiling in water and will reharden when cool. It is credited with being the first plastic available to manufacturing industry.

Montgomerie is sometimes credited with discovering the substance. He is responsible for it coming into widespread use, but it had in fact been known for some time by a few natives who used it to make handles for parangs (Malayan machetes) and other items. However, it was not widely known, even amongst native Malays. Montgomerie said that most people he showed it to could not recognise it. It had even made its way to Europe, (Note: As early as 1656, John Tradescant had brought a material to England which he called mazer wood and which is thought to be gutta-percha because of the similarity in its properties (Straits Times, 1884; Baker, p. 89). José d'Almeida, a Portuguese doctor and trader in Singapore, also brought samples to the Society of Arts around the same time as Montgomerie after seeing native whips made from the material (Oxley, p. 22).) but again, was not widely known. Montgomerie's discovery began in 1822 when he was shown a different natural rubber, gutta girek, and was told of the existence of a harder material, gutta percha. However, he could not obtain a sample at the time and did not get another opportunity until 1842 after he returned to Singapore. In that year a Malay showed him a parang with a gutta-percha handle. Montgomerie purchased the item and requested that more of the substance be provided. After experimentation, he concluded that its thermoplastic properties would be ideal for making many surgical instruments. The natural rubbers used for this purpose at the time were easily damaged by solvents and could not withstand the tropical climate.

Montgomerie sent samples to the Calcutta Medical Board with a recommendation for its medical use. The board agreed with him and requested that he obtain as much as possible. Montgomerie also sent samples to the Royal Asiatic Society in London in 1843. He began an investigation into how widespread the tree was. He discovered that it was not only found in Singapore, but all over the Malaysian peninsula and the islands of Indonesia and appeared to be plentiful. However, as early as 1846 Montgomerie was expressing fears that supplies would dry up due to the destructive method of harvesting and large quantities being produced. (Note: Oxley also noted the fast depopulation of gutta-percha trees in Singapore (Oxley, p. 24)) Trees were cut down and the bark stripped to get to the sap. Montgomerie believed that it was possible to harvest the sap by tapping but did not think it would be possible to persuade the native collectors to use this slower, but more sustainable method.

Besides its use for making medical instruments, Montgomerie proposed several other uses, including as a dental filling (for which it is still used). Numerous other applications were quickly found for the new material, including a much improved golf ball. However, the most important application was as an electrical insulator. This was essential for the worldwide telegraph network as it made possible the transatlantic telegraph cable and other links across oceans. No better material was available until the invention of polyethylene in the 1930s.

== Mental health medicine ==
It was the custom in Singapore to house 'lunatics' in the jail. Natives and Chinese were confined in this way, while Europeans enjoyed better treatment. It was part of Montgomerie's duties to visit the jail daily to attend to their needs. There had been public disquiet about the lack of proper facilities, but nothing was done until 1840 when one mentally ill inmate murdered another. Montgomerie was tasked with investigating and making recommendations. He recommended a purpose-built lunatic asylum and submitted plans and costings. He rejected an alternative idea of sending patients to India. Montgomerie's plan was accepted and the asylum was built.

== Singapore Stone ==
Montgomerie played a minor role in recovering pieces of the Singapore Stone after it was demolished by explosives in 1843. The stone was a large rock in the Singapore River bearing an ancient and undeciphered inscription. It was destroyed by the Settlement Engineer to clear the river channel. Montgomerie had intended to set up a Singapore museum, but was unable to do so. Instead, he sent the pieces he recovered to the Asiatic Society museum in Calcutta around 1848. In 1918, some of the fragments recovered by Montgomerie were returned to Singapore on extended loan and are now in the National Museum of Singapore.

The destruction of the stone horrified many of the colony's officials. One described it as vandalism. The stone was first discovered by Bengali sailors tasked with clearing the vegetation by the port's first Master Attendant. On seeing the strange inscription, they refused to carry on. Montgomerie commented "it was a pity that those who afterwards authorised the destruction of the ancient relic were not themselves prevented by some such wholesome superstition."

== Honours ==
- Society of Arts Gold Medal 1844. (Note: Oxley, and several other sources, say that Montgomerie got the medal for the discovery of gutta-percha (Oxley, p. 22). This may be an error since the RSA citation flatly contradicts this. The alternative explanation that there were two different medals awarded is not found in any source of this article. If it is an error, Montgomerie himself was under the same misapprehension, since he also says he got the medal for gutta-percha (Montgomerie, p. 378). It is entirely possible that Montgomerie misunderstood the award. He was in Singapore at the time, and the award was collected on his behalf by his brother-in-law, H. Gouger, in London (RSA Transactions, p. 60). In the age before the establishment of the worldwide telegraph, communications were slow and unreliable.) Awarded for "the cultivation of nutmegs in that island [Singapore], samples of which have been placed in the Society's repository."

== Recreation ==
Montgomerie was the head of the Singapore Yacht Club when it formed in 1826. Meetings were held in his house. The game of fives was introduced to Singapore by Montgomerie. He initially played it in the medical store. He was honoured with a dinner in February 1836 for introducing the game. In 1827, a grand jury in Singapore decided gambling farms should be abolished. Montgomerie is said to have remarked, "I did not think there were thirteen such idiots in the entire island."

== Bibliography ==
- Arrighi, R., "From impregnated paper to polymeric insulating materials in power cables", IEEE Transactions on Electrical Insulation, vol. EI-21, iss. 1, pp. 7–18, February 1986.
- Baker, Ian, "Gutta percha" pp. 89–91 in Fifty Materials That Make the World, Springer, 2018 ISBN 9783319787664.
- Brooke, Gilbert E., "Archeological and heraldic notes", p. 567–577 in Makepeace, Walter; Brooke, Gilbert E.; Braddell, Roland St. J. (eds.), One Hundred Years of Singapore, vol. 1, London: John Murray, 1921 OCLC 867885390.
- Buckley, Charles Burton, An Anecdotal History of Old Times in Singapore, vol. 1, Singapore: Fraser & Neave, 1902 OCLC 220728943.
- Lee, Y. K., "The Mental Diseases Hospital, Singapore (the first 100 years) – a short history (part I)", Singapore Medical Journal, vol. 33, iss. 4, pp. 386–392, August 1992.
- Miksic, John N., Singapore & the Silk Road of the Sea, 1300–1800, NUS Press, 2013 ISBN 997169574X.
- Montgomerie, William, "History of the introduction of gutta percha into England", Pharmaceutical Journal, vol. 6, no. 8, pp. 377–381, 1 February 1847 (originally published in Mechanics' Magazine, October 1846).
- Oxley, Thomas, "Gutta Percha", The Journal of the Indian Archipelago and Eastern Asia, vol. 1, pp. 22–29, 1847.
- Picker, John M., "Atlantic cable", Victorian Review, vol. 34, no. 1, pp. 34–38, Spring 2008.
- Prakash, R.; Gopikrishna, V.; Kandaswamy, D., "Gutta-percha – an untold story", Endodontology, vol. 17, iss. 2, pp. 32–36, December 2005.
- Savage, Victor R.; Yeoh, Brenda, Singapore Street Names: A Study of Toponymics, Marshall Cavendish International Asia, 2013 ISBN 9814484741.
- Teo, Cuthbert, "A glimpse into the past – medicine in Singapore (part 1)", SMA News, vol. 46, no. 5, pp. 24–27, Singapore Medical Association, May 2014.
- Trocki, Carl A., Prince of Pirates: The Temenggongs and the Development of Johor and Singapore, 1784–1885, National University of Singapore Press, 2007 ISBN 9971693763.

- "Cultivation of nutmegs at Singapore", Transactions of the Royal Society of Arts, vol. 54 (1843–1844), pp. 38–50.
- "Gutta Percha", Plastics Historical Society, retrieved and archived 24 November 2018.
- "The discovery of gutta percha in Singapore", The Straits Times, p. 3, 10 March 1884.
- "William Montgomerie", Plastics Historical Society, retrieved and archived 24 November 2018.
- "William Montgomerie arrives in Singapore", HistorySG, Singapore Government, retrieved and archived 25 November 2018.
