= Atlantic Telegraph Company =

Anglo-American telecommunications firm

- House flag

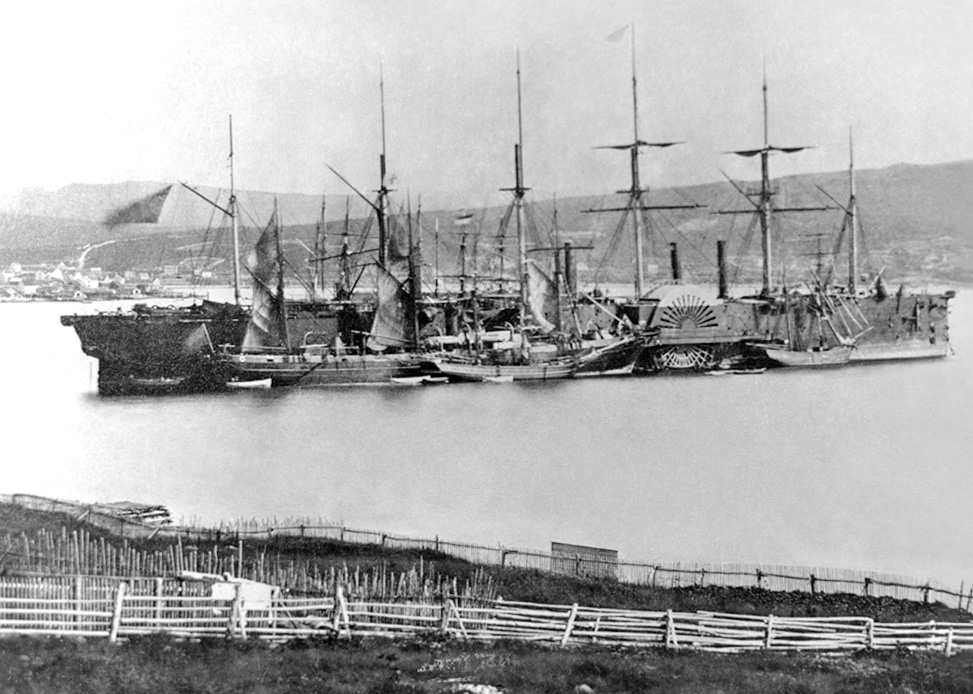
- Great Eastern iron sailing steam ship, used to lay the transatlantic telegraph cable.
- Industry: Telegraphy
- Founded: 1856
- Founders: Cyrus Field, John Watkins Brett, Charles Tilston Bright
- Fate: 1870 merged with New York, Newfoundland and London Telegraph Company and French Atlantic Cable Company
- Subsidiaries: Telegraph Construction and Maintenance Company

The Atlantic Telegraph Company was a company formed on 6 November 1856 to undertake and exploit a commercial telegraph cable across the Atlantic Ocean, the first such telecommunications link.

== History ==
Cyrus Field, American businessman and financier, set his sights on laying the first transatlantic underwater telegraph cable after having been contacted by Frederic Newton Gisborne who attempted to connect St. John's, Newfoundland to New York City, but failed due to lack of funding. After inquiring about the feasibility of a transatlantic underwater cable to Lieutenant Matthew Fontaine Maury of the U.S. Navy, Field formed an agreement with the Englishmen John Watkins Brett and Charles Tilston Bright to create the Atlantic Telegraph Company. It was incorporated in December, 1856 with £350,000 capital, raised principally in London, Liverpool, Manchester, and Glasgow. The board of directors was composed of eighteen members from the United Kingdom, nine from the United States, and three from Canada. The original three projectors were joined by E.O.W. Whitehouse, who oversaw the manufacturing of the cables as chief electrician. Curtis M. Lampson served as vice-chairman for over a decade.

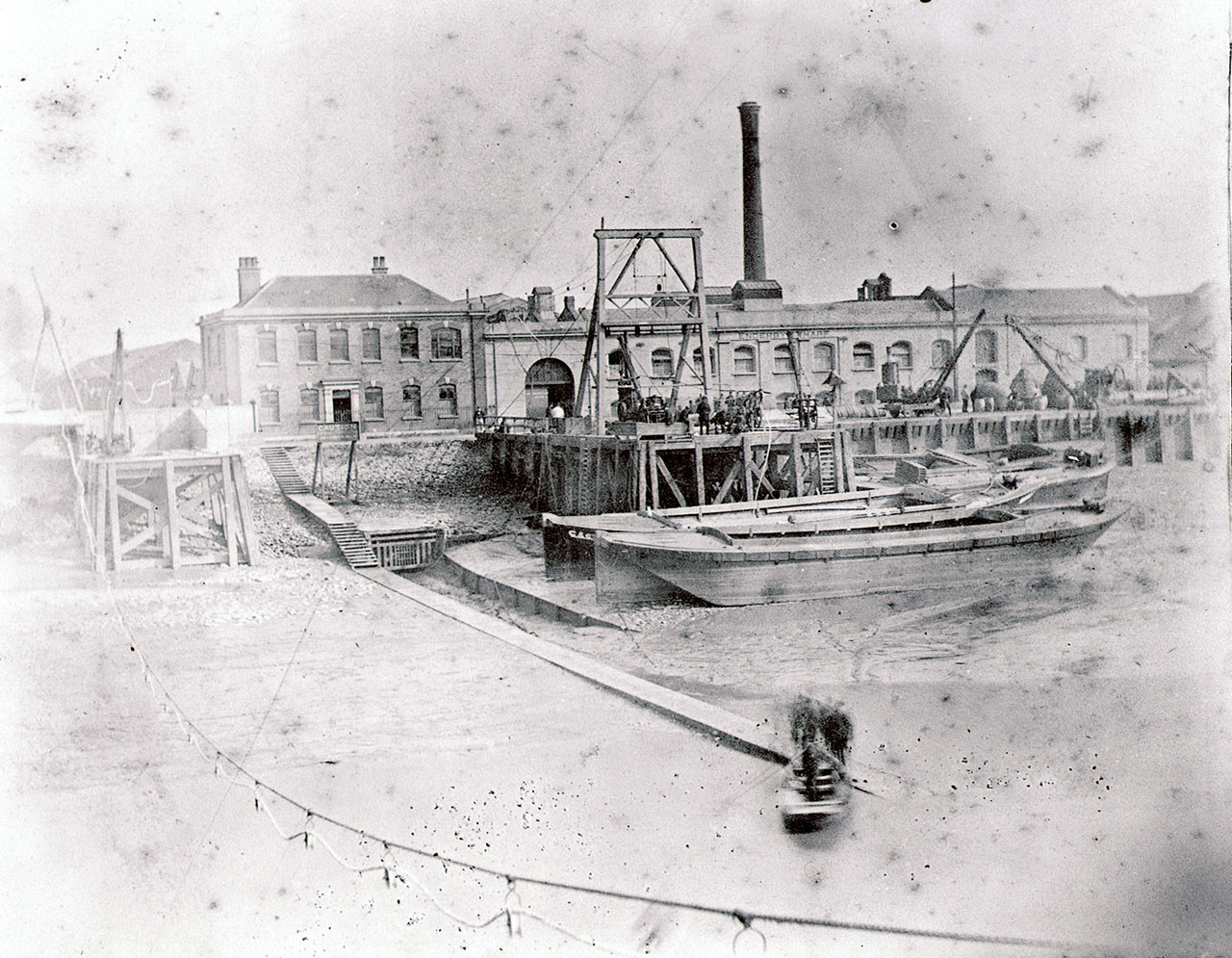
Telegraph Construction and Maintenance Company works, at Enderbys Wharf.

The board recruited the physicist William Thomson (later Lord Kelvin), who had publicly disputed some of Whitehouse's claims. The two had a tense relationship before Whitehouse was dismissed when the first cable failed in 1858. Later that year, another attempt was made to connect North America and Europe. This attempt was completed on August 5, 1858 and was celebrated by an exchange of messages between Queen Victoria of England and President Buchanan of the United States using the new cable line.

When a second cable, under Thomson's supervision, was proposed, the Admiralty lent the hulks of HMS Amethyst and HMS Iris to the company in 1864, both ships were then extensively modified in 1865 for ferrying the Atlantic cable from the works at Enderby's wharf, in East Greenwich, London, to Great Eastern at her Sheerness mooring. A new subsidiary company, the Telegraph Construction and Maintenance Company, under the chairmanship of John Pender was formed to execute the new venture.

The cable was coiled down into great cylindrical tanks at the wharf before being fed into Great Eastern. Amethyst and Iris transferred the 2,500 miles (4,022 km) of cable to Great Eastern, beginning in February 1865, an operation that took over three months.

On the failure of the expedition to lay the second cable in 1865, a third company was formed to raise the capital for a further attempt, the Anglo-American Telegraph Company. Both the hulks and Great Eastern were put to use again in 1866 and again in 1869.

The next expedition in 1866 was a success, also succeeding in recovering the lost second cable. The service generated revenues of £1,000 in its first day of operation. The approximate price to send a telegram was: one word, one mile (1.6 km) = $0.0003809.

The Atlantic Telegraph Company operated the only two trans-Atlantic cables without competition until 1869, when a French cable was laid. Shortly after this company was established, an agreement was made to coordinate pricing of telegraph services and share revenues, effectively combining the French and Anglo-American interests into one combine. A second French company, compagnie française du télégraphe de Paris à New-York, was established in 1879.

== Anglo-American Telegraph Company ==
House flag of Anglo-American Telegraph Company.

The Anglo-American Telegraph Company was founded after the failed attempt of laying a second cable by the Atlantic Telegraph Company in 1865. The new telegraph company took over the assets of the New York, Newfoundland, and London Telegraph Company and later merged with The French Transatlantic Cable Company in 1869. The new company set out to recover the lost cable using the CS Albany and CS Medway, working together with The Atlantic Telegraph Company until the two merged in 1873. They then went on to lay two more cables in 1873 and 1874 from Hearts Content, Newfoundland to Valentia Island by CS Robert Lowe in 1873 and CS Minia in 1874.

== Archive ==
Secretariat records (two volumes) of the Anglo-American Telegraph Company, 1866-1869, are held by BT Archives.
