= Law of squares =

Theorem concerning transmission lines

The law of squares is a theorem concerning transmission lines. It states that the current injected into the line by a step in voltage reaches a maximum at a time proportional to the square of the distance down the line. The theorem is due to William Thomson, the future Lord Kelvin. The law was of crucial importance to the first submarine telegraph cables.

== The law ==
For a step increase in the voltage applied to a transmission line, the law of squares can be stated as follows,

$$t_\text {max} = {1 \over 2} RCx^2$$

where,

$t_\text {max}$ is the time at which the current on the line reaches a maximum
$R$ is the resistance per metre of the line
$C$ is the capacitance per metre of the line
$x$ is the distance in metres from the input of the line.

The law of squares is not just limited to step functions. It also applies to an impulse response or a rectangular function which are more relevant to telegraphy. However, the multiplicative factor is different in these cases. For an impulse it is 1/6 rather than 1/2 and for rectangular pulses it is something in between depending on their length.

== History ==
The law of squares was proposed by William Thomson (later to become Lord Kelvin) in 1854 at Glasgow University. He had some input from George Gabriel Stokes. Thomson and Stokes were interested in investigating the feasibility of the proposed transatlantic telegraph cable.

Thomson built his result by analogy with the heat transfer theory of Joseph Fourier (the transmission of an electrical step down a line is analogous to suddenly applying a fixed temperature at one end of a metal bar). He found that the equation governing the instantaneous voltage on the line, $v (x,t)$ is given by,

$$\frac {\partial ^2 v}{\partial x^2} = RC \frac {\partial v}{\partial t}.$$

It is from this that he derived the law of squares. While Thomson's description of a transmission line is not exactly incorrect, and it is perfectly adequate for the low frequencies involved in a Victorian telegraph cable, it is not the complete picture. In particular, Thomson did not take into account the inductance (L) of the line, or the leakage conductivity (G) of the insulation material. The full description was given by Oliver Heaviside in what is now known as the telegrapher's equations. The law of squares can be derived from a special case of the telegrapher's equations – that is, with L and G set to zero.

== Disbelief ==
Thomson's result is quite counter-intuitive and led to some disbelieving it. The result that most telegraph engineers expected was that the delay in the peak would be directly proportional to line length. Telegraphy was in its infancy and many telegraph engineers were self taught. They tended to mistrust academics and rely instead on practical experience. Even as late as 1887, the author of a letter to The Electrician wished to "...protest against the growing tendency to drag mathematics into everything."

One opponent of Thomson was of particular significance, Wildman Whitehouse, who challenged Thomson when he presented the theorem to the British Association in 1855. Both Thomson and Whitehouse were associated with the transatlantic telegraph cable project, Thomson as an unpaid director and scientific advisor, and Whitehouse as the Chief Electrician of the Atlantic Telegraph Company. Thomson's discovery threatened to derail the project, or at least, indicated that a much larger cable was required (a larger conductor will reduce $R$ and a thicker insulator will reduce $C$). Whitehouse had no advanced mathematical education (he was a doctor by training) and did not fully understand Thomson's work. He claimed he had experimental evidence that Thomson was wrong, but his measurements were poorly conceived and Thomson refuted his claims, showing that Whitehouse's results were consistent with the law of squares.

Whitehouse believed that a thinner cable could be made to work with a high voltage induction coil. The Atlantic Telegraph Company, in a hurry to push ahead with the project, went with Whitehouse's cheaper solution rather than Thomson's. After the cable was laid, it suffered badly from retardation, an effect that had first been noticed by Latimer Clark in 1853 on the Anglo-Dutch submarine cable of the Electric Telegraph Company. Retardation causes a delay and a lengthening of telegraph pulses, the latter as if one part of the pulse has been retarded more than the other. Retardation can cause adjacent telegraph pulses to overlap making them unreadable, an effect now called intersymbol interference. It forced telegraph operators to send more slowly to restore a space between pulses. The problem was so severe on the Atlantic cable that transmission speeds were measured in minutes per word rather than words per minute. In attempting to overcome this problem with ever higher voltage, Whitehouse permanently damaged the cable insulation and made it unusable. He was dismissed shortly afterwards.

Some commentators overinterpreted the law of squares and concluded that it implied that the "speed of electricity" depends on the length of the cable. Heaviside, with typical sarcasm, in a piece in The Electrician countered this:

Is it possible to conceive that the current, when it first sets out to go, say, to Edinburgh, knows where it's going, how long a journey it has to make, and where it has to stop, so that it can adjust its speed accordingly? Of course not...

— Oliver Heaviside, 1887

== Explanation ==
Both the law of squares and the differential retardation associated with it can be explained with reference to dispersion. This is the phenomenon whereby different frequency components of the telegraph pulse travel down the cable at different speeds depending on the cable materials and geometry. This kind of analysis, using the frequency domain with Fourier analysis rather than the time domain, was unknown to telegraph engineers of the period. They would likely deny that a regular chain of pulses contained more than one frequency. On a line dominated by resistance and capacitance, such as the low-frequency ones analysed by Thomson, the square of the velocity, $u$, of a wave frequency component is proportional to its angular frequency, $\omega$ such that,

$$u^2 = \frac {2 \omega}{CR}.$$

See Primary line constants § Twisted pair and Primary line constants § Velocity for the derivation of this.

From this it can be seen that the higher frequency components travel faster, progressively stretching out the pulse. As the higher frequency components "run away" from the main pulse, the remaining low-frequency components, which contain most of the energy, are left progressively travelling slower as a group.

== Bibliography ==
- Connor, F.R., Wave Transmission, Edward Arnold, 1972 ISBN 0713132787.
- Hunt, Bruce J., The Maxwellians, Cornell University Press, 2005 ISBN 0801482348.
- Lindley, David, Degrees Kelvin: A Tale of Genius, Invention, and Tragedy, Joseph Henry Press, 2004 ISBN 0309167825.
- Lundheim, L., "On Shannon and Shannon's formula", Telektronikk, vol. 98, no. 1, pp. 20–29, 2002.
- Nahin, Paul J., Oliver Heaviside: The Life, Work, and Times of an Electrical Genius of the Victorian Age, Johns Hopkins University Press, 2002 ISBN 0801869099.
- Nahin, Paul J., Transients for Electrical Engineers: Elementary Switched-Circuit Analysis in the Time and Laplace Transform Domains (with a touch of MATLAB), Springer International Publishing, 2018, ISBN 9783319775982.
- Ruddock, I.S., "Lord Kelvin", ch. 1 in, Collins, M.W.; Dougal, R.C.; Koenig, C.s.; Ruddock, I.S. (eds), Kelvin, Thermodynamics and the Natural World, WIT Press, 2015 ISBN 1845641493.
- Schiffer, Michael B., Power Struggles: Scientific Authority and the Creation of Practical Electricity Before Edison, MIT Press, 2008 ISBN 9780262195829.
- Tagg, Christopher, "Soliton theory in optical communication", pp. 87–88 in, Annual Review of Broadband Communications, International Engineering Consortium, 2005 ISBN 1931695385.
