= Charles Tilston Bright =

British engineer (1832–1888)

Sir Charles Tilston Bright
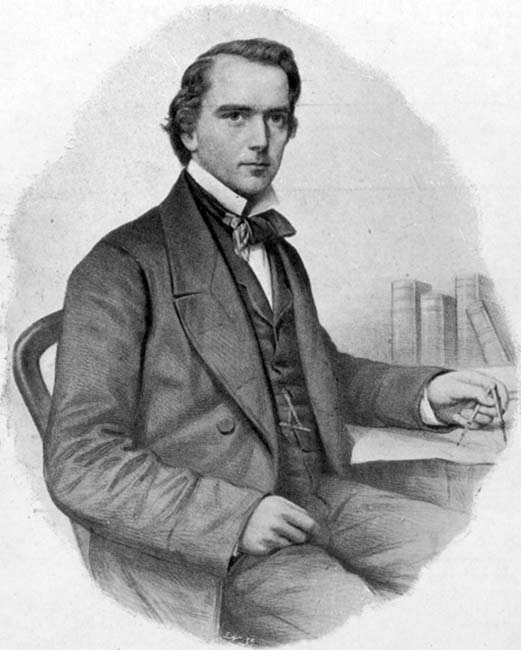
- Bright, c. 1858
- Born: 8 June 1832; Wanstead, Essex, England
- Died: 3 May 1888 (aged 55); Abbey Wood
- Occupation: Electrical engineer
- Known for: Transatlantic telegraph cable

Sir Charles Tilston Bright (8 June 1832 – 3 May 1888) was an English electrical engineer who oversaw the laying of the first transatlantic telegraph cable in 1858, for which work he was knighted.

== Life ==
Born on 8 June 1832 in Wanstead, Essex, Bright was educated at Merchant Taylors' School.

At fifteen, he became a clerk for the Electric Telegraph Company and as his talent for electrical engineering became evident, he was appointed engineer to the Magnetic Telegraph Company in 1852. In that role he supervised the laying of lines in the British Isles, including in 1853 the first cable between Scotland and Ireland, from Portpatrick to Donaghadee, when he was just 21. This work, and the successful laying of other submarine cables, suggested to others that it might be possible to lay a cable across the Atlantic from Ireland to North America.

Joining with Cyrus West Field and John Watkins Brett, who controlled the New York, Newfoundland and London Telegraph Company, Bright helped organise the Atlantic Telegraph Company in 1856 to develop a transatlantic cable, with himself as engineer-in-chief; Wildman Whitehouse soon joined them as chief electrician. Samuel Canning supported the effort on board HMS Agamemnon.

After two failed attempts in August 1857 and three more in June 1858, Bright successfully accomplished what to many had seemed an impossible feat, completing the first Atlantic cable from Trinity Bay, Newfoundland, to Valentia Island, Ireland, on 5 August 1858. Bright was knighted in Dublin just a few days later. Though widely hailed as the wonder of the age, the 1858 cable failed after only about a month of fitful service, a victim of hasty manufacture and the excessive signalling voltages used by Whitehouse. Sir Charles Bright emerged from the debacle with his reputation largely intact and went on to supervise the laying of successful cables in the Mediterranean, the Persian Gulf, and the Caribbean. He also served as a consultant on renewed efforts to span the Atlantic, which in 1866 resulted not only in the completion of the first lasting transatlantic cable, but in the recovery and completion of a cable that had snapped during laying in 1865.

Bright formed a partnership with Josiah Latimer Clark in 1861 and together they introduced numerous improvements in the manufacture, testing, and operation of submarine cables. They were strong advocates of establishing a unified system of electrical units, and a number of the proposals they made in a paper presented to the British Association for the Advancement of Science in 1861 were later taken up by the British Association Committee on Electrical Standards and formed the foundations of the system of ohms, amps, and volts still in use today. In 1865 he was awarded a Telford Medal for a paper on the possibilities of submarine cable telegraphy from England to China and Australia.

In 1870, Bright was contracted to be the engineer for the Panama and South Pacific Telegraph Company, which was planning to lay a submarine cable between Panama and Peru. However, this engagement ended in controversy when the company discovered that, at the same time as Bright was acting as engineer for the company, he had also agreed to be the sub-contractor for the Telegraph Works Company, which the Panama (etc.) Company had engaged to carry out the work of laying the cable. This ended in a court case between the Panama (etc.) Company and Telegraph Works Company, which was heard in the Divisional Court on 27 April 1875, and which gave judgment for the Panama (etc.) Company on the basis that Bright's dual engagement had given rise to an improper conflict of interest that was tantamount to fraud. That case is now a leading judicial authority in English law on third party liability for procuring a breach of duty by an agent.

From 1865 to 1868, Bright was Liberal MP for Greenwich and in 1887 he was elected president of the Society of Telegraph Engineers and Electricians (later the Institution of Electrical Engineers). Bright died on 3 May 1888, at Abbey Wood, near London. His son Charles Bright was also a noted cable engineer and historian of the subject.

Bright's funeral took place at Chiswick Churchyard with a subsequent service at St Cuthbert's, Earls Court. The numerous attendees included Prince Victor of Hohenlohe-Langenburg, Robert Jardine, Frederic John Goldsmid and David Lionel Goldsmid-Stern-Salomons.

== Sir Charles Bright (son) ==
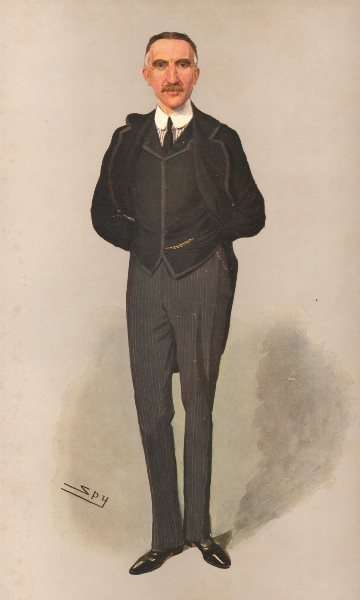
"Submarine Telegraphs", caricature by Spy in Vanity Fair, 1908.

Charles Tilston Bright's son, also Charles Bright (1863-1937), followed in his father's footsteps. In addition to cable engineering he was a pioneer in the use of radio as a communication device on both ships and planes.

He was elected a Fellow of the Royal Society of Edinburgh in 1895, and was knighted in 1919.

== See also ==
- Charles Bright (judge)

== Notes ==
Parliament of the United Kingdom
Preceded by David Salomons; William Angerstein	Member of Parliament for Greenwich; 1865 – 1868; With: David Salomons	Succeeded by David Salomons; William Ewart Gladstone
