= Samuel Canning =

English engineer (1823–1908)

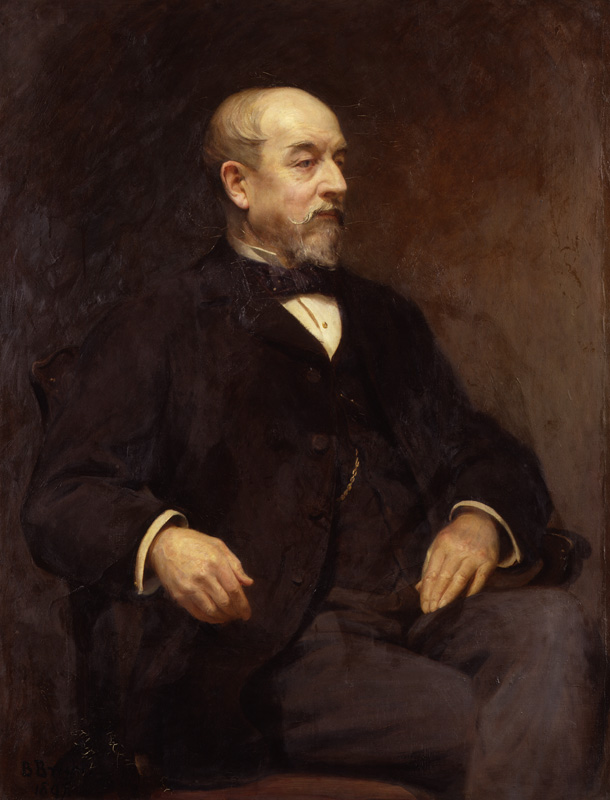
Sir Samuel Canning by Beatrice Bright, 1897

Sir Samuel Canning (21 July 1823 – 24 September 1908) was an English pioneer of submarine telegraphy.

== Life ==
Born at Ogbourne St. Andrew, Wiltshire, on 21 July 1823, he was son of Robert Canning of Ogbourne and his wife Frances Hyde; he was educated at Salisbury.

Canning gained his first engineering experience as assistant to Messrs. Locke & Errington from 1844 to 1849 on the Great Western Railway extensions, and as resident engineer on the Liverpool, Ormskirk and Preston railway.

== Undersea cables ==
In 1852, Canning turned to submarine telegraphy, and with Messrs. Glass & Elliot laid his first cable in 1856: it connected Cape Breton Island with Newfoundland. In 1857 he assisted Charles Bright in the construction and laying of the first Atlantic cable, and he was on board HMS Agamemnon during the submerging of the cable in 1857 and 1858. Following 1865, for the same employers, he laid cables in the deep waters of the Mediterranean and other seas.

When the Telegraph Construction and Maintenance Company was formed in 1865, Canning was appointed its chief engineer. He had charge of the manufacture and laying of the transatlantic telegraph cables of 1865 and 1866, for which the company were the contractors. This work involved the fitting-out of the SS Great Eastern. On 2 August 1865 the cable broke in 2000 fathoms of water. After a second cable had been successfully laid by the Great Eastern (13–27 July 1866) Canning set to work to recover the broken cable, using special grappling machinery, which he devised for the purpose. After several failures the cable was eventually recovered on 2 September 1866.

For these services, Canning was knighted in 1866, and Luís I of Portugal conferred on him the Order of St. Jago d'Espada. In 1869, he laid the French Atlantic cable between Brest and Duxbury, Massachusetts.

== Later life ==
After retiring from the Telegraph Construction Company, Canning practiced as a consulting engineer in matters connected with telegraphy, and, among other work, superintended the laying of the Marseilles-Algiers and other cables for the India Rubber, Gutta Percha and Telegraph Works Company. He acted later as adviser to the West Indian, Panama and other telegraph companies. He was a member of the Institution of Civil Engineers (from 1 February 1876) and the Institution of Electrical Engineers.

Canning died at 1 Inverness Gardens, Kensington, on 24 September 1908, and was buried in Kensal Green cemetery.

== Family ==
Canning married in 1859. His wife, Elizabeth Anne, died in 1909. She was the daughter of W. H. Gale of Grately, Hampshire. The couple had three sons and three daughters.

== Notes ==
Attribution

This article incorporates text from a publication now in the public domain: Lee, Sidney, ed. (1912). "Canning, Samuel". Dictionary of National Biography (2nd supplement). Vol. 1. London: Smith, Elder & Co.
