= Beatrice Bright =

British painter (1861–1940)

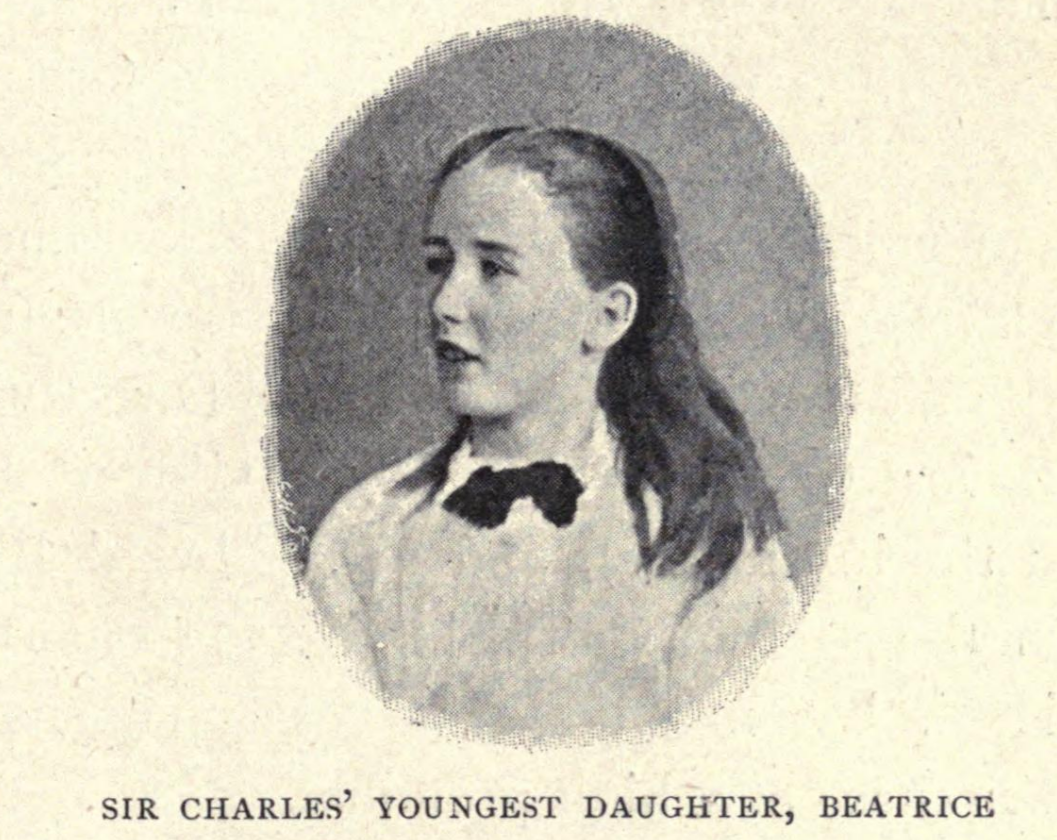
Bright in an 1898 book

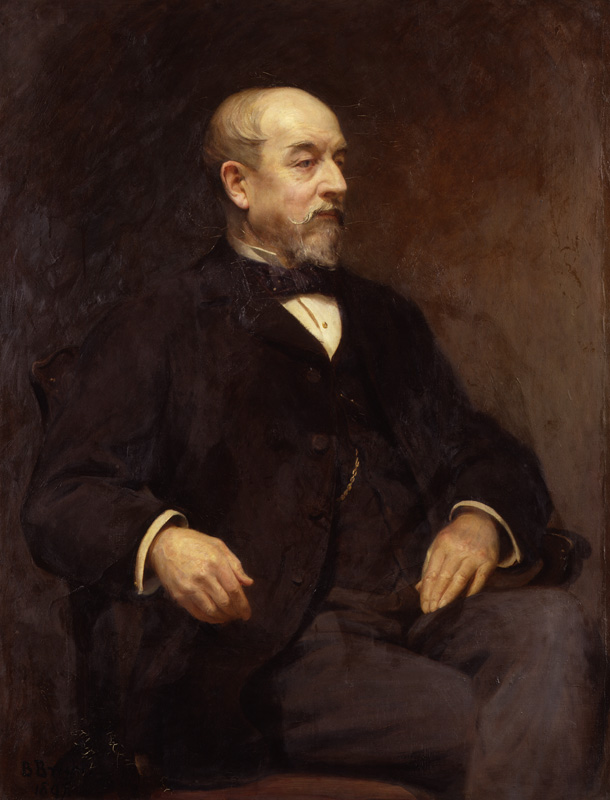
Oil on canvas of Sir Samuel Canning (1897)

Beatrice Bright (1861–1940) was a British portrait and landscape painter.

"Annie" Bright was born in London in 1861, the youngest of three daughters born to telegraph engineer Sir Charles Tilston Bright and his wife Hannah Barrick (née Taylor). An ambrotype c. 1862 held by the National Portrait Gallery possibly features the infant Bright. She was educated privately and encouraged by both parents to pursue art. In fact, her father was a dabbling sketch-artist himself. He also named a cable-laying ship Beatrice that was later used for excursions.

Bright studied under the painter Sir Arthur Stockdale Cope and went on sketching tours of Europe. She first exhibited her work there in the late 1880s before returning to London, with a studio at Hanover Square and a residence in Kensington. From 1896, she was an Associate of the Society of Lady Artists and exhibited 23 paintings at the Royal Academy of Arts over the next thirty years. She ultimately exhibited works across Great Britain, and "often" at the Salon des Artistes Français, receiving an honourable mention at the latter in 1927.

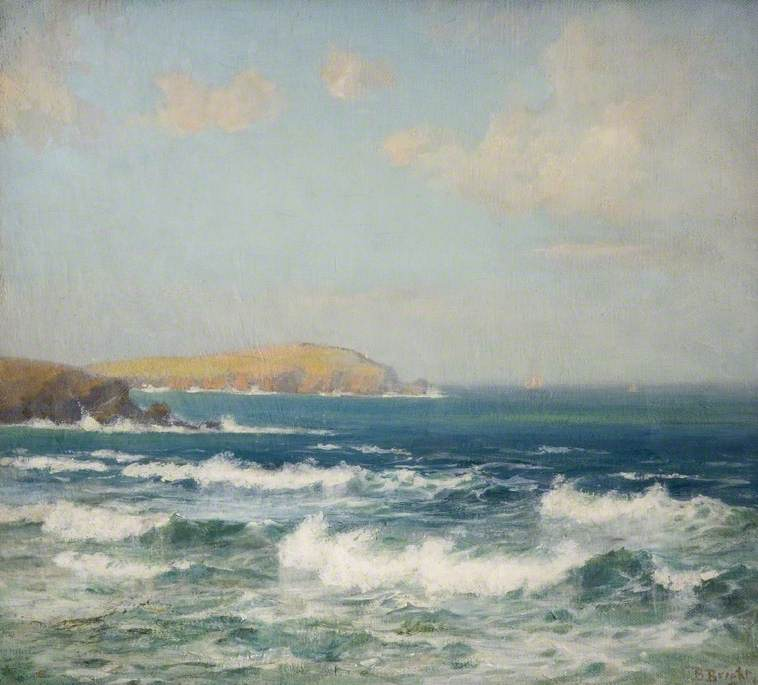
Trevose Head, Cornwall (c. 1930s)

"Well-known" for her portraits, Bright also painted flowers and seascapes, spending part of 1909 to 1914 in St Ives, Cornwall with Albert Julius Olsson for that purpose.

There is no reference in reference guides to a husband or children and Bright is referred to as "Miss". She died in 1940, leaving over £33,000. As of April 2026, Art UK lists ten venues in England and Wales that display her work. They have also sold for auction, including two paintings of Cornwall by Christie's in 2004 that fetched £358 together.
