= Telegraph Plateau =

Archaic term for region of the Atlantic Ocean

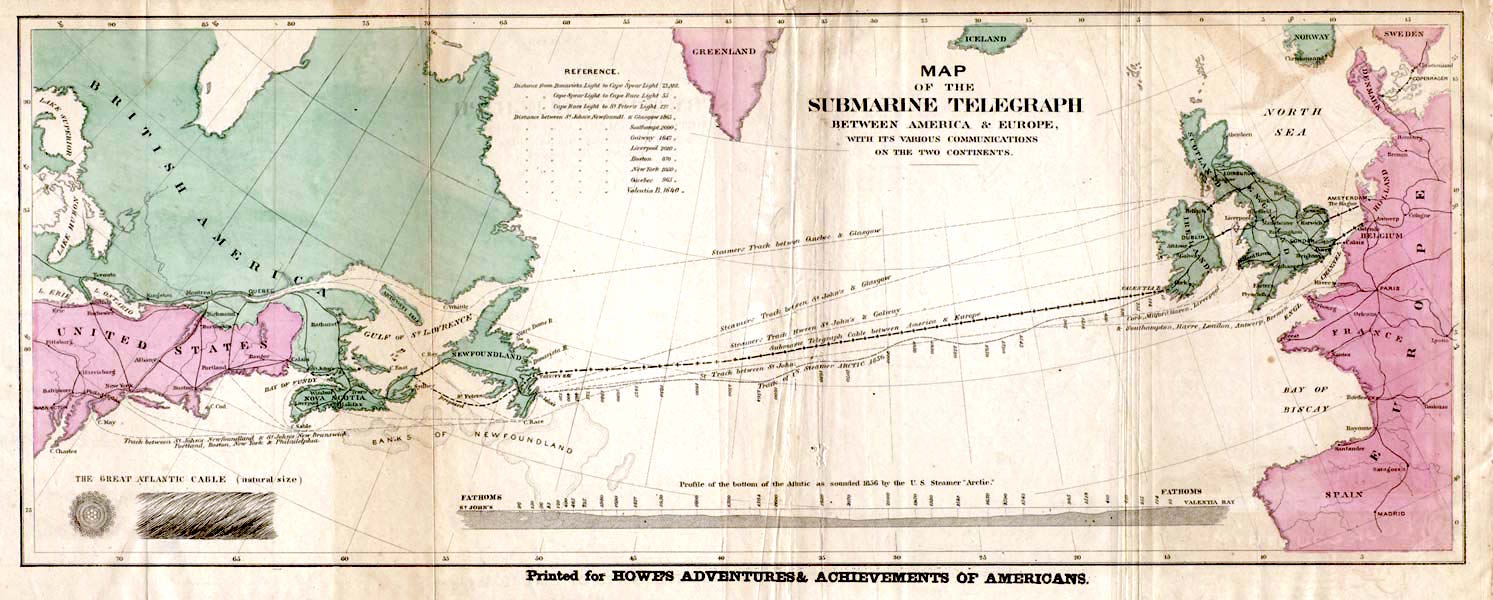
Map showing the route of the 1858 transatlantic cable, including a profile of depth soundings taken by USS Arctic

The Telegraph Plateau is a region of the North Atlantic that was supposedly relatively flat and shallow compared to the rest of the ocean away from shore. The term is archaic and no longer used by hydrographers. It was so named because it seemed to be an ideal route for a transatlantic telegraph cable, and was actually used for the first such cable in 1858. The Victorian hydrographers surveying the route failed to notice the Mid-Atlantic Ridge in the middle of the route.

== Discovery and naming ==
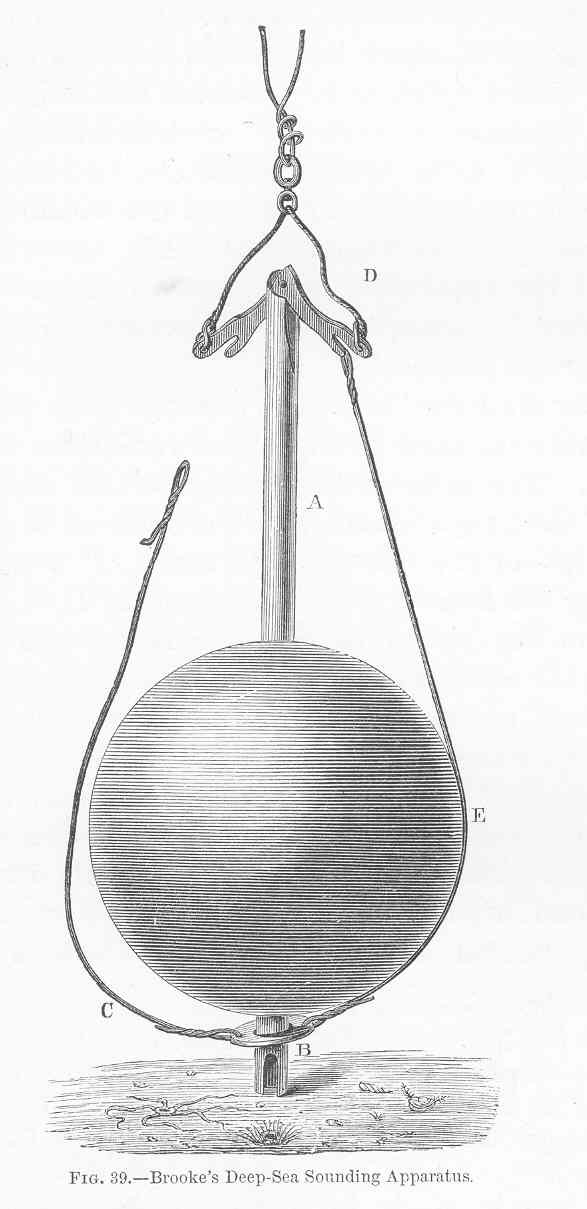
Brooke's deep-sea sounding and core-sampling device

The feature was discovered by Matthew Fontaine Maury while producing a bathymetric chart of the ocean in 1853, compiled from sounding data from multiple ships' logs. Maury so named it because he thought it would be an ideal route for a transatlantic telegraph cable, which at the time, was no more than a vague aspiration. His hydrographers confirmed his assessment of the viability of the route using accurate sounders invented by John Mercer Brooke. Brooke's sounder was designed to release the lead immediately it contacted the bottom so that a sample of the sea bed could be recovered without the risk of the line breaking while it was being hauled back up due to the weight of the lead. Maury had discarded many of the historic readings because he thought they were inaccurate due to the inability of the sounder to tell when the lead had contacted the bottom in deep ocean. This resulted in more line being run out before the reading was taken. Maury's solution to this problem was to determine the law of descent of the line for given sizes of line and weights of lead. Sounders were provided with tables of expected rates of line runout, so that once the rate was much less than that expected, they knew that the bottom had been reached.

The feature occupied the shortest route between the British Isles and the Americas. The region begins at around 51° north and runs from near the south of Ireland to Newfoundland in Canada north of the Great Banks for a distance of 1,400 miles (2,300 km). Its average depth was measured at 1,400 fathoms (2,600 m), and greatest depth 2,500 fathoms (4,600 m). It was described as a table-land or steppe (in comparison to the Southern Andean Steppe), and sometimes called the Atlantic steppe. To the south of the plateau, the hydrography was determined to be very uneven, with depths of between 4 and 6 miles (6,400 and 9,700 m) recorded, although six miles is a little beyond any depth marked on a modern chart.

Maury's chart was instrumental in Cyrus Field's decision to land the transatlantic cable in Newfoundland. It showed that the region to the south of Telegraph Plateau was much too rugged to take a cable directly to the United States. The route had appeal, not only because it was flat, not too deep, and was the shortest route, but also because it had moderate currents which would help the cable to sink straight down and a soft seabed (made up of microscopic shells) for the cable to rest on.

The Victorian hydrographers failed to detect the presence of the Mid-Atlantic Ridge due to the widely spaced soundings taken along the proposed cable route. The ridge is particularly narrow at this point and the hydrography on either side is relatively flat. The term Telegraph Plateau is no longer used by modern hydrographers.

== Geology ==
Telegraph Plateau consists of oceanic crust plus a section of the Reykjanes Ridge (the northern branch of the Mid-Atlantic Ridge) where the plateau crosses from the Eurasian plate to the North American plate. The crossing is in the Charlie-Gibbs fracture zone between the Minia Seamount Mountains to the north and the volcanic Faraday Hills to the south. Telegraph Plateau was once thought to be an ancient shield resembling Greenland with a different strike, and the fold belts around it suggested Caledonian folding. These features are now known to be much more recent and are a result of plate tectonics.

== Bibliography ==
- Barnes, Clifford A.; Broadus, James M.; Ericson, David Barnard; Fleming, Richard Howell; LaMourie, Matthew J.; Namias, Jerome, "Atlantic Ocean", Encyclopædia Britannica (online), Encyclopædia Britannica, Inc., retrieved 26 May 2020.
- Kevin P. Furlong, Steven D. Sheaffer, Rocco Malservisi, "Thermal–rheological controls of deformation within ocean transforms", pp. 65–84 in, The Nature and Tectonic Significance of Fault Zone Weakening, Geological Society of London, 2001 ISBN 1862390908.
- John Mullaly, The Laying of the Cable, or the Ocean Telegraph, D. Appleton, 1858, LCCN 08-3682.
- Helen M. Rozwadowski, Fathoming the Ocean: The Discovery and Exploration of the Deep Sea, Harvard University Press, 2009 ISBN 0674042948.
- Jacob Ward, "Oceanscapes and spacescapes in North Atlantic communications: Laying cables", ch. 10 in, Jon Agar, Jacob Ward (eds), Robert E. Holdsworth, R. A. Strachan, J. Magloughlin, R. J. Knipe (eds), Histories of Technology, the Environment and Modern Britain, UCL Press, retrieved 8 May 2020.
