= New York, Newfoundland and London Telegraph Company =

Telegraph company

New York, Newfoundland & London Telegraph Company
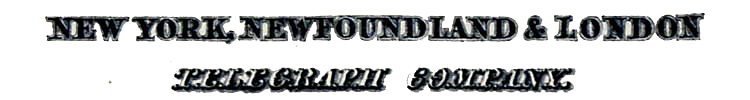
- Company type: Private
- Industry: Communication
- Founded: 1852
- Founder: Cyrus Field
- Revenue: Not reported

The New York, Newfoundland & London Telegraph Company was a company in a series of conglomerations of several companies that eventually laid the first Trans-Atlantic cable.

In 1854 British engineer Charles Bright met an American, Cyrus Field, who had been shared a dream by Frederic Gisborne, of completing a submarine cable connection between North America and Europe. The New York, Newfoundland and London Telegraph Company was founded in 1852 and in 1854 Charles Bright and John Watkins Brett became additional signatories along with Cyrus Field. This was to make sure that Britain had a representative on the company's board and so enable support for a trans-Atlantic cable from the British. In 1855 Charles Bright finished a survey of the Irish coast and came to the conclusion that Valentia Island, on the west coast of Ireland, was best possible location and was also the closest point to North America. Armed with this location and the information that Cyrus Field gathered from a US Navy oceanographic seabed survey, that had taken place the year before, the project got underway.
