= Wildman Whitehouse =

English surgeon and electrical engineer (1816–1890)

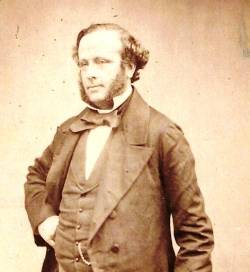
- Born: Edward Orange Wildman Whitehouse; October 1, 1816; Liverpool, England
- Died: January 26, 1890 (aged 73)
- Resting place: Hove Cemetery, England

Edward Orange Wildman Whitehouse (1 October 1816 – 26 January 1890) was an English surgeon by profession and an electrical experimenter by avocation. He was recruited by entrepreneur Cyrus West Field as Chief Electrician to work on the pioneering endeavour to lay the first transatlantic telegraph cable for the Atlantic Telegraph Company between western Ireland to eastern Newfoundland. This pioneering project of the Victorian era began in 1854 and was completed in 1858; however, the cable functioned for only three weeks. While Whitehouse sent the first telegraph communications on 16 August 1858 to the United States of America, he was ultimately held responsible for the undersea cable failure after he applied higher voltages in an effort to boost declining signals.

== Life ==
Born in Liverpool to a merchant, he qualified as a member of the Royal College of Surgeons in 1840 and established a successful practice in Brighton.

== First transatlantic cable ==
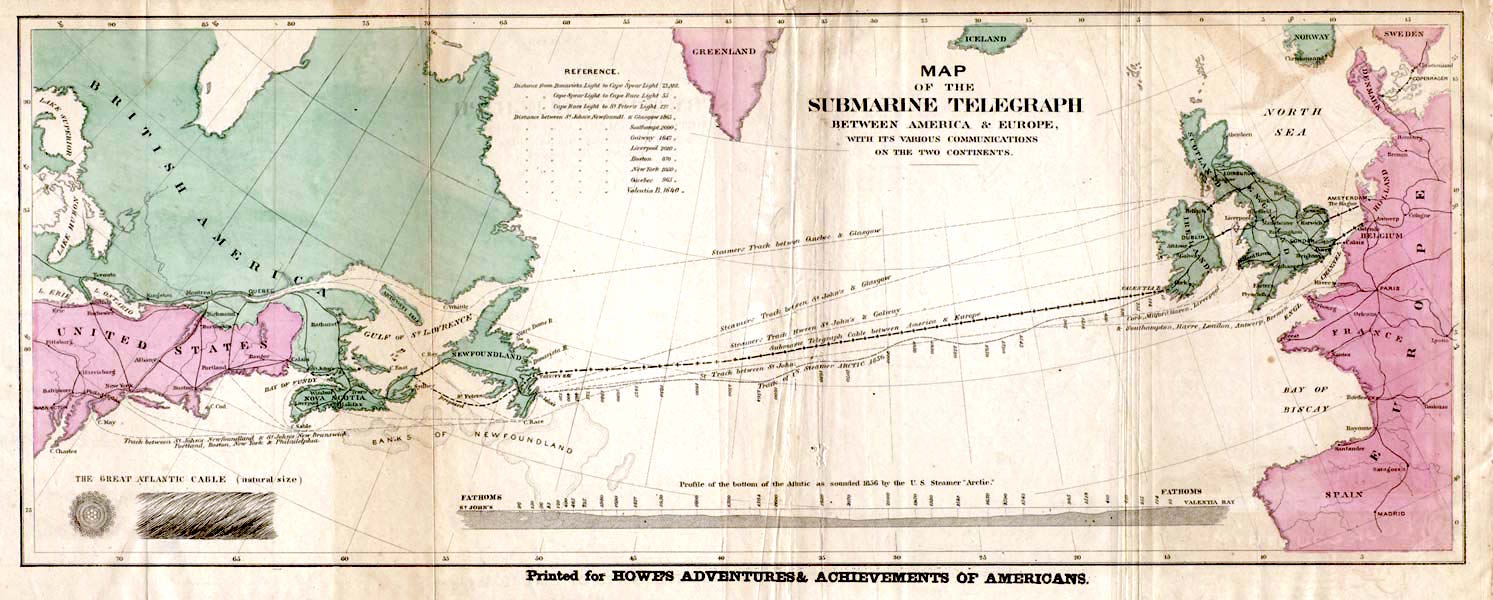
Transatlantic cable route, 1858

In the 1850s, Whitehouse conducted experiments that, he held, showed that feared problems with practical data rates on underwater cables would not prohibit a commercial service. Though his claims were disputed by William Thomson (Lord Kelvin), he was an able propagandist for the proponents of a proposed transatlantic cable. Cyrus West Field recruited Whitehouse as chief electrician to the Atlantic Telegraph Company; Thomson subsequently became scientific advisor, convinced that Whitehouse's theories were wrong but believing him to have the practical skill to make the scheme work. When the cable finally opened for business, it was beset with the problems that Thomson had foreseen.

Whitehouse's inadequate apparatus had to be replaced by Thomson's more sensitive mirror galvanometer but Whitehouse then ruined the cable by delivering massive shocks of an estimated 10,000 to 15,000 volts via induction coils in an attempt to rectify the problems. Whitehouse continually maintained that the cable and his equipment were a success. Though he put up a desperate public defence of his conduct and was more than ready to apportion blame among all other parties, an 1861 enquiry concluded that he should bear the majority of the responsibility. It has been argued that the manufacture, storage and handling of the 1858 cable would have led to premature failure in any case.

Whitehouse was a Fellow of the Royal College of Surgeons, Licentiate of the Society of Apothecaries, Fellow of the Royal Astronomical Society, Associate of the Institution of Civil Engineers, founding member of the Society of Telegraphic Engineers, and a member of the Royal Institution, the Royal Meteorological Society, the Physical Society, and the British Association for the Advancement of Science.

== Sources ==
- de Cogan, D. (1985). "Dr E.O.W. Whitehouse and the 1858 transatlantic cable". History of Technology. 10: 1–15.
- Hunt, Bruce (23 September 2004). "Whitehouse, (Edward Orange) Wildman (1816–1890), surgeon and electrician". Oxford Dictionary of National Biography.
