= Frederic Newton Gisborne =

British-Canadian inventor and electrician

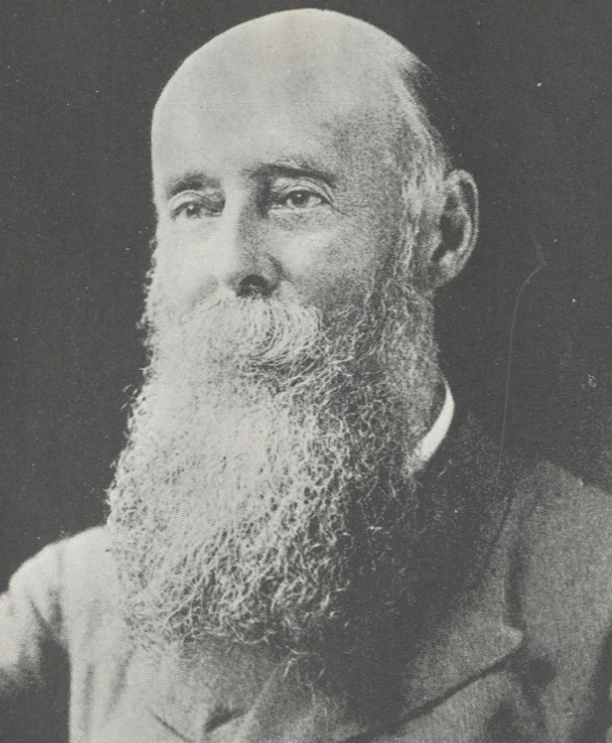
- Born: 8 March 1824; Broughton, Lancashire, England, U.K.
- Died: 30 August 1892 (aged 68); Ottawa, Ontario, Canada
- Occupations: Farmer, telegraph agent, civil servant, engineer, and inventor

Frederic Newton Gisborne (8 March 1824 – 30 August 1892) was a British inventor and electrician.

Born in Broughton, England, he left England in 1842 for a trip around the world, finally settling in Canada in 1845. By close study he became an expert electrician, and original improvements in methods and instruments soon attracted so much attention that he was appointed superintendent of the lines of the Nova Scotia government at Halifax.

After studying the problems of ocean telegraphy, he laid the first deep-sea cable in North American waters, between Prince Edward Island and New Brunswick in 1852. In 1853, he went to New York City, where in 1854 he became associated with Cyrus W. Field. On the organization of the New York, Newfoundland, and London Telegraph Company, he was appointed the chief engineer. The new company intended to lay the first deep-sea telegraph cable between Europe and North America.

In 1879, Gisborne was appointed superintendent of the Canadian government telegraph service, which position he held until his death. Among his numerous inventions were an anti-induction ocean cable, electric and pneumatic ship signals, an anticorrosive composition for the bottoms of iron ships, and an electric recording target.
