= Cyrus W. Field =

American businessman (1819–1892)

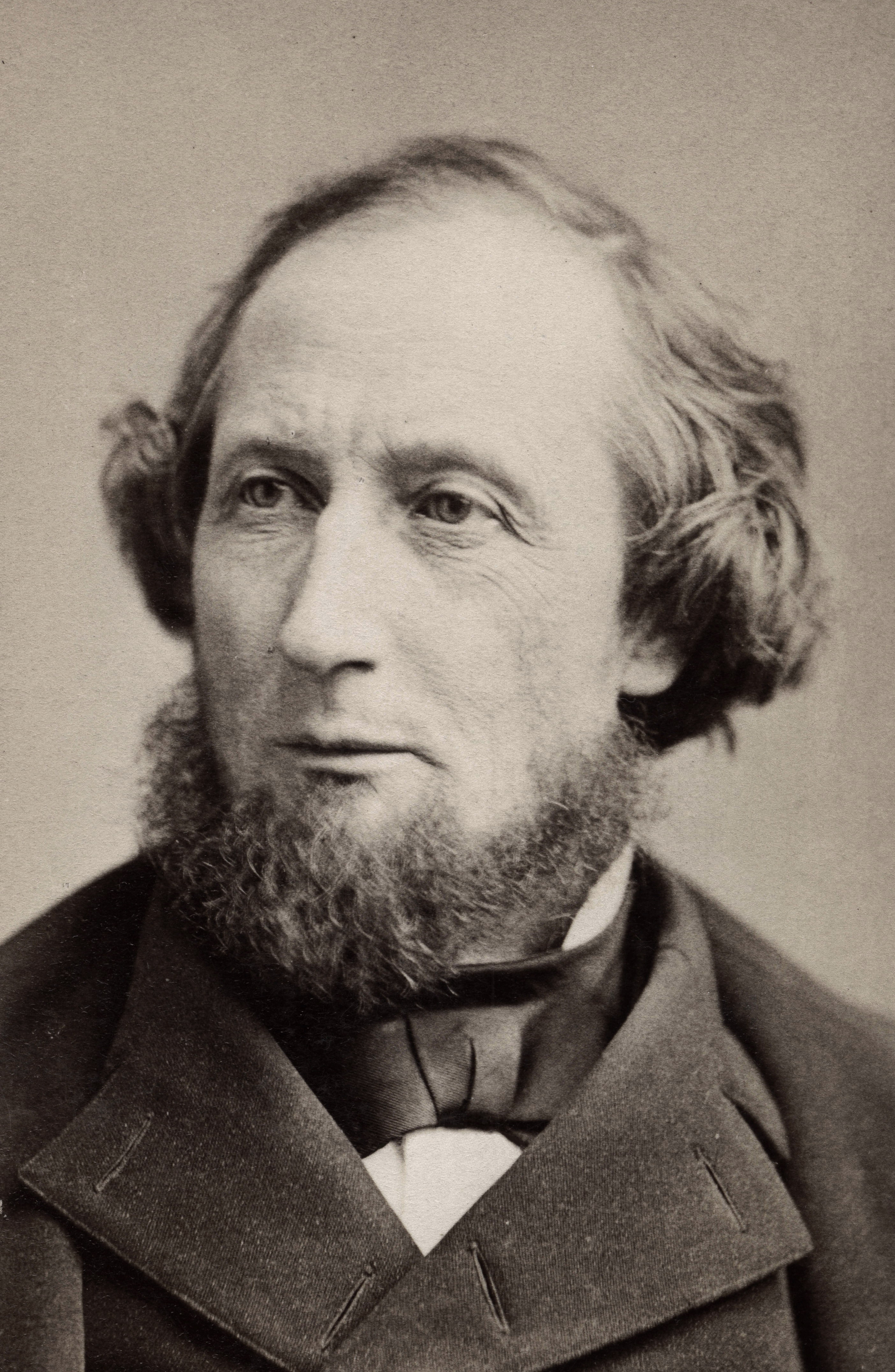
- Field c. 1870
- Born: Cyrus West Field; November 30, 1819; Stockbridge, Massachusetts, U.S.
- Died: July 12, 1892 (aged 72); Irvington, New York, U.S.
- Occupations: Businessman, financier, telecommunications pioneer
- Spouse: Mary Bryan Stone (m. 1840)
- Children: 7
- Father: David Dudley Field I
- Relatives: Frederick Vanderbilt Field (descendant)

Cyrus West Field (November 30, 1819 – July 12, 1892) was an American businessman and financier who, along with other entrepreneurs, created the Atlantic Telegraph Company and laid the first telegraph cable across the Atlantic Ocean in 1858.

== Early life ==
Field was born in Stockbridge, Massachusetts to Rev. David Dudley Field, a Congregational clergyman, and Submit Dickinson Field, daughter of Revolutionary War Captain Noah Dickinson from Somers, Connecticut. The eighth of ten children, he was the brother of David Dudley Field Jr., Henry Martyn Field, and Stephen Johnson Field, the 38th United States Supreme Court Justice, among other siblings. When he was 15 years old, Field came to New York City, where he was hired as an errand boy in the A.T. Stewart & Co., a dry goods merchant firm. He entered a business apprenticeship, and earned fifty dollars at his first year as a storeroom clerk; his pay was doubled the following year. After three years, he came back to Stockbridge, but returned to New York later in his career. Field married Mary Bryan Stone on December 2, 1840, two days after he turned twenty one, and they had seven children.

== Getting started in business ==
Although Field had many available career options, he chose business. This was a great move for Field. At first, he worked for his brothers, David Dudley Field Jr. and Matthew Dickinson Field. In 1838, he accepted an offer from his brother Matthew to become his assistant in the paper manufacturing venture, the Columbia Mill, in Lee, Massachusetts. In Spring 1840, he went into business by himself, manufacturing paper in Westfield, Massachusetts. The same year, he became a junior partner in the E. Root & Co., a wholesale paper firm based in New York with responsibilities to oversee clients and conduct sales away from New York. After six months, E. Root & Co. failed leaving large debts. Field negotiated with creditors, dissolved the old firm, and started a new partnership with his brother-in-law, Joseph F. Stone, registered as Cyrus W. Field & Co. He stayed in business and was furnishing supplies for the Northeast mills, such as owned by Crane & Company, and buying the finished product wholesale. Through his hard work and long hours, the young paper merchant was able to repay the settled debts and succeed in business by servicing the burgeoning penny press and the need for stocks and bonds, becoming eventually one of the richest men in New York. In March, 1853, he repaid all previously cancelled debt due to insolvency of E. Root & Co. debts in full amount with interest, being under no legal obligation to do so. Among the answers received, one particularly stated,

Your only inheritance was a load of debt, cast upon you at the commencement of your business life, which was not caused by lack of foresight or fault on your part. You bore up under this heavy burden and paid it as not one in thousands could or would have done, and by this very act you laid broad the basis of your subsequent success.

== Midlife ==
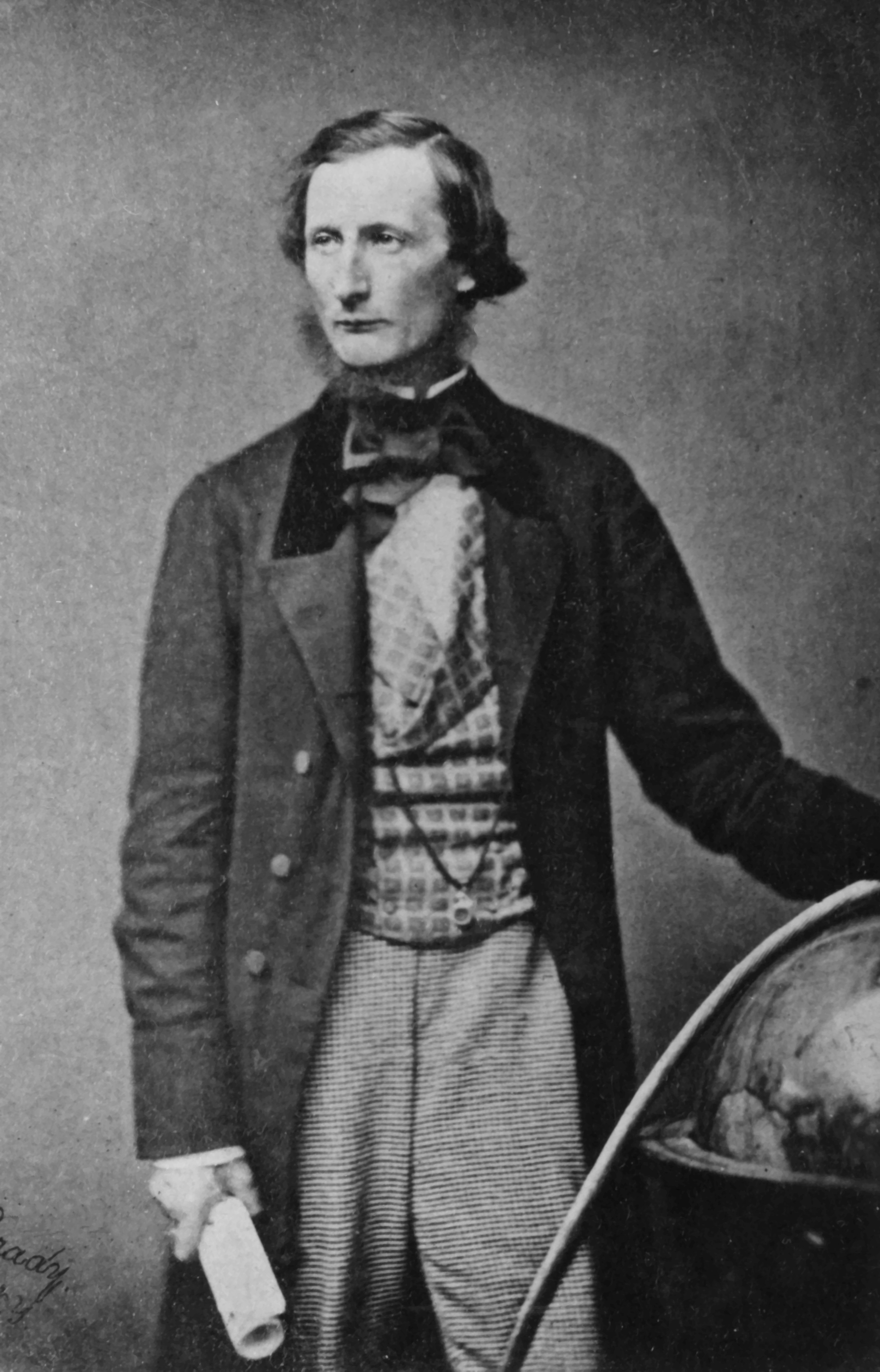
Cyrus Field, c. 1860

Business earnings permitted Field to partially retire at the age of 34 with a fortune of $250,000 (equal to $8,958,333 today) and build a home in Gramercy Park. In 1853, Field financed an expedition to South America with his artist friend Frederic Edwin Church, during which they explored present-day Ecuador, Colombia, and Panama. They followed the route taken by Alexander von Humboldt over 50 years earlier. Church's sketches of the landscapes and volcanoes on this trip, and on a subsequent trip in 1857 with artist Louis Rémy Mignot, inspired some of his most famous paintings upon his return to New York. Field's list of "Places of Interest to Visit" in South America reflected his interests, including business interests: bridges, volcanoes, waterfalls, and cities, as well as gold mines and the emerald mines of Muzo.

Field turned his attention to telegraphy after he was contacted in January 1854 by Frederic Newton Gisborne, a British engineer, who aimed to establish a telegraph connection between St. John's, Newfoundland and New York City, started the work, but failed due to the lack of capital. Later that year he, with Peter Cooper, Abram Stevens Hewitt, Moses Taylor and Samuel F.B. Morse, joined the so-called Cable Cabinet of entrepreneurs, investors and engineers. Through this Cable Cabinet, Field became instrumental in laying a 400-mile (640 km) telegraph line connecting St. John's, Newfoundland with Nova Scotia, coupling with telegraph lines from the U.S. American investors took over Gisborne's venture and formed a new company called the New York, Newfoundland, and London Telegraph Company (N.Y.N.L.T.C.) after Field convinced the Cable Cabinet to extend the line from Newfoundland to Ireland .

The next year the same investors formed the American Telegraph Company and began buying up other companies, rationalizing them into a consolidated system that ran from Maine to the Gulf Coast; the system was second only to Western Union's.

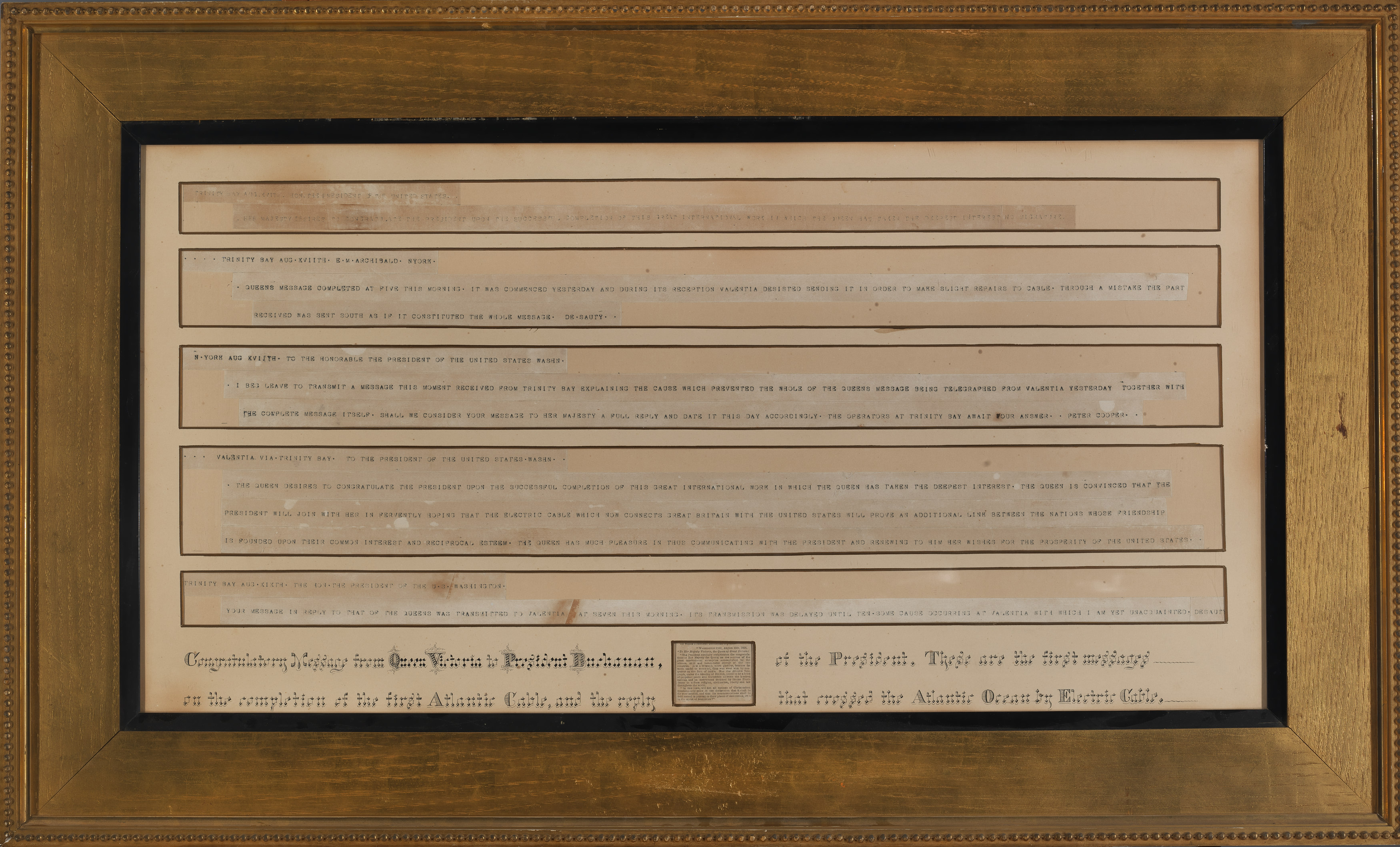
Congratulatory telegram to President Buchanan on the completion of the first Trans-Atlantic cable, 1858.

In 1857, after securing financing in England and backing from the American and British governments, the Atlantic Telegraph Company began laying the first transatlantic telegraph cable, utilizing a shallow submarine plateau that ran between Ireland and Newfoundland. The cable was officially opened on August 16, 1858, when Queen Victoria sent President James Buchanan a message in Morse code. Although the jubilation at the feat was widespread, the cable itself was short-lived: it broke down three weeks afterward, and a working cable was not laid until 1866.

During the Panic of 1857, Field's paper business suspended, and Peter Cooper, his neighbor in Gramercy Park, was the only one that kept him from going under.

On August 26, 1858, Field returned to a homecoming at Great Barrington, Massachusetts, saluting this Massachusetts boy made good. "This has been a great day here," trumpeted The New York Times, "The occasion was the reception of the welcome of Cyrus W. Field, Esq., the world-renowned parent of the Atlantic Telegraph Cable scheme, which has been so successfully completed."

Field's activities brought him into contact with a number of prominent persons on both sides of the Atlantic – including Lord Clarendon and William Ewart Gladstone, the British Finance Minister at the time. Field's communications with Gladstone would become important in the middle of the American Civil War, when three letters he received from Gladstone between November 27, 1862, and December 9, 1862, caused a furor, because Gladstone appeared to express support of the secessionist southern states in forming the Confederate States of America.

In 1866, Field laid a new, more durable trans-Atlantic cable using Brunel's SS Great Eastern. Great Eastern was, at the time, the largest ocean-going ship in the world. His new cable provided almost instant communication across the Atlantic. On his return to Newfoundland, he grappled the cable he had attempted to lay the previous year and made it into a backup wire to the main cable.

In 1867, Field received a gold medal from the U.S. Congress and the grand prize at the International Exposition in Paris for his work on the transatlantic cable.

== Later years ==
In the 1870s–80s, Field entered into transportation business. He served as president of the New York Elevated Railroad Company in 1877–1880 and collaborated with Jay Gould on developing the Wabash Railroad. Field also loaned Henry W. Grady the $20,000 used for Grady to buy a one-quarter interest in the Atlanta Constitution newspaper. He also owned the Mail and Express, a New York newspaper. Bad investments deprived Field of his fortune. He lived modestly during the last five years of his life in his native Stockbridge, Massachusetts, and died in 1892 at the age of 72.

== Commemoration ==
Field and his wife are buried in Stockbridge, Massachusetts in the Stockbridge Cemetery in Berkshire County. His headstone reads: "CYRUS WEST FIELD To whose courage, energy and perseverance the world owes The Atlantic Telegraph."

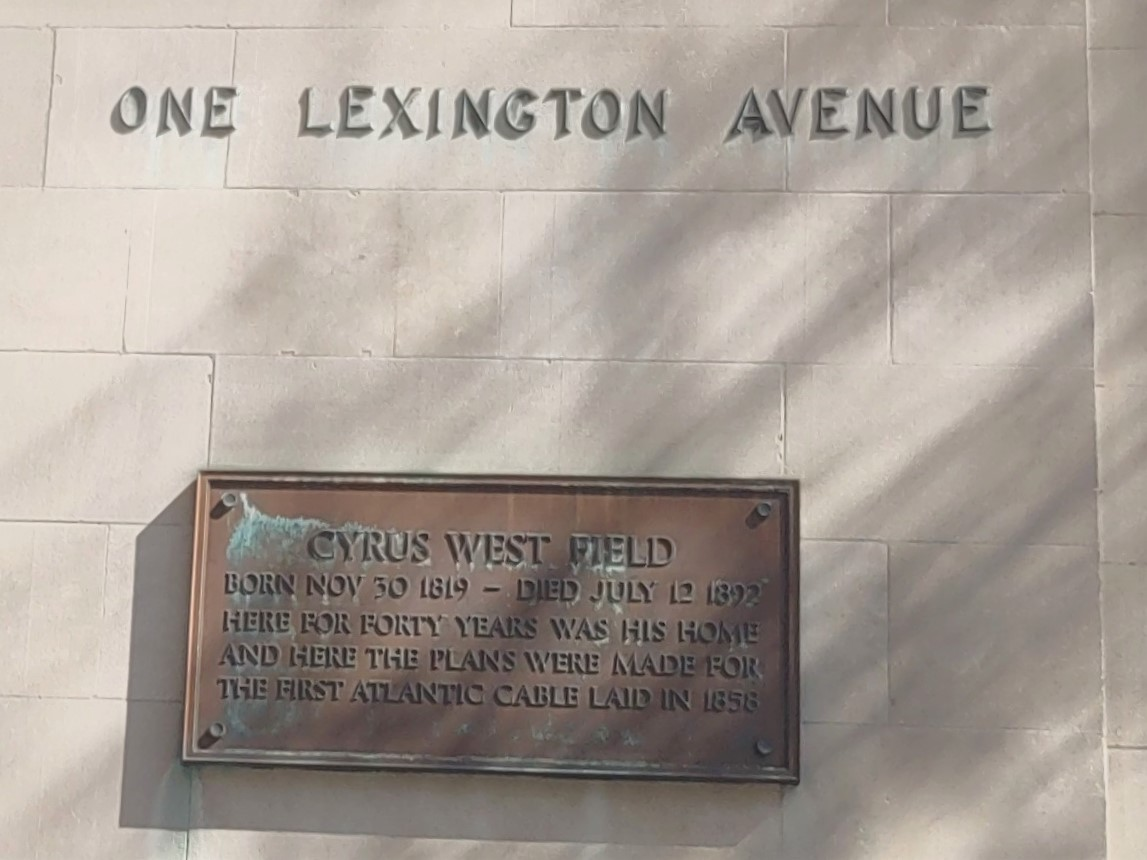
Plaque on a later building on the spot where Cyrus Field lived and worked

In December 1884, the Canadian Pacific Railway named the community of Field, British Columbia, Canada in his honor.

Cyrus Field Road, in Irvington, New York, where he died, is named after him.

Fieldia, the burrowing Cambrian worm, is named after Field.

Ardsley, New York was named after Field's ancestor, Zechariah Field, on Cyrus Field's request. Zechariah Field was born in East Ardsley, West Riding of Yorkshire, England, and immigrated to America in 1629.
