= John Watkins Brett =

Submarine cable telegraphy pioneer

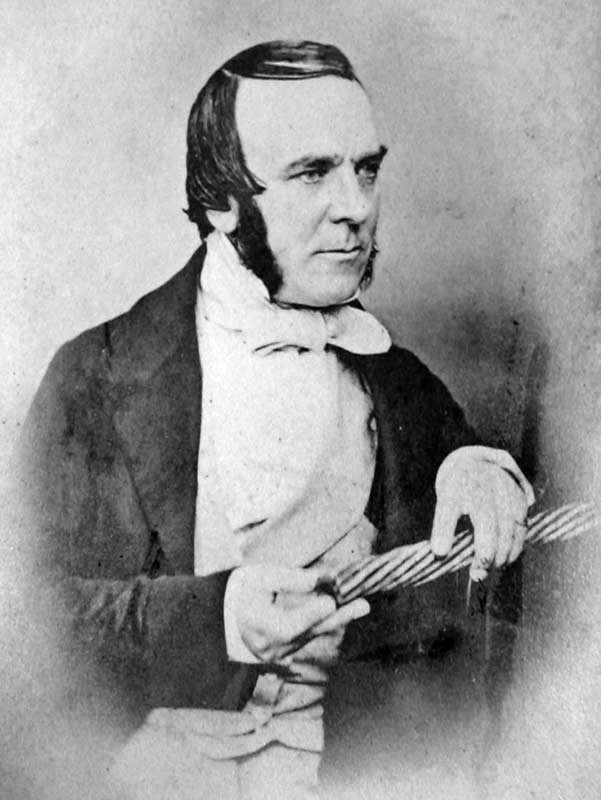

John Watkins Brett (1805–1863) was an English telegraph engineer.

== Life ==
Brett was the son of a cabinetmaker, William Brett of Bristol, and was born in that city in 1805. Brett is known as the founder of submarine telegraphy. He formed the Submarine Telegraph Company in conjunction with his younger brother, Jacob Brett. After some years spent perfecting his plans, he sought and obtained permission from Louis-Philippe in 1847 to establish telegraphic communication between France and England, but the project was deemed too hazardous for general support. However, he was successful in connecting the two nations briefly by undersea cable in 1850. A more durable cable was laid in 1851, and the construction of numerous other submarine lines followed. Brett founded the English and Irish Magnetic Telegraph Company in 1850 which laid the first submarine telegraph cable to Ireland. He was involved in the transatlantic telegraph cable project and was confident that England and America would be linked, but he did not live to see it accomplished.

Brett died on 3 December 1863 at the age of 58, and was buried in the family vault in the churchyard of Westbury-on-Trym, near Bristol.

== Works ==
Brett published a work of 104 pages, On the Origin and Progress of the Oceanic Telegraph, with a few brief facts and opinions of the press (London, 1858), and contributed several papers on the same subject to the Institution of Civil Engineers, of which he was a member. A list of these contributions can be found in the index of the 'Proceedings' of the society.
