= Submarine Cable Act of 1888 =

U.S. legislation protecting submarine cable

- Long title: An Act to carry into effect the International Convention of the fourteenth of March, eighteen hundred and eighty-four, for the protection of submarine cables.
- Nicknames: Protection of Submarine Cable Act of 1888
- Enacted by: the 50th United States Congress
- Effective: February 29, 1888

Citations
- Public law: Pub. L. 50–17
- Statutes at Large: 25 Stat. 41

Codification
- Titles amended: 47 U.S.C.: Telegraphy
- U.S.C. sections created: 47 U.S.C. ch. 2 § 1 et seq.

Legislative history
- Signed into law by President Grover Cleveland on February 29, 1888

Submarine Cable Act of 1888 is a United States federal statute defining penalties for intentional and unintentional disturbances of submarine communications cable in international waters. The Act of Congress acknowledge the Convention for the Protection of Submarine Telegraph Cable of 1884 necessitating the international cooperation for the safeguard of the international communication cables placed on the ocean floor.

The legislation was passed by the 50th United States Congressional session and confirmed as a federal law by the 24th President of the United States Grover Cleveland on February 29, 1888.

== Provisions of the Act ==
The 1888 Act was penned as thirteen sections establishing rulings for the protection of oceanic basin telegraph cables.

47 U.S.C. § 1 ~ Punishment for injuries intentionally done
47 U.S.C. § 2 ~ Penalty for culpable negligence
47 U.S.C. § 3 ~ Saving life
47 U.S.C. § 4 ~ Observance of cable ships & signals
47 U.S.C. § 5 ~ Fishing vessels
47 U.S.C. § 6 ~ Officers authorized
47 U.S.C. § 7 ~ Penalties for refusing to show papers
47 U.S.C. § 8 ~ Suits for damages
47 U.S.C. § 9 ~ Liability of master
47 U.S.C. § 10 ~ Definition of terms
47 U.S.C. § 11 ~ Summary trials
47 U.S.C. § 12 ~ Application
47 U.S.C. § 13 ~ Jurisdiction

== Concession of Transatlantic Communications ==
The 18th President of the United States Ulysses Grant was the first public official advising the post-civil war states of the proposed wired communications between the coasts of America and France.

December 6, 1869: First Annual Message to the Senate and House of Representatives

It having come to my knowledge that a corporate company, organized under British laws, proposed to land upon the shores of the United States and to operate there a submarine cable, under a concession from His Majesty the Emperor of the French of an exclusive right for twenty years of telegraphic communication between the shores of France and the United States, with the very objectionable feature of subjecting all messages conveyed thereby to the scrutiny and control of the French Government, I caused the French and British legations at Washington to be made acquainted with the probable policy of Congress on this subject, as foreshadowed by the bill which passed the Senate in March last. This drew from the representatives of the company an agreement to accept as the basis of their operations the provisions of that bill, or of such other enactment on the subject as might be passed during the approaching session of Congress; also, to use their influence to secure from the French Government a modification of their concession, so as to permit the landing upon French soil of any cable belonging to any company incorporated by the authority of the United States or of any State in the Union, and, on their part, not to oppose the establishment of any such cable. In consideration of this agreement I directed the withdrawal of all opposition by the United States authorities to the landing of the cable and to the working of it until the meeting of Congress. I regret to say that there has been no modification made in the company's concession, nor, so far as I can learn, have they attempted to secure one. Their concession excludes the capital and the citizens of the United States from competition upon the shores of France. I recommend legislation to protect the rights of citizens of the United States, as well as the dignity and sovereignty of the nation, against such an assumption. I shall also endeavor to secure, by negotiation, an abandonment of the principle of monopolies in ocean telegraphic cables. Copies of this correspondence are herewith furnished.

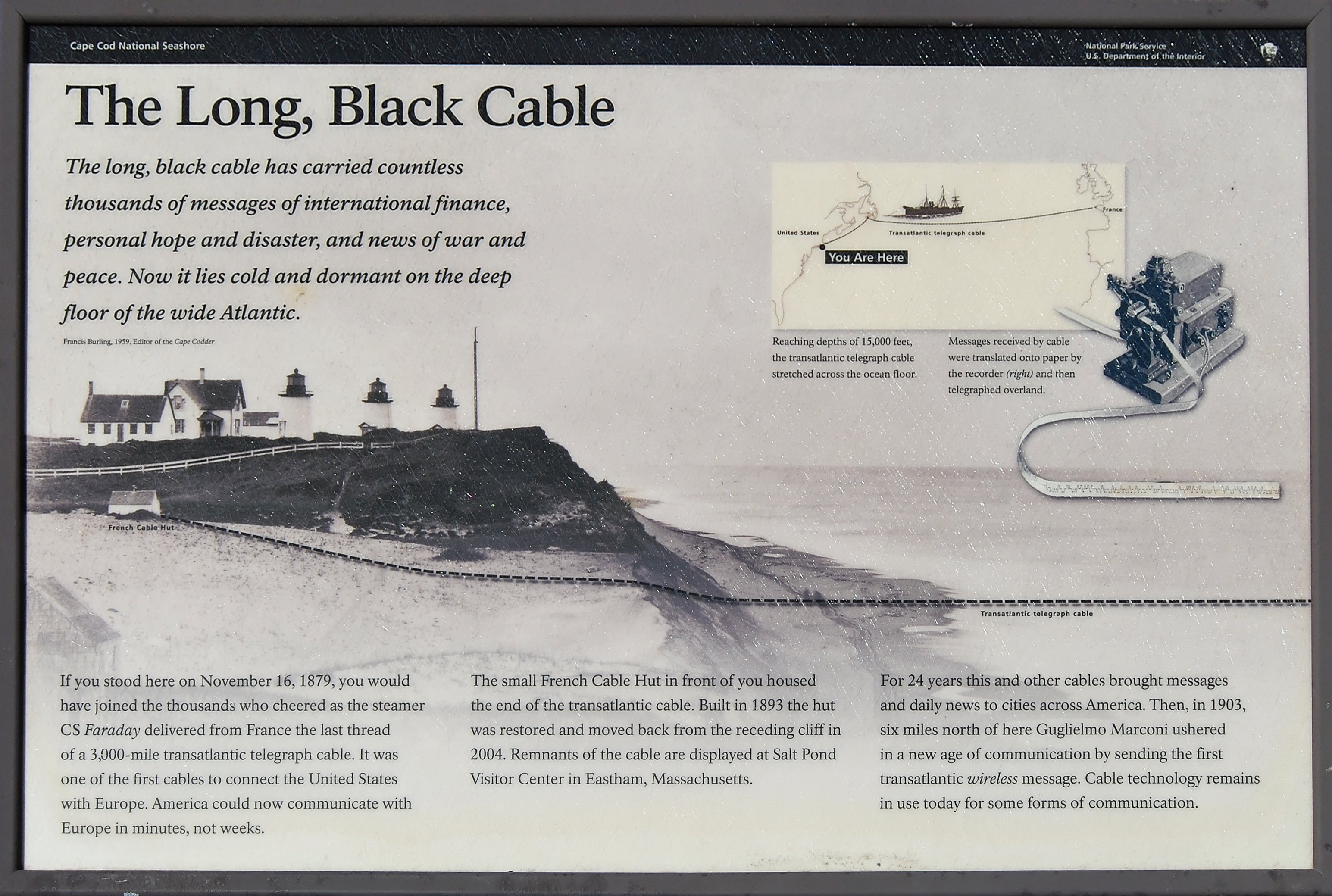
The Long Black Cable: Information sign at site of French Cable Hut, Eastham, Massachusetts

December 7, 1875: Seventh Annual Message to the Senate and House of Representatives

In 1869 a concession was granted by the French Government to a company which proposed to lay a cable from the shores of France to the United States. At that time there was a telegraphic connection between the United States and the continent of Europe (through the possessions of Great Britain at either end of the line), under the control of an association which had, at large outlay of capital and at great risk, demonstrated the practicability of maintaining such means of communication. The cost of correspondence by this agency was great, possibly not too large at the time for a proper remuneration for so hazardous and so costly an enterprise. It was, however, a heavy charge upon a means of communication which the progress in the social and commercial intercourse of the world found to be a necessity, and the obtaining of this French concession showed that other capital than that already invested was ready to enter into competition, with assurance of adequate return for their outlay. Impressed with the conviction that the interests, not only of the people of the United States, but of the world at large, demanded, or would demand, the multiplication of such means of communication between separated continents, I was desirous that the proposed connection should be made; but certain provisions of this concession were deemed by me to be objectionable, particularly one which gave for a long term of years the exclusive right of telegraphic communication by submarine cable between the shores of France and the United States. I could not concede that any power should claim the right to land a cable on the shores of the United States and at the same time deny to the United States, or to its citizens or grantees, an equal fight to land a cable on its shores. The right to control the conditions for the laying of a cable within the jurisdictional waters of the United States, to connect our shores with those of any foreign state, pertains exclusively to the Government of the United States, under such limitations and conditions as Congress may impose. In the absence of legislation by Congress I was unwilling, on the one hand, to yield to a foreign state the right to say that its grantees might land on our shores while it denied a similar right to our people to land on its shores, and, on the other hand, I was reluctant to deny to the great interests of the world and of civilization the facilities of such communication as were proposed. I therefore withheld any resistance to the landing of the cable on condition that the offensive monopoly feature of the concession be abandoned, and that the right of any cable which may be established by authority of this Government to land upon French territory and to connect with French land lines and enjoy all the necessary facilities or privileges incident to the use thereof upon as favorable terms as any other company be conceded. As the result thereof the company in question renounced the exclusive privilege, and the representative of France was informed that, understanding this relinquishment to be construed as granting the entire reciprocity and equal facilities which had been demanded, the opposition to the landing of the cable was withdrawn. The cable, under this French concession, was landed in the month of July, 1869, and has been an efficient and valuable agent of communication between this country and the other continent. It soon passed under the control, however, of those who had the management of the cable connecting Great Britain with this continent, and thus whatever benefit to the public might have ensued from competition between the two lines was lost, leaving only the greater facilities of an additional line and the additional security in case of accident to one of them. But these increased facilities and this additional security, together with the control of the combined capital of the two companies, gave also greater power to prevent the future construction of other lines and to limit the control of telegraphic communication between the two continents to those possessing the lines already laid. Within a few months past a cable has been laid, known as the United States Direct Cable Company, connecting the United States directly with Great Britain. As soon as this cable was reported to be laid and in working order the rates of the then existing consolidated companies were greatly reduced. Soon, however, a break was announced in this new cable, and immediately the rates of the other line, which had been reduced, were again raised. This cable being now repaired, the rates appear not to be reduced by either line from those formerly charged by the consolidated companies.

== Wartime Discretion ==
On April 6, 1917, the United States Congress passed a joint resolution declaring American entry into World War I. On April 28, 1917, the 28th President of the United States Woodrow Wilson issued Executive Order 2604 discontinuing the transmission of international communications.

== Act of 1921 ==
The Submarine Cable Act of 1921 appended Title 47 Telegraphy implementing licensing requirements for the coastal landing and operations of submarine cables along the United States coastal zones.

== See also ==
Cape Cod National Seashore	HMS Agamemnon (1852)
CS Faraday (1874)	Rye Beach, New Hampshire
Enderby's Wharf	SS Great Eastern
French Cable Hut	Transatlantic telegraph cable
French Cable Station	USS Niagara (1855)
Hazel Hill, Nova Scotia	Valentia Island

Pioneers of Intercontinental Communications and Submersible Telegraph Cable

Charles Tilston Bright	Josiah Latimer Clark
Charles Wheatstone	Samuel Canning
Cyrus West Field	Samuel Morse
Émile Baudot	Siemens Brothers
Frederic Newton Gisborne	Wildman Whitehouse
John Watkins Brett	William Fothergill Cooke

19th Century Submersible Telegraph Cable Ventures

♦ Atlantic Telegraph Company	♦ Hooper's Telegraph Works
♦ British and Irish Magnetic Telegraph Company	♦ India Rubber, Gutta Percha and Telegraph Works Company
♦ Compagnie française du télégraphe de Paris à New-York	♦ New York, Newfoundland and London Telegraph Company
♦ French Atlantic Cable Company	♦ Submarine Telegraph Company

== Pictorial of Transatlantic Communications Telegraph ==
Media related to Cable-laying ships at Wikimedia Commons
Media related to Maps of submarine telegraph cables at Wikimedia Commons
Media related to Maps of telegraph lines at Wikimedia Commons
Media related to Telegraph instruments at Wikimedia Commons

== Historical Video Archives ==
- Cable to the Continent on YouTube
- The Transatlantic Cable on YouTube
- Voice Beneath the Sea on YouTube

== Reading Bibliography ==
- Russell, William Howard (1866). The Atlantic Telegraph. London: Bacon and Co. pp. 1–178. ISBN 978-1108072472. OCLC 5064016.
- Saward, George (1878). The Trans-Atlantic Submarine Telegraph: A Brief Narrative of the Principal Incidents in the History of the Atlantic Telegraph Company. London: Privately Printed. pp. 1–80. ISBN 978-1332037094. OCLC 503767061.
- Field, Henry Martyn (1893). The Story of the Atlantic Telegraph. New York: C. Scribner's Sons. pp. 1–415. ISBN 978-1347283790. OCLC 4876574.
- Bright, Charles; Wünschendorff, Eugène (1898). Submarine Telegraphs: Their History, Construction, and Working. London: C. Lockwood & Son. pp. 1–866. ISBN 978-1108069489. OCLC 776529627.
- Scott, John Dick (1958). Siemens Brothers, 1858-1958: An Essay in the History of Industry. London: Weidenfeld and Nicolson. pp. 1–279. OCLC 574192.
- Haigh, Kenneth Richardson; Wilshaw, Edward (1968). Cableships and Submarine Cables. London: Adlard Coles. pp. 1–416. ISBN 978-0229973637. OCLC 803345817.
- Gordon, John Steele (2002). A Thread Across the Ocean: The Heroic Story of the Transatlantic Cable. New York: Walker & Co. pp. 1–240. ISBN 978-0802713643. OCLC 49743606.
- Wenzlhuemer, Roland (2012). Connecting the Nineteenth-Century World: The Telegraph and Globalization. Cambridge: Cambridge University Press. pp. 1–339. ISBN 978-1107025288. OCLC 798409133.
- Burnett, Douglas R.; Beckman, Robert; Davenport, Tara M. (2013). Submarine Cables: The Handbook of Law and Policy. Leiden: Martinus Nijhoff Publishers. pp. 1–488. ISBN 978-9004260337. OCLC 853313642.
