= Attempted net neutrality legislation in the United States =

Arguments associated with net neutrality regulations in the US came into prominence in mid-2002, offered by the "High Tech Broadband Coalition", a group comprising the Business Software Alliance; the Consumer Electronics Association; the Information Technology Industry Council; the National Association of Manufacturers; the Semiconductor Industry Association; and the Telecommunications Industry Association, some of which were developers for Amazon.com, Google, and Microsoft. The full concept of "net neutrality" was developed by regulators and legal academics, most prominently law professors Tim Wu, Lawrence Lessig and Federal Communications Commission Chairman Michael Powell often while speaking at the University of Colorado School of Law Annual Digital Broadband Migration conference or writing in the Journal of Telecommunications and High Technology Law.

By late 2005, several Congressional draft bills contained net neutrality regulations, as a part of ongoing proposals to reform the Telecommunications Act of 1996, requiring Internet providers to allow consumers access to any application, content, or service. However, important exceptions have permitted providers to discriminate for security purposes, or to offer specialized services like "broadband video" service.

In April 2006, a large coalition of public interest, consumer rights and free speech advocacy groups and thousands of bloggers—such as Free Press, People for the Ethical Treatment of Animals, American Library Association, Christian Coalition of America, Consumers Union, Common Cause and MoveOn.org—launched the SavetheInternet.com Coalition, a broad-based initiative working to "ensure that Congress passes no telecommunications legislation without meaningful and enforceable network neutrality protections." Within two months of its establishment, it delivered over 1,000,000 signatures to Congress in favor of net neutrality policies and by the end of 2006, it had collected more than 1.5 million signatures.

Two proposed versions of "neutrality" legislation were to prohibit: (1) the "tiering" of broadband through sale of voice- or video-oriented "Quality of Service" packages; and (2) content- or service-sensitive blocking or censorship on the part of broadband carriers. These bills were sponsored by Representatives Markey, Sensenbrenner, et al., and Senators Snowe, Dorgan, and Wyden.

In 2006 Congressman Adam Schiff (D-California), one of the Democrats who voted for the 2006 Sensenbrenner-Conyers bill, said: "I think the bill is a blunt instrument, and yet I think it does send a message that it's important to attain jurisdiction for the Justice Department and for antitrust issues."

The following legislative proposals have been introduced in Congress to address the net neutrality question:

Title	Bill number	Date introduced	Sponsors	Provisions	Status
109th Congress of the United States (January 2005 – January 2007)
Internet Freedom and Nondiscrimination Act of 2006	S. 2360	March 2, 2006	Senator Ron Wyden (D-Oregon)	Prohibits blocking or modification of data in transit, except to filter spam, malware, and illegal content; mandates common-carrier rules for subscriber network operators.; Sets some guidelines for how ISPs and data operators should behave when managing their networks. It states it as, "bars network operators from degrading, altering, modifying, impairing, or changing any bits, content, application, or service; requires them to allow the attachment of devices that won't harm the network; directs them to offer just, reasonable, and nondiscriminatory rates, terms, and conditions on the offering or provision of any service by another person using the transmission component of communications; and directs them to make their rates, terms, and conditions publicly available in a manner that is transparent and easily understandable."; The bill would also allow these operators to control any traffic that passes through their network, with the promise that it would be for the protection of the end-users. They would block content that falls under the categories of, "...ad ware, Spyware, malware, spam, pornography, content inappropriate for minors", "or any other similarly nefarious application or service that harms the Internet experience of subscribers..." As a way to allow subscribers to have a voice over whether they think that what their content provider is correct or not, there would be a method for them to submit complaints. These complaints would go directly to the FCC for review over whether a violation has occurred. The FCC would have one week to run its investigation. Then, if there was in fact a violation, the FCC would have another 90 days to make a ruling. During this time, "Network operators would carry the burden of proof during the latter part of the complaint proceeding."	Killed by the end of 109th Congress.
Communications Opportunity, Promotion and Enhancement Bill of 2006	H.R. 5252	March 30, 2006	Representative Joe Barton (R-Texas and Chairman of the House Commerce Committee)	Proposes to create a national franchise for video providers, and additionally addresses net neutrality, e911, and municipal broadband.; To promote the deployment of broadband networks and services.; Title IX establishes a number of rights for subscribers of Internet services in order to prevent an Internet Service Provider from undermining a consumer's experience on the Internet and from limiting the subscriber's ability to go wherever he or she wants on the Internet at whatever speed he or she purchased. In addition, this title would also provide consumers with the right to purchase stand-alone broadband service without having to purchase other services like video or phone service.	Passed, 321–101, by the full House of Representatives on June 8, 2006 – but with the Network Neutrality provisions of the Markey Amendment removed. Bill killed by end of 109th Congress.
Network Neutrality Act of 2006	H.R. 5273	April 3, 2006	Representative Ed Markey (D-Massachusetts)	Amends the Communications Opportunity, Promotion, and Enhancement Act of 2006 (COPE) to make its existing neutrality provisions more strict.; To preserve and promote the open and interconnected nature of broadband networks that enable consumers to reach, and service providers to offer, lawful content, applications, and services of their choosing, using their selection of devices that do not harm the network; to encourage escalating broadband transmission speeds and capabilities that reflect the evolving nature of the broadband networks, including the Internet, and improvements in access technology, which enables consumers to use and enjoy, and service providers to offer, a growing array of content, applications, and services; to provide for disclosure by broadband network operators of prices, terms, and conditions, and other relevant information, including information about the technical capabilities of broadband access provided to users, to inform their choices about services they rely on to communicate and to detect problems; and to ensure vigorous and prompt enforcement of this Act's requirements to safeguard and promote competition, innovation, market certainty, and consumer empowerment.	Defeated, 34–22, in committee with Republicans and some Democrats opposing, most Democrats supporting.
Communications Opportunity, Promotion and Enhancement Bill of 2006	S. 2686	May 1, 2006	Senators Ted Stevens (R-Alaska) & Daniel Inouye (D-Hawaii)	Aims to amend the Communications Act of 1934 and addresses net neutrality by directing the Federal Communications Commission (FCC) to conduct a study of abusive business practices predicted by the Save the Internet coalition and similar groups.	Sent to Senate in a 15–7 committee vote and defeated by the Senate Committee on Commerce, Science, & Transportation on June 28, 2006. Killed by the end of 109th Congress.
Internet Freedom and Nondiscrimination Act of 2006	H.R. 5417	May 18, 2006	Representatives Jim Sensenbrenner (R-Wisconsin) & John Conyers (D-Michigan)	Makes it a violation of the Clayton Antitrust Act for broadband providers to discriminate against any web traffic, refuse to connect to other providers, block or impair specific (legal) content; prohibits the use of admission control to determine network traffic priority.; Amends the Clayton Act to prohibit any broadband network provider from: failing to provide its services on reasonable and nondiscriminatory terms; refusing to interconnect its facilities with those of another service provider on reasonable and nondiscriminatory terms; blocking, impairing, discriminating against, or interfering with any person's ability to use a broadband network service to access or offer lawful content, applications, or services over the Internet (or imposing an additional charge to avoid such prohibited conduct); prohibiting a user from attaching or using a device on the provider's network that does not physically damage or materially degrade other users' utilization of the network; or failing to clearly and conspicuously disclose to users accurate information concerning service terms.; Requires a provider that prioritizes or offers enhanced quality of service to data of a particular type to prioritize or offer enhanced quality of service to all data of that type without imposing a surcharge or other consideration.; Permits a provider to take reasonable and nondiscriminatory measures to: manage the functioning of its network and services; give priority to emergency communications; prevent a violation of federal or state law; offer consumer protection services; offer special promotional pricing or other marketing initiatives; or prioritize or offer enhanced quality of service to all data of a particular type without imposing a surcharge or other consideration.	Approved, 20–13, by the House Judiciary committee on May 25, 2006. Killed by the end of 109th Congress.
110th Congress of the United States (January 2007 – January 2009)
Internet Freedom Preservation Act (casually known as the Snowe-Dorgan bill)	S. 215 (110th Congress) formerly S. 2917 (109th Congress)	January 9, 2007	Senators Olympia Snowe (R-Maine) & Byron Dorgan (D-North Dakota), Co-Sponsors: Barack Obama (D-Illinois), Hillary Clinton (D-New York), John Kerry (D-Massachusetts) and other Senators	Amends the Communications Act of 1934. Introduces a ban on the blocking/degradation of lawful content, forbids tying Internet access to purchase further services, and a ban on QoS deals between network providers and specific content providers but still allows prioritizing content that originates from the provider's own network, see Sec. 12 (a) (5). Makes the FCC responsible for enforcing complaints and conducting reports on the state of the broadband market.; A bill to amend the Communications Act of 1934 to ensure net neutrality.; Each broadband provider shall not block, interfere with, discriminate against, impair, or degrade the ability of any person to use a broadband service to access, use, send, post, receive, or offer any lawful content, application, or service made available via the Internet; not prevent or obstruct a user from attaching or using any device to the network of such broadband service provider, only if such device does not physically damage or substantially degrade the use of such network by other subscribers.	Read twice and referred to the U.S. Senate Committee on Commerce, Science, and Transportation.
Internet Freedom Preservation Act of 2008	H.R.5353	February 12, 2008	Representatives Edward Markey (D-Massachusetts) & Charles Pickering (R-Mississippi)	To establish broadband policy and direct the Federal Communications Commission to conduct a proceeding and public broadband summits to assess competition, consumer protection, and consumer choice issues relating to broadband Internet access services, and for other purposes.; To maintain the freedom to use broadband telecommunications networks, including the Internet, without unreasonable interference from or discrimination by network operators; enable the United States to preserve its global leadership in online commerce and technological innovation; promote the open and interconnected nature of broadband networks that enable consumers to reach, and service providers to offer, content, applications, and services of their choosing; and guard against unreasonable discriminatory favoritism for, or degradation of, content by network operators based upon its source, ownership, or destination on the Internet.; Requires the Federal Communications Commission (FCC) to commence a proceeding on broadband services and consumer rights, including assessing whether broadband network providers to refrain from unreasonably interfering with the ability of consumers to access, use, send, receive, or offer content, applications, or services of their choice, and attach or connect their choice of devices; and add charges for quality of service to certain Internet applications and service providers.	Introduced to the House Energy and Commerce Committee
111th Congress of the United States (January 2009 – January 2011)
Internet Freedom Preservation Act of 2009	H.R.3458	2009	–	To amend the Communications Act of 1934 to establish a national broadband policy, safeguard consumer rights, spur investment and innovation, and for related purposes.; Makes it the duty of each Internet access service provider to: not block, interfere with, discriminate against, impair, or degrade the ability of any person to use an Internet access service; not impose certain charges on any Internet content, service, or application provider; not prevent or obstruct a user from attaching or using any lawful device in conjunction with such service, provided the device does not harm the provider's network; offer Internet access service to any requesting person; not provide or sell to any content, application, or service provider any offering that prioritizes traffic over that of other such providers; and not install or use network features, functions, or capabilities that impede or hinder compliance with these duties.; It excludes reasonable network management from regulation, but because it doesn't contain technical specifications to describe "reasonable network management" schemes, it remains unclear what degree of autonomy network operators would have in managing traffic.	–
112th Congress of the United States (January 2011 – January 2013)
Data Cap Integrity Act of 2012	S. 3703	December 20, 2012	Senator Ron Wyden (D-Oregon)	To improve the ability of consumers to control their digital data usage, promote Internet use, and for other purposes.	Read twice and referred to the Committee on Commerce, Science, and Transportation.
(D) = a member of the House or Senate Democratic Caucus; (R) = a member of the House or Senate Republican Conference
