= Federal Communications Commission Consolidated Reporting Act of 2013 =

Proposed United States legislation

- Long title: To amend the Communications Act of 1934 to consolidate the reporting obligations of the Federal Communications Commission in order to improve congressional oversight and reduce reporting burdens.
- Announced in: the 113th United States Congress
- Sponsored by: Rep. Steve Scalise (R, LA-1)
- Number of co-sponsors: 2

Codification
- Acts affected: Communications Act of 1934, Telecommunications Act of 1996, Broadband Data Improvement Act, Indian Self-Determination and Education Assistance Act, Communications Satellite Act of 1962
- U.S.C. sections affected: 47 U.S.C. § 151 et seq., 47 U.S.C. § 1302, 25 U.S.C. § 450b, 47 U.S.C. § 765e, 47 U.S.C. § 703, 47 U.S.C. § 1303, 47 U.S.C. § 548, 47 U.S.C. § 543, 47 U.S.C. § 533(a)(3), 47 U.S.C. § 257, 47 U.S.C. § 1302, 47 U.S.C. § 332(c)(1)(C), 47 U.S.C. § 154
- Agencies affected: United States Congress, Federal Communications Commission,

Legislative history
- Introduced in the House as H.R. 2844 by Rep. Steve Scalise (R, LA-1) on July 26, 2013; Committee consideration by United States House Committee on Energy and Commerce, United States House Energy Subcommittee on Communications and Technology, United States Senate Committee on Commerce, Science, and Transportation; Passed the House on September 9, 2013 (Roll Call 449: 415-0)

The Federal Communications Commission Consolidated Reporting Act of 2013 (H.R. 2844) is a bill that passed the United States House of Representatives during the 113th United States Congress. The bill would "require the Federal Communications Commission (FCC) to prepare a biennial report for the Congress that assesses certain characteristics of the communications industry." That report would include an analysis of "the state of competition in the markets for voice, video, and data services, as well as the availability of high-speed and high-quality telecommunications services" in the United States. Perhaps most importantly, "the bill would require the FCC to determine whether laws and regulations pose a barrier to entry into communications markets and to include that information in the biennial report." The bill would also cancel a number of preexisting requirements for various other reports from the FCC.

== Provisions of the bill ==
This summary is based largely on the summary provided by the Congressional Research Service, a public domain source.

The Federal Communications Commission Consolidated Reporting Act of 2013 would amend the Communications Act of 1934 to require the Federal Communications Commission (FCC) to publish on its website and submit to Congress a biennial report on the state of the communications marketplace assessing:

(1) competition, including intermodal, facilities-based, and new and emergent services competition and addressing the provision of content, as well as communications using the Internet;
(2) deployment of communications capabilities, including whether advanced telecommunications capability is being deployed to all Americans in a reasonable and timely fashion; and
(3) whether laws, regulations, or regulatory practices pose a barrier to competitive entry or expansion of existing providers of communications services.

The bill would also require the FCC to: (1) compile a list of geographic areas that are not served by any provider of advanced telecommunications capability; and (2) consider market entry barriers for entrepreneurs and other small businesses in the communications marketplace in accordance with existing national policy favoring diversity of media voices, vigorous economic competition, technological advancement, and promotion of the public interest, convenience, and necessity.

The bill would also repeal and consolidate various FCC reports including reports on satellite competition, international broadband, video programming, cable industry prices, small business entry barriers, commercial mobile radio, waivers from requirements prohibiting FCC employees from being financially interested in companies subject to FCC regulation, and several other existing reports under such Act.

== Congressional Budget Office report ==
H.R. 2844 would require the Federal Communications Commission (FCC) to prepare a biennial report for the Congress that assesses certain characteristics of the communications industry. The report would analyze the state of competition in the markets for voice, video, and data services, as well as the availability of high-speed and high-quality telecommunications services. Further, the bill would require the FCC to determine whether laws and regulations pose a barrier to entry into communications markets and to include that information in the biennial report. H.R. 2844 also would relieve the FCC of requirements to prepare certain other reports on topics ranging from access to satellite services to prices for cable services. In all, the bill would eliminate more than 20 reports and notices, some that remain in current law even though deadlines for their completion have passed.

Based on information from the FCC, the Congressional Budget Office (CBO) estimates that implementing the provisions of H.R. 2844 would not have a significant net effect on the agency's discretionary costs. Any additional expenses the FCC would incur to prepare the new assessment of the communications industry would be offset by a reduction in costs that would otherwise be incurred for reports that would be eliminated under the bill. Under current law, the FCC is authorized to collect fees sufficient to offset the cost of its regulatory activities each year; therefore, the CBO estimates that the net cost to implement the provisions of H.R. 2844 would be negligible, assuming annual appropriation actions consistent with the agency's authorities. Enacting H.R. 2844 would not affect direct spending or revenues; therefore, pay-as-you-go procedures do not apply.

H.R. 2844 contains no intergovernmental or private-sector mandates as defined in the Unfunded Mandates Reform Act and would not affect the budgets of state, local, or tribal governments.

== Procedural history ==
=== House ===
The Federal Communications Commission Consolidated Reporting Act of 2013 was introduced on July 26, 2013 by Rep. Steve Scalise (R, LA-1). It was referred to the United States House Committee on Energy and Commerce and the United States House Energy Subcommittee on Communications and Technology. The bill passed in the House on September 9, 2013 in Roll Call Vote 449 by 415-0.

=== Senate ===
The Federal Communications Commission Consolidated Reporting Act of 2013 was received in the United States Senate on September 10, 2013. It was referred to the United States Senate Committee on Commerce, Science, and Transportation.

== Debate and discussion ==
The United States Chamber of Commerce wrote a letter to the members of the United States House Energy Subcommittee on Communications and Technology in support of the bill. They supported the bill because they recognized it "would consolidate various FCC reports to Congress into a more useful comprehensive biennial report on the state of the communications marketplace."

The bill was considered non-controversial and received 0 no votes in the House.

== See also ==
- List of bills in the 113th United States Congress
- Federal Communications Commission
