= McGoldrick v. Berwind-White Coal Mining Co. =

- Supreme Court of the United States

Argued January 2, 1940 Decided January 29, 1940
- Full case name: McGoldrick v. Berwind-White Coal Mining Company
- Citations: 309 U.S. 33 (more) 60 S. Ct. 388; 84 L. Ed. 565

Court membership
- Chief Justice Charles E. Hughes Associate Justices James C. McReynolds · Harlan F. Stone; Owen Roberts · Hugo Black; Stanley F. Reed · Felix Frankfurter; William O. Douglas · Frank Murphy

Case opinions
- Majority: Stone, joined by Black, Reed, Frankfurter, Douglas, Murphy
- Dissent: Hughes, joined by McReynolds, Roberts

McGoldrick v. Berwind-White Coal Mining Co., 309 U.S. 33 (1940), is United States Supreme Court case upholding the legality under the Constitution's Commerce Clause of a tax by the City of New York upon the purchase of coal by public utility and steamship companies based in New York from Berwind-White Coal Mining Company, a Pennsylvania coal company through its New York office.

== See also ==
- List of United States Supreme Court cases, volume 309
