= French Cable Station =

- U.S. National Register of Historic Places
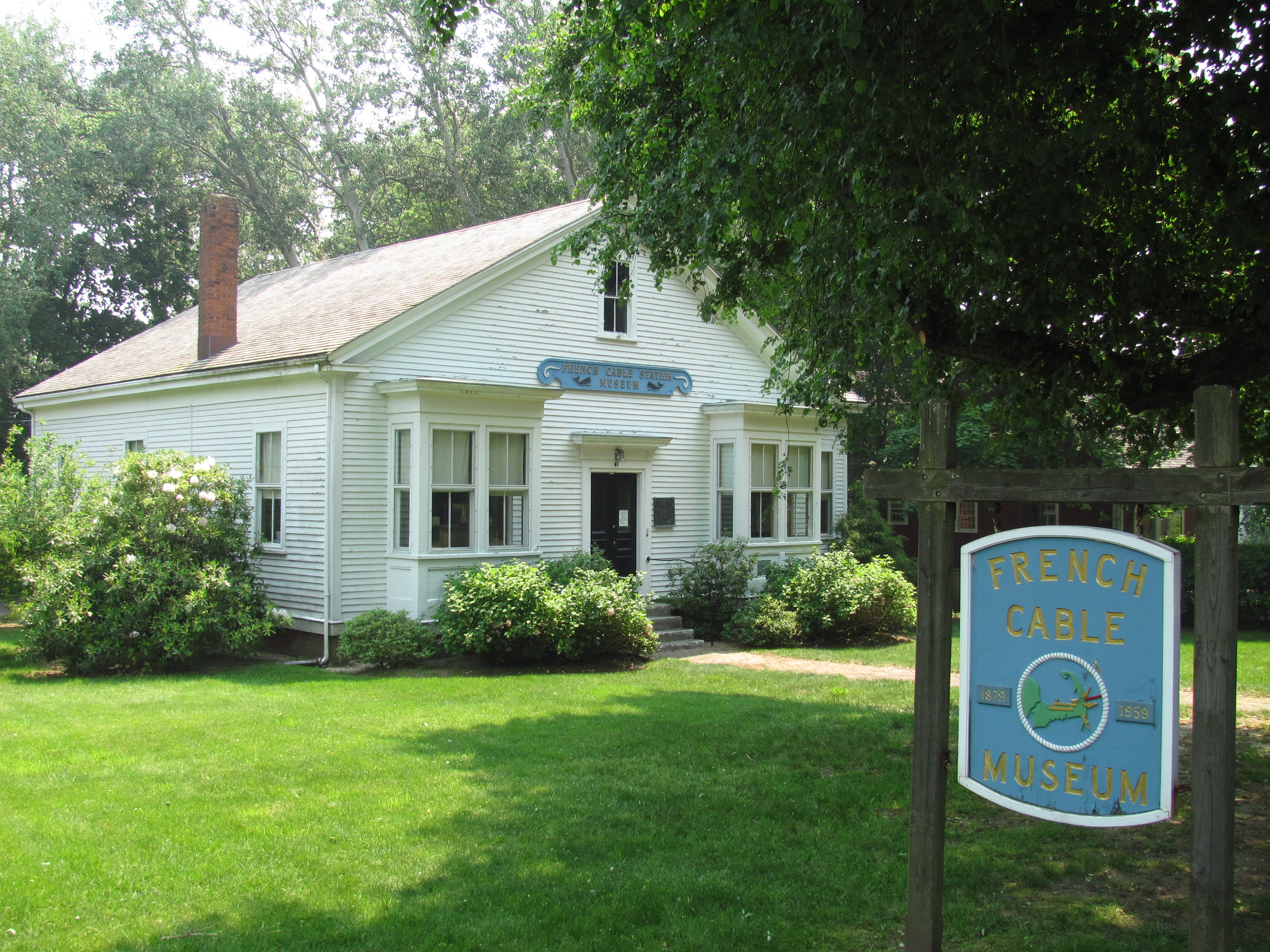
- French Cable Station

- Location within Cape Cod Location within Massachusetts Location within the United States
- Location: Orleans, Massachusetts
- Coordinates: 41°47′16″N 69°59′16″W
- Built: 1891
- NRHP reference No.: 72000121
- Added to NRHP: April 11, 1972

The French Cable Station is a historic telegraph station on the southeast corner of Cove Road and MA 28 in Orleans, Massachusetts.

It was built in 1891 by the French Cable Company, which was installing numerous cables in Cape Cod throughout the late 19th century. By 1898 the station was the terminus of a 3,200-mile-long (5,100 km) trans-Atlantic telegraph cable called "Le Direct." When France surrendered to Nazi Germany in 1940, it was taken over by the federal government for security reasons, but wasn't returned to the company until 1952. The company resumed operations until 1959. After being purchased by ten prominent Orleans citizens in 1972, it was added to the National Register of Historic Places the same year.

The building now serves as the French Cable Station Museum, featuring displays of Atlantic undersea telegraphic cables, instruments, maps, and memorabilia.

== See also ==
- French Cable Hut
- National Register of Historic Places listings in Barnstable County, Massachusetts
