= Augustin Pouyer-Quertier =

French politician and businessman

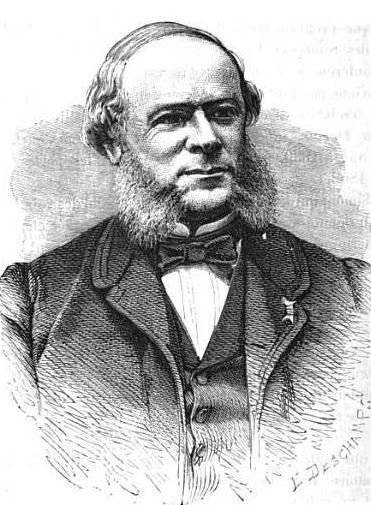

Augustin Thomas Pouyer-Quertier, (2 September 1820 – 2 April 1891) was Minister for Finance of France.

He was born in Étouteville-en-Caux (Seine-Maritime), and died in Rouen.

He developed a cotton factory and cotton agriculture in Algeria.

He was one of the founders of Compagnie française du télégraphe de Paris à New-York, the French Telegraph Company, in 1879.
