= French Cable Hut =

- U.S. National Register of Historic Places
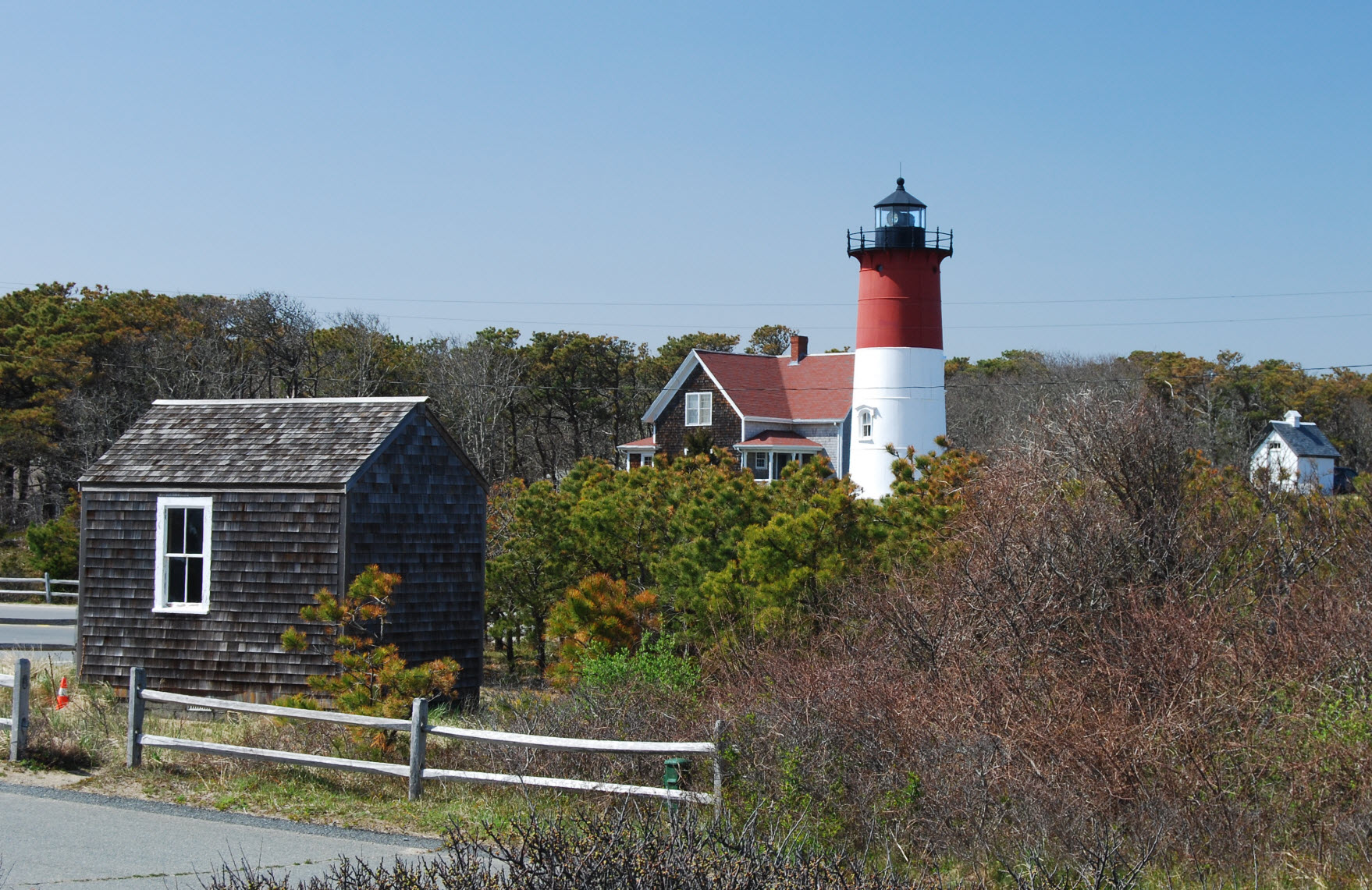
- Relocated French Cable Hut, near Nauset Light

- Location within Cape Cod
- Nearest city: North Eastham, Massachusetts
- Coordinates: 41°51′34″N 69°57′7″W
- Built: 1891
- Architect: French Cable Company
- Architectural style: Colonial
- NRHP reference No.: 76000153
- Added to NRHP: April 22, 1976

The French Cable Hut is a historic building in Cape Cod National Seashore, near the Nauset Beach Light in Eastham, Massachusetts. Built in 1891, the hut formed a linkage point in the transatlantic telegraph cable of the French Cable Company connecting the cable, where it came ashore near the present site to its main station in Orleans. After the cable was abandoned in 1932, the hut was adapted for residential use. It has since been restored to its turn-of-the-century appearance by the National Park Service. The building was listed on the National Register of Historic Places in 1976.

== Description and history ==
The cable hut is a small single-story wood-frame structure with a gable roof, and measures about 10 by 15 feet (3.0 m × 4.6 m). Its walls are finished in wooden shingles, and it has simple white trim. There is a door in one gable end, and a single sash window in one of the side walls. The building was restored to its early 20th-century appearance in 1998–2000, after being relocated about 200 feet (61 m) from the eroding shoreline. It is set in a historically compatible way near the Nauset Beach Light, which was also moved in the 1990s.

The first French-owned transatlantic cable was laid in 1869 from Brest, France to Duxbury, Massachusetts, and was acquired by an American company in 1873. A new French Cable Company was established, which in 1879 laid a second cable to Eastham via Saint Pierre and Miquelon, with a small station near the shore in Eastham. For the benefit of its workers, the company established a new station in Orleans (which now houses a museum), and replaced the original station with this hut, where the transatlantic cable was joined to one running along Nauset Beach and through Town Cove to Orleans.

The cable was operated until World War II, when it was abandoned with the French surrender to Nazi Germany in 1940. The cabin was abandoned, and auctioned by the town for back taxes in 1946, without prior notification to the company. The new owners added living quarters, increasing the building's size to about 20 by 26 feet (6.1 m × 7.9 m). The original hut footprint, which had originally been unfinished inside, was finished for use as a living room, and bedrooms and a kitchen were built on. This building was used as a seasonal rental property until 1972, when it was acquired by the National Park Service as part of the Cape Cod National Seashore. The park service used it for seasonal employee housing.

When surveyed in 1986, the hut was about 20 feet (6.1 m) from the edge of the bluff above Nauset Beach. In 1998 the building was relocated back from the bluff and restored to its original appearance, removing the living quarters and alterations made in the mid-20th century.

The cable hut was featured in an episode of the PBS television series History Detectives concerning a 19th-century transatlantic telegraph cable.

== See also ==
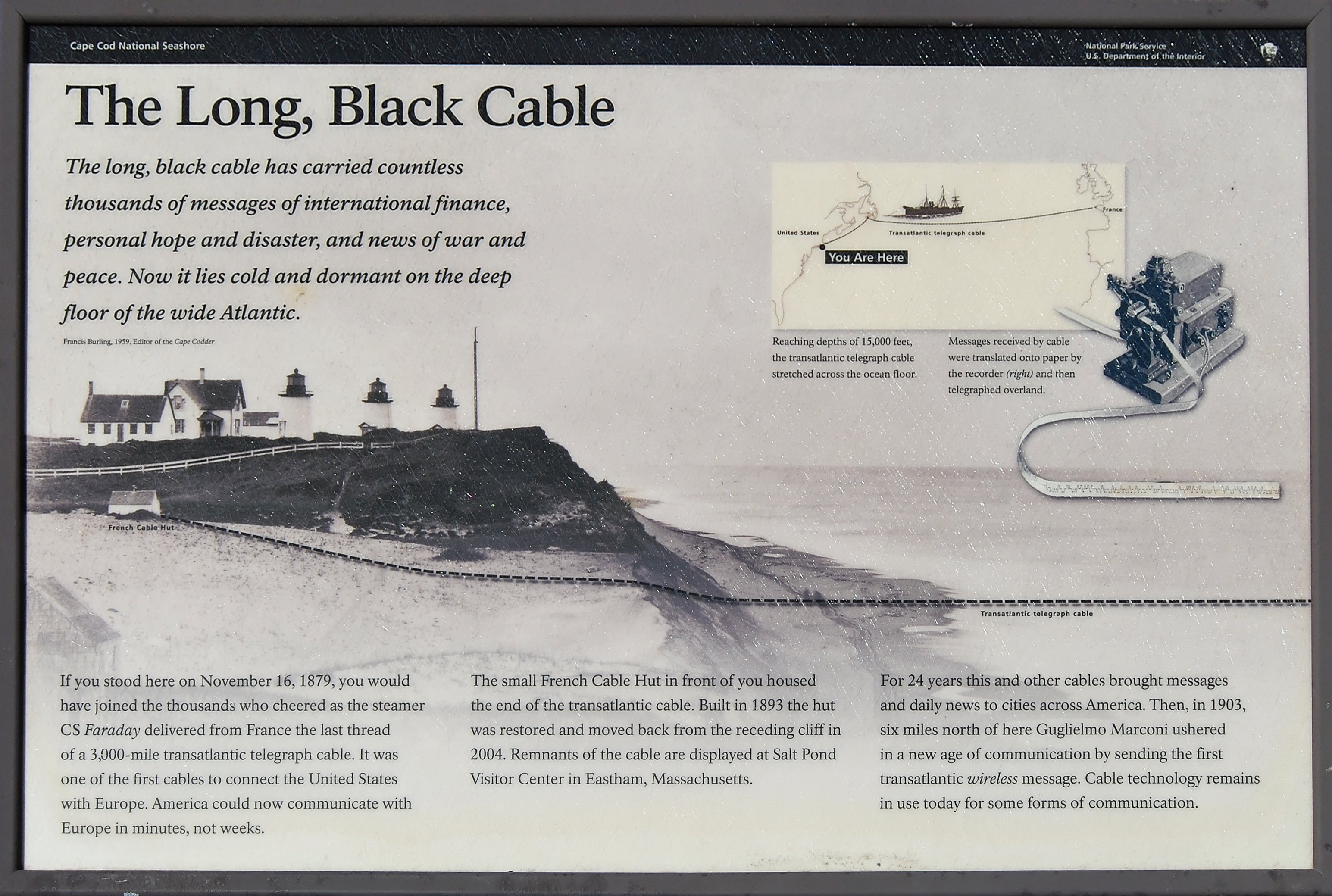
Informational sign at site of French Cable Hut, Eastham, Massachusetts

- French Cable Station
- National Register of Historic Places listings in Cape Cod National Seashore
- National Register of Historic Places listings in Barnstable County, Massachusetts
