= CBS, Inc. v. FCC =

1981 United States Supreme Court case

CBS, Inc. v. Federal Communications Commission
- Supreme Court of the United States

Argued March 3, 1981 Decided July 1, 1981
- Full case name: Columbia Broadcasting System, Incorporated, et al., Appellants v. Federal Communications Commission, et al.
- Citations: 453 U.S. 367 (more)

Case history
- Prior: 202 U.S. App. D.C. 369, 629 F.2d 1, affirmed

Holding
- Section 312 (a) (7) created an affirmative, promptly enforceable right of reasonable access to the use of broadcast stations for individual candidates seeking federal elective office, which went beyond merely codifying prior FCC policies developed under the public interest standard.

Court membership
- Chief Justice Warren E. Burger Associate Justices William J. Brennan Jr. · Potter Stewart; Byron White · Thurgood Marshall; Harry Blackmun · Lewis F. Powell Jr. William Rehnquist · John P. Stevens

Case opinions
- Majority: Burger, joined by Brennan, Stewart, Marshall, Blackmun, Powell
- Dissent: White, joined by Rehnquist, Stevens
- Dissent: Stevens

CBS, Inc. v. FCC, 453 U.S. 367 (1981), is a United States Supreme Court decision finding that the Federal Communications Act of 1934 created a new, individual right to broadcast access for candidates for federal office. Under this decision broadcast media were found to have an obligation to allow any legally qualified federal candidate running for public office to purchase network time under section 312(a)(7) of the 1976 amendment to the Communications Act.

== Background ==
Since the overuse of broadcast frequencies can cause signal interference broadcasting has been regulated since its infancy under the Radio Act of 1927. Regulation was grounded in fears that signal interference could limit the development of radio leading to media concentration. The Communications Act of 1934 tried to balance the regulatory goal of using public airwaves to further the public interest against freedom of the press. Under the Campaign Communications Reform Act of 1971 the 1934 law was amended to allow for the revocation of broadcast licenses in cases candidates for federal office were denied reasonable access to the airwaves.

== Case history ==
After the three major broadcasting networks denied the Carter-Mondale Presidential Committee (CMPC) the purchase of air time for campaign purposes the FCC determined that the networks had failed to meet the requirements imposed by section 312(a)(7) of the Communications Act. The networks filed for judicial review of the FCC's determination. The FCC orders were upheld by the DC Court of Appeals.

== Supreme Court decision ==
The Supreme Court found that the right of access as provided for in section 312(a)(7) of the Communications Act did not violate broadcasters' first amendment rights. They held that the statute created a special right of access to broadcast media for federal candidates.

== See also ==
- United States free speech exceptions
