= Layered Model of Regulation =

Proposal for American telecommunications public policy

The layered model of telecommunication regulation is a proposal for nascent US telecommunication public policies that mimic the horizontal characteristics of Internet Protocol communication and the OSI model. Advocates of layered telecommunication policies argue that current US regulations are not longer appropriate for new information technologies as functionally similar services (such as DSL and cable modems) are not governed by a common set of rules but instead subject to separate regulatory systems written for each distinct media type such as the telephone or cable television systems.

The layered policy model proposes a regulatory system that classifies technologies based on their common layered characteristics instead of regulating each communication technology with a disparate set of rules. Horizontal policy advocates argue that this modular approach to regulation promotes competition by forcing all telecommunication services to adhere to a uniform set of characteristic-based rules, thereby enhancing the competitive characteristics of an open marketplace.

Layered policy advocates argue that horizontal policies will provide regulatory clarity for current technologies and they will also be adaptable to future technologies. Layered policies could also provide an equal framework for local governments to provide municipal broadband services in a fair and competitive manner alongside private telecommunication providers.

== See also ==
- Telecommunications policy of the United States
