= Wagner–Hatfield amendment =

Wagner–Hatfield amendment was a proposed amendment to the Communications Act of 1934 aimed at turning over twenty-five percent of all radio channels to non-profit radio broadcasters. The amendment, proposed by senators Robert Wagner of New York and Henry Hatfield of West Virginia, would have given the issue to the new Federal Communications Commission (FCC) to study and to hold hearings on the effectiveness of the amendment and to reported its finding to Congress.

The amendment, was designed to take effect within ninety days of the creation of the FCC and was supported by educators who wanted more radio access. The radio lobby attacked the Wagner–Hatfield amendment fiercely. Initially, it appeared that the amendment would pass, but it was defeated on the Senate floor on May 15, 1934, by a vote of 42–23, mostly because the clause added to the communications bill that called for the FCC to study the viability of the Wagner-Hatfield proposal and report to Congress the following year. The passage of the Communications Act of 1934 Congress effectively removed itself from the discussion of broadcast policy issues.
