= FCC v. Sanders Brothers Radio Station =

- Supreme Court of the United States

Argued February 9–, 1940 Decided March 25, 1940
- Full case name: Federal Communications Commission v. Sanders Brothers Radio Station
- Citations: 309 U.S. 470 (more) 60 S.Ct. 693

Case history
- Prior: Sanders Brothers Radio Station v. Federal Communications Commission, 106 F.2d 321; cert. granted, 308 U.S. 546 (1939).

Holding
- Spectrum allocation decisions made by the Federal Communications Commission are made to serve the public interest and do not have to consider broadcaster profitability or business plans.

Court membership
- Chief Justice Charles E. Hughes Associate Justices James C. McReynolds · Harlan F. Stone; Owen Roberts · Hugo Black; Stanley F. Reed · Felix Frankfurter; William O. Douglas · Frank Murphy

Case opinion
- Majority: Roberts
- McReynolds took no part in the consideration or decision of the case.

Laws applied
- Communications Act of 1934

Federal Communications Commission v. Sanders Brothers Radio Station, 309 U.S. 470 (1940), was an early precedent on the enforcement of broadcasting law in the United States. The Supreme Court held that when the Federal Communications Commission (FCC) makes spectrum allocation decisions regarding the use of broadcast frequencies by radio stations, such decisions should be made to serve the public interest, convenience, and necessity as defined by the Communications Act of 1934. Consequently, such decisions by the FCC do not need to consider the profitability or business interests of the companies assigned such frequencies, or those of their competitors.

== Background ==
In 1936, the Telegraph Herald, a newspaper in Dubuque, Iowa, applied to the FCC for a permit to construct a radio station, along with an allocated frequency on which to broadcast content. Shortly thereafter. the existing radio station WKBB in nearby East Dubuque, Illinois applied for a permit to move its transmitter to Dubuque. Upon learning of the Telegraph Herald application, the owners of WKBB appealed to the FCC to reject that application, in the belief that Dubuque did not have a large enough radio market for two different stations to be profitable, and that their frequencies would interfere with each other. Using language from the Communications Act of 1934, the owners of WKBB argued that allowing the Telegraph Herald to build a second station would not serve the public interest, convenience, and necessity for the Dubuque region.

An FCC examiner originally agreed with WKBB's position, though the Commission eventually decided to grant both applications. The Commission concluded that there was no evidence that the two stations would interfere with each other; meanwhile, both applicants were qualified to operate radio stations, and having two competing stations would be a benefit for the Dubuque region.

The owners of WKBB appealed this FCC decision to the District of Columbia Circuit Court, which held that the commission should have considered economic injury to the area's existing radio station (WKBB), and failing to do so resulted in an arbitrary and capricious licensing decision that was prohibited by American administrative law. The FCC appealed this ruling to the United States Supreme Court.

== Opinion of the court ==
The Supreme Court reversed the circuit court decision. The Telegraph Herald had argued previously that the Communications Act of 1934 includes no requirements for the FCC to consider economic injury or business profitability when issuing radio station licenses, and those matters cannot be implied from the statute's language concerning the public interest, convenience, and necessity of broadcast licensing decisions. It was also noted that the owners of WKBB provided no verifiable evidence of potential economic harm if a competing radio station began operating in the area.

The Supreme Court viewed the dispute as an opportunity to examine the "function and powers" of the then relatively new FCC. The court held that the Communications Act "contains no express command that in passing upon an application the Commission must consider the effect of competition with an existing station", and that the Commission need only consider its statutory requirements for fostering the development of networks and managing the use of spectrum frequencies. According to the court, the commission's primary responsibility is to ensure that frequencies are used efficiently and to avoid interference, and since interference was not found to be a risk in the present dispute, the commission acted appropriately in granting licenses to both operators. Furthermore, the Communications Act did not instruct the FCC to regulate the internal business operations of its licensees, and WKBB's complaint about unfair or damaging competition would instead be a matter for the Interstate Commerce Commission.

Per Supreme Court precedent, broadcast frequencies were considered a matter of free competition in which the number of operators is only constrained by the scarcity of available frequencies, unlike other businesses such as railroads in which a new market entrant could have significant economic effects on the marketplace. However, the FCC is enabled to consider the effects of competition among radio stations if the public interest would be impacted, which was not found to be the case in the present dispute.

== Impact ==
FCC v. Sanders Brothers Radio Station is often cited as a seminal ruling on the authority of the United States government, via the FCC, to regulate the broadcast radio and television industries, and on the government's stance that the broadcasting market should benefit from free competition. The case has also been cited as an instructive precedent on the then relatively new issue of judicial review of regulatory decisions by subject matter agencies, such as the FCC's authority over the precise matter of spectrum allocation.

== See also ==
- List of United States Supreme Court cases, volume 309
