= Fortnightly Corp. v. United Artists Television, Inc. =

- Supreme Court of the United States

Argued March 13, 1968 Decided June 17, 1968
- Full case name: Fortnightly Corp. v. United Artists Television, Inc.
- Citations: 392 U.S. 390 (more) 88 S. Ct. 2084; 20 L. Ed. 2d 1176

Case history
- Prior: 377 F.2d 872 (2d Cir. 1967)

Holding
- Receiving a television broadcast does not constitute a "performance" of a work.

Court membership
- Chief Justice Earl Warren Associate Justices Hugo Black · William O. Douglas; John M. Harlan II · William J. Brennan Jr. Potter Stewart · Byron White; Abe Fortas · Thurgood Marshall

Case opinions
- Majority: Stewart, joined by Warren, Black, Brennan, White
- Dissent: Fortas
- Douglas, Marshall, and Harlan took no part in the consideration or decision of the case.

Fortnightly Corp. v. United Artists Television, Inc., 392 U.S. 390 (1968), was a United States Supreme Court case in which the Court held that receiving a television broadcast does not constitute a "performance" of a work.

In 1968, the United States Copyright Office called this case "the most important American copyright case of the 1960s."
