= List of United States Supreme Court cases, volume 309 =

Supreme Court of the United States
- Interactive map of Supreme Court of the United States
- 38°53′26″N 77°00′16″W
- Established: March 4, 1789; 236 years ago
- Location: Washington, D.C.
- Coordinates: 38°53′26″N 77°00′16″W
- Composition method: Presidential nomination with Senate confirmation
- Authorised by: Constitution of the United States, Art. III, § 1
- Judge term length: life tenure, subject to impeachment and removal
- Number of positions: 9 (by statute)
- Website: supremecourt.gov

This is a list of cases reported in volume 309 of United States Reports, decided by the Supreme Court of the United States in 1939 and 1940.

== Justices of the Supreme Court at the time of volume 309 U.S. ==
The Supreme Court is established by Article III, Section 1 of the Constitution of the United States, which says: "The judicial Power of the United States, shall be vested in one supreme Court . . .". The size of the Court is not specified; the Constitution leaves it to Congress to set the number of justices. Under the Judiciary Act of 1789 Congress originally fixed the number of justices at six (one chief justice and five associate justices). Since 1789 Congress has varied the size of the Court from six to seven, nine, ten, and back to nine justices (always including one chief justice).

When the cases in volume 309 were decided the Court comprised the following members:

Portrait	Justice	Office	Home State	Succeeded	Date confirmed by the Senate (Vote)	Tenure on Supreme Court
	Charles Evans Hughes	Chief Justice	New York	William Howard Taft	February 13, 1930 (52–26)	February 24, 1930 – June 30, 1941 (Retired)
	James Clark McReynolds	Associate Justice	Tennessee	Horace Harmon Lurton	August 29, 1914 (44–6)	October 12, 1914 – January 31, 1941 (Retired)
	Harlan F. Stone	Associate Justice	New York	Joseph McKenna	February 5, 1925 (71–6)	March 2, 1925 – July 2, 1941 (Continued as chief justice)
	Owen Roberts	Associate Justice	Pennsylvania	Edward Terry Sanford	May 20, 1930 (Acclamation)	June 2, 1930 – July 31, 1945 (Resigned)
	Hugo Black	Associate Justice	Alabama	Willis Van Devanter	August 17, 1937 (63–16)	August 19, 1937 – September 17, 1971 (Retired)
	Stanley Forman Reed	Associate Justice	Kentucky	George Sutherland	January 25, 1938 (Acclamation)	January 31, 1938 – February 25, 1957 (Retired)
	Felix Frankfurter	Associate Justice	Massachusetts	Benjamin Nathan Cardozo	January 17, 1939 (Acclamation)	January 30, 1939 – August 28, 1962 (Retired)
	William O. Douglas	Associate Justice	Connecticut	Louis Brandeis	April 4, 1939 (62–4)	April 17, 1939 – November 12, 1975 (Retired)
	Frank Murphy	Associate Justice	Michigan	Pierce Butler	January 16, 1940 (Acclamation)	February 5, 1940 – July 19, 1949 (Died)

== Federal court system ==
Under the Judiciary Act of 1789 the federal court structure at the time comprised District Courts, which had general trial jurisdiction; Circuit Courts, which had mixed trial and appellate (from the US District Courts) jurisdiction; and the United States Supreme Court, which had appellate jurisdiction over the federal District and Circuit courts—and for certain issues over state courts. The Supreme Court also had limited original jurisdiction (i.e., in which cases could be filed directly with the Supreme Court without first having been heard by a lower federal or state court). There were one or more federal District Courts and/or Circuit Courts in each state, territory, or other geographical region.

The Judiciary Act of 1891 created the United States Courts of Appeals and reassigned the jurisdiction of most routine appeals from the district and circuit courts to these appellate courts. The Act created nine new courts that were originally known as the "United States Circuit Courts of Appeals." The new courts had jurisdiction over most appeals of lower court decisions. The Supreme Court could review either legal issues that a court of appeals certified or decisions of court of appeals by writ of certiorari. On January 1, 1912, the effective date of the Judicial Code of 1911, the old Circuit Courts were abolished, with their remaining trial court jurisdiction transferred to the U.S. District Courts.

== List of cases in volume 309 U.S. ==
Case name	Citation	Opinion of the Court	Vote	Concurring opinion or statement	Dissenting opinion or statement	Procedural jurisdiction	Result
Miller v. Hatfield	309 U.S. 1 (1940)	per curiam	8-0	none	none	certiorari to the United States Court of Appeals for the Sixth Circuit (6th Cir.)	reversed
McGoldrick, Comptroller of the City of New York v. Gulf Oil Corporation	309 U.S. 2 (1940)	per curiam	8-0	none	none	certiorari to the New York Supreme Court (N.Y. Sup. Ct.)	dismissed
Oklahoma Packing Company v. Oklahoma Gas and Electric Company	309 U.S. 4 (1939)	Frankfurter	8-0	Hughes (opinion; joined by McReynolds and Roberts)	none	certiorari to the United States Court of Appeals for the Tenth Circuit (10th Cir.)	reversed
Real Estate-Land Title and Trust Company v. United States	309 U.S. 13 (1940)	Douglas	6-0[a][b]	none	none	certiorari to the United States Court of Appeals for the Third Circuit (3d Cir.)	affirmed
Yearsley v. W.A. Ross Trust Company	309 U.S. 18 (1940)	Hughes	8-0	none	none	certiorari to the United States Court of Appeals for the Eighth Circuit (8th Cir.)	affirmed
Carpenter v. Wabash Railroad Company	309 U.S. 23 (1940)	Hughes	8-0	none	none	certiorari to the United States Court of Appeals for the Eighth Circuit (8th Cir.)	vacated
Bell Telephone Company of Pennsylvania v. Pennsylvania Public Utilities Commission	309 U.S. 30 (1940)	per curiam	8-0	none	none	appeal from the Superior Court of Pennsylvania (Pa. Super. Ct.)	dismissed
McGoldrick, Comptroller of the City of New York v. Berwind-White Coal Mining Company	309 U.S. 33 (1940)	Stone	5-3	none	Hughes (opinion; joined by McReynolds and Roberts)	certiorari to the New York Supreme Court (N.Y. Sup. Ct.)	reversed
McGoldrick, Comptroller of the City of New York v. Felt and Tarrant Manufacturing Company	309 U.S. 70 (1940)	Stone	5-3	none	Hughes, McReynolds, and Roberts (on the grounds of their dissent in McGoldrick, Comptroller of the City of New York v. Berwind-White Coal Mining Company)	certiorari to the New York Supreme Court (N.Y. Sup. Ct.)	reversed
Morgan v. Commissioner of Internal Revenue	309 U.S. 78 (1940)	Roberts	8-0	none	none	certiorari to the United States Court of Appeals for the Seventh Circuit (7th Cir.)	affirmed
Madden v. Kentucky	309 U.S. 83 (1940)	Reed	6-2	Hughes (short statement)	Roberts (short statement; joined by McReynolds)	appeal from the Kentucky Court of Appeals (Ky.)	affirmed
James Stewart and Company v. Sadrakula	309 U.S. 94 (1940)	Reed	8-0	none	none	appeal from the New York Supreme Court (N.Y. Sup. Ct.)	affirmed
Helvering, Commissioner of Internal Revenue v. Hallock	309 U.S. 106 (1940)	Frankfurter	6-2	Hughes (short statement)	Roberts (opinion; joined by McReynolds)	certiorari to the United States Court of Appeals for the Sixth Circuit (6th Cir.)	affirmed (one case); reversed (four cases)
Federal Communications Commission v. Pottsville Broadcasting Company	309 U.S. 134 (1940)	Frankfurter	8-0	McReynolds (without opinion)	none	certiorari to the United States Court of Appeals for the District of Columbia (D.C. Cir.)	reversed
Fly v. Heitmeyer	309 U.S. 146 (1940)	Frankfurter	8-0	McReynolds (without opinion)	none	certiorari to the United States Court of Appeals for the District of Columbia (D.C. Cir.)	reversed
Helvering, Commissioner of Internal Revenue v. Fitch	309 U.S. 149 (1940)	Douglas	7-1	Reed (without opinion)	McReynolds (without opinion)	certiorari to the United States Court of Appeals for the Eighth Circuit (8th Cir.)	reversed
Illinois Central Railroad Company v. Minnesota	309 U.S. 157 (1940)	Douglas	8-0	none	none	appeal from the Minnesota Supreme Court (Minn.)	affirmed
United States ex rel. Midland Loan Finance Company v. National Surety Corporation	309 U.S. 165 (1940)	Reed	8-0	none	none	certiorari to the United States Court of Appeals for the Eighth Circuit (8th Cir.)	affirmed
McCarroll v. Dixie Greyhound Lines, Inc.	309 U.S. 176 (1940)	McReynolds	8-0[c]	Stone (opinion; joined by Hughes, Roberts, and Reed)	none	appeal from the United States Court of Appeals for the Eighth Circuit (8th Cir.)	affirmed
Deitrick v. Greaney	309 U.S. 190 (1940)	Stone	6-2[c]	none	Roberts (opinion; joined by McReynolds)	certiorari to the United States Court of Appeals for the First Circuit (1st Cir.)	reversed
National Labor Relations Board v. Waterman Steamship Corporation	309 U.S. 206 (1940)	Black	8-0[c]	none	none	certiorari to the United States Court of Appeals for the First Circuit (1st Cir.)	reversed
Chambers v. Florida	309 U.S. 227 (1940)	Black	8-0[c]	none	none	certiorari to the Florida Supreme Court (Fla.)	reversed
Federal Housing Administration v. Burr	309 U.S. 242 (1940)	Douglas	8-0[c]	none	none	certiorari to the Michigan Supreme Court (Mich.)	affirmed
South Chicago Coal and Dock Company v. Bassett	309 U.S. 251 (1940)	Hughes	8-0[c]	none	none	certiorari to the United States Court of Appeals for the Seventh Circuit (7th Cir.)	affirmed
Amalgamated Utility Workers (C.I.O.) v. Consolidated Edison Company of New York	309 U.S. 261 (1940)	Hughes	8-0[c]	none	none	certiorari to the United States Court of Appeals for the Second Circuit (2d Cir.)	affirmed
Minnesota ex rel. Pearson v. Probate Court of Ramsey County	309 U.S. 270 (1940)	Hughes	9-0	none	none	appeal from the Minnesota Supreme Court (Minn.)	affirmed
Helvering, Commissioner of Internal Revenue v. Kehoe	309 U.S. 277 (1940)	McReynolds	9-0	none	none	certiorari to the United States Court of Appeals for the Third Circuit (3d Cir.)	reversed
Russel v. Todd	309 U.S. 280 (1940)	Stone	7-1[c]	none	Roberts (without opinion)	certiorari to the United States Court of Appeals for the Second Circuit (2d Cir.)	affirmed
Fischer v. Pauline Oil and Gas Company	309 U.S. 294 (1940)	Roberts	8-0[c]	none	none	certiorari to the Oklahoma Supreme Court (Okla.)	reversed
Germantown Trust Company v. Commissioner of Internal Revenue	309 U.S. 304 (1940)	Roberts	9-0	none	none	certiorari to the United States Court of Appeals for the Third Circuit (3d Cir.)	reversed
Mayo, Commissioner of Agriculture of Florida v. Lakeland Highlands Canning Company	309 U.S. 310 (1940)	Roberts	5-3[c]	none	Frankfurter (opinion; joined by Black and Douglas)	appeal from the United States District Court for the Southern District of Florida (S.D. Fla.)	reversed
Cobbledick v. United States	309 U.S. 323 (1940)	Frankfurter	8-0[c]	none	none	certiorari to the United States Court of Appeals for the Ninth Circuit (9th Cir.)	affirmed
Helvering, Commissioner of Internal Revenue v. Clifford	309 U.S. 331 (1940)	Douglas	7-2	none	Roberts (opinion; joined by McReynolds)	certiorari to the United States Court of Appeals for the Eighth Circuit (8th Cir.)	reversed
Helvering, Commissioner of Internal Revenue v. Wood	309 U.S. 344 (1940)	Douglas	9-0	Roberts (without opinion)	none	certiorari to the United States Court of Appeals for the Second Circuit (2d Cir.)	affirmed
National Licorice Company v. National Labor Relations Board	309 U.S. 350 (1940)	Stone	8-0[c]	Douglas (short statement; joined by Black)	none	certiorari to the United States Court of Appeals for the Second Circuit (2d Cir.)	affirmed as modified
Paramino Lumber Company v. Marshall	309 U.S. 370 (1940)	Reed	7-1[c]	none	McReynolds (without opinion)	appeal from the United States District Court for the Western District of Washington (W.D. Wash.)	affirmed
Dickinson Industrial Site, Inc. v. Cowan	309 U.S. 382 (1940)	Douglas	9-0	none	none	certiorari to the United States Court of Appeals for the Seventh Circuit (7th Cir.)	affirmed
Sheldon v. Metro-Goldwyn Pictures Corporation	309 U.S. 390 (1940)	Hughes	8-0[d]	none	none	certiorari to the United States Court of Appeals for the Second Circuit (2d Cir.)	affirmed
Helvering, Commissioner of Internal Revenue v. Price	309 U.S. 409 (1940)	Hughes	8-0[d]	none	none	certiorari to the United States Court of Appeals for the Fourth Circuit (4th Cir.)	reversed
McGoldrick, Comptroller of the City of New York v. Gulf Oil Corporation	309 U.S. 414 (1940)	Stone	8-0[d]	none	none	certiorari to the New York Supreme Court (N.Y. Sup. Ct.)	affirmed
McGoldrick, Comptroller of the City of New York v. Compagnie Generale Transatlantique	309 U.S. 430 (1940)	Stone	7-0[c][d]	Hughes and Roberts (joint short statement)	none	certiorari to the New York Supreme Court (N.Y. Sup. Ct.)	reversed
Ethyl Gasoline Corp. v. United States	309 U.S. 436 (1940)	Stone	7-0[a][d]	none	none	appeal from the United States District Court for the Southern District of New York (S.D.N.Y.)	affirmed
Helvering, Commissioner of Internal Revenue v. Bruun	309 U.S. 461 (1940)	Roberts	8-0[d]	Hughes	none	certiorari to the United States Court of Appeals for the Eighth Circuit (8th Cir.)	reversed
Federal Communications Commission v. Sanders Brothers Radio Station	309 U.S. 470 (1940)	Roberts	8-0[d]	none	none	certiorari to the United States Court of Appeals for the District of Columbia (D.C. Cir.)	reversed
Thompson v. Magnolia Petroleum Company	309 U.S. 478 (1940)	Black	8-0[d]	none	none	certiorari to the United States Court of Appeals for the Eighth Circuit (8th Cir.)	reversed
Kersh Lake Drainage District v. Johnson	309 U.S. 485 (1940)	Black	8-0[d]	none	none	certiorari to the Arkansas Supreme Court (Ark.)	affirmed
United States v. Shaw	309 U.S. 495 (1940)	Reed	8-0[d]	none	none	certiorari to the Michigan Supreme Court (Mich.)	reversed
United States v. United States Fidelity and Guaranty Company	309 U.S. 506 (1940)	Reed	8-0[d]	none	none	certiorari to the United States Court of Appeals for the Tenth Circuit (10th Cir.)	reversed
Inland Waterways Corporation v. Young	309 U.S. 517 (1940)	Frankfurter	4-3[b][c]	none	Roberts (opinion; joined by Hughes and McReynolds)	certiorari to the United States Court of Appeals for the District of Columbia (D.C. Cir.)	reversed
Woodring, Secretary of War v. Wardell	309 U.S. 527 (1940)	Frankfurter	4-3[b][c]	none	Hughes, McReynolds, and Roberts (for the reasons stated in their dissent in Inland Waterways Corporation v. Young)	certiorari to the United States Court of Appeals for the District of Columbia (D.C. Cir.)	affirmed reversed
Whitney v. State Tax Commission of New York	309 U.S. 530 (1940)	Frankfurter	7-1[d]	none	Roberts (short statement)	appeal from the New York Surrogate's Court (N.Y. Sur. Ct.)	affirmed
Puerto Rico v. Rubert Hermanos, Inc.	309 U.S. 543 (1940)	Frankfurter	8-0[d]	none	none	certiorari to the United States Court of Appeals for the First Circuit (1st Cir.)	reversed
Minnesota v. National Tea Company	309 U.S. 551 (1940)	Douglas	5-3[d]	none	Hughes (opinion; joined by Stone and Roberts)	certiorari to the Minnesota Supreme Court (Minn.)	vacated
Tradesmens National Bank v. Oklahoma Tax Commission	309 U.S. 560 (1940)	Murphy	9-0	none	none	appeal from the Oklahoma Supreme Court (Okla.)	affirmed
Wisconsin v. Illinois	309 U.S. 569 (1940)	per curiam	9-0	none	none	original jurisdiction	special master appointed
Wyoming v. Colorado	309 U.S. 572 (1940)	Hughes	9-0	none	none	original jurisdiction	petition of Wyoming denied
Western Union Telegraph Company v. Nester	309 U.S. 582 (1940)	McReynolds	9-0	none	none	certiorari to the United States Court of Appeals for the Ninth Circuit (9th Cir.)	reversed
City of Yonkers v. Downey	309 U.S. 590 (1940)	McReynolds	9-0	none	none	certiorari to the United States Court of Appeals for the Second Circuit (2d Cir.)	affirmed
Maurer v. Hamilton, Secretary of Revenue of Pennsylvania	309 U.S. 598 (1940)	Stone	9-0	none	none	appeal from the Pennsylvania Supreme Court (Pa.)	affirmed

[a] Roberts took no part in the case
[b] Reed took no part in the case
[c] Murphy took no part in the case
[d] McReynolds took no part in the case
