= French Atlantic Cable Company =

Western European telecommunications business

The French Atlantic Cable Company (Société du Cable Transatlantique Francaise Limited) was established in 1869 to install a transatlantic telegraph cable independent of British territories. The cable ran 2,584 miles from Brest to Saint Pierre Island off the coast of Newfoundland, then a second leg ran 749 miles to land at Duxbury, Massachusetts, near Boston. The company also installed a second cable from Salcombe, on the south west coast of England, to the coast of Brittany, thereby bypassing traffic around British-owned cables across the English Channel.

Entry into this market created a fall in trans-Atlantic telegram prices initially; the Atlantic Telegraph Company negotiated an operating agreement with the French company, effectively fixing prices until additional competitors entered the business. In the event of a breakdown in either company's cable, the other company agreed to temporarily carry traffic until repairs were made.

A second French cable company, Compagnie française du télégraphe de Paris à New-York, was established in 1879 and operated until 1895.
