= Communications Opportunity, Promotion and Enhancement Bill of 2006 =

The Communications Opportunity, Promotion and Enhancement (COPE) Act of 2006 (H.R. 5252) was a bill in the U.S. House of Representatives. It was part of a major overhaul of the Telecommunications Act of 1996 being considered by the US Congress. The Act was sponsored by Commerce Committee Chairman Joe Barton (R-TX), Rep. Fred Upton (R-MI), Rep. Charles Pickering (R-MS) and Rep. Bobby Rush (D-IL).

== Overview ==
The last version of the Act (HR 5252) included network neutrality provisions defined by the FCC. An amendment offered by Rep. Ed Markey (D-MA) would have supplemented these with a prohibition against service tiering, which would have prevented Internet service providers charging consumers more money in exchange for not reducing their Internet speed. The COPE Act was passed by the full House on June 8, 2006; the Markey Amendment failed, leaving the final bill without meaningful network neutrality provisions.

The US Senate was also involved in the issue. Senator Ron Wyden (D-OR) introduced the Internet Nondiscrimination Act of 2006, and Senators Olympia Snowe (R-ME) and Byron Dorgan (D-ND) were expected to introduce a bipartisan amendment supporting net neutrality when the Senate took up its own rewrite (the "Communications, Consumer's Choice, and Broadband Deployment Act of 2006", a.k.a. S. 2686) of the Telecommunications Act of 1996 later that year.

The bill would have created a single set of national video franchising rules that permit competitors to enter the market without obtaining thousands of individual city-by-city agreements.

The legislation would have protected fees paid to local authorities, preserved public, educational and government programming, and provided federal consumer protection and customer service standards.

The bill was lobbied for by AT&T and received support from Verizon Communications whilst organizations such as Save the Internet and Common Cause have opposed it.

== See also ==
- Communications Act of 1934
- Telecommunications Act of 1996
