= Broadband open access =

Policy debate in telecommunications

Broadband open access is an issue of policy debate in telecommunications, regarding whether or not companies which own broadband telecommunication infrastructure (such as cable operators) should be required to provide access to their facilities for competing businesses which do not own physical infrastructure. The issue came to the fore in the U.S. in 1998, when AT&T Corporation announced its plan to acquire TCI, then the nation's largest cable operator. It involved municipal and local governments, the courts, Federal Communications Commission (the FCC), Congress, businesses, industry associations, consumer advocacy groups, and others. Similar issues arose in other countries such as the Netherlands, Hungary, and Canada.

In the United States, cable operators were not required to provide access to their facilities to other competing businesses. However, local telephone providers with physical infrastructure, or incumbent local exchange carriers, had such an obligation. This asymmetrical scheme of regulation became a problem when the two industries' businesses came to overlap and the boundary between them eroded. This transformation of industrial landscape, often called convergence, happened in the broadband Internet service provider market. To make matters worse, the cable operators were the leading camp although local telephone carriers were burdened by the open-access obligation.

Broadband high-speed internet has become a worldwide breakthrough for telecommunication services. The service has become crucial for businesses to be able to communicate with customers and is on the verge of being a standard public utility, rather than a luxury for residents. Although other services are still offered, like dial-up Internet access or satellite internet access, broadband internet is the most convenient and fastest mode of telecommunications. With broadband open access, the popularity of this service is in great demand. The debate of making incumbent cable operators obligated to allow competitors to wire into their infrastructure is comparable to the Bell Operating Company (BOC) issue that split into the Regional Bell Operating Companies. Leading cable operators can easily avoid competition due to reasons such as lack of funding for those competitors to build their own backbone network, or even the lack of space available.

For the past couple of years now, President Barack Obama has set out to try to resolve these issues. On February 10, 2011, he announced plans to expand wireless Internet access. This plan intends to provide high-speed wireless services to 98 percent of Americans or more. The idea behind this is to increase education among Americans, build businesses and profit, and support state-of-the-art technology for state officials. In terms of broadband open access, the plan will be deployed by leading carriers of high-speed Internet. However, the debate may still remain of how this helps the incoming service provider or smaller companies that already exist. Will small companies earn profit if the country is provided Internet through the leading companies?

Broadband open access has also brought on questions of how services to competition is offered, such as unbundled access services sold to the new company. This includes services that can be hard to duplicate. The concept is like what service providers offer their own customers and having television, voice, and Internet service bundled into one package. Any competitor may rent office space in an incumbent's central office, place equipment to interconnect with their network, or purchase other related services. The company can offer the same deal to a competing company requesting use of their network and facilities. The new entrant has a right to purchase access to the incumbent on an unbundled basis. Getting unbundled services means the new entrant has the opportunity to invest in its own network and therefore spend less on buying everything wholesale. They are able to make a profit using their own equipment and do not have to spend it all on the incumbent hardware and software provided.

== See also ==
Such an initiative exists in Lund (Sweden) through a system called BRIKKS edited by the company Labs²
