= List of United States Supreme Court cases, volume 392 =

This is a list of all the United States Supreme Court cases from volume 392 of the United States Reports:

Case name	Citation	Date decided
Terry v. Ohio	392 U.S. 1	1968
Sibron v. New York	392 U.S. 40	1968
Flast v. Cohen	392 U.S. 83	1968
Perma Life Mufflers, Inc. v. International Parts Corp.	392 U.S. 134	1968
United States v. Sw. Cable Co.	392 U.S. 157	1968
Maryland v. Wirtz	392 U.S. 183	1968
Cheng Fan Kwok v. INS	392 U.S. 206	1968
Harrison v. United States	392 U.S. 219	1968
Board of Ed. v. Allen	392 U.S. 236	1968
Gardner v. Broderick	392 U.S. 273	1968
Uniformed Sanitation Men Assn., Inc. v. Comm'r of Sanitation	392 U.S. 280	1968
George Campbell Painting Corp. v. Reid	392 U.S. 286	1968
Roberts v. Russell	392 U.S. 293	1968
Johnson Products, Inc. v. City Council	392 U.S. 296	1968
Perla v. New York	392 U.S. 296	1968
Bujese v. United States	392 U.S. 297	1968
Fields v. Department of Social Welfare	392 U.S. 297	1968
Schneble v. Florida	392 U.S. 298	1968
Bogart v. California	392 U.S. 298	1968
Jones v. United States (1968)	392 U.S. 299	1968
Pickens v. Oliver	392 U.S. 300	1968
Santoro v. United States	392 U.S. 301	1968
Jones v. Louisiana	392 U.S. 302	1968
Nelson v. United States	392 U.S. 303	1968
Hunt v. Connecticut	392 U.S. 304	1968
Serio v. United States	392 U.S. 305	1968
Williams v. Florida	392 U.S. 306	1968
Hillman v. Florida	392 U.S. 307	1968
McCarty v. Kansas	392 U.S. 308	1968
King v. Smith	392 U.S. 309	1968
First Agric. Nat'l Bank v. State Tax Comm'n	392 U.S. 339	1968
Mancusi v. DeForte	392 U.S. 364	1968
Lee v. Florida	392 U.S. 378	1968
Fortnightly Corp. v. United Artists Television, Inc.	392 U.S. 390	1968
Jones v. Alfred H. Mayer Co.	392 U.S. 409	1968
Hanover Shoe, Inc. v. United Shoe Machinery Corp.	392 U.S. 481	1968
Powell v. Texas	392 U.S. 514	1968
Am. Com. Lines, Inc. v. Louisville & Nashville R. Co.	392 U.S. 571	1968
Wainwright v. City of New Orleans	392 U.S. 598	1968
Miller v. California	392 U.S. 616	1968
DeStefano v. Woods	392 U.S. 631	1968
Lee Art Theatre, Inc. v. Virginia	392 U.S. 636	1968
Houghton v. Shafer	392 U.S. 639	1968
Chan Kwan Chung v. INS	392 U.S. 642	1968
City of Williamsport v. United States	392 U.S. 642	1968
Goldman v. New York	392 U.S. 643	1968
Rhodes v. Cook	392 U.S. 643	1968
Harper v. Michigan	392 U.S. 644	1968
Carrillo v. Craven	392 U.S. 644	1968
Vialpando v. Patterson	392 U.S. 645	1968
Caton v. Alabama	392 U.S. 645	1968
Cook v. United States	392 U.S. 646	1968
Heard v. Rizzo	392 U.S. 646	1968
Singer v. Myers	392 U.S. 647	1968
Lopinson v. Pennsylvania	392 U.S. 647	1968
Spence v. North Carolina	392 U.S. 649	1968
Streeter v. Craven	392 U.S. 650	1968
Pope v. United States	392 U.S. 651	1968
Wheat v. Washington	392 U.S. 652	1968
Puentes v. Board of Ed.	392 U.S. 653	1968
Holland v. Hogan	392 U.S. 654	1968
Henry v. Louisiana	392 U.S. 655	1968
Maxwell v. Good Samaritan Hospital Assn., Inc.	392 U.S. 656	1968
Sullivan v. Little Hunting Park, Inc.	392 U.S. 657	1968
Hopper v. Louisiana	392 U.S. 658	1968
Clark Walter & Sons, Inc. v. United States	392 U.S. 659	1968
Copas v. Schmidt	392 U.S. 660	1968
Wade v. Yeager	392 U.S. 661	1968
Toles v. Clark	392 U.S. 662	1968
West v. California	392 U.S. 663	1968
Carroll v. Texas	392 U.S. 664	1968
McDaniel v. North Carolina	392 U.S. 665	1968
Robinson v. Tennessee	392 U.S. 666	1968
Taggart v. New York	392 U.S. 667	1968
