= Title 47 of the United States Code =

U.S. federal statutes on telecommunications

Title 47 of the United States Code defines the role and structure of the Federal Communications Commission, an independent agency of the United States government, and the National Telecommunications and Information Administration, part of the United States Department of Commerce. It also criminalizes damage by ships to underwater cables and defines how candidates for political office receive special access to broadcast stations. The Communications Act of 1934, the Communications Assistance for Law Enforcement Act, and the Launching Our Communities' Access to Local (LOCAL) Television Act of 2000 are codified in this title.

- Chapter 1: Telegraphs
- Chapter 2: Submarine Cables
- Chapter 3: Radiotelegraphs
- Chapter 4: Radio Act of 1927
- Chapter 5: Wire or Radio Communication
- Chapter 6: Communications Satellite System
- Chapter 7: Campaign Communications
- Chapter 8: National Telecommunications and Information Administration
- Chapter 9: Interception of Digital and Other Communications
- Chapter 10: Local TV
- Chapter 11: Commercial Mobile Service Alerts
- Chapter 12: Broadband
- Chapter 13: Public Safety Communications and Electromagnetic Spectrum Auctions
- Chapter 14: Making Opportunities for Broadband Investment and Limiting Excessive And Needless Obstacles to Wireless
- Chapter 15: Secure and Trusted Communications Networks
- Chapter 16: Broadband Access

== Foreign adversaries ==
A foreign adversary is defined in Title 47 as "any foreign government or foreign nongovernment person engaged in a long-term pattern or serious instances of conduct significantly adverse to the national security of the United States or security and safety of United States persons." Parties may be designated as a foreign adversary by the Secretary of Commerce.
