= Compagnie française du télégraphe de Paris à New-York =

French telecommunications company

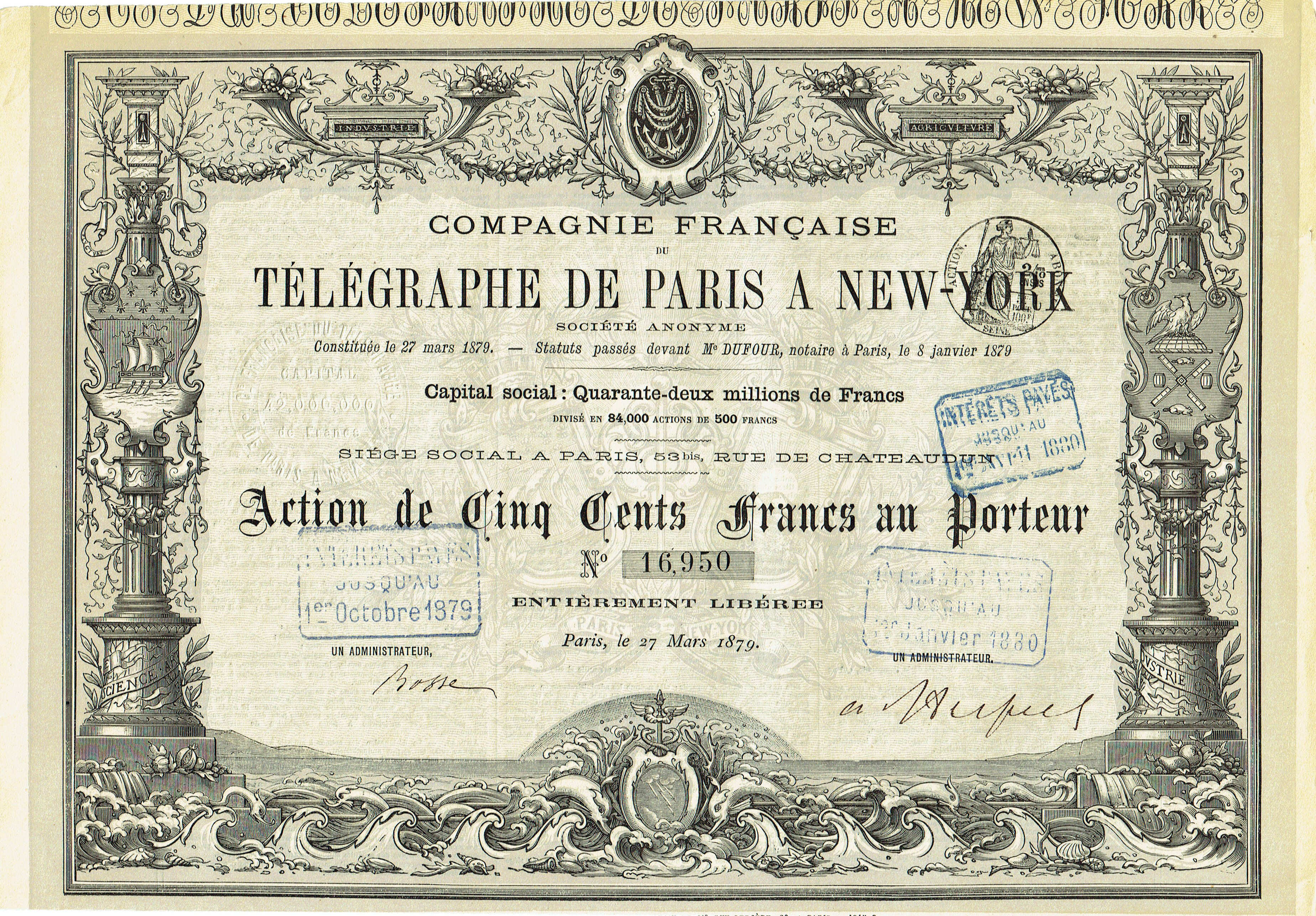
Share of the Compagnie Francaise du Télégraphe de Paris à New York, issued 27. March 1879

Compagnie française du télégraphe de Paris à New-York (French Telegraph Company from Paris to New York) was a telegraph company founded in 1879 by Augustin Pouyer-Quertier, at the request of the French government. The previous company, the French Atlantic Cable Company, had laid a cable in 1869, but had effectively merged with the Anglo-American Telegraph Company in 1873.

The French government, wishing a communication line entirely under the control of French entities, commissioned the founding of this company. The company operated until 1895 when due to bankruptcy it became part of Société française des télégraphes sous-marins operating submarine cable systems worldwide.

== See also ==
- Transatlantic telegraph cable
